= Tetraiodide =

tetraiodide may refer to:

- Carbon tetraiodide, CI_{4}
- Diphosphorus tetraiodide, P_{2}I_{4}, an orange crystalline solid and a versatile reducing agent
- Germanium tetraiodide, GeI_{4}
- Iridium tetraiodide, IrI_{4}
- Niobium tetraiodide, NbI_{4}
- Platinum tetraiodide, PtI_{4}
- Polonium tetraiodide, PoI_{4}
- Protactinium tetraiodide, PaI_{4}
- Rhenium tetraiodide, ReI_{4}
- Silicon tetraiodide, SiI_{4}
- Tantalum tetraiodide, TaI_{4}
- Tellurium tetraiodide, TeI_{4}
- Thorium tetraiodide, ThI_{4}
- Tin tetraiodide, SnI_{4}
- Titanium tetraiodide, TiI_{4}
- Tungsten tetraiodide, WI_{4}
- Uranium tetraiodide, UI_{4}
