= Niobium fluoride =

Two fluorides of niobium are well characterized:

- Niobium(IV) fluoride
- Niobium(V) fluoride
