= Tantalum(V) bromide =

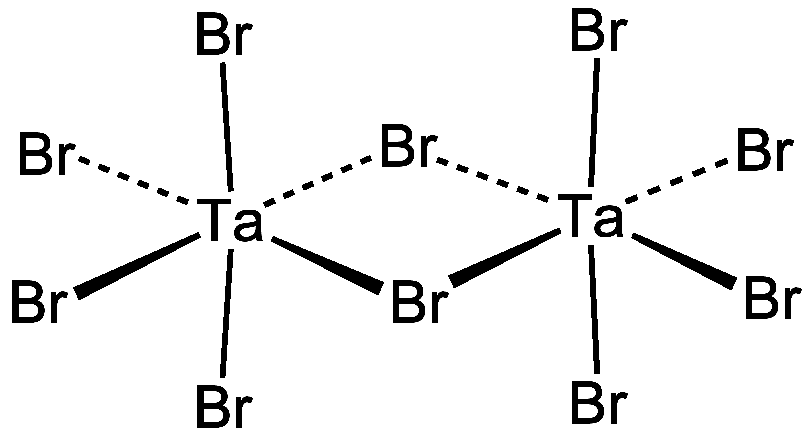
- Tantalum(V) bromide

Names
- Other names tantalum pentabromide

Identifiers
CAS Number	13451-11-1 TaBr_{5}; 17786-61-7 Ta_{2}Br_{10}
3D model (JSmol)	monomer: Interactive image; dimer: Interactive image
ChemSpider	75318
ECHA InfoCard	100.033.276
EC Number	236-618-4
PubChem CID	83480
UNII	VX8APQ3732
CompTox Dashboard (EPA)	DTXSID1065471
- InChI: Key: GCPVYIPZZUPXPB-UHFFFAOYSA-I; InChI=1S/5BrH.Ta/h5*1H;/q;;;;;+5/p-5
- SMILES: monomer: Br[Ta](Br)(Br)(Br)Br; dimer: Br[Ta-]1(Br)(Br)(Br)[Br+][Ta-]([Br+]1)(Br)(Br)(Br)Br

Properties
Chemical formula	Ta_{2}Br_{10}
Molar mass	580.468 g/mol
Appearance	yellow solid
Density	4.99 g/cm^{3}, solid
Melting point	265 °C (509 °F; 538 K)
Boiling point	349 °C (660 °F; 622 K)
Solubility in water	hydrolysis

Hazards
- GHS labelling
Pictograms	(GHS05: Corrosive) (GHS06: Toxic) (GHS07: Exclamation mark)
Signal word	Danger
Hazard statements	H302, H312, H314, H332
Precautionary statements	P260, P264, P270, P271, P280, P301+P312, P301+P330+P331, P302+P352, P303+P361+P353, P304+P312, P304+P340, P305+P351+P338, P310, P311, P312, P321, P322, P330, P361, P363, P403+P233, P405, P501

Related compounds
Other anions	Tantalum(V) fluoride; Tantalum(V) chloride; Tantalum(V) iodide
Other cations	Protactinium(V) bromide; Niobium(V) bromide
- Except where otherwise noted, data are given for materials in their standard state (at 25 °C [77 °F], 100 kPa). verify (what is ?) Infobox references

Tantalum(V) bromide is the inorganic compound with the formula Ta_{2}Br_{10}. Its name comes from the compound's empirical formula, TaBr_{5}. It is a diamagnetic, yellow solid that hydrolyses readily. The compound adopts an edge-shared bioctahedral structure, which means that two TaBr_{5} units are joined by a pair of bromide bridges. There is no bond between the Ta centres. Niobium(V) chloride, niobium(V) bromide, niobium(V) iodide, tantalum(V) chloride, and tantalum(V) iodide all share this structural motif.

== Preparation and handling ==
The material is usually prepared by the reaction of bromine with tantalum metal (or tantalum carbide) at elevated temperatures in a tube furnace. The bromides of the early metals are sometimes preferred to the chlorides because of the relative ease of handling liquid bromine vs gaseous chlorine. Like other molecular halides, it is soluble in nonpolar solvents such as carbon tetrachloride (1.465 g/100 mL at 30 °C), but it reacts with some solvents. It can also be produced from the more accessible oxide by metathesis using aluminium tribromide:

3 Ta_{2}O_{5} + 10 AlBr_{3} → 6 TaBr_{5} + 5 Al_{2}O_{3}

Carbothermal reduction of the oxide in the presence of bromine has also been employed, the byproduct being COBr_{2}.
