= Niobium(IV) chloride =

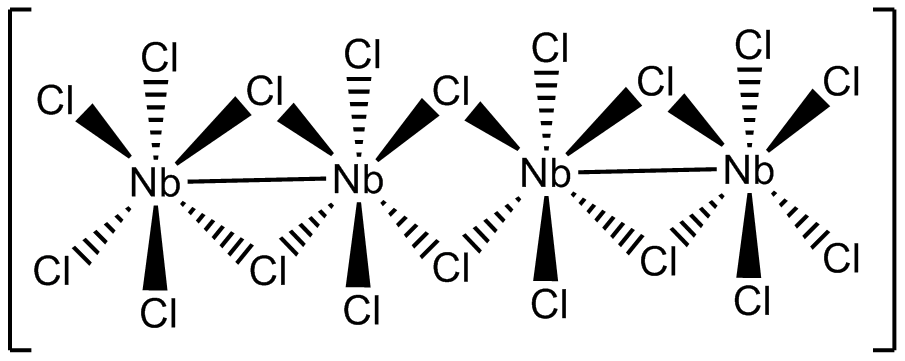

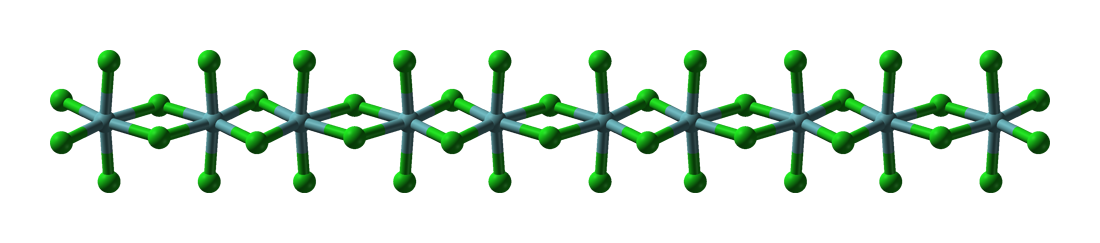

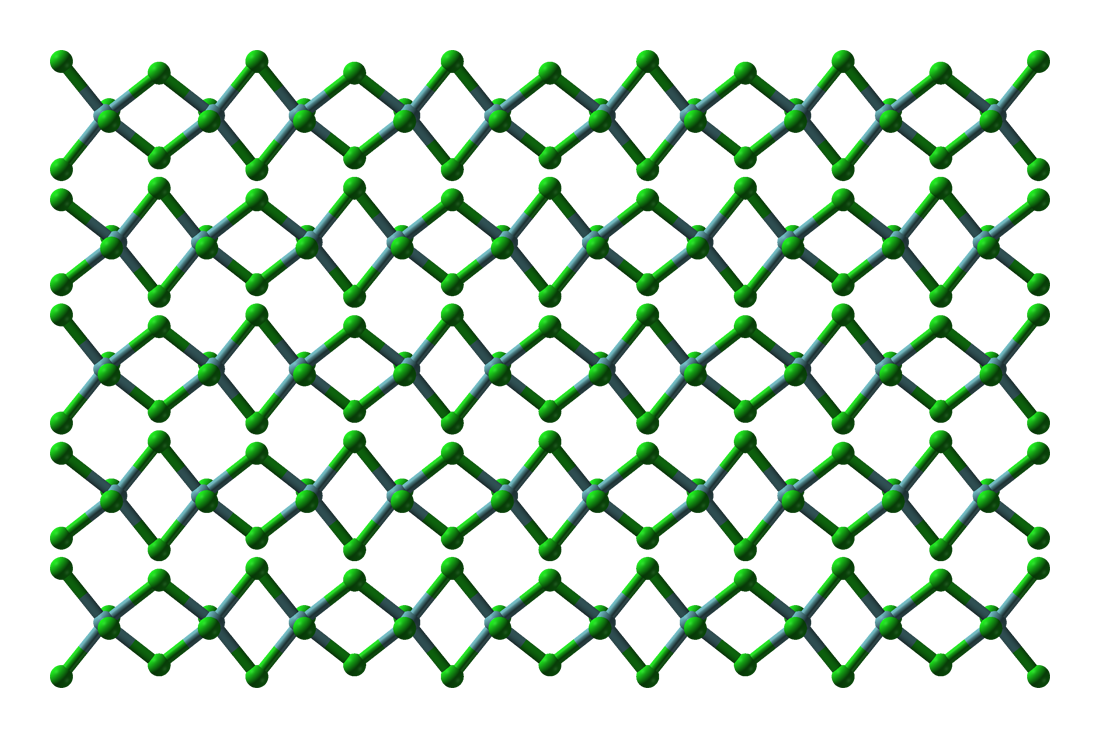

Names
- IUPAC name Niobium(IV) chloride
- Other names Niobium tetrachloride Niobium chloride

Identifiers
CAS Number	13569-70-5
3D model (JSmol)	Interactive image
ChemSpider	75413
PubChem CID	83583
CompTox Dashboard (EPA)	DTXSID8065539
- InChI: InChI=1S/4ClH.Nb/h4*1H;/q;;;;+4/p-4 Key: FCLAPXQWWIRXCV-UHFFFAOYSA-J
- SMILES: Cl[Nb](Cl)(Cl)Cl

Properties
Chemical formula	NbCl_{4}
Molar mass	234.718 g/mol
Appearance	Violet-Black Crystals
Density	3.2 g/cm^{3}
Melting point	Dec. 800 °C
Boiling point	Subl. 275 °C/10^{−4} mmHg
Solubility in water	Reacts

Related compounds
Other anions	Niobium(IV) bromide Niobium(IV) iodide
Other cations	Vanadium(IV) chloride Tantalum(IV) chloride
Related niobium chlorides	Niobium(III) chloride Niobium(V) chloride
- Except where otherwise noted, data are given for materials in their standard state (at 25 °C [77 °F], 100 kPa). verify (what is ?) Infobox references

Niobium(IV) chloride, also known as niobium tetrachloride, is the chemical compound of formula NbCl_{4}. This compound exists as dark violet crystals, is highly sensitive to air and moisture, and disproportiates into niobium(III) chloride and niobium(V) chloride when heated.

== Structure and properties ==
In the solid state, niobium(IV) chloride exists as chains of edge-sharing octahedra with alternating Nb-Nb distances of lengths 302.9 and 379.4 pm. The shorter distances correspond to Nb-Nb bonds, which result in the compound's diamagnetism. Its structure is very similar to that of tungsten(IV) chloride.

Other coordination complexes with the formula NbCl_{4}L_{2}, such as tetrachlorobis(tetrahydrofuran) niobium, only form monomers resulting in one unpaired electron in the d_{xy} orbital, making the compounds paramagnetic.

Niobium chloride rapidly oxidizes and hydrolyzes in air to form niobium(V) oxide.

== Preparation ==
Niobium(IV) chloride is typically produced by allowing elemental niobium and niobium(V) chloride crystals to react over several days in a temperature gradient, with the metal around 400 °C and the salt around 250 °C.

4 NbCl_{5} + Nb → 5 NbCl_{4}

Niobium (IV) chloride can also prepared by a similar reduction of niobium pentachloride with powdered aluminium.

3 NbCl_{5} + Al → 3 NbCl_{4} + AlCl_{3}

A similar technique is also used in the synthesis of niobium(IV) bromide and tantalum(IV) chloride. Niobium(IV) iodide exists as well and may be synthesized by thermal decomposition of niobium(V) iodide.

At 400 °C NbCl_{4} disproportiates:

2 NbCl_{4} → NbCl_{3} + NbCl_{5}

== Reactions ==
The disproportiation of niobium(IV) chloride can be used to make tetrachlorobis(tetrahydrofuran) niobium, a useful synthon in Nb^{IV} chemistry due to the lability of the attached tetrahydrofuran ligands. This compound can be synthesized by first reacting NbCl_{5} with aluminium in acetonitrile followed by addition of tetrahydrofuran to the resultant solid by the following reaction.

3 NbCl_{5} + Al + 3 CH_{3}CN → 3 NbCl_{4}(NCCH_{3})_{3} + AlCl_{3}
3 NbCl_{4}(NCCH_{3})_{3} + AlCl_{3} + 3 C_{4}H_{8}O → 3 NbCl_{4}(thf)_{2} + 9 MeCN + AlCl_{3}(thf)
