= Pentaiodide =

A pentaiodide is a compound or ion that contains five iodine atoms or ions. Some examples include:

- pentaiodide - the anion I^{−}_{5}
- Niobium pentaiodide - NbI_{5}, which exists as a dimer
- Tantalum pentaiodide - TaI_{5}, which exists as a dimer
- Protactinium pentaiodide - PaI_{5}

== See also ==
- Polyiodide
