= Pentabromide =

Pentabromide may refer to:

- Niobium pentabromide, NbBr_{5}
- Protactinium pentabromide, PaBr_{5}
- Tantalum pentabromide, TaBr_{5}
- Tungsten pentabromide, WBr_{5}
- Uranium pentabromide, UBr_{5}
