= Niobium(V) bromide =

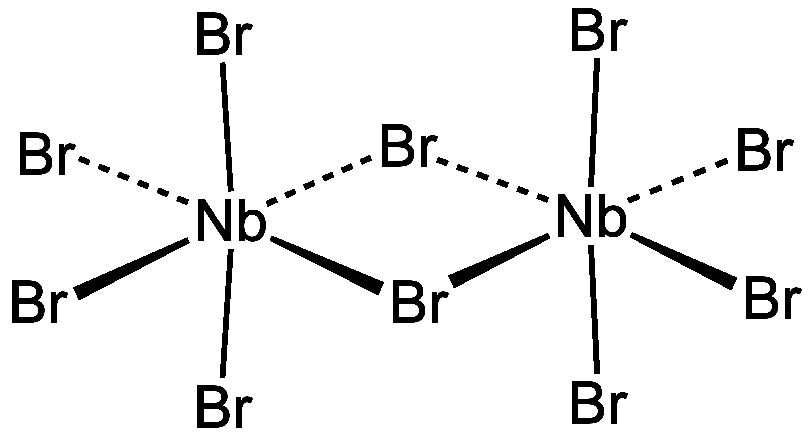

Names
- Other names niobium pentabromide

Identifiers
CAS Number	13478-45-0 NbBr_{5}; 17633-68-0 Nb_{2}Br_{10}
3D model (JSmol)	ionic representation: Interactive image; monomer: Interactive image; dimer: Interactive image
ChemSpider	19388901
ECHA InfoCard	100.033.420
EC Number	236-778-5
PubChem CID	83517
CompTox Dashboard (EPA)	DTXSID6065505
- InChI: InChI=1S/5BrH.Nb/h5*1H;/q;;;;;+5/p-5 Key: DSYRJFDOOSKABR-UHFFFAOYSA-I; InChI=1/5BrH.Nb/h5*1H;/q;;;;;+5/p-5 Key: DSYRJFDOOSKABR-AACRGIKGAJ
- SMILES: ionic representation: [Br-].[Br-].[Br-].[Br-].[Br-].[Nb+5]; monomer: Br[Nb](Br)(Br)(Br)Br; dimer: Br[Nb-]1(Br)(Br)(Br)[Br+][Nb-]([Br+]1)(Br)(Br)(Br)Br

Properties
Chemical formula	NbBr_{5}
Molar mass	492.430 g/mol
Appearance	wine red to black crystals
Density	4.417 g/cm^{3}
Melting point	254 °C (489 °F; 527 K)
Boiling point	364 °C (687 °F; 637 K)
Solubility in water	hydrolyzes

Structure
Crystal structure	orthorhombic

Hazards
- GHS labelling
Pictograms	(GHS05: Corrosive) (GHS07: Exclamation mark)
Signal word	Danger
Hazard statements	H302, H312, H314, H332
Precautionary statements	P260, P264, P270, P271, P280, P301+P312, P301+P330+P331, P302+P352, P303+P361+P353, P304+P312, P304+P340, P305+P351+P338, P310, P312, P321, P322, P330, P363, P405, P501
Safety data sheet (SDS)	MSDS
- Except where otherwise noted, data are given for materials in their standard state (at 25 °C [77 °F], 100 kPa). verify (what is ?) Infobox references

Niobium(V) bromide is the inorganic compound with the formula Nb_{2}Br_{10}. Its name comes from the compound's empirical formula, NbBr_{5}. It is a diamagnetic, orange solid that hydrolyses readily. The compound adopts an edge-shared bioctahedral structure, which means that two NbBr_{5} units are joined by a pair of bromide bridges. There is no bond between the Nb centres. Niobium(V) chloride, niobium(V) iodide, tantalum(V) chloride, tantalum(V) bromide, and tantalum(V) iodide all share this structural motif.

== Synthesis ==
Niobium(V) bromide can be prepared by the reaction of bromine with niobium metal at 230–250 °C in a tube furnace. It can also be produced from the more accessible oxide by metathesis using aluminium tribromide:

3 Nb_{2}O_{5} + 10 AlBr_{3} → 6 NbBr_{5} + 5 Al_{2}O_{3}

A challenge with the latter method is the occurrence of NbOBr_{3} as an impurity.
