= Tantalum(V) fluoride =

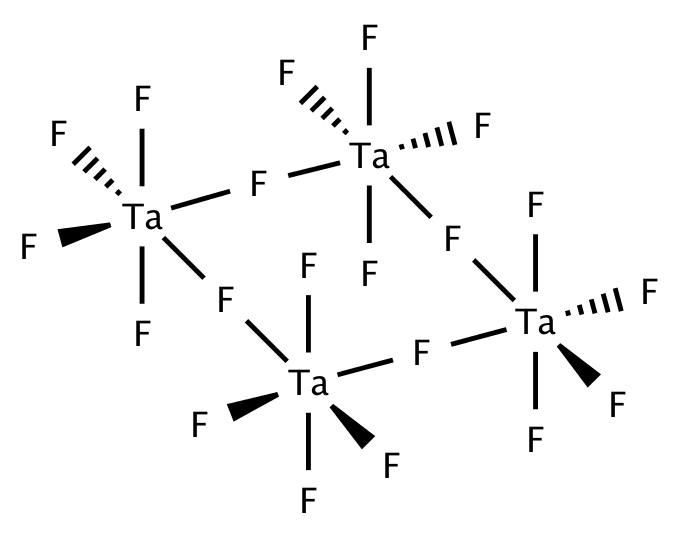
- Tantalum(V) fluoride

Names
- Other names tantalum pentafluoride

Identifiers
CAS Number	7783-71-3
3D model (JSmol)	monomer: Interactive image; tetramer: Interactive image
ChemSpider	74198
ECHA InfoCard	100.029.111
EC Number	232-022-3
PubChem CID	82218
RTECS number	WW5775000
UNII	QAG1W735WO
CompTox Dashboard (EPA)	DTXSID5064833
- InChI: Key: YRGLXIVYESZPLQ-UHFFFAOYSA-I; InChI=1S/5FH.Ta/h5*1H;/q;;;;;+5/p-5
- SMILES: monomer: F[Ta](F)(F)(F)F; tetramer: F[Ta-]0(F)(F)(F)[F+][Ta-](F)(F)(F)(F)[F+][Ta-](F)(F)(F)(F)[F+][Ta-](F)(F)(F)([F+]0)F

Properties
Chemical formula	TaF_{5}
Molar mass	275.93990 g·mol^{−1}
Appearance	white powder
Density	4.74 g/cm^{3}, solid
Melting point	96.8 °C (206.2 °F; 369.9 K)
Boiling point	229.5 °C (445.1 °F; 502.6 K)
Solubility in water	decomposes
Magnetic susceptibility (χ)	+795.0·10^{−6} cm^{3}/mol

Structure
Dipole moment	0 D

Hazards
- Occupational safety and health (OHS/OSH)
Main hazards	HF source
- GHS labelling
Pictograms	(GHS05: Corrosive) (GHS07: Exclamation mark)
Signal word	Danger
Hazard statements	H302, H314
Precautionary statements	P260, P264, P270, P271, P280, P301+P312, P301+P330+P331, P302+P352, P303+P361+P353, P304+P312, P304+P340, P305+P351+P338, P310, P312, P321, P322, P330, P363, P405, P501
Flash point	Non-flammable

Related compounds
Other anions	Tantalum(V) chloride; Tantalum(V) bromide; Tantalum(V) iodide
Other cations	Vanadium pentafluoride; Niobium(V) fluoride; Protactinium(V) fluoride
Related compounds	Tungsten hexafluoride
- Except where otherwise noted, data are given for materials in their standard state (at 25 °C [77 °F], 100 kPa). verify (what is ?) Infobox references

Tantalum(V) fluoride is the inorganic compound with the formula TaF_{5}. It is one of the principal molecular compounds of tantalum. Characteristic of some other pentafluorides, the compound is volatile but exists as a tetramer in the solid state.

== Preparation and structure ==
TaF_{5} is prepared by treating tantalum metal with fluorine gas.

2 Ta + 5 F_{2} → 2 TaF_{5}

NbF_{5} is prepared similarly.

Solid and molten TaF_{5} is tetrameric, consisting of four octahedral TaF_{6} centers linked via bridging fluoride centers. Gaseous TaF_{5} is monomeric and adopts the trigonal bipyramidal structure with D_{3h} symmetry.

== Reactions and derivatives ==
The tendency of TaF_{5} to form clusters in the solid state indicates the Lewis acidity of the monomer. Indeed, TaF_{5} reacts with fluoride sources to give the ions [TaF_{6}]^{−} (hexafluorotantalate(V)), [TaF_{7}]^{2−} (heptafluorotantalate(V)), and [TaF_{8}]^{3−} (octafluorotantalate(V)). With neutral Lewis bases, such as diethyl ether, TaF_{5} forms adducts.

TaF_{5} is used in combination with HF as a catalyst for the alkylation of alkanes and alkenes and for the protonation of aromatic compounds. The TaF_{5}–HF superacid system is stable in reducing environments, unlike SbF_{5}–HF. In the presence of fluoride, tantalum pentafluoride forms the anions [TaF_{8}]^{3−}, [TaF_{7}]^{2−}, or [TaF_{6}]^{−}, depending on the nature of the counterion and the concentration of HF. High concentrations of HF favor the hexafluoride by virtue of the formation of [HF_{2}]^{−}:

[TaF_{7}]^{2−} + HF ⇌ [TaF_{6}]^{−} + [HF_{2}]^{−}

The salts M_{3}TaF_{8} have been crystallized. For M = K, the crystals consist of [TaF_{7}]^{2−} anions together with fluoride that does not coordinate to Ta(V), and the salt is actually potassium fluoride heptafluorotantalate(V) (K^{+})_{3}[TaF_{7}]^{2−}F^{−}. For M = Na, the crystals features [TaF_{8}]^{3−}, and the salt is sodium octafluorotantalate(V) (Na^{+})_{3}[TaF_{8}]^{3−}.

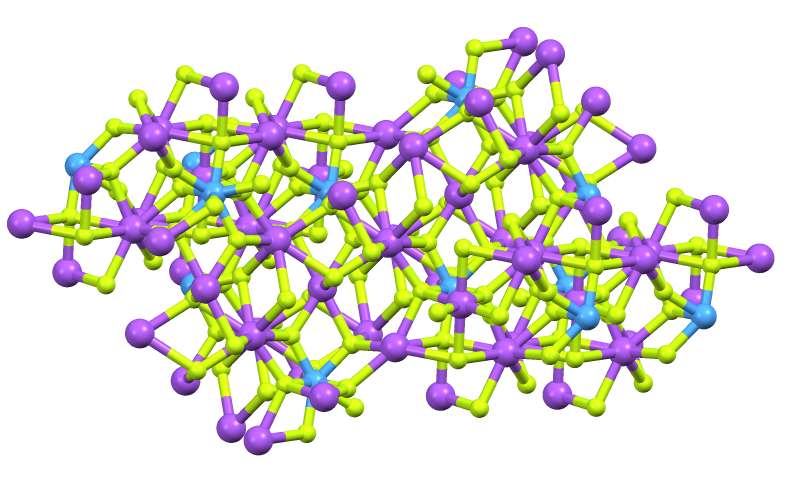
Section of the Na_{3}[TaF_{8}] structure (Ta = turquoise, F = green).

=== Relevance to separation of Ta and Nb ===
In the Marignac process, Nb and Ta are separated by fractional crystallization of K_{2}[TaF_{7}] from solutions of hydrofluoric acid. Under these conditions, niobium forms K_{2}[NbOF_{5}], which is more soluble than K_{2}[TaF_{7}]. Reduction of K_{2}[TaF_{7}] with sodium gives metallic Ta.
