= Ammonium hexaiodoplatinate(IV) =

Names
- Other names Ammonium hexaiodoplatinate

Identifiers
3D model (JSmol)	Interactive image
- InChI: InChI=1S/6HI.2H3N.Pt/h6*1H;2*1H3;/q;;;;;;;;+4/p-4 Key: MMORLWYTUHXLHL-UHFFFAOYSA-J
- SMILES: [NH4+].[NH4+].I[Pt-2](I)(I)(I)(I)I

Properties
Chemical formula	(NH_{4})_{2}[PtI_{6}]
Molar mass	992.589 g·mol^{−1}
Appearance	dark-red solid
Density	4.68 g/cm^{3}
Solubility in water	sparingly soluble

Structure
Crystal structure	cubic
Space group	Fm3m
Lattice constant	a = 1115.8 pm, b = 1115.8 pm, c = 1115.8 pm α = 90°, β = 90°, γ = 90°
Lattice volume (V)	1389×10^{6} pm^{3}
Formula units (Z)	4 units per cell
- Except where otherwise noted, data are given for materials in their standard state (at 25 °C [77 °F], 100 kPa). Infobox references

Ammonium hexaiodoplatinate(IV) is an inorganic compound with the chemical formula (NH_{4})_{2}[PtI_{6}]. It forms dark-red, cubic crystals.

== Preparation ==
Ammonium hexaiodoplatinate can be prepared by heating platinum tetraiodide or hexachloroplatinic acid in a saturated solution of ammonium iodide in the presence of hydroiodic acid and iodine.

== Chemical properties ==
The compound is unstable and decomposes in aqueous solutions:

(NH_{4})_{2}[PtI_{6}] → 2NH_{4}I + PtI_{4}
