= Niobium(IV) iodide =

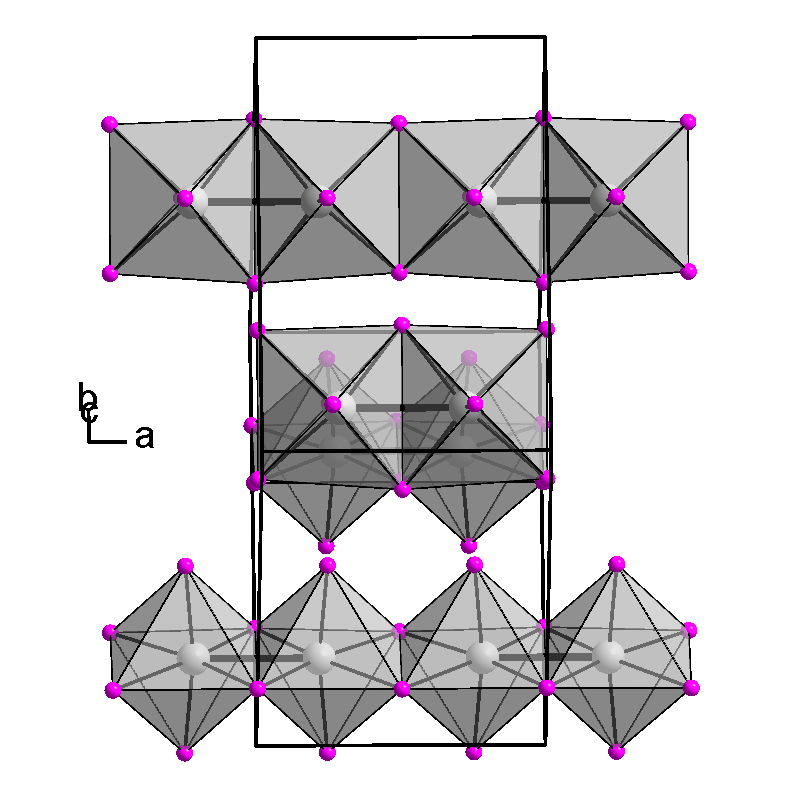

Names
- Other names Niobium tetraiodide

Identifiers
CAS Number	13870-21-8
3D model (JSmol)	Interactive image
PubChem CID	14475414
- InChI: InChI=1S/4HI.Nb/h4*1H;/q;;;;+4/p-4 Key: RRKNUGROPHXWKT-UHFFFAOYSA-J
- SMILES: [I-].[I-].[I-].[I-].[Nb+4]

Properties
Chemical formula	I_{4}Nb
Molar mass	600.52425 g·mol^{−1}
Appearance	grey solid
Density	5.6 g·cm^{−3}
Melting point	503 °C
Solubility in water	reacts

Related compounds
Other anions	NbF_{4}, NbCl_{4}, NbBr_{4}
Other cations	TaI_{4}
Related compounds	NbI_{3}, NbI_{5}
- Except where otherwise noted, data are given for materials in their standard state (at 25 °C [77 °F], 100 kPa). Infobox references

Niobium(IV) iodide is an iodide of niobium, with the chemical formula of NbI_{4}.

== Preparation ==
Niobium(IV) iodide can be obtained by the decomposition of niobium(V) iodide under a vacuum at 206-270 °C.

== Properties ==
Niobium(IV) iodide is a grey solid that reacts with water.

Niobium(IV) iodide is an orthorhombic crystal with space group Cmc2_{1} (No. 36). Its crystal is formed by NbI_{6} octahedra connected by edges and also contains Nb-Nb bonds. At 348 to 417 °C, the crystal structure of niobium(IV) iodide changes. Niobium(IV) iodide turns into a metal under extremely high pressure.
