= Tantalum(V) iodide =

Names
- Other names Tantalum pentaiodide

Identifiers
CAS Number	14693-81-3 TaI_{5}; 26814-38-0 Ta_{2}I_{10}
3D model (JSmol)	monomer: Interactive image; dimer: Interactive image
ChemSpider	76319
EC Number	238-742-4
PubChem CID	84598
- InChI: InChI=1S/5HI.Ta/h5*1H;/q;;;;;+5/p-5 Key: MISXNQITXACHNJ-UHFFFAOYSA-I
- SMILES: monomer: I[Ta](I)(I)(I)I; dimer: I[Ta-]1(I)(I)(I)[I+][Ta-]([I+]1)(I)(I)(I)I

Properties
Chemical formula	Ta_{2}I_{10}
Molar mass	1630.94046 g·mol^{−1}
Appearance	black solid
Density	5.8 g/cm^{3}
Melting point	382 °C (720 °F; 655 K) sublimes

Hazards
- GHS labelling
Pictograms	(GHS05: Corrosive) (GHS06: Toxic)
Signal word	Danger
Hazard statements	H314, H331
Precautionary statements	P260, P264, P271, P280, P301+P330+P331, P303+P361+P353, P304+P340, P305+P351+P338, P310, P311, P321, P363, P403+P233, P405, P501

Related compounds
Other anions	Tantalum(V) fluoride; Tantalum(V) chloride; Tantalum(V) bromide
Other cations	Protactinium(V) iodide; Niobium(V) iodide
Related compounds	Tantalum(IV) iodide
- Except where otherwise noted, data are given for materials in their standard state (at 25 °C [77 °F], 100 kPa). Infobox references

Tantalum(V) iodide is the inorganic compound with the formula Ta_{2}I_{10}. Its name comes from the compound's empirical formula, TaI_{5}. It is a diamagnetic, black solid that hydrolyses readily. The compound adopts an edge-shared bioctahedral structure, which means that two TaI_{5} units are joined by a pair of iodide bridges. There is no bond between the Ta centres. Niobium(V) chloride, niobium(V) bromide, niobium(V) iodide, tantalum(V) chloride, and tantalum(V) bromide all share this structural motif.

== Synthesis and structure ==
Tantalum pentaiodide forms from the reaction of tantalum pentoxide with aluminium triiodide:

3 Ta_{2}O_{5} + 10 AlI_{3} → 6 TaI_{5} + 5 Al_{2}O_{3}
