= Niobium(V) fluoride =

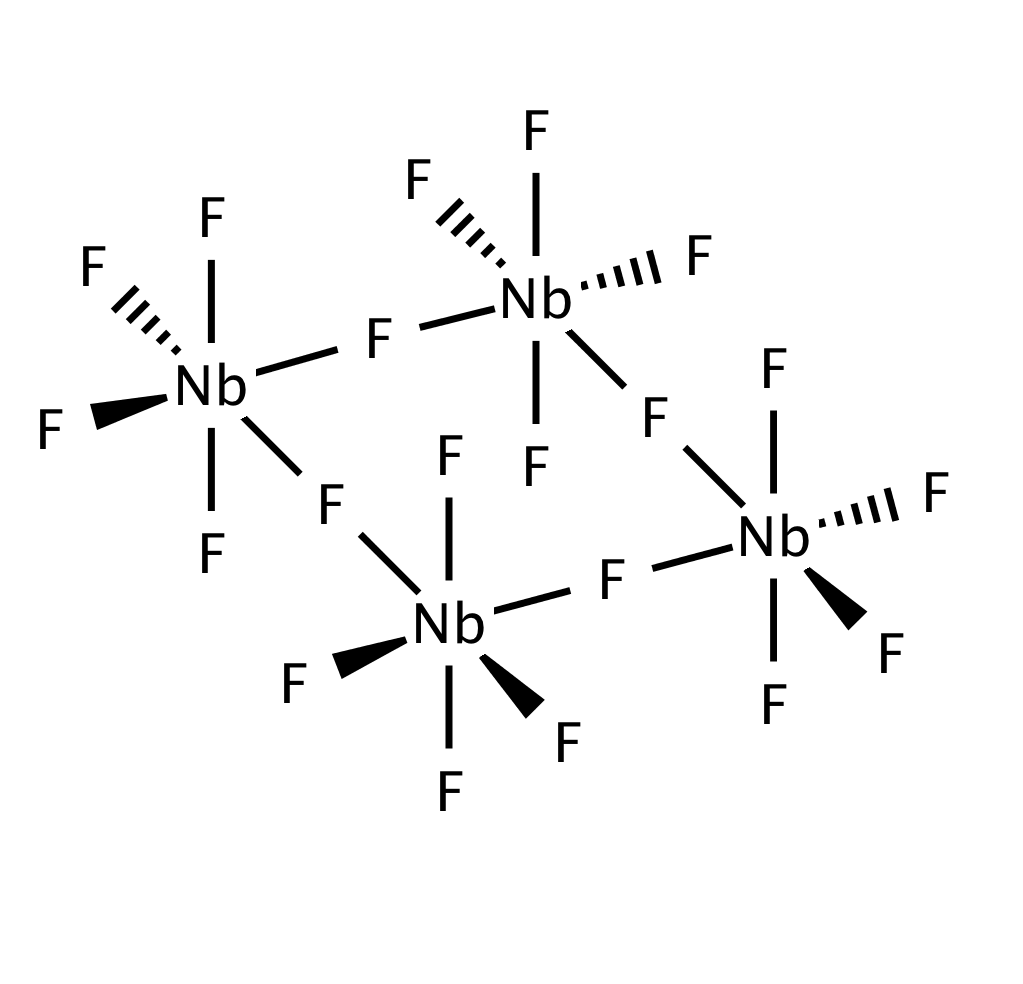

Names
- IUPAC names Niobium(V) fluoride Niobium pentafluoride

Identifiers
| CAS Number | 7783-68-8 |
| 3D model (JSmol) | Interactive image |
| ChemSpider | 74197 |
| ECHA InfoCard | 100.029.109 |
| EC Number | 232-020-2 |
| PubChem CID | 82217 |
| UNII | T86H76439H |
| CompTox Dashboard (EPA) | DTXSID0064832 |
- InChI: InChI=1S/5FH.Nb/h5*1H;/q;;;;;+5/p-5 Key: AOLPZAHRYHXPLR-UHFFFAOYSA-I
- SMILES: F[Nb](F)(F)(F)F

Properties
| Chemical formula | F_{5}Nb |
| Molar mass | 187.89839 g·mol^{−1} |
| Appearance | colorless hygroscopic solid |
| Density | 3.293 g/cm^{3} |
| Melting point | 72 to 73 °C (162 to 163 °F; 345 to 346 K) |
| Boiling point | 236 °C (457 °F; 509 K) |
| Solubility in water | reacts |
| Solubility | slightly soluble in chloroform, carbon disulfide, sulfuric acid |

Hazards
- GHS labelling
| Pictograms | (GHS05: Corrosive) (GHS07: Exclamation mark) |
| Signal word | Warning |
| Hazard statements | H302, H312, H314, H332 |
| Precautionary statements | P260, P264, P270, P271, P280, P301+P312, P301+P330+P331, P302+P352, P303+P361+P353, P304+P312, P304+P340, P305+P351+P338, P310, P312, P321, P322, P330, P363, P405, P501 |
| Flash point | Non-flammable |

Related compounds
| Other anions | Niobium(V) chloride Niobium(V) bromide Niobium(V) iodide |
| Other cations | Vanadium(V) fluoride Tantalum(V) fluoride |
| Related niobium fluorides | Niobium(III) fluoride Niobium(IV) fluoride |
- Except where otherwise noted, data are given for materials in their standard state (at 25 °C [77 °F], 100 kPa). verify (what is ?) Infobox references

Niobium(V) fluoride, also known as niobium pentafluoride, is the inorganic compound with the formula NbF_{5}. It is a colorless solid.

== Preparation and structure ==
Niobium pentafluoride is obtained by treatment of any niobium compound with fluorine:

2 Nb + 5 F_{2} → 2 NbF_{5}
2 NbCl_{5} + 5 F_{2} → 2 NbF_{5} + 5 Cl_{2}

As shown by X-ray crystallography, the solid consists of tetramers [NbF_{5}]_{4}. This structure is related to those for TaF_{5} and WOF_{4}.

== Reactions ==
It reacts with hydrogen fluoride to give H_{2}NbF_{7}, a superacid. In hydrofluoric acid, NbF_{5} converts to [NbF_{7}]^{2-} and [NbF_{5}O]^{2-}. The relative solubility of K_{2}[MF_{5}O] (M = Nb, Ta) is the basis of the Marignac process for separation of Nb and Ta.

NbCl_{5} forms a dimeric structure (edge-shared bioctahedron) in contrast to the corner-shared tetrameric structure of the fluoride.
