= Tantalum(III) chloride =

Chemical compound

Names
- Other names tantalum trichloride

Identifiers
CAS Number	13569-67-0
3D model (JSmol)	Interactive image
ChemSpider	75412
ECHA InfoCard	100.033.611
EC Number	236-988-7
PubChem CID	83582
CompTox Dashboard (EPA)	DTXSID3065538
- InChI: InChI=1S/3ClH.Ta/h3*1H;/q;;;+3/p-3 Key: UDKRLEXYBPHRQF-UHFFFAOYSA-K
- SMILES: Cl[Ta](Cl)Cl

Properties
Chemical formula	Cl_{3}Ta
Molar mass	287.30 g·mol^{−1}
Appearance	black-green
Melting point	440 °C (824 °F; 713 K) decomposes
Solubility in water	yes

Related compounds
Other anions	Tantalum(III) bromide Tantalum(III) iodide
Other cations	Niobium(III) chloride
Related compounds	Ta_{6}Cl_{15} Tantalum(IV) chloride Tantalum(V) chloride
- Except where otherwise noted, data are given for materials in their standard state (at 25 °C [77 °F], 100 kPa). Infobox references

Tantalum(III) chloride or tantalum trichloride is a non-stoichiometric chemical compound with a range of composition from TaCl_{2.9} to TaCl_{3.1} Anionic and neutral clusters containing Ta(III) chloride include [Ta_{6}Cl_{18}]^{4−} and [Ta_{6}Cl_{14}](H_{2}O)_{4}.

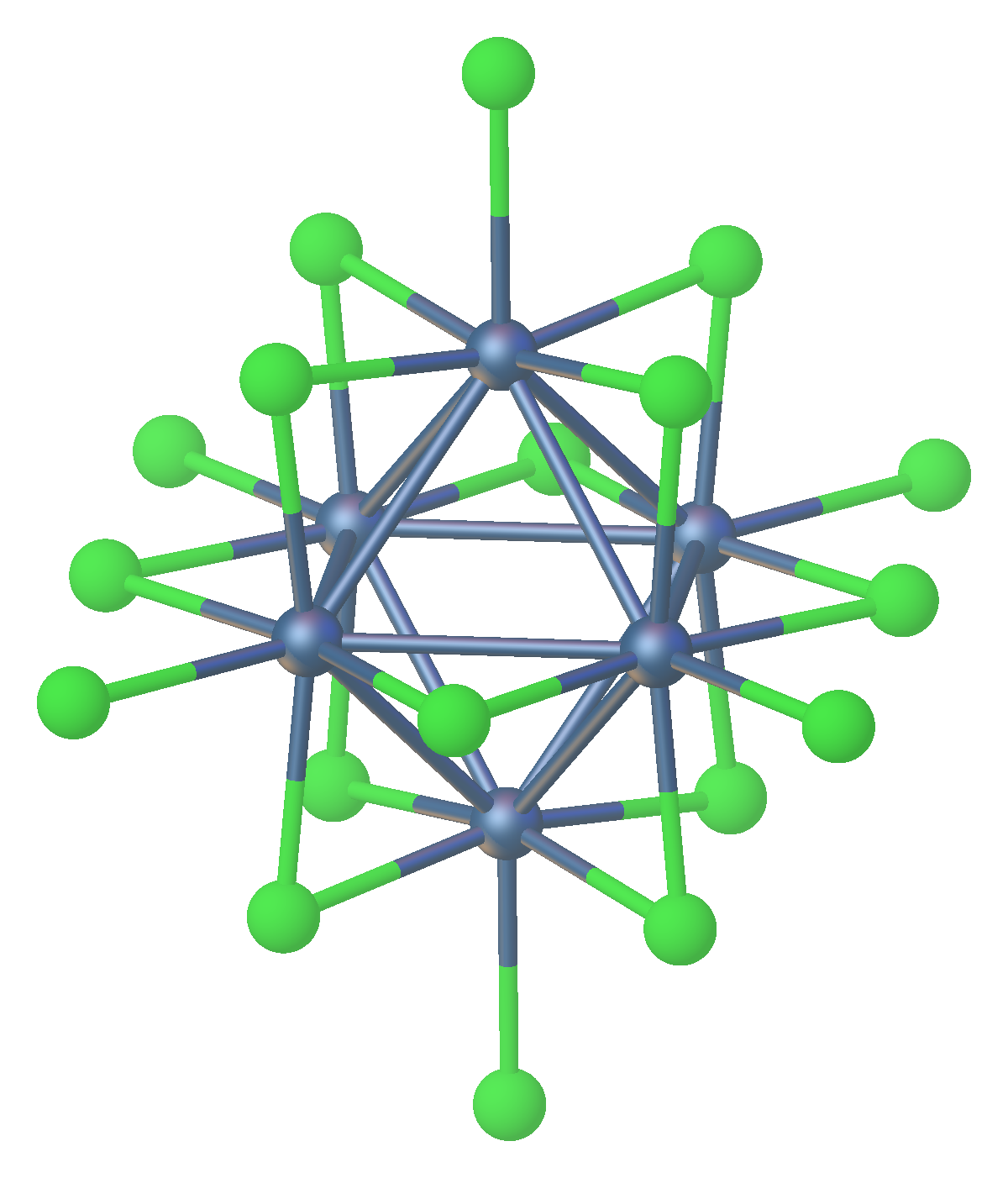
Structure of edge-capped octahedral clusters such as Ta_{6}Cl_{18}^{2−}.

== Formation ==
Tantalum(III) chloride is formed by reducing tantalum(V) chloride with tantalum metal. this is done by heating tantalum(III) chloride to 305 °C, passing the vapour over tantalum foil at 600°, and condensing the trichloride at 365 °C. If the condensing region is kept at too high a temperature, then TaCl_{2.5} deposits instead.

The trichloride can also be prepared by thermal decomposition of TaCl_{4}, with removal of volatile TaCl_{5}. TaCl_{5} can be vapourised, leaving behind TaCl_{3}.

"Salt-free reduction" of a toluene solution of TaCl_{5} with 1,4-disilyl-cyclohexadiene in the presence of ethylene produces a complex of TaCl_{3}:

TaCl_{5} + C_{6}H_{6}(SiMe_{3})_{2} → TaCl_{3} + C_{6}H_{6} + 2 Me_{3}SiCl

== Properties ==
Above 500 °C, TaCl_{3} disproportionates further, releasing TaCl_{5}. TaCl_{3} is insoluble in room-temperature water or dilute acid, but dissolves in boiling water. A blue-green solution is formed.

== Complexes ==
Tantalum(III) chloride can form complexes with some ligands as a monomer or dimer.

Complexes include Ta(=C-CMe_{3})(PMe_{3})_{2}Cl_{3}, [TaCl_{3}(P(CH_{2}C_{6}H_{5})_{3}THF]_{2}μ-N_{2} and [TaCl_{3}THF_{2}]_{2}μ-N_{2} (dinitrogen complexes).

As a dimer, complexes include Ta_{2}Cl_{6}(SC_{4}H_{8})_{3} (SC_{4}H_{8}=tetrahydrothiophene). Ta_{2}Cl_{6}(SMe_{2})_{3}, Ta_{2}Cl_{6}(thiane)_{3} and Ta_{2}Cl_{6}(thiolane)_{3} have a double bond between the two tantalum atoms, and two bridging chlorides, and a bridging ligand.
