= Iridium(III) bromide =

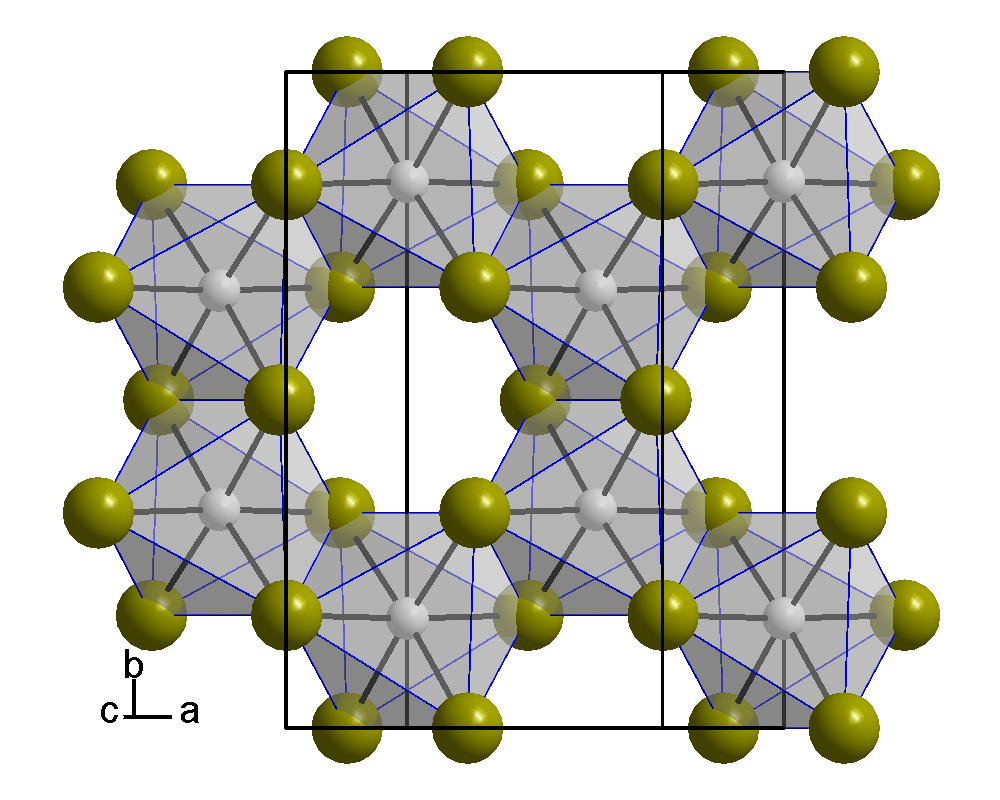
- Crystal structure

Identifiers
| CAS Number | 10049-24-8 anhydride; 13464-83-0 tetrahydrate |
| 3D model (JSmol) | Interactive image |
| ChemSpider | 74295 |
| ECHA InfoCard | 100.030.146 |
| EC Number | 233-174-3 |
| PubChem CID | 82324 |
| CompTox Dashboard (EPA) | DTXSID3064932 |
- InChI: InChI=1S/3BrH.Ir/h3*1H;/q;;;+3/p-3 Key: HTFVQFACYFEXPR-UHFFFAOYSA-K
- SMILES: Br[Ir](Br)Br

Properties
| Chemical formula | Br_{3}Ir |
| Molar mass | 431.929 g·mol^{−1} |
| Appearance | dark reddish-brown solid |
| Density | 6.82 g·cm^{−3} |
| Solubility in water | insoluble |
| Solubility | insoluble in acids and bases |

Hazards
- GHS labelling
| Pictograms | (GHS07: Exclamation mark) |
| Signal word | Warning |
| Hazard statements | H315, H319, H335 |
| Precautionary statements | P261, P264, P264+P265, P271, P280, P302+P352, P304+P340, P305+P351+P338, P319, P321, P332+P317, P337+P317, P362+P364, P403+P233, P405, P501 |

Related compounds
| Other anions | Iridium(III) hydroxide Iridium(III) chloride Iridium(III) iodide |
| Other cations | Ruthenium(III) bromide Rhodium(III) bromide Osmium(III) bromide Platinum(III) bromide |
| Related compounds | Iridium(II) bromide |
- Except where otherwise noted, data are given for materials in their standard state (at 25 °C [77 °F], 100 kPa). Infobox references

Iridium(III) bromide is an inorganic compound, a bromide of iridium(III), with the chemical formula of IrBr_{3}.

== Properties ==
Iridium(III) bromide is a dark reddish-brown solid that is insoluble soluble in water, acids, and alkalis and decomposes to iridium(II) bromide on heating. The light olive green tetrahydrate is slightly soluble in water but insoluble in ethanol and ether. When heated to 100 °C, it turns dark brown with release of water and decomposes to iridium and bromine at higher temperatures.

== Structure ==
Iridium(III) bromide crystallizes in a highly disordered layered structure of aluminum(III) chloride or chromium(III) chloride type, where the monoclinic unit cell contains four formula units. As with rhenium(III) chloride, rhenium(III) bromide, α-iridium(III) chloride and α-ruthenium(III) chloride, the disorder is due to the different stacking of the metal layers.

== Preparation ==
Iridium(III) bromide can be formed by reacting iridium(II) bromide and bromine. Its tetrahydrate can be formed by reacting iridium dioxide dihydrate with hydrobromic acid. It can also be formed by the direct reaction of iridium and bromine at 8 atm and 570 °C.

== Reactions ==
Iridium(III) bromide reacts with germanium dibromide in hydrobromic acid solution to form a compound containing Ir-Ge bond, and adding Cs^{+} to it can separate Cs_{3}[Ir(GeBr_{3})_{n}Br_{6−n}] (n=1, 2, 3).
