= Niobium oxychloride =

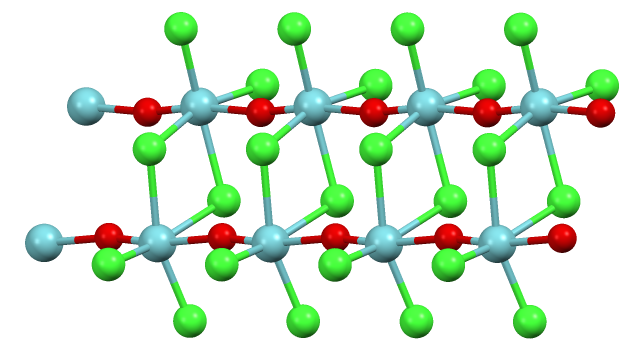

Names
- IUPAC name Niobium (V) Oxychloride
- Other names Niobium oxytrichloride

Identifiers
CAS Number	13597-20-1
3D model (JSmol)	Interactive image
- InChI: InChI=1S/3ClH.Nb.O/h3*1H;;/q;;;+3;/p-3 Key: SEEQRJAHRTUYAE-UHFFFAOYSA-K
- SMILES: O=[Nb](Cl)(Cl)Cl

Properties
Chemical formula	Cl_{3}NbO
Molar mass	215.26 g·mol^{−1}
Appearance	white crystals
Melting point	sublimes above 200 °C
- Except where otherwise noted, data are given for materials in their standard state (at 25 °C [77 °F], 100 kPa). verify (what is ?) Infobox references

Niobium oxychloride is the inorganic compound with the formula NbOCl_{3}. It is a white, crystalline, diamagnetic solid. It is often found as an impurity in samples of niobium pentachloride, a common reagent in niobium chemistry.

== Structure ==
In the solid state the coordination sphere for niobium is a distorted octahedron. The Nb–O bonds and Nb–Cl bonds are unequal. This structure can be described as planar Nb_{2}Cl_{6} core connected by O–Nb–O bridges. In this way, the compound is best described as a polymer, consisting of a double stranded chain.

In the gas phase above 320 °C the Raman spectrum is consistent with a pyramidal monomer containing a niobium–oxygen double bond.

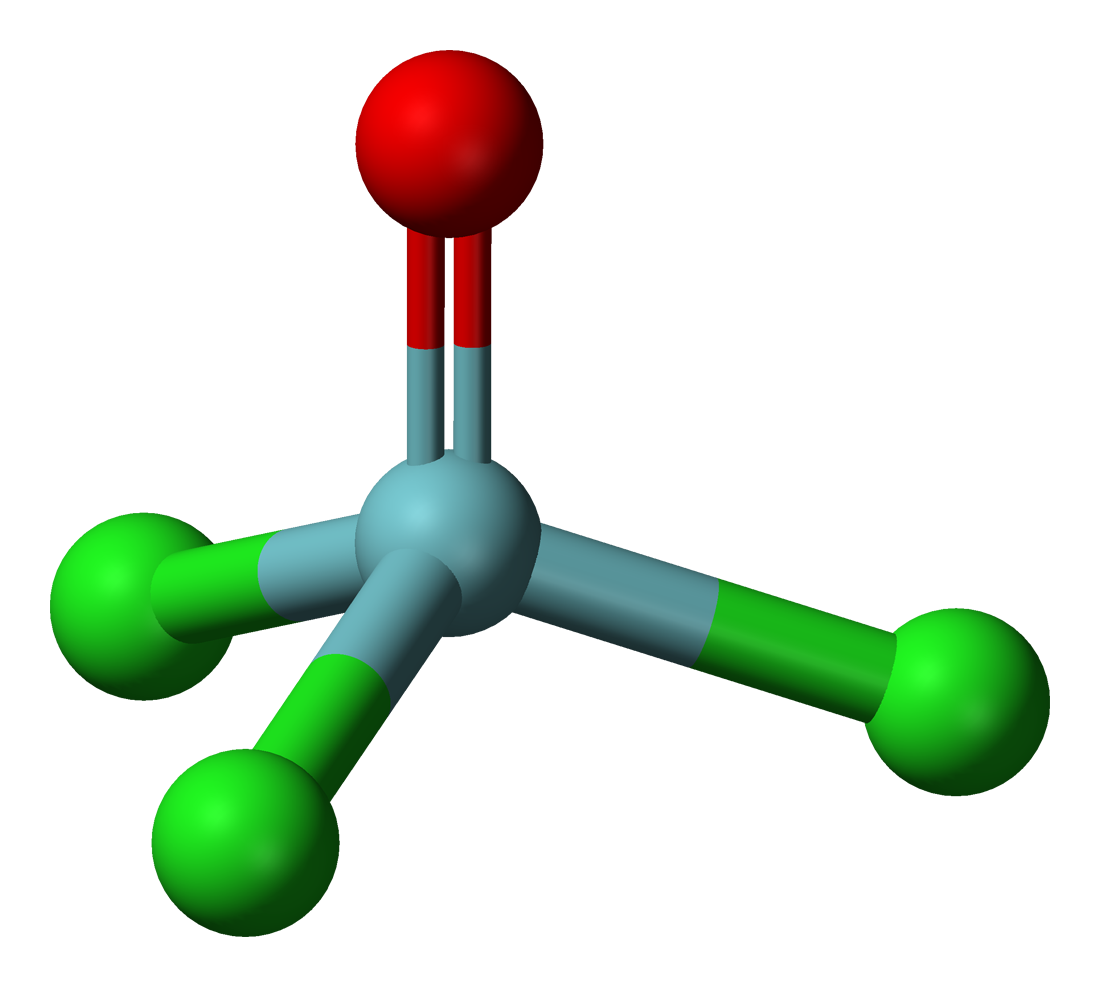
Gaseous NbOCl_{3} is a tetrahedral molecule.

== Synthesis ==
Niobium oxychloride is prepared by treating the pentachloride with oxygen:

NbCl_{5} + 1/2 O_{2} → NbOCl_{3} + Cl_{2}

This reaction is conducted at about 200 °C. NbOCl_{3} also forms as a major side-product in the reaction of niobium pentoxide with various chlorinating agents such as carbon tetrachloride and thionyl chloride.

2 Nb_{2}O_{5} + 6 CCl_{4} → 4 NbOCl_{3} + 6 COCl_{2}
