= Organoniobium chemistry =

Organoniobium chemistry is the chemistry of compounds containing niobium-carbon (Nb-C) bonds. Compared to the other group 5 transition metal organometallics, the chemistry of organoniobium compounds most closely resembles that of organotantalum compounds. Organoniobium compounds of oxidation states +5, +4, +3, +2, +1, 0, −1, and −3 have been prepared, with the +5 oxidation state being the most common.

== Compound classes ==
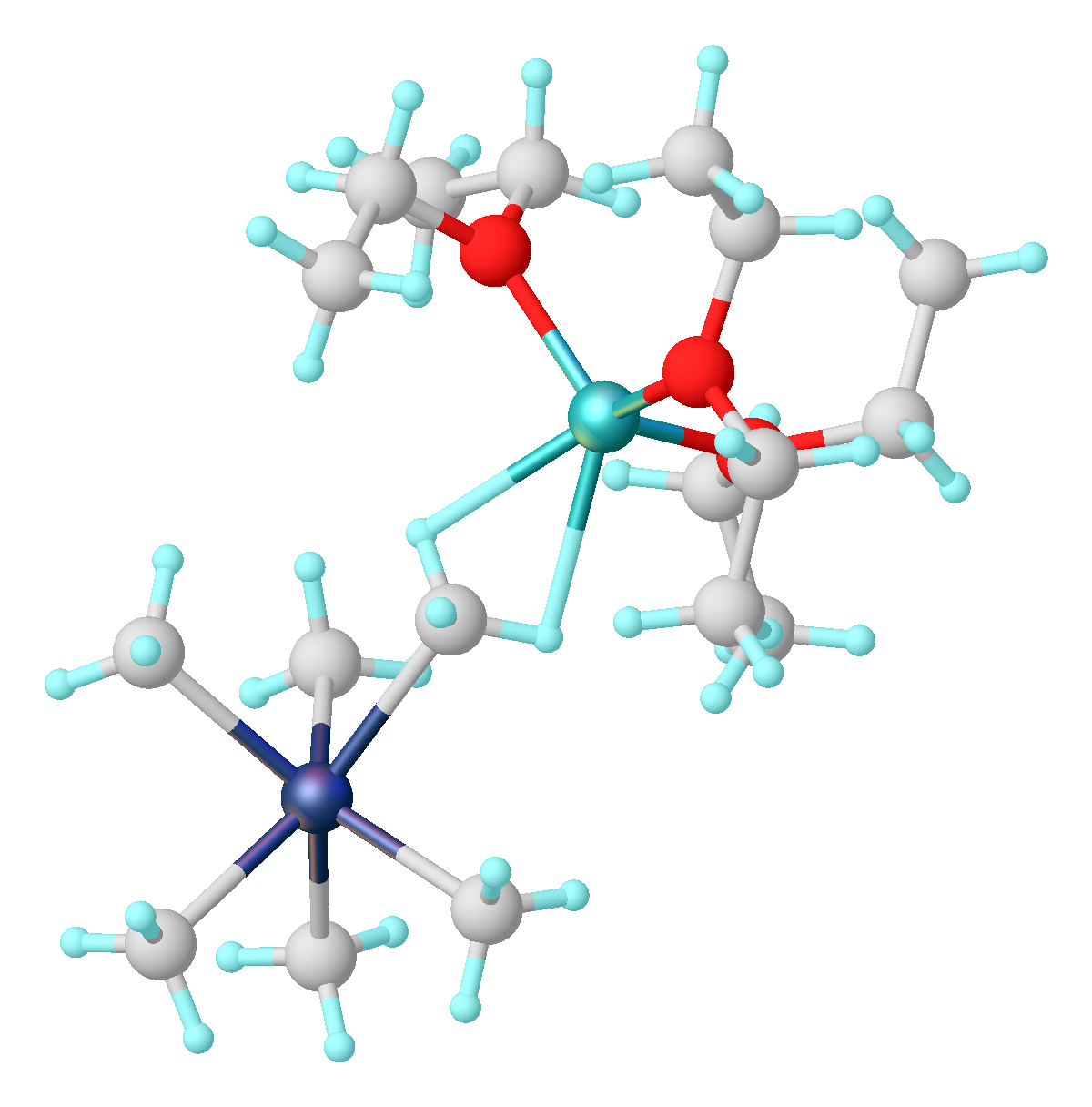
Structure of [Li(OEt_{2})_{3}]^{+}[NbMe_{6}]^{−}.

=== Carbonyls ===
Unlike vanadium, which forms the neutral hexacarbonyl, niobium does not easily form an analogous complex. The salts of the anionic binary carbonyl, [Nb(CO)_{6}]^{−}, are however well characterized. They are obtained by reduction of NbCl_{5} under an atmosphere of CO.

=== Alkyl ===
A wide variety of alkyl Nb compounds have been prepared. Low coordination number complexes require the absence of any β-hydrogen to prevent rapid β-hydride elimination. The simplest compounds are salts of [Nb(CH_{3})_{6}]^{−}, which is prepared by alkylation of NbF_{5} using methyl lithium:

NbF_{5} + 6 LiCH_{3} → Li[Nb(CH_{3})_{6}] + 5 LiF

=== Cyclopentadienyl derivatives ===
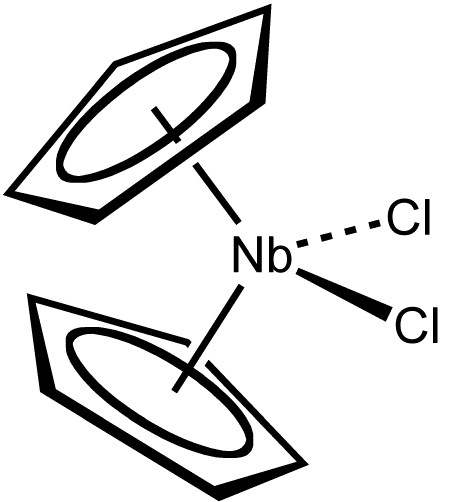
Niobocene dichloride ((C_{5}H_{5})_{2}NbCl_{2}).

The first organoniobium compound fully characterized was Cp_{2}NbBr_{3}, however the paramagnetic Nb(IV) metallocenes such as niobocene dichloride are more prevalent. Complexes are typically prepared by treatment of NbCl_{5} with NaCp to form the bis(cyclopentadienyl) complex followed by further functionalization. Derivatives of pentamethylcyclopentadiene are also known, such as (C_{5}Me_{5})_{2}NbH_{3}.

Niobium carbonyls supported by Cp ligands can be prepared at various oxidation states of Nb and serve as useful precursors in niobium carbonyl chemistry.

=== Alkylidenes ===
Along with the related organotantalum species, niobium alkylidenes were among the first Scrock carbenes studied. The first syntheses of these complexes involved addition of organolithium reagents lacking β-hydrogens into hindered Nb(V) complexes followed by α-proton elimination. As compared to tantalum alkylidenes, niobium alkylidenes are less thermally and hydrolytically stable.

=== Alkyne complexes ===
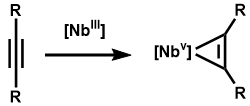
The adducts from Nb(III) and alkynes are often described as metallacyclopropenes.

Similar to other d^{2} transition metals, Nb(III) produce adducts with alkynes. These derivatives are sometimes called Nb(V) alkenediyls metallacyclopropenes. These alkendiyl complexes function as latent dianion equivalents. They react with electrophiles to give alkene derivatives.

== Applications ==
No commercial applications of organoniobium compounds have been reported. They have found limited use in organic synthesis.

=== Stoicheometric niobium reagents ===
A prominent early synthetic application of organoniobium chemistry was the use of dimethoxyethane niobium trichloride, NbCl_{3}(DME), as a reagent for the reductive coupling of imines with carbonyl compounds to form amino alcohols. This reagent has found further use in other pinacol-type reductive couplings.

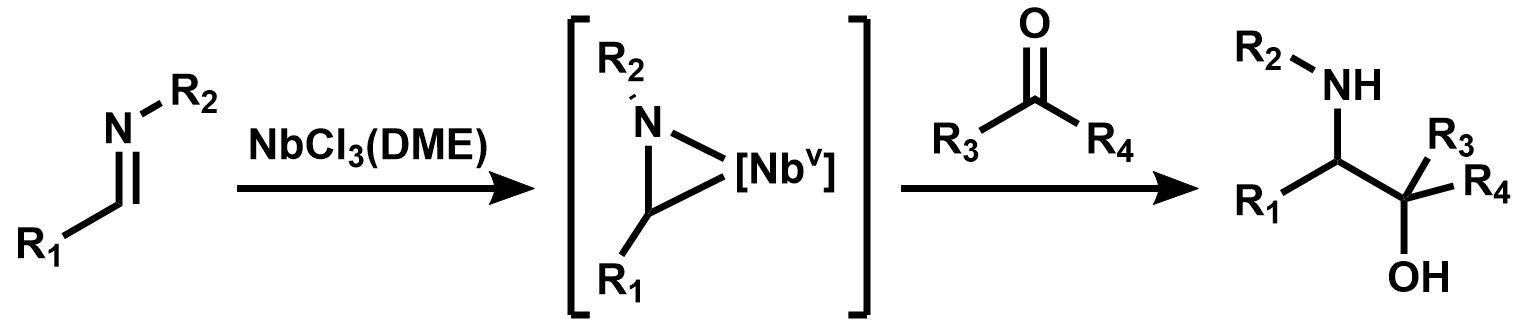
NbCl_{3}(DME) mediated reductive coupling. Hydrolysis step is shown with implicit water.

=== Catalytic reactions ===
A number of formal [2+2+2] cycloadditions have been realized under Nb catalysis, including alkyne trimerizations and couplings of alkynes with alkenes or nitriles to form cyclohexadienes or pyridines, respectively. Typically a Nb(III) catalyst will form a Nb(V) metallocyclopropene with a terminal alkyne component and then engage in sequential migratory insertions and reductive elimination to furnish the six membered ring and regenerate the Nb(III).

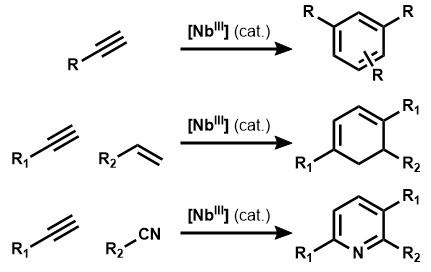
Nb(III) catalyzed formal [2+2+2] cycloadditions

An organoniobium catalyst has also been developed for (Z)-selective semihydrogenation of alkynes. The mechanistic pathway for this reaction is distinct from other transition metal catalyzed hydrogenations, proceeding through the Nb(V) metallocyclopropene which engages with hydrogen either through direct sigma-bond metathesis or outer sphere 1,2-addition.

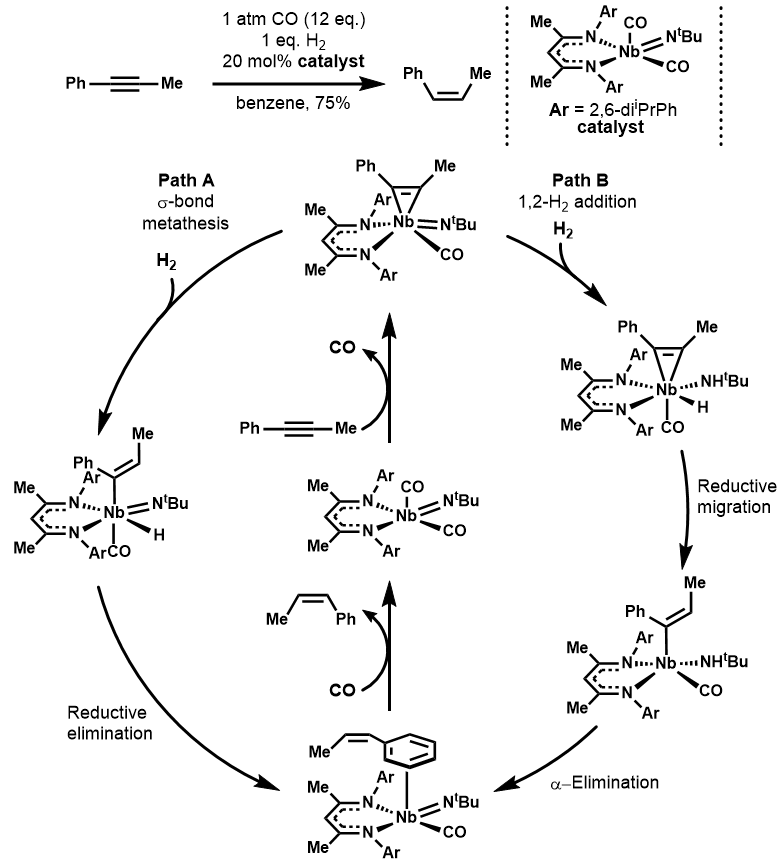
Nb(III) catalyzed alkyne semihydrogenation
