= Iridium(III) iodide =

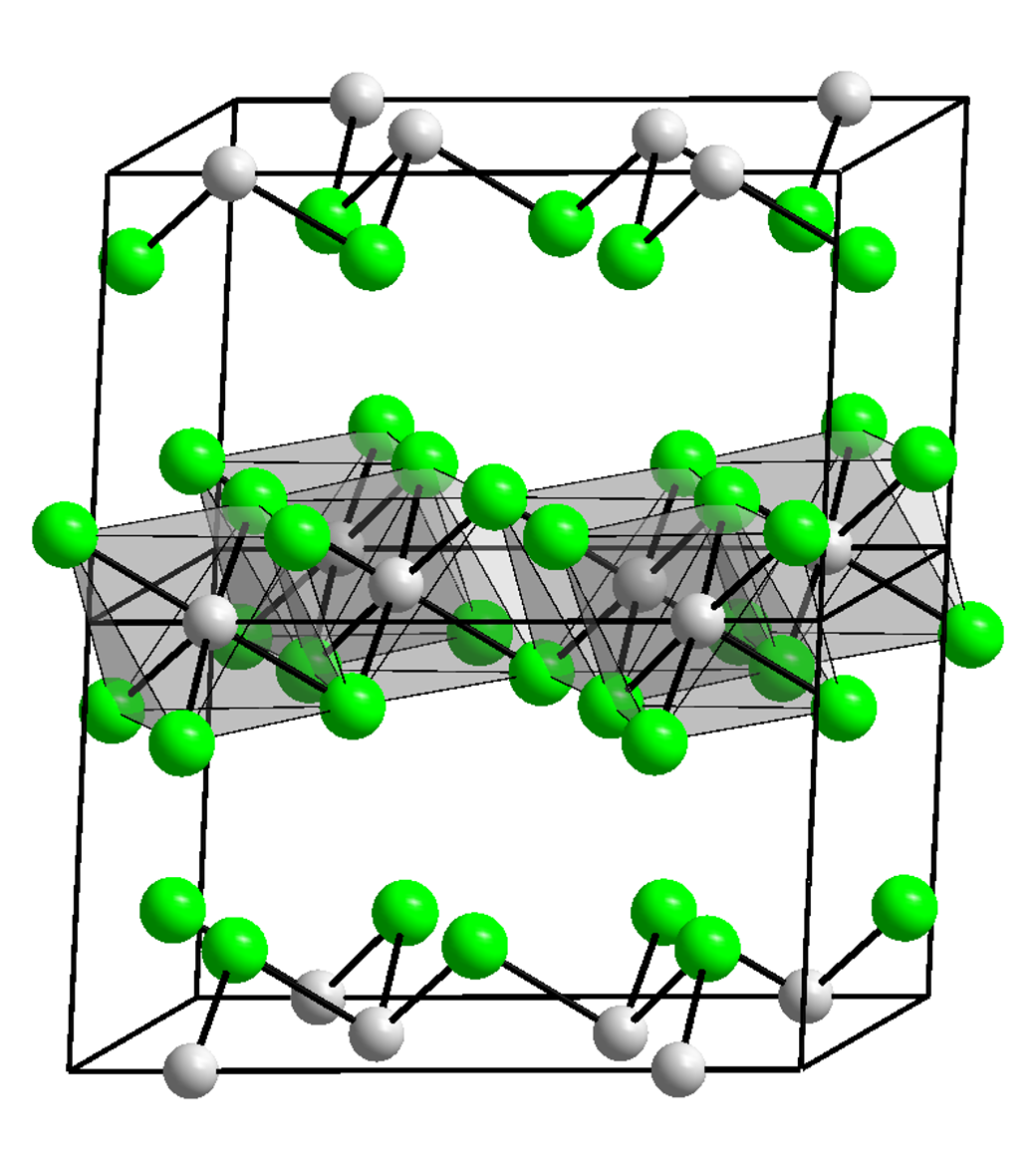

Names
- Other names Iridium triiodide

Identifiers
CAS Number	7790-41-2
3D model (JSmol)	Interactive image; dihydrate: Interactive image; trihydrate: Interactive image
ChemSpider	9226575
PubChem CID	18534463
CompTox Dashboard (EPA)	DTXSID00453279
- InChI: InChI=1S/3HI.Ir/h3*1H;/q;;;+3/p-3 Key: WUHYYTYYHCHUID-UHFFFAOYSA-K
- SMILES: [I-].[I-].[I-].[Ir+3]; dihydrate: O.O.[I-].[I-].[I-].[Ir+3]; trihydrate: O.O.O.[I-].[I-].[I-].[Ir+3]

Properties
Chemical formula	I_{3}Ir
Molar mass	572.930 g·mol^{−1}
Appearance	dark brown solid
Density	7.4 g·cm^{−3}
Solubility	insoluble in water and benzene

Related compounds
Other anions	iridium(III) hydroxide iridium(III) chloride Iridium(III) bromide
Other cations	Rhodium(III) iodide
Related compounds	Iridium(IV) iodide
- Except where otherwise noted, data are given for materials in their standard state (at 25 °C [77 °F], 100 kPa). Infobox references

Iridium(III) iodide is an iodide of iridium, with the chemical formula of IrI_{3}.

== Preparation ==
Iridium(III) iodide can be obtained by reducing iridium(IV) iodide with hydrogen at 210 °C. It can also be formed by the reaction of iridium dioxide or iridium(III) hydroxide with hydrogen iodide.

== Chemical properties ==
Iridium(III) iodide is a dark brown solid that is insoluble in water. It is monoclinic like chromium trichloride. Its trihydrate is yellow and can be dehydrated into the dihydrate or anhydrous form on heating. Iridium(III) iodide also has a monohydrate.
