= Iridium(IV) iodide =

Names
- Other names Iridium(IV) iodide, tetraiodoiridium

Identifiers
CAS Number	7790-45-6
3D model (JSmol)	Interactive image
ChemSpider	22504631
ECHA InfoCard	100.029.279
EC Number	232-206-3
PubChem CID	25113453
CompTox Dashboard (EPA)	DTXSID70999093
- InChI: InChI=1S/4HI.Ir/h4*1H;/q;;;;+4/p-4 Key: BUUWLOZTIYBNKB-UHFFFAOYSA-J
- SMILES: I[Ir](I)(I)I

Properties
Chemical formula	I_{4}Ir
Molar mass	699.835 g·mol^{−1}
Appearance	Black powder
Melting point	100 °C (212 °F; 373 K)
Solubility in water	insoluble

Structure
Crystal structure	hexagonal

Related compounds
Related compounds	Iridium triiodide, platinum tetraiodide

Hazards
- GHS labelling
Pictograms	(GHS07: Exclamation mark)
Signal word	Warning
Hazard statements	H315, H319, H335
Precautionary statements	P261, P264, P264+P265, P271, P280, P302+P352, P304+P340, P305+P351+P338, P319, P321, P332+P317, P337+P317, P362+P364, P403+P233, P405, P501
- Except where otherwise noted, data are given for materials in their standard state (at 25 °C [77 °F], 100 kPa). Infobox references

Iridium(IV) iodide is a binary inorganic compound of iridium and iodide with the chemical formula IrI_{4}.

== Properties ==
Iridium tetraiodide forms black crystals, does not dissolve in water and alcohol. In alkali metal iodide solutions, the compound dissolves easily to give a ruby red solution, forming complex salts.

The compound decomposes when heated:

IrI_{4} → Ir + 2I_{2}

== Preparation ==
Iridium(IV) iodide can be obtained by reacting dipotassium hexachloroiridate or hexachloroiridic acid with an aqueous solution of potassium iodide.

== Uses ==
Iridium(IV) iodide can be used as a catalyst in organic chemistry.
