= Tantalum(IV) iodide =

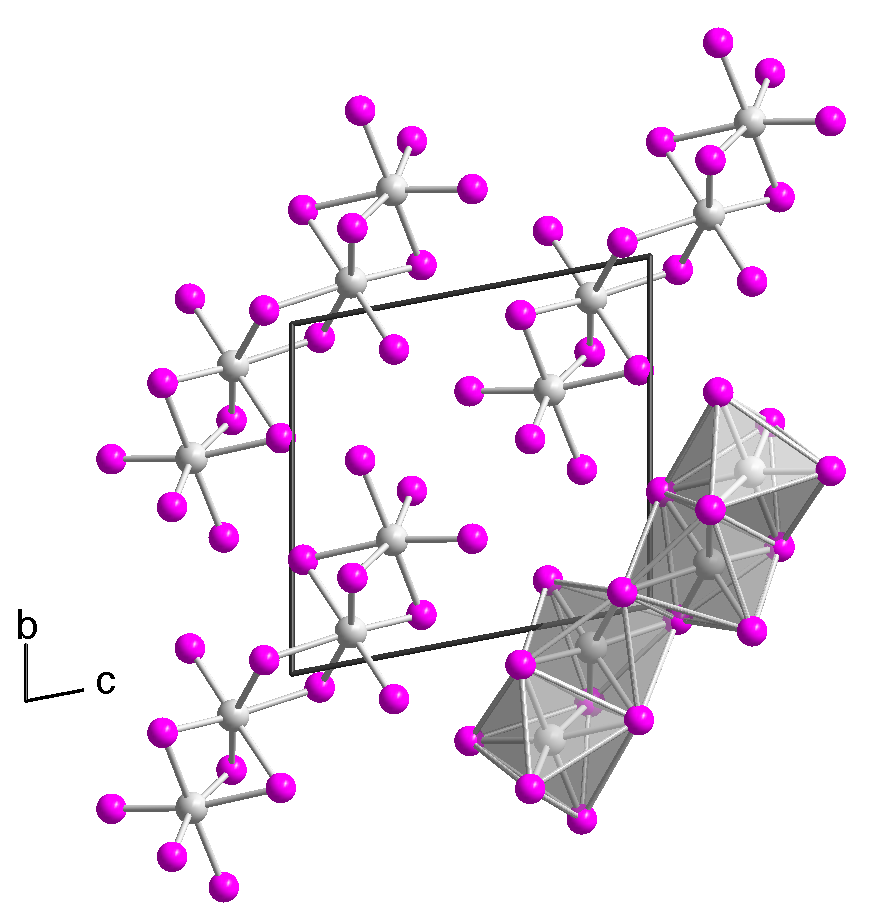

Identifiers
CAS Number	14693-80-2
3D model (JSmol)	Interactive image
PubChem CID	140060775
- InChI: InChI=1S/4HI.Ta/h4*1H;/q;;;;+4/p-4 Key: YGGDPBCUKJOEGM-UHFFFAOYSA-J
- SMILES: [I-].[I-].[I-].[I-].[Ta+4]

Properties
Chemical formula	TaI_{4}
Molar mass	688.57
Appearance	black solid
Melting point	398 °C (671 K) (decomposes)
- Except where otherwise noted, data are given for materials in their standard state (at 25 °C [77 °F], 100 kPa). Infobox references

Tantalum(IV) iodide is an inorganic compound with the chemical formula TaI_{4}. It dissolves in water to give a green solution, but the color fades when left in the air and produces a white precipitate.

== Preparation ==
Tantalum(IV) iodide can be prepared by the reduction reaction of tantalum(V) iodide and tantalum. If pyridine is used as the reducing agent, there is an adduct TaI_{4}(py)_{2}.

Tantalum(IV) iodide can also be obtained by reacting tantalum(V) iodide with aluminum, magnesium or calcium at 380 °C. Ta_{6}I_{14} is also formed. This makes it difficult to produce a very pure crystallized tantalum(IV) iodide.

3 TaI_{5} + Al → 3 TaI_{4} + AlI_{3}

== Properties ==
Tantalum(IV) iodide is a black solid. It has a crystal structure isotypic to that of niobium(IV) iodide. Single-crystalline tantalum(IV) iodide was first obtained in 2008 by Rafal Wiglusz and Gerd Meyer as a chance product of a reaction in a tantalum ampoule that was supposed to lead to the product Rb(Pr_{6}C_{2})I_{12}. The single crystal has a triclinic crystal structure with space group P1 (space group no. 2) with two formula units per unit cell (a = 707.36 pm, b = 1064.64 pm, c = 1074.99 pm, α = 100.440°, β = 89.824° and γ = 104.392°). The crystal structure differs from that of other transition metal tetraiodides, which usually have a MI_{4/2}I_{2/1} chain structure, as it consists of TaI_{6} octahedra bridged over a common surface to form a dimer. Two such dimers bridge over a common edge to form a tetramer.
