= Tungsten(IV) iodide =

Names
- IUPAC name Tungsten(IV) iodide
- Other names Tungsten tetraiodide

Identifiers
CAS Number	14055-84-6
3D model (JSmol)	Interactive image
PubChem CID	14345369
- InChI: InChI=1S/4HI.W/h4*1H;/q;;;;+4/p-4 Key: MMCXETIAXNXKPE-UHFFFAOYSA-J
- SMILES: I[W](I)(I)I

Properties
Chemical formula	I_{4}W
Molar mass	691.46 g·mol^{−1}
Appearance	black crystals
Solubility in water	insoluble
- Except where otherwise noted, data are given for materials in their standard state (at 25 °C [77 °F], 100 kPa). Infobox references

Tungsten(IV) iodide is a binary inorganic compound of tungsten metal and iodine with the chemical formula WI_{4}.

== Preparation ==
Reaction of tungsten(VI) chloride with gaseous hydrogen iodide or concentrated hydroiodic acid:

WCl_{6} + 6HI → WI_{4} + 6HCl + I_{2}

Reaction of tungsten(IV) chloride with hydroiodic acid:

WCl_{4} + 4HI → WI_{4} + 4HCl

== Physical properties ==
Tungsten(IV) iodide forms black crystals of the triclinic crystal system. Insoluble in cold water, diethyl ether, and chloroform. It dissolves in ethanol.

== Chemical properties ==
The compound decomposes when heated in vacuum:

WI_{4} → WI_{2} + I_{2}

It hydrolyzes in hot water:

WI_{4} + 2H_{2}O → WO_{2} + 4HI

Reacts with chlorine and bromine:

WI_{4} + 2Cl_{2} → WCl_{4} + 2I_{2}
WI_{4} + 2Br_{2} → WBr_{4} + 2I_{2}
