= Tantalum(V) chloride =

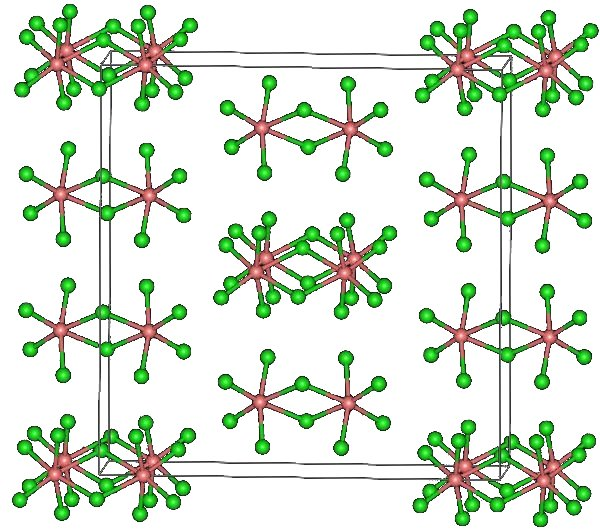
- Tantalum, Ta; Chlorine, Cl

Names
- IUPAC names Tantalum(V) chloride Tantalum pentachloride

Identifiers
CAS Number	7721-01-9 TaCl_{5}; 17499-29-5 Ta_{2}Cl_{10}
3D model (JSmol)	monomer: Interactive image; dimer: Interactive image
ChemSpider	22805
ECHA InfoCard	100.028.869
EC Number	231-755-6
PubChem CID	24394
UNII	9WXV40ZI4M
CompTox Dashboard (EPA)	DTXSID7064780
- InChI: Key: OEIMLTQPLAGXMX-UHFFFAOYSA-I; InChI=1S/5ClH.Ta/h5*1H;/q;;;;;+5/p-5
- SMILES: monomer: Cl[Ta](Cl)(Cl)(Cl)Cl; dimer: Cl[Ta-]1(Cl)(Cl)(Cl)[Cl+][Ta-]([Cl+]1)(Cl)(Cl)(Cl)Cl

Properties
Chemical formula	TaCl_{5}
Molar mass	358.213 g/mol
Appearance	white monoclinic crystals
Density	3.68 g/cm^{3}
Melting point	216 °C (421 °F; 489 K)
Boiling point	239.4 °C (462.9 °F; 512.5 K) (decomposes)
Solubility in water	reacts
Solubility	chloroform, CCl_{4}
Magnetic susceptibility (χ)	+140.0×10^{−6} cm^{3}/mol

Structure
Crystal structure	Monoclinic, mS72
Space group	C2/m, No. 12

Thermochemistry
Std molar entropy (S^{⦵}_{298})	221.75 J K^{−1} mol^{−1}
Std enthalpy of formation (Δ_{f}H^{⦵}_{298})	−858.98 kJ/mol

Hazards
- GHS labelling
Pictograms	(GHS05: Corrosive) (GHS07: Exclamation mark)
Signal word	Danger
Hazard statements	H302, H314, H335
Precautionary statements	P260, P264+P265, P270, P271, P280, P301+P317, P301+P330+P331, P302+P361+P354, P304+P340, P305+P351+P338, P305+P354+P338, P310, P316, P330, P363, P403+P233, P405, P501
NFPA 704 (fire diamond)	3 0 0
Flash point	Non-flammable
- Lethal dose or concentration (LD, LC)
LD_{50} (median dose)	1900 mg/kg (oral, rat)
Safety data sheet (SDS)	External SDS

Related compounds
Other anions	Tantalum(V) fluoride; Tantalum(V) bromide; Tantalum(V) iodide
Other cations	Protactinium(V) chloride; Vanadium(V) chloride; Niobium(V) chloride
Related compounds	Vanadium(IV) chloride; Tantalum(III) chloride; Tantalum(IV) chloride
- Except where otherwise noted, data are given for materials in their standard state (at 25 °C [77 °F], 100 kPa). verify (what is ?) Infobox references

Tantalum(V) chloride, also known as tantalum pentachloride, is an inorganic compound with the formula TaCl_{5}. It takes the form of a white powder, which is highly sensitive to moisture. It is synthesised and manipulated under anhydrous conditions, using air-free techniques.

== Structure ==
TaCl_{5} crystallizes in the monoclinic space group C2/m. The ten chlorine atoms define a pair of octahedra that share a common edge. The tantalum atoms occupy the centres of the octahedra and are joined by two chlorine bridging ligands. The dimeric structure Ta_{2}Cl_{10} is retained in non-complexing solvents and to a large extent in the molten state. In the vapour state, however, TaCl_{5} is monomeric. This monomer adopts a trigonal bipyramidal structure, like that of PCl_{5}.

== Synthesis ==
Tantalum pentachloride can be prepared by treating powdered metallic tantalum with chlorine gas at between 170 and 250 °C. This reaction can also be performed using HCl at 400 °C.

2 Ta + 5 Cl_{2} → 2 TaCl_{5}
2 Ta + 10 HCl → 2 TaCl_{5} + 5 H_{2}

It can also be prepared by a reaction between tantalum pentoxide and thionyl chloride at 240 °C.

Ta_{2}O_{5} + 5 SOCl_{2} → 2 TaCl_{5} + 5 SO_{2}

Tantalum pentachloride is commercially available, however samples can be contaminated with tantalum(V) oxytrichloride (TaOCl_{3}), formed by hydrolysis. Samples contaminated with niobium pentachloride appear yellow.

== Reactions ==
TaCl_{5} is electrophilic. It forms adducts with a variety of Lewis bases. It serves as a Lewis acid in Friedel-Crafts reactions.

=== Simple adducts ===
TaCl_{5} forms stable complexes with ethers:.

TaCl_{5} + R_{2}O → TaCl_{5}(OR_{2}) (R = Me, Et)

TaCl_{5} also reacts with phosphorus pentachloride and phosphoryl chloride, the former as a chloride donor and the latter serves as a ligand, binding through the oxygen:

TaCl_{5} + PCl_{5} → [PCl_{4}]^{+}[TaCl_{6}]^{−}
TaCl_{5} + OPCl_{3} → [TaCl_{5}(OPCl_{3})]

Tantalum pentachloride reacts with tertiary amines to give adducts:

TaCl_{5} + 2 R_{3}N → [TaCl_{5}(NR_{3})]

=== Chloride displacement reactions ===
Tantalum pentachloride reacts at room temperature with an excess of triphenylphosphine oxide to give oxychlorides:

TaCl_{5} + 3 OPPh_{3} → [TaOCl_{3}(OPPh_{3})]_{x} ...

=== Hydrolysis, alcoholysis, ammonolysis and related reactions ===
Anhydrous TaCl_{5} (Ta_{2}Cl_{10}) rapidly (but not violently) hydrolyses in water at room temperature.

Tantalum pentachloride reacts with sodium ethoxide to give the pentaethoxide, which also exists as a dimer:

5 NaOC_{2}H_{5} + TaCl_{5} → Ta(OC_{2}H_{5})_{5} + NaCl

A variety of related alkoxides and mixed chloro-alkoxides are known, e.g. Ta(OCH_{3})_{5} and Ta(OCH_{2}CH_{3})_{3}Cl_{2}.

Ammonium chloride gives the nitrido complex [TaCl_{5}N]^{3−}.

=== Reduction ===
Reduction of tantalum(V) chloride gives anionic and neutral clusters including [Ta_{6}Cl_{18}]^{4−} and [Ta_{6}Cl_{14}](H_{2}O)_{4}.
