= Niobium(IV) fluoride =

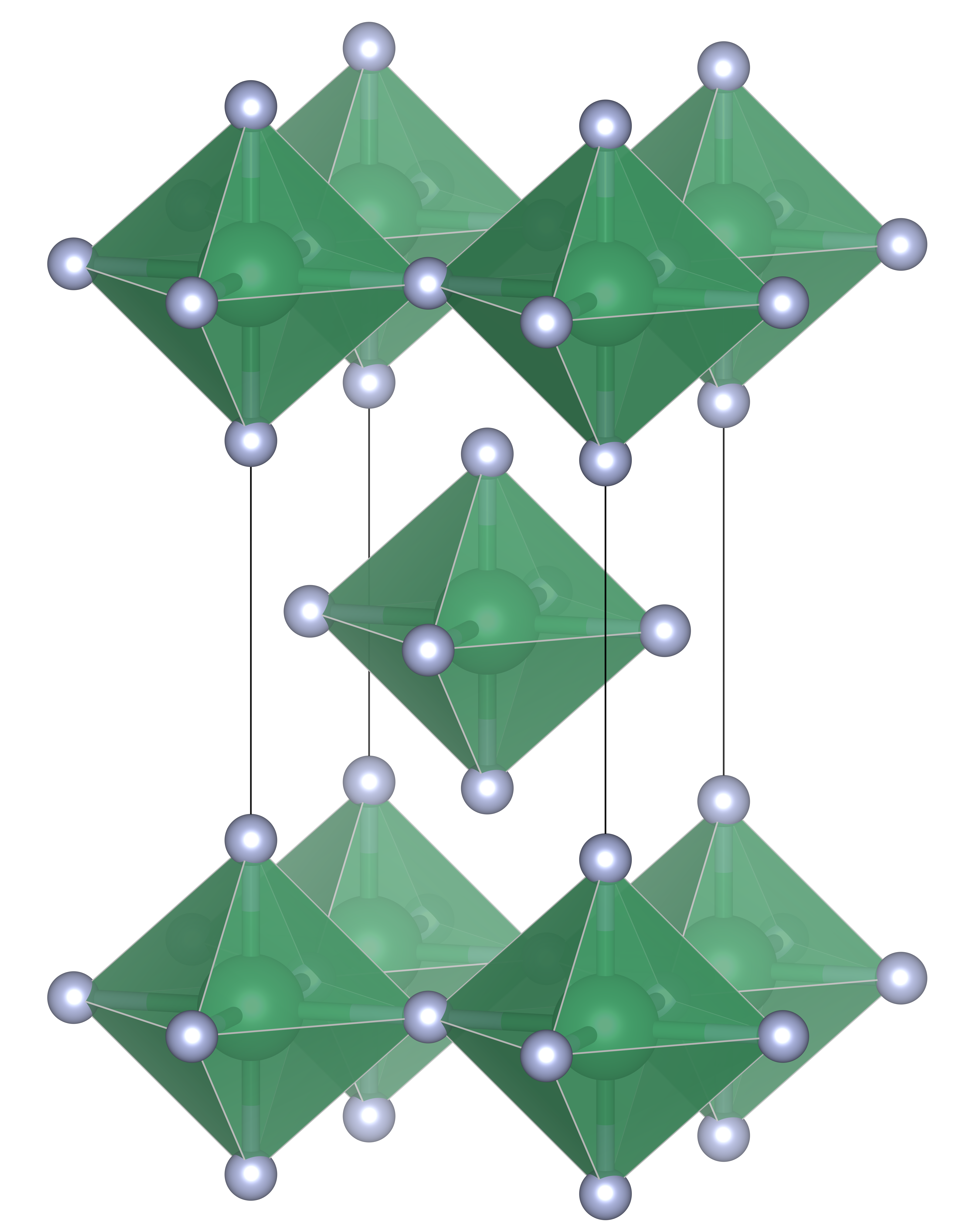
- Unit cell of niobium(IV) fluoride.

Names
- IUPAC name Niobium(IV) fluoride
- Other names: Niobium tetrafluoride

Identifiers
CAS Number	13842-88-1
3D model (JSmol)	Interactive image
ChemSpider	9253762
PubChem CID	11078613
CompTox Dashboard (EPA)	DTXSID901045622
- InChI: InChI=1S/4FH.Nb/h4*1H;/q;;;;+4/p-4 Key: TUDPVASEPFIHNB-UHFFFAOYSA-J
- SMILES: F[Nb](F)(F)F

Properties
Chemical formula	NbF_{4}
Molar mass	168.9 g/mol
Appearance	black solid
Melting point	350 °C (662 °F; 623 K) (decomposes)

Structure
Crystal structure	tetragonal
Point group	I4/mmm
Lattice constant	a = 4,0876(5) Å, c = 8,1351(19) Å
Coordination geometry	[6]Nb
- Except where otherwise noted, data are given for materials in their standard state (at 25 °C [77 °F], 100 kPa). verify (what is ?) Infobox references

Niobium(IV) fluoride is a chemical compound with the formula NbF_{4}. It is a nonvolatile black solid.

== Properties ==
NbF_{4} absorbs vapor strongly and turns into NbO_{2}F in moist air. It reacts with water to form a brown solution and a brown precipitate whose components are unknown. It is stable between 275 °C and 325 °C when heated in a vacuum. However, it disproportionates at 350 °C rapidly to form niobium(V) fluoride and niobium(III) fluoride:

2 NbF_{4} → NbF_{5} + NbF_{3} (at 350 °C)

== Structure ==
Niobium(IV) fluoride adopts a crystal structure analogous to that of tin(IV) fluoride, in which each niobium atom is surrounded by six fluorine atoms forming an octahedron. Of the six fluorine atoms surrounding a single niobium atom, four are bridging to adjacent octahedra, leading to a structure of octahedra connected in layers.
