= Tube furnace =

Electric heating device

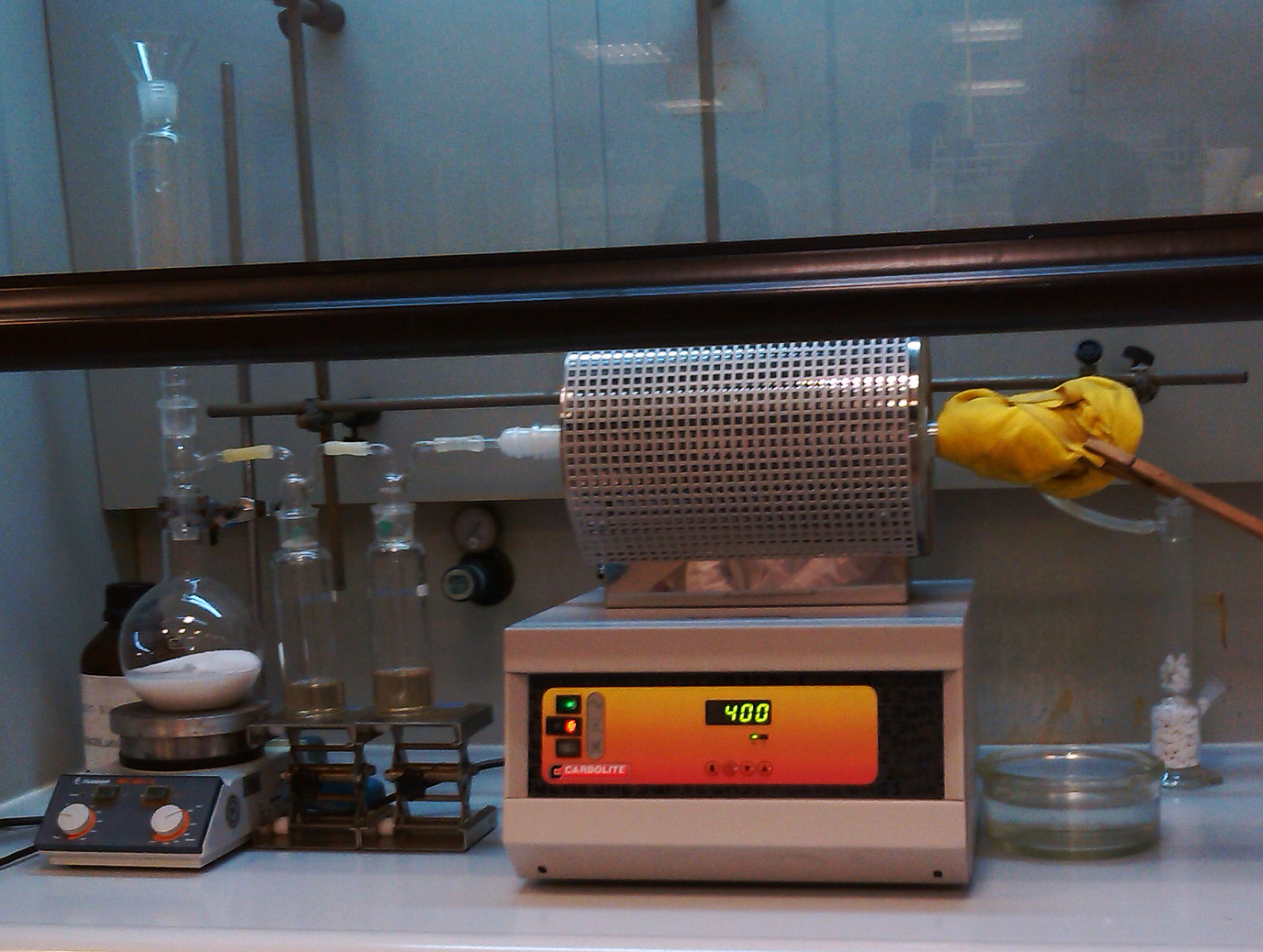
Tube furnace being used during synthesis of aluminium chloride using HCl and aluminium

A tube furnace is an electric heating device used to conduct syntheses and purifications of inorganic compounds and occasionally in organic synthesis. One possible design consists of a cylindrical cavity surrounded by heating coils that are embedded in a thermally insulating matrix. Temperature can be controlled via feedback from a thermocouple. More elaborate tube furnaces have two (or more) heating zones useful for transport experiments. Some digital temperature controllers provide an RS-232 interface, and permit the operator to program segments for uses like ramping, soaking, sintering, and more. Advanced materials in the heating elements, such as molybdenum disilicide (MoSi_{2}) offered in certain models can now produce working temperatures up to 1800 °C. This facilitates more sophisticated applications. Common material for the reaction tubes include alumina, Pyrex, and fused quartz, or in the case of corrosive materials molybdenum or tungsten tubes can be used.

The tube furnace was invented in the first decade of the 20th century and was originally used to manufacture ceramic filaments for Nernst lamps and glowers.

== Controlled -atmosphere operation ==
Tube furnaces are commonly configured for controlled-atmosphere operation, in which the composition of gases surrounding the heated sample is regulated during high-temperature experiments. This configuration allows researchers to control parameters such as oxygen partial pressure (pO₂), total pressure, and gas composition, enabling studies of oxidation, reduction, volatilization, and other high-temperature chemical reactions.

In controlled-atmosphere systems, the furnace tube (typically made from quartz, alumina, or mullite) is sealed at both ends with gas-tight end caps equipped with gas inlet and outlet ports. Process gases are introduced through these ports and flow through the heated region containing the sample. The gas environment may be inert (e.g., argon or nitrogen), oxidizing (e.g., air or oxygen mixtures), or reducing (e.g., hydrogen-containing mixtures), depending on the experimental objective.

Gas composition is commonly regulated using mass flow controllers (MFCs) connected to compressed gas cylinders. By adjusting the relative flow rates of different gases, users can establish specific gas mixtures and control the oxygen partial pressure within the furnace tube. For experiments requiring very low oxygen levels, the furnace tube may first be evacuated using a vacuum pump and then backfilled with inert gas to remove residual air.

Controlled-atmosphere tube furnaces are widely used in materials science, metallurgy, ceramics processing, and semiconductor research. Typical applications include oxidation studies of high-temperature materials, annealing under inert atmospheres, reduction reactions, sintering of ceramics, and chemical vapor deposition experiments.

== Illustrative applications ==
An example of a material prepared using a tube furnace is the superconductor YBa_{2}Cu_{3}O_{7}. A mixture of finely powdered CuO, BaO, and Y_{2}O_{3}, in the appropriate molar ratio, contained in a platinum or alumina "boat," is heated in a tube furnace at several hundred degrees under flowing oxygen. Similarly tantalum disulfide is prepared in a tube furnace followed by purification, also in a tube furnace using the technique of chemical vapor transport. Because of the availability of tube furnaces, chemical vapor transport has become a popular technique not only in industry (see van Arkel–de Boer process) but also in the research laboratory.

Tube furnaces can also be used for thermolysis reactions, involving either organic or inorganic reactants. One such example is the preparation of ketenes which may employ a tube furnace in the 'ketene lamp'. Flash vacuum pyrolysis often utilize a fused quartz tube, usually packed with quartz or ceramic beads, which is heated at high temperatures.
