= Niobium pentaiodide =

Names
- Other names Niobium(V) iodide

Identifiers
CAS Number	13779-92-5
3D model (JSmol)	monomer: Interactive image; dimer: Interactive image
ChemSpider	75550
ECHA InfoCard	100.034.006
EC Number	237-422-1
PubChem CID	83728
UNII	6YYE4L5XPW
CompTox Dashboard (EPA)	DTXSID1065633
- InChI: InChI=1S/5HI.Nb/h5*1H;/q;;;;;+5/p-5 Key: FWIYBTVHGYLSAZ-UHFFFAOYSA-I
- SMILES: monomer: [Nb](I)(I)(I)(I)I; dimer: I[Nb-](I)(I)(I)([I+]1)[I+][Nb-]1(I)(I)(I)I

Properties
Chemical formula	Nb_{2}I_{10}
Molar mass	1475
Appearance	yellow solid
Density	5.30 g/cm^{3}
Melting point	543 °C (1,009 °F; 816 K) sublimes

Hazards
- GHS labelling
Pictograms	(GHS05: Corrosive)
Signal word	Danger
Hazard statements	H314
Precautionary statements	P260, P264, P280, P301+P330+P331, P303+P361+P353, P304+P340, P305+P351+P338, P310, P321, P363, P405, P501

Related compounds
Related compounds	Tantalum pentaiodide
- Except where otherwise noted, data are given for materials in their standard state (at 25 °C [77 °F], 100 kPa). Infobox references

Niobium pentaiodide is the inorganic compound with the formula Nb_{2}I_{10}. Its name comes from the compound's empirical formula, NbI_{5}. It is a diamagnetic, yellow solid that hydrolyses readily. The compound adopts an edge-shared bioctahedral structure, which means that two NbI_{5} units are joined by a pair of iodide bridges. There is no bond between the Nb centres. Niobium(V) chloride, niobium(V) bromide, tantalum(V) chloride, tantalum(V) bromide, and tantalum(V) iodide, all share this structural motif.

== Properties ==
Niobium(V) iodide forms of dark, brassy, extremely moisture-sensitive needles or flakes. Its crystallises in the monoclinic crystal system with space group P2_{1}/c (space group no. 14), a = 1058 pm, b = 658 pm, c = 1388 pm, β = 109.14°. The crystal structure consists of zigzag chains of corner-sharing NbI_{6} octahedra. Since so far only twinned crystals of this phase have been obtained, and the structure determination is uncertain. If the reaction of the elements is carried out with an excess of iodine, a triclinic modification is created with the space group P1 (No. 2), a = 759.1 pm, b = 1032.2 pm, c = 697.7 pm, α = 90 .93°, β = 116.17°, γ = 109.07°, which consists of isolated molecules Nb_{2}I_{10}. This structure is isotypic with that of triclinic niobium(V) bromide.

== Preparation ==
Niobium pentaiodide forms from the reaction of niobium with iodine:

2 Nb + 5 I_{2} → 2 NbI_{5}

The method used for the preparation of tantalum(V) iodide using aluminium triiodide fails to produce pure pentaiodide.
