= Platinum(IV) iodide =

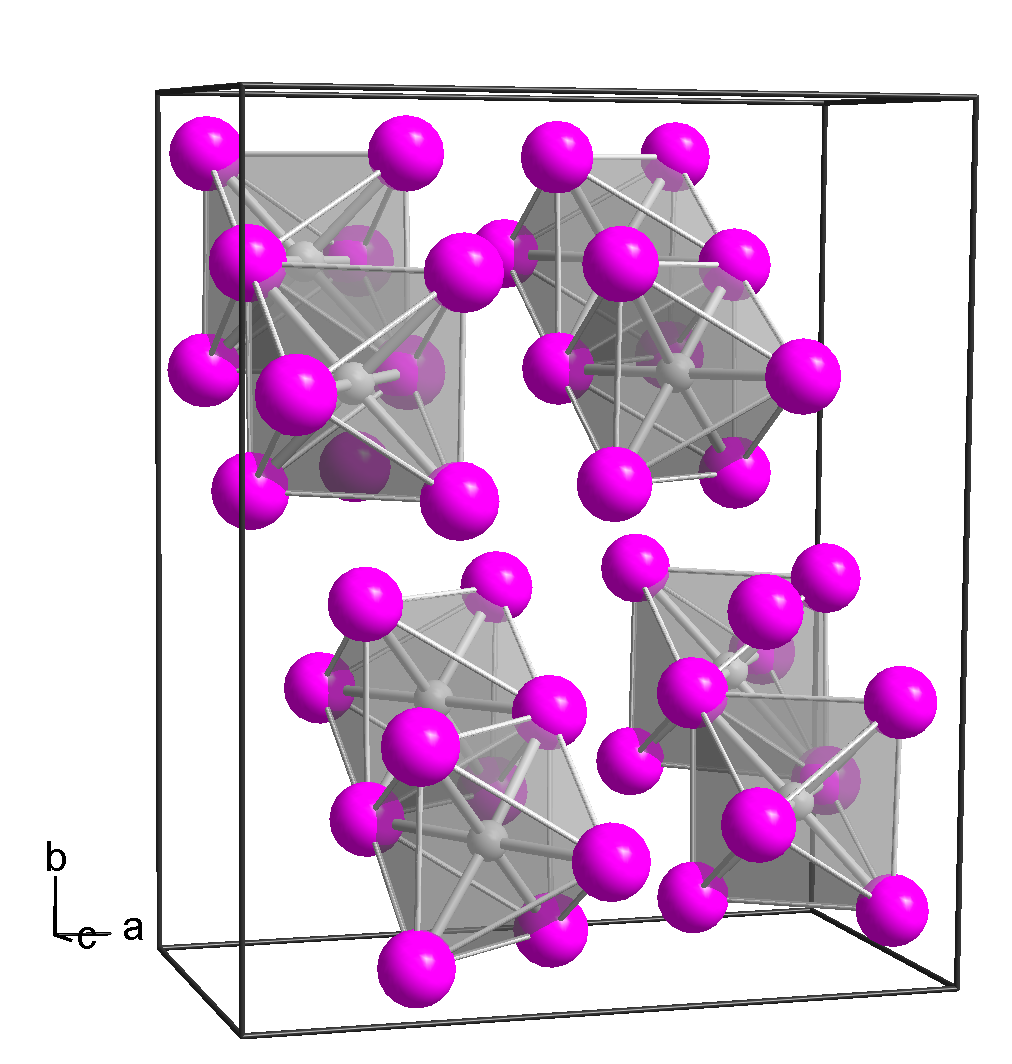

Names
- IUPAC name tetraiodoplatinum
- Other names Platinum tetraiodide, platinic iodide, platinum(4+) tetraiodide

Identifiers
CAS Number	7790-46-7
3D model (JSmol)	Interactive image
ChemSpider	74231
ECHA InfoCard	100.029.280
EC Number	232-207-9
PubChem CID	12978853
UNII	5TC0KR9712
CompTox Dashboard (EPA)	DTXSID30999094
- InChI: InChI=1S/4HI.Pt/h4*1H;/q;;;;+4/p-4 Key: RNJPWBVOCUGBGY-UHFFFAOYSA-J
- SMILES: I[Pt](I)(I)I

Properties
Chemical formula	I_{4}Pt
Molar mass	702.702 g·mol^{−1}
Appearance	brown crystals
Density	6.06 g/cm^{3}
Melting point	130 °C (266 °F; 403 K)
Solubility in water	decomposes
Solubility	soluble in ethanol, acetone, alkali, HI, KI, liquid NH_{3}.

Related compounds
Related compounds	Iridium tetraiodide
- Except where otherwise noted, data are given for materials in their standard state (at 25 °C [77 °F], 100 kPa). Infobox references

Platinum(IV) iodide is an inorganic compound with the formula PtI_{4}. it is a dark brown diamagnetic solid and is one of several binary iodides of platinum.

== Structure ==
Platinum(IV) iodide forms dark brown crystals of several modifications:

- α-PtI_{4}, rhombic crystal system, spatial group P bca, cell parameters a = 1.290 nm, b = 1.564 nm, c = 0.690 nm, Z = 8;
- β-PtI_{4}, cubic crystal system, spatial group P m3m, cell parameters a = 0.56 nm, Z = 1;
- γ-PtI_{4}, tetragonal crystal system, spatial group I 41/a, cell parameters a = 0.677 nm, c = 3.110 nm, Z = 8.

== Preparation ==
Platinum(IV) iodide can be prepared by reacting iodine with platinum:

Pt + 2I_{2} → PtI_{4}

Iodide accelerates this process.

It can also be obtained from the decomposition of hydrogen hexaiodoplatinate(IV) at 80 °C:

H_{2}[PtI_{6}] → PtI_{4} + 2HI

== Chemical properties ==
It decomposes when heated:

PtI_{4} → Pt + 2I_{2}

When dissolved in hydroiodic acid, platinum(IV) iodide forms hydrogen hexaiodoplatinate(IV):

PtI_{4} + 2HI → H_{2}[PtI_{6}]
