= Niobium(III) chloride =

Identifiers
CAS Number	13569-59-0
3D model (JSmol)	Interactive image; 1,2-dimethoxyethane complex: Interactive image
ChemSpider	75410
ECHA InfoCard	100.033.608
EC Number	236-985-0
PubChem CID	11542954; 1,2-dimethoxyethane complex: 6096194
CompTox Dashboard (EPA)	DTXSID3065536
- InChI: InChI=1S/3ClH.Nb/h3*1H;/q;;;+3/p-3 Key: VPDYSPXEGTXWEU-UHFFFAOYSA-K; 1,2-dimethoxyethane complex: InChI=1S/C4H10O2.3ClH.Nb/c1-5-3-4-6-2;;;;/h3-4H2,1-2H3;3*1H;/q;;;;+3/p-3 Key: SBSZUBUHOUKQMN-UHFFFAOYSA-K
- SMILES: [Cl-].[Cl-].[Cl-].[Nb+3]; 1,2-dimethoxyethane complex: COCCOC.Cl[Nb](Cl)Cl

Properties
Chemical formula	Cl_{3}Nb
Molar mass	199.26 g·mol^{−1}
Appearance	black solid
Density	3.75

Structure
Crystal structure	hexagonal
Space group	P3̅m1
Lattice constant	a = 6.744, c = 12.268
Formula units (Z)	2
- Except where otherwise noted, data are given for materials in their standard state (at 25 °C [77 °F], 100 kPa). Infobox references

Niobium(III) chloride also known as niobium trichloride is a compound of niobium and chlorine. The binary phase NbCl_{3} is not well characterized but many adducts are known.

== Structure ==
Nb_{3}Cl_{8} has a hexagonal close packed array of chloride ions. Triangles of niobium occur in octahedral spaces in the chloride array. The compositions with higher chloride have some niobium atoms missing from the structure, creating vacancies and giving rise to nonstoichiometric compounds. NbCl_{4} has this pattern of vacancies stretched until the niobium atoms are in pairs rather than triangles. So NbCl_{3} can be considered as a solid solution of Nb_{3}Cl_{8} and Nb_{2}Cl_{8}.

The colour of niobium trichloride varies depending on the niobium:chloride ratio. NbCl_{2.67} is green, while NbCl_{3.13} is brown.

== Synthesis ==
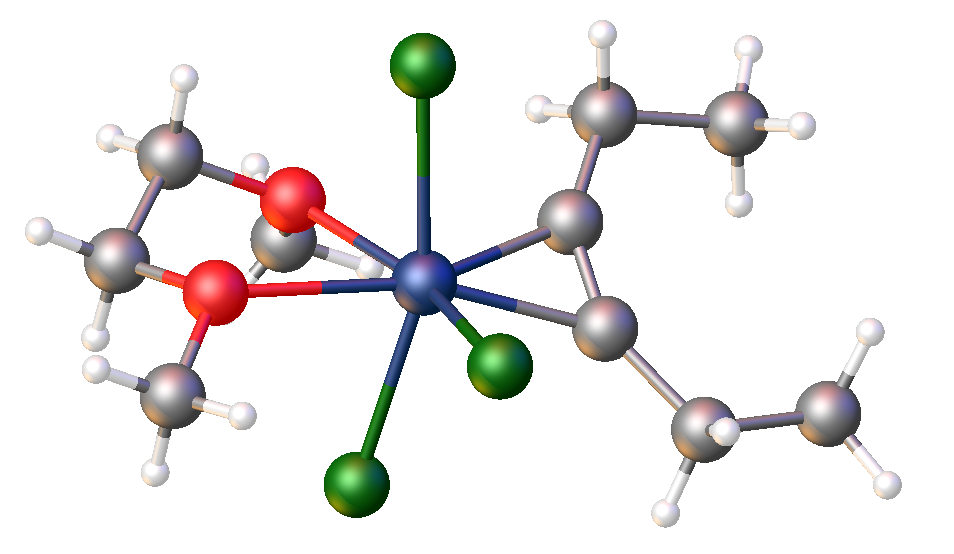
Structure of NbCl_{3}(dimethoxyethane)(3-hexyne).

Nb_{3}Cl_{8} is produced by reduction of niobium(V) chloride with hydrogen, or just by heating.

Salt-free reduction of dimethoxyethane solution of NbCl_{5} with 1,4-disilyl-cyclohexadiene in the presence of 3-hexyne produces the coordination complex NbCl_{3}(dimethoxyethane)(3-hexyne):

NbCl_{5} + C_{6}H_{6}(SiMe_{3})_{2} + C_{2}Et_{2} + dme → NbCl_{3}(dme)(C_{2}Et_{2}) + C_{6}H_{6} + 2 Me_{3}SiCl

An impure dimethoxyethane (dme) adduct of niobium trichloride was produced by reduction of a dme solution of niobium pentachloride with tributyltin hydride:

NbCl_{5} + 2 Bu_{3}SnH + MeOCH_{2}CH_{2}OMe → NbCl_{3}(MeOCH_{2}CH_{2}OMe) + 2 Bu_{3}SnCl

== Reactions ==
Structure of Nb_{2}Cl_{6}(SMe_{2})_{3}.

When heated to over 600 °C niobium trichloride disproportionates to niobium metal and niobium pentachloride.

=== Adducts ===
NbCl_{3}(dimethoxyethane) has received significant attention as a reagent for reductive coupling of carbonyls and imines. It is sold as a 1,2-dimethoxyethane complex. Nb(III) adducts are also known for 1,4-dioxane and diethyl ether.

Niobium(III) chloride forms a series of compounds with the formula Nb_{2}Cl_{6}L_{x} with Nb=Nb double bond. With tertiary phosphines and arsines, the complexes are edge-share bioctahedra, e.g., Nb_{2}Cl_{6}(PPhMe_{2})_{4}. Thioethers form adducts with one bridging thioether (R_{2}S). These face-sharing bioctahedra have the formula Nb_{2}X_{6}(R_{2}S)_{3} (X = Cl, Br).
