= Niobium(V) chloride =

Chemical compound

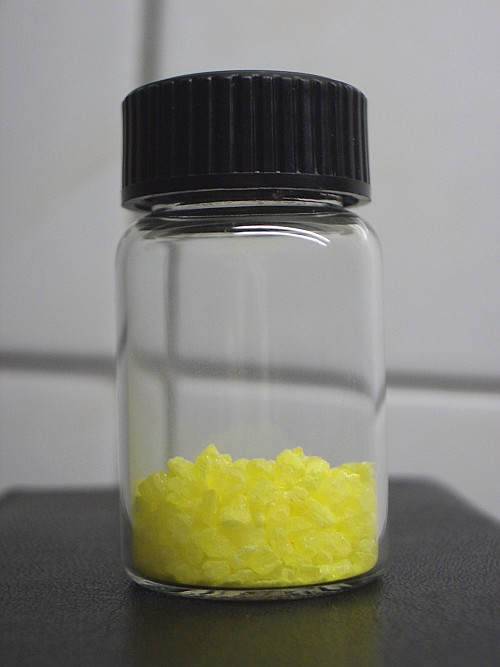
- Sample of niobium(V) chloride

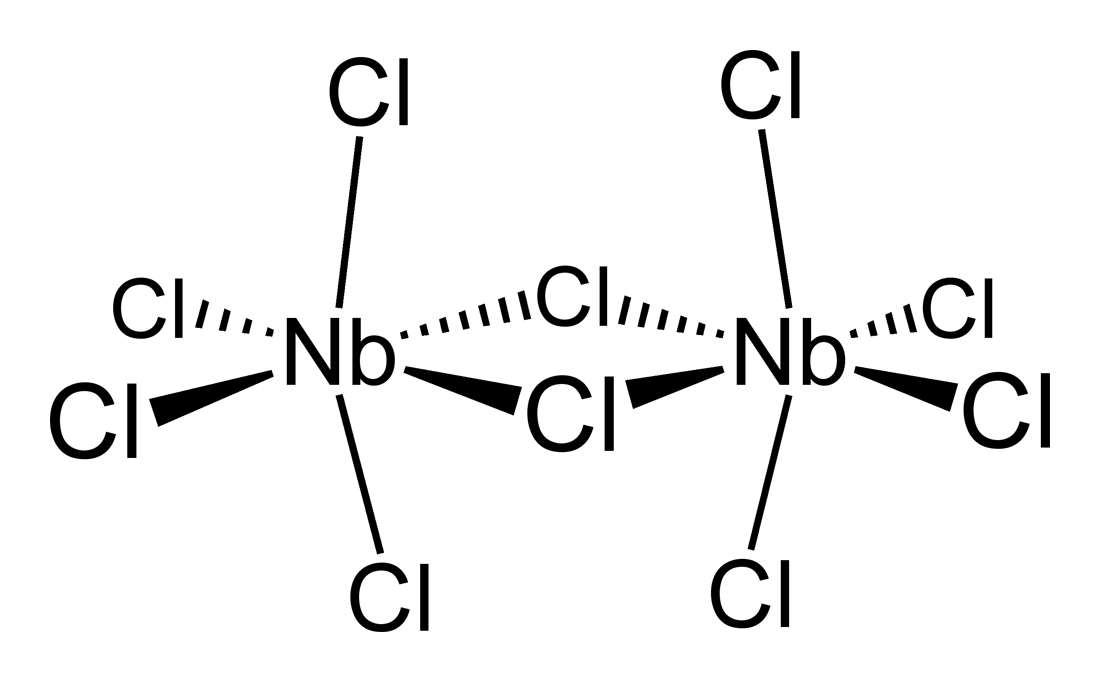

Names
- IUPAC names Niobium(V) chloride Niobium pentachloride

Identifiers
CAS Number	10026-12-7 NbCl_{5}
3D model (JSmol)	Interactive image; dimer: Interactive image
ChemSpider	23203
ECHA InfoCard	100.030.042
EC Number	233-059-8
PubChem CID	24818
RTECS number	QU0350000
UNII	9S1BC7865F
CompTox Dashboard (EPA)	DTXSID7044348
- InChI: InChI=1S/5ClH.Nb/h5*1H;/q;;;;;+5/p-5 Key: YHBDIEWMOMLKOO-UHFFFAOYSA-I
- SMILES: Cl[Nb](Cl)(Cl)(Cl)Cl; dimer: Cl[Nb-]1(Cl)(Cl)(Cl)[Cl+][Nb-]([Cl+]1)(Cl)(Cl)(Cl)Cl

Properties
Chemical formula	NbCl_{5}
Molar mass	270.17 g/mol
Appearance	yellow monoclinic crystals deliquescent
Density	2.75 g/cm^{3}
Melting point	204.7 °C (400.5 °F; 477.8 K)
Boiling point	248.2 °C (478.8 °F; 521.3 K)
Solubility in water	decomposes
Solubility	HCl, chloroform, CCl_{4}

Thermochemistry
Std molar entropy (S^{⦵}_{298})	214.05 J K^{−1} mol^{−1}
Std enthalpy of formation (Δ_{f}H^{⦵}_{298})	−797.47 kJ/mol

Hazards
- GHS labelling
Pictograms	(GHS05: Corrosive) (GHS07: Exclamation mark)
Signal word	Danger
Hazard statements	H302, H312, H314, H332
Precautionary statements	P260, P264, P270, P271, P280, P301+P312, P301+P330+P331, P302+P352, P303+P361+P353, P304+P312, P304+P340, P305+P351+P338, P310, P312, P321, P322, P330, P363, P405, P501
Flash point	Non-flammable

Related compounds
Other anions	Niobium(V) fluoride Niobium(V) bromide Niobium(V) iodide
Other cations	Vanadium(IV) chloride Tantalum(V) chloride
Related niobium chlorides	Niobium(III) chloride Niobium(IV) chloride
- Except where otherwise noted, data are given for materials in their standard state (at 25 °C [77 °F], 100 kPa). verify (what is ?) Infobox references

Niobium(V) chloride, also known as niobium pentachloride, is a yellow crystalline solid. It hydrolyzes in air, and samples are often contaminated with small amounts of NbOCl_{3}. It is often used as a precursor to other compounds of niobium. NbCl_{5} may be purified by sublimation.

== Structure and properties ==
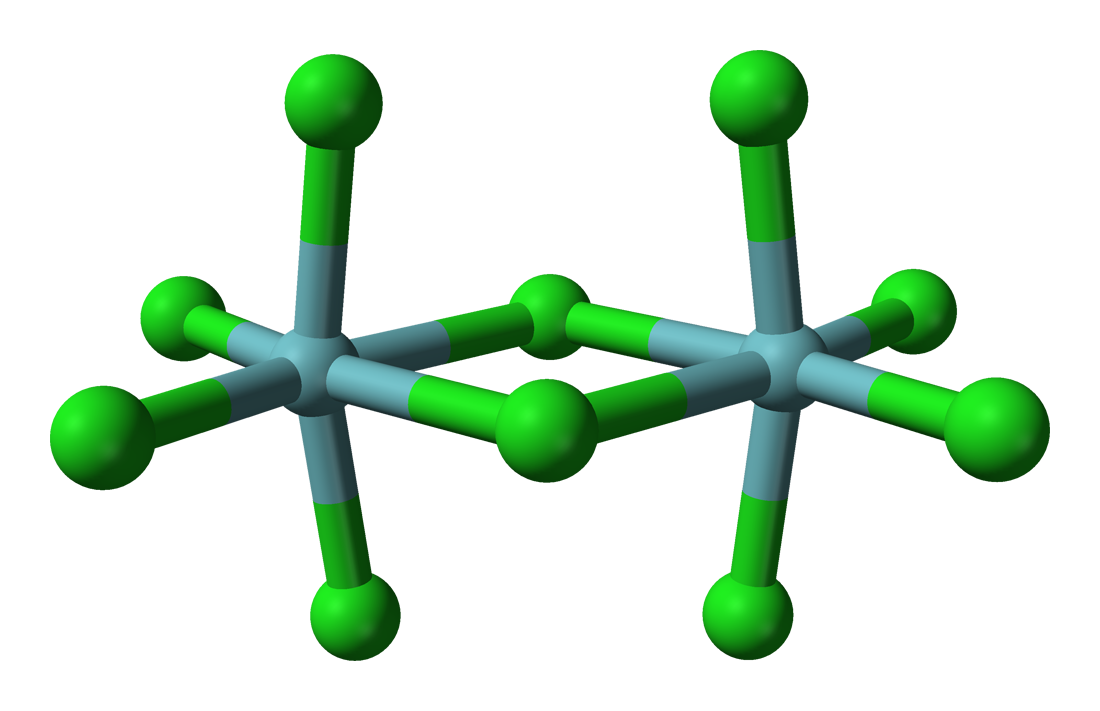
Ball-and-stick model of niobium pentachloride

Niobium(V) chloride forms chloro-bridged dimers in the solid state (see figure). Each niobium centre is six-coordinate, but the octahedral coordination is significantly distorted. The equatorial niobium–chlorine bond lengths are 225 pm (terminal) and 256 pm (bridging), whilst the axial niobium-chlorine bonds are 229.2 pm and are deflected inwards to form an angle of 83.7° with the equatorial plane of the molecule. The Nb–Cl–Nb angle at the bridge is 101.3°. The Nb–Nb distance is 398.8 pm, too long for any metal-metal interaction. NbBr_{5}, NbI_{5}, TaCl_{5} TaBr_{5} and TaI_{5} are isostructural with NbCl_{5}.

== Preparation ==
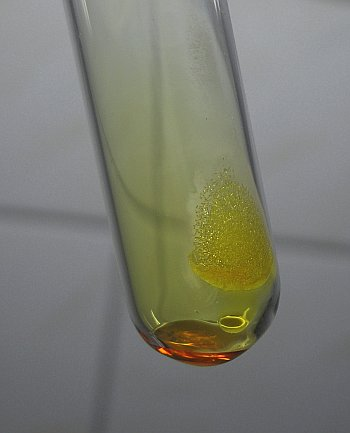
Niobium pentachloride liquid and vapor.

Industrially, niobium pentachloride is obtained by direct chlorination of niobium metal at 300 to 350 °C:

2 Nb + 5 Cl_{2} → 2 NbCl_{5}

In the laboratory, niobium pentachloride is often prepared from Nb_{2}O_{5}, the main challenge being incomplete reaction to give NbOCl_{3}. The conversion can be effected with thionyl chloride: It also can be prepared by chlorination of niobium pentoxide in the presence of carbon at 300 °C.

== Uses ==
Niobium(V) chloride is the main precursor to the alkoxides of niobium, which find uses in sol-gel processing. It is also the precursor to many other Nb-containing reagents, including most organoniobium compounds.

In organic synthesis, NbCl_{5} is a very specialized Lewis acid in activating alkenes for the carbonyl-ene reaction and the Diels-Alder reaction. Niobium chloride can also generate N-acyliminium compounds from certain pyrrolidines which are substrates for nucleophiles such as allyltrimethylsilane, indole, or the silyl enol ether of benzophenone.
