= Bridging ligand =

Ligand which connects two or more (usually metal) atoms in a coordination complex

An example of a μ_{2} bridging ligand, represented with the red letter "L"

In coordination chemistry, a bridging ligand is a ligand that connects two or more atoms, usually metal ions. The ligand may be atomic or polyatomic. Virtually all complex organic compounds can serve as bridging ligands, so the term is usually restricted to small ligands such as pseudohalides or to ligands that are specifically designed to link two metals.

In naming a complex wherein a single atom bridges two metals, the bridging ligand is preceded by the Greek letter mu, μ, with a subscript number denoting the number of metals bound to the bridging ligand. μ_{2} is often denoted simply as μ. When describing coordination complexes care should be taken not to confuse μ with η ('eta'), which relates to hapticity. Ligands that are not bridging are called terminal ligands.

== List of bridging ligands ==
Virtually all ligands are known to bridge, with the exception of amines and ammonia. Common bridging ligands include most of the common anions.

Bridging ligand	Name	Example
OH^{−}	hydroxide	[Fe_{2}(OH)_{2}(H_{2}O)_{8}]^{4+}, see olation
O^{2−}	oxide	[Cr_{2}O_{7}]^{2−}, see polyoxometalate
SH^{−}	hydrosulfido	Cp_{2}Mo_{2}(SH)_{2}S_{2}
NH^{−}_{2}	amido	HgNH_{2}Cl
N^{3−}	nitride	[Ir_{3}N(SO_{4})_{6}(H_{2}O)_{3}]^{4−}, see metal nitrido complex
CO	carbonyl	Fe_{2}(CO)_{9}, see bridging carbonyl
Cl^{−}	chloride	Nb_{2}Cl_{10}, see halide ligands
H^{−}	hydride	B_{2}H_{6}
CN^{−}	cyanide	approx. Fe_{7}(CN)_{18} (prussian blue), see cyanometalate
PPh^{−}_{2}	diphenylphosphide	see transition metal phosphido complexes

Many simple organic ligands form strong bridges between metal centers. Many common examples include organic derivatives of the above inorganic ligands (R = alkyl, aryl): OR^{−}, SR^{−}, NR^{−}_{2}, NR^{2−} (imido), PR^{−}_{2} (phosphido, note the ambiguity with the preceding entry), PR^{2−} (phosphinidino), and many more.

== Examples ==
Compounds and complexes with bridging ligands

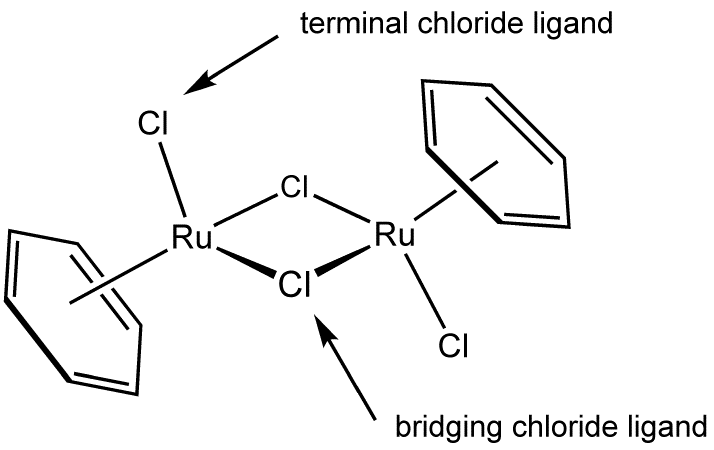
In this ruthenium complex ((benzene)ruthenium dichloride dimer), two chloride ligands are terminal and two are μ_{2} bridging.

Pyrazine is a bridging ligand in this diruthenium compound, called the Creutz–Taube complex.

In the cobalt cluster Co_{3}(CO)_{9}(C^{t}Bu), the C^{t}Bu ligand is triply bridging, although this aspect is typically not indicated in the formula.

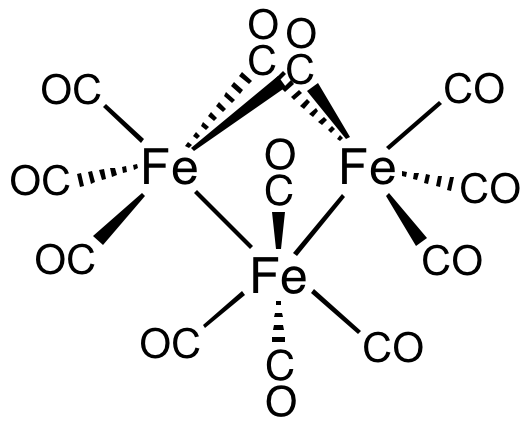
In triiron dodecacarbonyl, two CO ligands are bridging and ten are terminal ligands. The terminal and bridging CO ligands interchange rapidly.

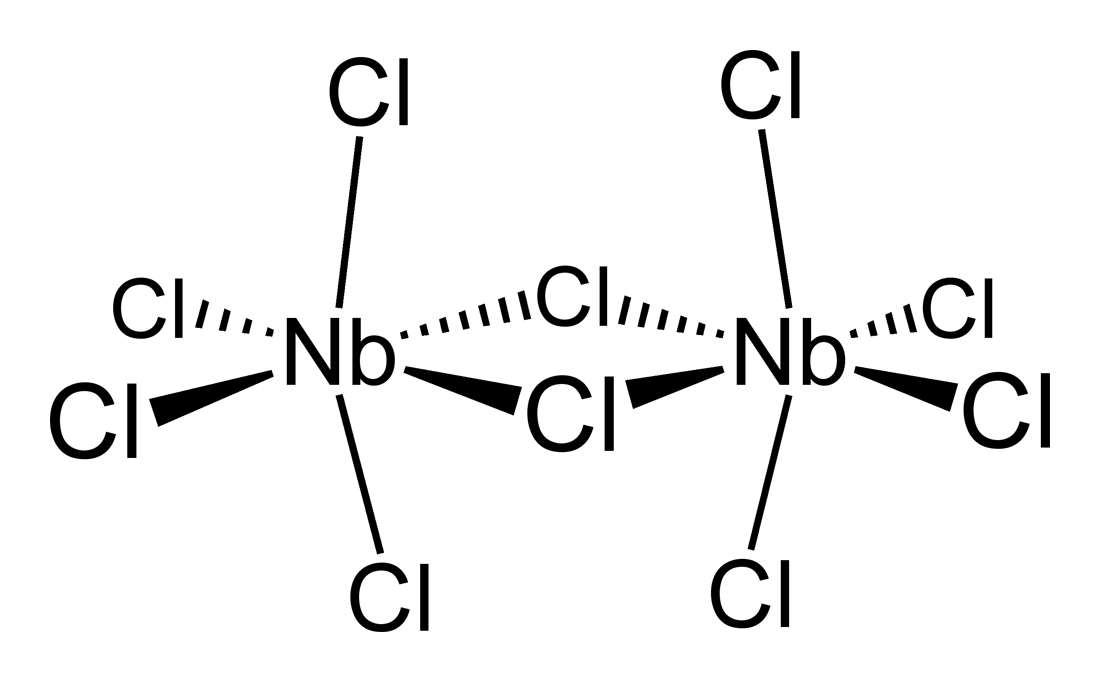
In NbCl_{5}, there are two bridging and eight terminal chloride ligands.

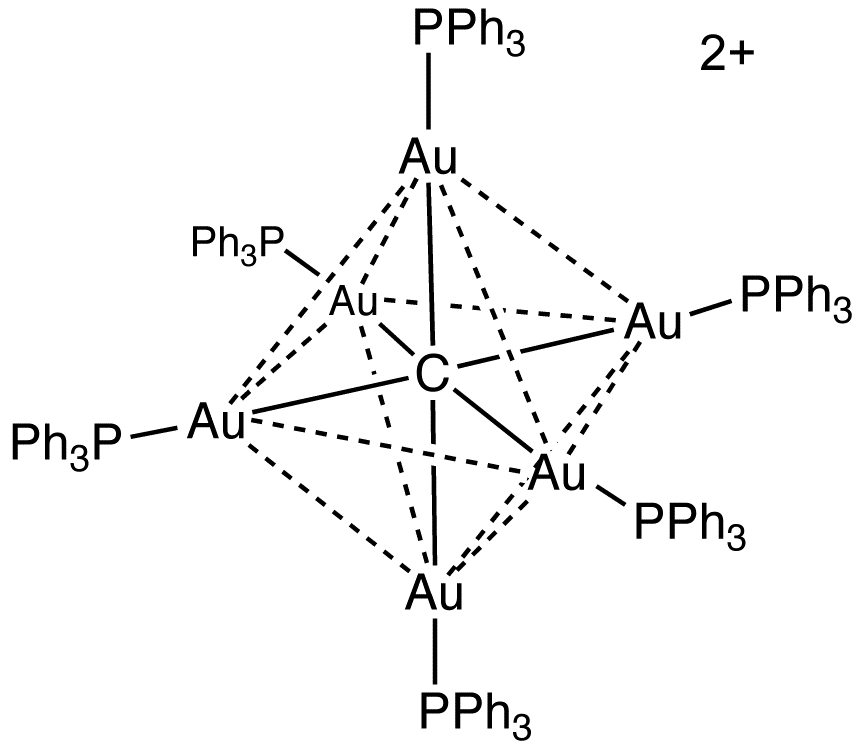
The cluster [Au_{6}C(PPh_{3})_{6}]^{2+} features a μ_{6}-carbide ligand, although again, the designator "μ" is not usually used.

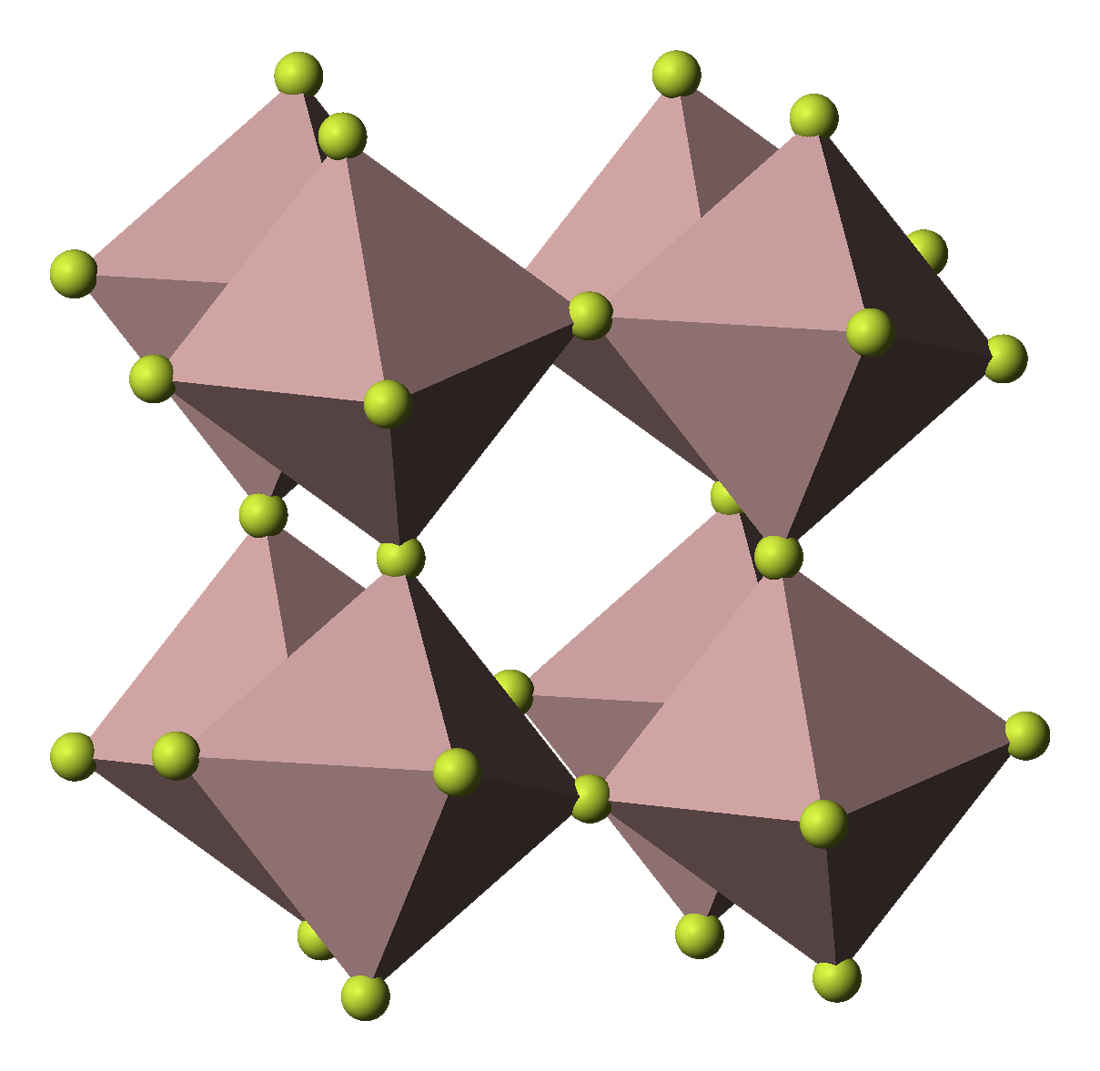
In rhenium trioxide, the oxide ligands are all μ_{2}. These oxide ligands "glue" together the metal centres.

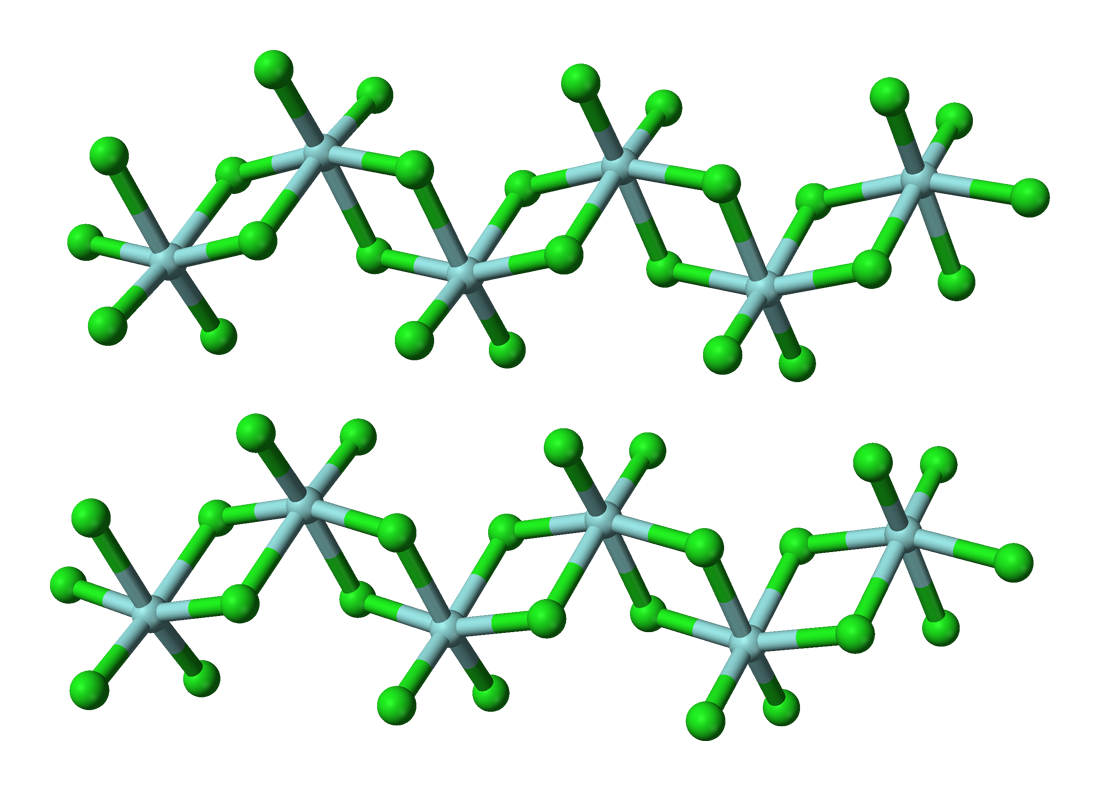
In the case of ZrCl_{4}, there are both terminal and doubly bridging chloride ligands.

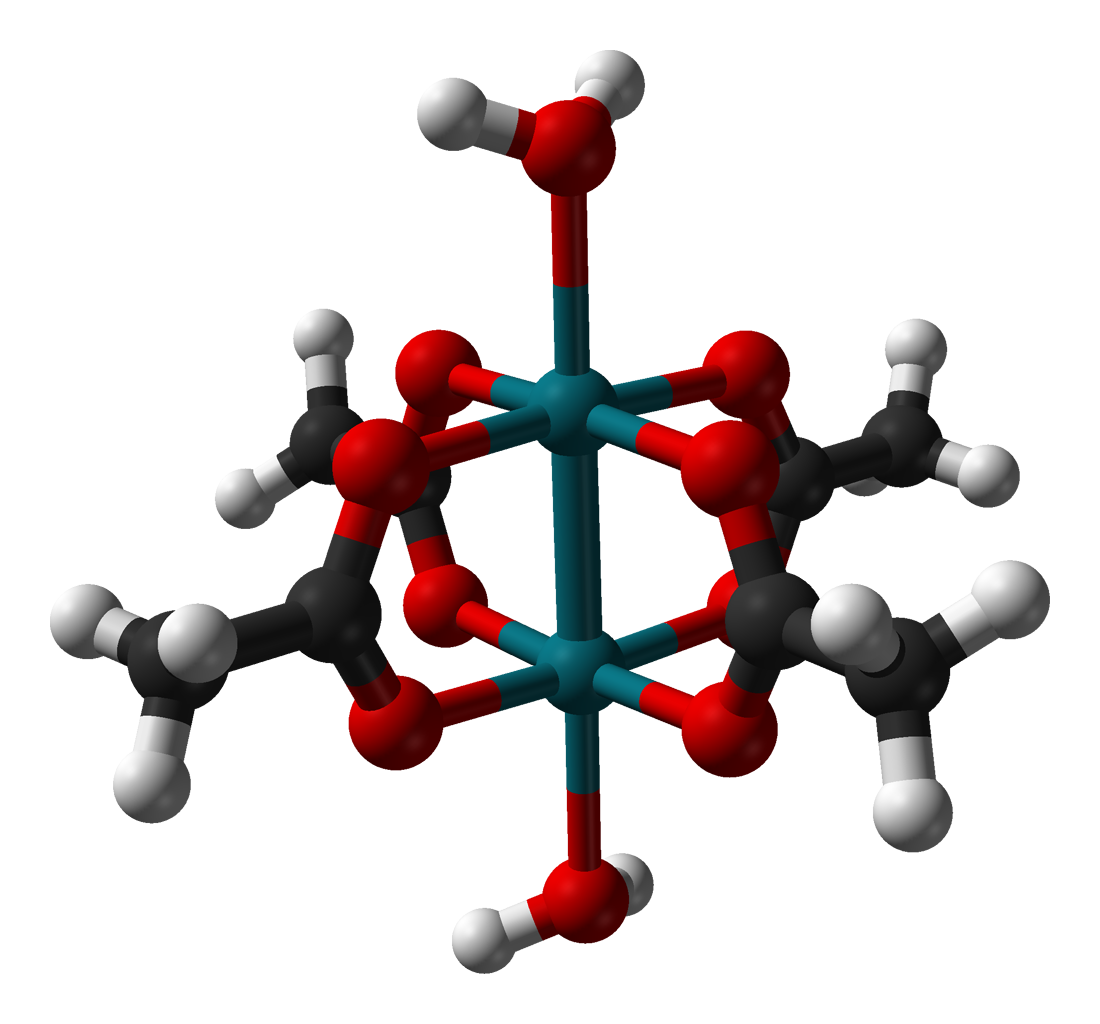
In rhodium(II) acetate, the four acetate groups are bridging ligands.

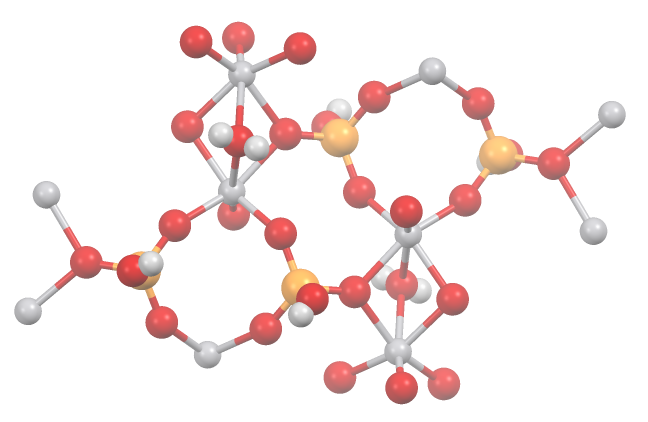
In VO(HPO_{4})·0.5H_{2}O, pairs of vanadium(IV) centers are bridged by water ligands.

== Bonding ==
For doubly bridging (μ_{2}-) ligands, two limiting representation are 4-electron and 2-electron bonding interactions. These cases are illustrated in main group chemistry by [Me_{2}Al(μ_{2}-Cl)]_{2} and [Me_{2}Al(μ_{2}-Me)]_{2}. Complicating this analysis is the possibility of metal–metal bonding. Computational studies suggest that metal-metal bonding is absent in many compounds where the metals are separated by bridging ligands. For example, calculations suggest that Fe_{2}(CO)_{9} lacks an iron–iron bond by virtue of a 3-center 2-electron bond involving one of three bridging CO ligands.

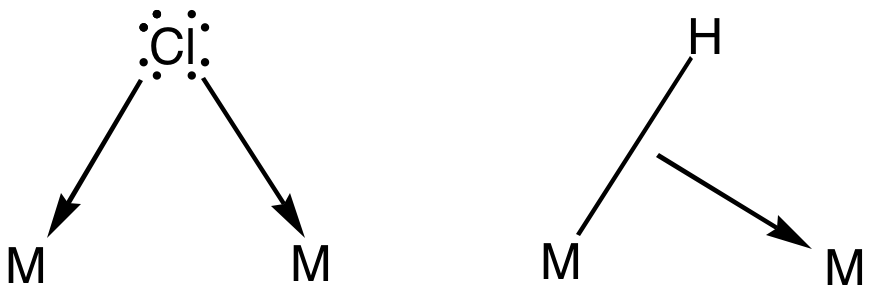
Representations of two kinds of μ-bridging ligand interactions, 3-center, 4-electron bond (left) and 3-center, 2-electron bonding.

== Bridge-terminal exchange ==
The interchange of bridging and terminal ligands is called bridge-terminal exchange. The process is invoked to explain the fluxional properties of metal carbonyl and metal isocyanide complexes. Some complexes that exhibit this process are cobalt carbonyl and cyclopentadienyliron dicarbonyl dimer:

Co_{2}(μ-CO)_{2}(CO)_{6} ⇌ Co_{2}(μ-CO)_{2}(CO)_{4}(CO)_{2}
(C_{5}H_{5})_{2}Fe_{2}(μ-CO)_{2}(CO)_{2} ⇌ (C_{5}H_{5})_{2}Fe_{2}(μ-CO)_{2}(CO)_{2}

These dynamic processes, which are degenerate, proceed via an intermediate where the CO ligands are all terminal, i.e., (CO)_{4}Co−Co(CO)_{4} and (C_{5}H_{5})(CO)_{2}Fe−Fe(CO)_{2}C_{5}H_{5}.

Bridge-terminal exchange is common for metal complexes of borohydride where the M-H-B and B-H_{terminal} sites interchange with low barriers.

== Polyfunctional ligands ==
Polyfunctional ligands can attach to metals in many ways and thus can bridge metals in diverse ways, including sharing of one atom or using several atoms. Examples of such polyatomic ligands are the oxoanions CO^{2−}_{3} and the related carboxylates, PO^{3−}_{4}, and the polyoxometalates. Several organophosphorus ligands have been developed that bridge pairs of metals, a well-known example being Ph_{2}PCH_{2}PPh_{2}.

== See also ==
- Bridging carbonyl
