= List of CAS numbers by chemical compound =

This is a list of CAS numbers by chemical formulas and chemical compounds, indexed by formula.The CAS number is a unique number applied to a specific chemical by the Chemical Abstracts Service (CAS). This list complements alternative listings to be found at list of inorganic compounds and glossary of chemical formulae.

== A ==
Chemical formula	Synonyms	CAS number
Ac_{2}O_{3}	actinium(III) oxide	12002–61–8
Ag	silver	7440-22-4
AgAlCl_{4}	silver tetrachloroaluminate	27039–77–6
AgBr	silver bromide	7785–23–1
AgBrO_{3}	silver bromate	7783–89–3
AgCN	silver cyanide	506–64–9
AgC_{2}H_{3}O_{2}	silver acetate	563–63–3
AgCl	silver chloride	7783–90–6
AgClO_{3}	silver chlorate	7783–92–8
AgClO_{4}	silver perchlorate	7783–93–9
AgF	silver fluoride	7775–41–9
AgF_{2}	silver difluoride	7783–95–1
AgI	silver iodide	7783–96–2
AgIO_{3}	silver iodate	7783–97–3
AgMnO_{4}	silver permanganate	7783–98–4
AgN_{3}	silver azide	13863–88–2
AgNO_{3}	silver nitrate	7761–88–8
AgO	silver(I,III) oxide	1301–96–8
AgONC	silver fulminate	5610–59–3
AgPF_{6}	silver hexafluorophosphate	26042–63–7
AgReO_{4}	silver perrhenate	7784–00–1
AgSNC	silver thiocyanate	1701–93–5
Ag_{2}C_{2}	silver acetylide	7659–31–6
Ag_{2}CO_{3}	silver carbonate	534–16–7
Ag_{2}C_{2}O_{4}	silver oxalate	533–51–7
Ag_{2}Cl_{2}	disilver dichloride	75763–82–5
Ag_{2}CrO_{4}	silver chromate	7784–01–2
Ag_{2}Cr_{2}O_{7}	silver dichromate	7784–02–3
Ag_{2}F	silver subfluoride	1302–01–8
Ag_{2}MoO_{4}	silver molybdate	13765–74–7
Ag_{2}O	silver oxide	20667–12–3
Ag_{2}S	silver sulfide	21548–73–2
Ag_{2}SO_{4}	silver sulfate	10294–26–5
Ag_{2}Se	silver selenide	1302–09–6
Ag_{2}SeO_{3}	silver selenite	7784–05–6
Ag_{2}SeO_{4}	silver selenate	7784–07–8
Ag_{2}Te	silver telluride	12002–99–2
Ag_{3}Br_{2}	silver dibromide	11078–32–3
Ag_{3}Br_{3}	silver tribromide	11078–33–4
Ag_{3}Cl_{3}	trisilver trichloride	12444–96–1
Ag_{3}I_{3}	trisilver triiodide	37375–12–5
Ag_{3}PO_{4}	silver phosphate	7784–09–0
Ag_{3}SbS_{3}	silver thioantimonate	15983–65–0
Al	aluminium	7429–90–5
AlAs	aluminium arsenide	22831–42–1
AlB_{2}	aluminium diboride	12041–50–8
AlB_{12}	aluminium dodecaboride	12041–54–2
AlBr_{3}	aluminium bromide	7727–15–3
AlBr_{3}•6H_{2}O	aluminium bromide hexahydrate	7784–11–4
Al(CHO_{2})_{3}	aluminium formate	7360–53–4
AlCl_{3}	aluminium chloride	7446–70–0
AlCl_{3}•6H_{2}O	aluminium chloride hexahydrate	7784–13–6
AlF_{3}	aluminium fluoride	7784–18–1
AlI_{3}	aluminium iodide	7784–23–8
AlN	aluminium nitride	24304–00–5
Al(NO_{3})_{3}	aluminium nitrate	13473–90–0
Al(OH)_{3}	aluminium hydroxide	21645–51–2
AlP	aluminium phosphide	20859–73–8
AlPO_{4}	aluminium phosphate	7784–30–7
AlSb	aluminium antimonide	25152–52–7
Al_{2}O_{3}	aluminium oxide	1344–28–1
Al_{2}(SO_{4})_{3}	aluminium sulfate	10043–01–3
Al_{2}S_{3}	aluminium sulfide	1302–81–4
Al_{2}Se_{3}	aluminium selenide	1302–82–5
Al_{4}C_{3}	aluminum carbide	1299–86–1
Al_{6}O_{13}Si_{2}	aluminum silicate	1302–93–8
AmCl_{3}	americium(III) chloride	13464–46–5
AmO_{2}	americium dioxide	12005–67–3
As	arsenic	7440–38–2
AsBrO	arsenic oxybromide	82868–10–8
AsBr_{3}	arsenic tribromide	7784–33–0
AsCl_{3}	arsenic trichloride	7784–34–1
AsCl_{3}O	arsenic oxychloride	60646–36–8
AsCl_{5}	arsenic pentachloride	22441–45–8
AsF_{3}	arsenic trifluoride	7784–35–2
AsF_{5}	arsenic pentafluoride	7784–36–3
AsH_{3}	arsenic trihydride	7784–42–1
AsI_{3}	arsenic triiodide	7784–45–4
AsO	arsenic monoxide	12005–99–1
AsO_{2}	arsenic dioxide	12255–12–8
AsP	arsenic monophosphide	12255–33–3
AsP_{3}	arsenic phosphide	12511–95–4
AsSe_{4}	arsenic tetraselenide	12006–06–3
As_{2}H_{4}	diarsenic tetrahydride	15942–63–9
As_{2}I_{4}	arsenic diiodide	13770–56–4
As_{2}O_{3}	arsenic trioxide	1327–53–3
As_{2}O_{5}	arsenic pentoxide	1303–28–2
As_{2}P_{2}	arsenic diphosphide	12512–03–7
As_{2}S_{3}	arsenic trisulfide	1303–33–9
As_{2}S_{4}	arsenic tetrasulfide	1303–32–8
As_{2}S_{5}	arsenic pentasulfide	1303–34–0
As_{2}Se	arsenic hemiselenide	1303–35–1
As_{2}Se_{3}	arsenic triselenide	1303–36–2
As_{2}Se_{5}	arsenic pentaselenide	1303–37–3
As_{2}Te_{3}	arsenic tritelluride	12044–54–1
As_{3}O_{4}	arsenic tetraoxide	83527–53–1
As_{3}P	arsenic triphosphide	12512–11–7
As_{4}S_{4}	tetraarsenic tetrasulfide	12279–90–2
Au	gold	7440–57–5
AuBr	gold(I) bromide	10294–27–6
AuBr_{3}	gold(III) bromide	10294–28–7
AuCN	gold(I) cyanide	506–65–0
AuCl	gold(I) chloride	10294–29–8
AuCl_{3}	gold(III) chloride	13453–07–1
AuF_{3}	gold(III) fluoride	14720–21–9
AuF_{5}	gold(V) fluoride	57542–85–5
AuI	gold(I) iodide	10294–31–2
AuI_{3}	gold(III) iodide	31032–13–0
Au(OH)_{3}	gold(III) hydroxide	1303–52–2
AuSe	gold(II) selenide	23331–11–5
AuTe	gold(II) telluride	37043–71–3
Au_{2}O_{3}	gold(III) oxide	1303–58–8
Au_{2}S	gold(I) sulfide	1303–60–2
Au_{2}S_{3}	gold(III) sulfide	1303–61–3
Au_{2}(SeO_{4})_{3}	gold(III) selenate	10294–32–3
Au_{2}Se_{3}	gold(III) selenide	1303–62–4
Au_{4}Cl_{8}	gold(I,III) chloride	62792–24–9
Au_{4}F_{8}	gold(I,III) fluoride	14270–21–4

== B ==
Chemical formula	Synonyms	CAS number
BAs	boron arsenide	12005–69–5
BAsO_{4}	boron arsenate	13510–31–1
BBr_{3}	boron tribromide	10294–33–4
BCl_{3}	boron trichloride	10294–34–5
BF_{3}	boron trifluoride	7637–07–2
BI_{3}	boron triiodide	13517–10–7
BN	boron nitride	10043–11–5
BP	boron phosphide	20205–91–8
BPO_{4}	boron phosphate	13308–51–5
B_{2}Cl_{4}	diboron tetrachloride	13701–67–2
B_{2}F_{4}	diboron tetrafluoride	13965–73–6
B_{2}H_{6}	diboron hexahydride	19287–45–7
B_{2}O_{3}	diboron trioxide	1303–86–2
B_{2}S_{3}	diboron trisulfide	12007–33–9
B_{4}C	boron carbide	12069–32–8
B_{4}H_{10}	boron decahydride	18283–93–7
BaAl_{2}O_{4}	barium aluminate	12004–04–5
Ba(AsO_{3})_{2}	barium arsenite	125687–68–5
Ba(AsO_{4})_{2}	barium arsenate	56997–31–0
BaB_{6}	barium boride	12046–08–1
BaBr_{2}	barium bromide	10553–31–8
BaBr_{2}•2H_{2}O	barium bromide dihydrate	7791–28–8
Ba(CHO_{2})_{2}	barium formate	541–43–5
Ba(CN)_{2}	barium cyanide	542–62–1
BaCO_{3}	barium carbonate	513–77–9
BaC_{2}	barium carbide	50813–65–5
Ba(C_{2}H_{3}O_{2})_{2}	barium acetate	543–80–6
BaC_{2}O_{4}	barium oxalate	516–02–9
BaC_{4}H_{4}O_{6}	barium tartrate	5908–81–6
Ba(C_{18}H_{35}O_{2})_{2}	barium stearate	6865–35–6
Ba(ClO_{3})_{2}	barium chlorate	13477–00–4
Ba(ClO_{4})_{2}	barium perchlorate	13465–95–7
BaCl_{2}	barium chloride	10361–37–2
BaCl_{2}•2H_{2}O	barium chloride dihydrate	10326–27–9
BaCrO_{4}	barium chromate	10294–40–3
BaF_{2}	barium fluoride	7787–32–8
Ba(HS)_{2}	barium hydrosulfide	25417–81–6
BaH_{2}	barium hydride	13477–09–3
BaHgI_{4}	barium tetraiodomercurate	10048–99–4
BaI_{2}	barium iodide	13718–50–8
BaI_{2}•2H_{2}O	barium iodide dihydrate	7787–33–9
BaMnO_{4}	barium manganate	7787–35–1
Ba(MnO_{4})_{2}	barium permanganate	7787–36–2
BaMoO_{4}	barium molybdate	7787–37–3
Ba(NO_{2})_{2}	barium nitrite	13465–94–6
Ba(NO_{3})_{2}	barium nitrate	10022–31–8
BaN_{6}	barium azide	18810–58–7
Ba(NbO_{3})_{2}	barium niobate	12009–14–2
BaO	barium oxide	1304–28–5
Ba(OH)_{2}	barium hydroxide	17194–00–2
BaO_{2}	barium peroxide	1304–29–6
Ba(PO_{3})_{2}	barium metaphosphate	13466–20–1
Ba(ReO_{4})_{2}	barium perrhenate	13768–52–0
BaS	barium sulfide	21109–95–5
Ba(SCN)_{2}	barium thiocyanate	2092–17–3
BaSO_{3}	barium sulfite	7787–39–5
BaSO_{4}	barium sulfate	7727–43–7
BaS_{2}O_{3}	barium thiosulfate	35112–53–9
BaSe	barium selenide	1304–39–8
BaSeO_{3}	barium selenite	13718–59–7
BaSeO_{4}	barium selenate	7787–41–9
BaSiF_{6}	barium hexafluorosilicate	17125–80–3
BaSiO_{3}	barium metasilicate	13255–26–0
BaSi_{2}	barium silicide	1304–40–1
BaSi_{2}O_{5}	barium disilicate	12650–28–1
BaSnO_{3}	barium stannate	12009–18–6
BaTiO_{3}	barium titanate	12047–27–7
Ba(VO_{3})_{2}	barium vanadate	22652–39–7
BaWO_{4}	barium tungstate	7787–42–0
BaZrO_{3}	barium zirconate	12009–21–1
Ba_{2}P_{2}O_{7}	barium pyrophosphate	13466–21–2
Ba_{3}(CrO_{4})_{2}	barium dichromate	12345–14–1
Ba_{3}N_{2}	barium nitride	12047–79–9
Ba_{3}(VO_{4})_{2}	barium orthovanadate	39416–30–3
BeAl_{2}O_{4}	beryllium aluminate	120041–06–7
Be(BH_{4})_{2}	beryllium borohydride	17440–85–6
BeB_{2}	beryllium boride	12228–40–9
BeBr_{2}	beryllium bromide	7787–46–4
Be(CHO_{2})_{2}	beryllium formate	1111–71–3
Be(C_{2}H_{3}O_{2})_{2}	beryllium acetate	543–81–7
Be(C_{5}H_{7}O_{2})_{2}	beryllium acetylacetonate	10210–64–7
BeCl_{2}	beryllium chloride	7787–47–5
BeF_{2}	beryllium fluoride	7787–49–7
BeH_{2}	beryllium hydride	7787–52–2
BeI_{2}	beryllium iodide	7787–53–3
Be(NO_{3})_{2}	beryllium nitrate	13597–99–4
Be(NO_{3})_{2}•4H_{2}O	beryllium nitrate tetrahydrate	13510–48–0
Be(NO_{3})_{2}•3H_{2}O	beryllium nitrate trihydrate	7787–55–5
BeO	beryllium oxide	1304–56–9
Be(OH)_{2}	beryllium hydroxide	13327–32–7
BeS	beryllium sulfide	13598–22–6
BeSO_{4}	beryllium sulfate	13510–49–1
BeSO_{4}•4H_{2}O	beryllium sulfate trihydrate	7787–56–6
BeSe	beryllium selenide	12232–25–6
BeTe	beryllium telluride	12232–27–8
Be_{2}C	beryllium carbide	506–66–1
Be_{2}SiO_{4}	beryllium silicate	13598–00–0
Be_{3}N_{2}	beryllium nitride	1304–54–7
Be_{3}(PO_{4})_{2}	beryllium phosphate	13598–15–7
BiBr_{3}	bismuth(III) bromide	7787–58–8
Bi(CHO_{2})_{3}	bismuth(III) formate	25573–24–4
BiC_{6}H_{5}O_{7}	bismuth(III) citrate	813–93–4
BiCl_{3}	bismuth(III) chloride	7787–60–2
BiF_{3}	bismuth(III) fluoride	7787–61–3
BiF_{5}	bismuth(V) fluoride	7787–62–4
BiH_{3}	bismuth(III) hydride	18288–22–7
BiI_{3}	bismuth(III) iodide	7787–64–6
BiNbO_{4}	bismuth(III) orthoniobate	12272–28–5
BiOBr	bismuth(III) oxybromide	7787–57–7
BiOCl	bismuth(III) oxychloride	7787–59–9
Bi(OH)_{3}	bismuth(III) hydroxide	10361–43–0
BiOI	bismuth(III) oxyiodide	7787–63–5
BiONO_{3}	bismuth(III) oxynitrate	10361–46–3
(BiO)_{2}CO_{3}	bismuth(III) subcarbonate	5892–10–4
BiPO_{4}	bismuth(III) phosphate	10049–01–1
BiTaO_{4}	bismuth(III) orthotantalate	12272–29–6
BiVO_{4}	bismuth(III) vanadate	14059–33–7
Bi_{2}(C_{2}O_{4})_{3}	bismuth(III) oxalate	6591–55–5
Bi_{2}(MoO_{4})_{3}	bismuth(III) molybdate	51898–99–8
Bi_{2}O_{3}	bismuth(III) oxide	1304–76–3
Bi_{2}O_{4}	bismuth(IV) peroxide	12048–50–9
Bi_{2}S_{3}	bismuth(III) sulfide	1345–07–9
Bi_{2}Se_{3}	bismuth(III) selenide	12068–69–8
Bi_{2}(SnO_{4})_{3}	bismuth(III) stannate	7787–68–0
Bi_{2}Te_{3}	bismuth(III) telluride	1304–82–1
Bi_{4}(TiO_{4})_{3}	bismuth(III) titanate	12048–51–0
Bi_{5}O(OH)_{9}(NO_{3})_{4}	bismuth(III) subnitrate	1304–85–4
BkBr_{3}	berkelium(III) bromide	22787–71–9
BkCl_{3}	berkelium(III) chloride	13536–46–4
BkF_{3}	berkelium(III) fluoride	20716–88–5
BkF_{4}	berkelium(IV) fluoride	22422–27–1
BkI_{3}	berkelium(III) iodide	23171–53–1
BkO	berkelium(II) oxide	70424–36–1
BkO_{2}	berkelium(IV) oxide	12010–84–3
Bk_{2}O_{3}	berkelium(III) oxide	12310–58–6
BrCl	bromine monochloride	13863–41–7
BrF	bromine monofluoride	13863–59–7
BrF_{3}	bromine trifluoride	7787–71–5
BrF_{5}	bromine pentafluoride	7789–30–2
BrN_{3}	bromine azide	13973–87–0
BrO_{2}	bromine dioxide	21255–83–4
Br_{2}O	bromine monoxide	21308–80–5

== C ==
Chemical formula	Synonyms	CAS number
C_{10}H_{16}N_{2}O_{8}	Ethylenediaminetetraacetic acid (EDTA)	6381–92–6
C_{12}H_{22}O_{11}	sucrose	57–50–1
C_{18}H_{29}O_{3}S	sodium dodecyl benzenesulfonate	25155-30-0
C_{20}H_{25}N_{30}	Lysergic acid diethylamide (LSD)	50–37–3
C_{123}H_{193}N_{35}O_{37}	Common serum albumin (macromolecule)	9048–49–1
Ca(AlH_{4})_{2}	calcium tetrahydroaluminate	16941–10–9
CaAl_{2}O_{4}	calcium aluminate	12042–68–1
CaB_{6}	calcium boride	12007–99–7
CaBr_{2}	calcium bromide	7789–41–5
Ca(CHO_{2})_{2}	calcium formate	544–17–2
Ca(CN)_{2}	calcium cyanide	592–01–8
CaCN_{2}	calcium cyanamide	156–62–7
CaCO_{3}	calcium carbonate	471–34–1
CaC_{2}	calcium carbide	75–20–7
Ca(C_{2}HO_{2})_{2}	calcium fumarate	19855–56–2
Ca(C_{2}H_{3}O_{2})_{2}	calcium acetate	62–54–4
CaC_{2}O_{4}	calcium oxalate	563–72–4
Ca(C_{3}H_{5}O_{2})_{2}	calcium propionate	4075–81–4
Ca(ClO_{3})_{2}	calcium chlorate	10137–74–3
Ca(ClO_{4})_{2}	calcium perchlorate	13477–36–6
CaCl_{2}	calcium chloride	10043–52–4
CaCl_{2}•6H_{2}O	calcium chloride hexahydrate	7774–34–7
CaCl_{2}O_{2}	calcium hypochlorite	7778–54–3
CaCr_{2}O_{7}	calcium chromate	14307–33–6
CaF_{2}	calcium fluoride	7789–75–5
CaHPO_{4}	calcium hydrogenorthophosphate	7757–93–9
CaH_{2}	calcium hydride	7789–78–8
Ca(H_{2}PO_{2})_{2}	calcium hypophosphite	7789–79–9
Ca(H_{2}PO_{4})_{2}	calcium dihydrogen phosphate monohydrate	7758–23–8
Ca(IO_{3})_{2}	calcium iodate	7789–80–2
CaI_{2}	calcium iodide	10102–68–8
Ca(MnO_{4})_{2}	calcium permanganate	10118–76–0
CaMoO_{4}	calcium molybdate	7789–82–4
Ca(NO_{2})_{2}	calcium nitrite	13780–06–8
Ca(NO_{3})_{2}	calcium nitrate	10124–37–5
CaO	calcium oxide	1305–78–8
Ca(OH)_{2}	calcium hydroxide	1305–62–0
CaO_{2}	calcium peroxide	1305–79–9
CaRe_{2}O_{8}	calcium perrhenate	13768–54–2
CaS	calcium sulfide	20548–54–3
CaSO_{4}	calcium sulfate	7778–18–9
CaSe	calcium selenide	1305–84–6
CaSiO_{3}	calcium metasilicate	1344–95–2
CaSi_{2}	calcium silicide	12013–56–8
CaTe	calcium telluride	12013–57–9
CaTiO_{3}	calcium titanate	12049–50–2
CaWO_{4}	calcium tungstate	7790–75–2
Ca_{2}P_{2}O_{7}	calcium pyrophosphate	7790–76–3
Ca_{2}SiO_{4}	calcium silicate	1344–95–2
Ca_{3}(AsO_{4})_{2}	calcium arsenate	7778–44–1
Ca_{3}(C_{6}H_{15}O_{7})_{2}	calcium citrate	5785–44–4
Ca_{3}N_{2}	calcium nitride	12013–82–0
Ca_{3}(PO_{4})_{2}	calcium phosphate	7758–87–4
Ca_{3}P_{2}	calcium phosphide	1305–99–3
CdBr_{2}	cadmium bromide	7789–42–6
Cd(CN)_{2}	cadmium cyanide	542–83–6
CdCO_{3}	cadmium carbonate	513–78–0
Cd(C_{2}H_{3}O_{2})_{2}	cadmium acetate	543–90–8
CdC_{2}O_{4}	cadmium oxalate	814–88–0
CdCl_{2}	cadmium chloride	10108–64–2
CdCrO_{4}	cadmium chromate	14312–00–6
CdF_{2}	cadmium fluoride	7790–79–6
Cd(IO_{3})_{2}	cadmium iodate	7790–81–0
CdI_{2}	cadmium iodide	7790–80–9
CdMoO_{4}	cadmium molybdate	13972–68–4
Cd(NO_{3})_{2}	cadmium nitrate	10325–94–7
Cd(N_{3})_{2}	cadmium azide	14215–29–3
CdO	cadmium oxide	1306–19–0
Cd(OH)_{2}	cadmium hydroxide	21041–95–2
CdS	cadmium sulfide	1306–23–6
CdSO_{4}	cadmium sulfate	10124–36–4
CdSb	cadmium antimonide	12014–29–8
CdSe	cadmium selenide	1306–24–7
CdSiO_{3}	cadmium silicate	13477–19–5
CdTe	cadmium telluride	1306–25–8
CdTiO_{4}	cadmium titanate	12014–14–1
CdWO_{4}	cadmium tungstate	7790–85–4
Cd_{2}Nb_{2}O_{7}	cadmium niobate	12187–14–3
Cd_{3}As_{2}	cadmium arsenide	12006–15–4
Cd_{3}P_{2}	cadmium phosphide	12014–28–7
Cd_{3}N_{2}	cadmium nitride	12380–95–9
CeBr_{3}	cerium(III) bromide	7790–86–5
Ce(CHO_{2})_{3}	cerium(III) formate	3252–51–5
CeCl_{3}	cerium(III) chloride	7790–86–5
CeF_{2}	cerium(II) fluoride	22655–57–8
CeF_{3}	cerium(III) fluoride	7758–88–5
CeF_{4}	cerium(IV) fluoride	10060–10–3
CeH_{2}	cerium(II) hydride	13569–50–1
CeI_{2}	cerium(II) iodide	19139–47–0
CeI_{3}	cerium(III) iodide	7790–87–6
CeN	cerium(III) nitride	25764–08–3
CeO_{2}	cerium(IV) oxide	1306–38–3
CeS	cerium(II) sulfide	12014–82–3
CeVO_{2}	cerium(III) vanadate	13597–19–8
Ce_{2}(C_{2}O_{4})_{3}	cerium(III) oxalate	15750–47–7
Ce_{2}O_{3}	cerium(III) oxide	1306–38–3
Ce_{2}S_{3}	cerium(III) sulfide	12014–93–6
CfBr_{2}	californium(II) bromide	36700–18–2
CfBr_{3}	californium(III) bromide	20758–68–3
CfCl_{2}	californium(II) chloride	99643–99–9
CfCl_{3}	californium(III) chloride	13536–90–8
CfF_{3}	californium(III) fluoride	42775–52–0
CfF_{4}	californium(IV) fluoride	42845–08–9
CfI_{2}	californium(II) iodide	49774–08–5
CfI_{3}	californium(III) iodide	20758–81–0
CfO_{2}	californium(IV) oxide	12015–10–0
Cf_{2}O_{3}	californium(III) oxide	12050–91–8
(CH3)_{2}SO	Dimethyl sulfoxide (DMSO)	67–68–5
ClF	chlorine monofluoride	7790–89–8
ClF_{3}	chlorine trifluoride	7790–91–2
ClF_{5}	chlorine pentafluoride	13637–63–3
ClOClO_{3}	chlorine perchlorate	27218–16–2
Cl_{2}O	chlorine monoxide	7791–21–1
ClO_{2}	chlorine dioxide	10049–04–4
Cl_{2}O_{3}	chlorine trioxide	17496–59–2
Cl_{2}O_{6}	chlorine hexoxide	12442–63–6
Cl_{2}O_{7}	chlorine heptoxide	10294–48–1
CmBr_{3}	curium(III) bromide	14890–42–7
CmCl_{3}	curium(III) chloride	13537–20–7
CmF_{3}	curium(III) fluoride	13708–79–7
CmF_{4}	curium(IV) fluoride	24311–95–3
CmI_{3}	curium(III) iodide	14696–85–6
CmO	curium(II) oxide	24762–86–5
CmO_{2}	curium(IV) oxide	12016–67–0
Cm_{2}O_{3}	curium(III) oxide	12371–27–6
CHN	hydrogen cyanide	74–90–8
CoAl_{2}O_{4}	cobalt(II) aluminate	13820–62–7
CoBr_{2}	cobalt(II) bromide	7789–43–7
Co(CN)_{2}	cobalt(II) cyanide	542–84–7
Co(C_{2}H_{3}O_{2})_{2}	cobalt(II) acetate	71–48–7
Co(C_{2}H_{3}O_{2})_{2}	cobalt(II) acetate tetrahydrate	6147–53–1
CoC_{2}O_{4}	cobalt(II) oxalate	814–89–1
Co(C_{11}H_{10}O_{2})_{2}	cobalt(II) naphthenate	61789–51–3
CoC_{15}H_{21}O_{6}	cobalt(III) acetylacetonate	21679–46–9
Co(ClO_{4})_{2}	cobalt(II) perchlorate	13455–31–7
CoCl_{2}	cobalt(II) chloride	7646–79–9
CoCl_{2}•6H_{2}O	cobalt(II) chloride hexahydrate	7791–13–1
CoCl_{3}	cobalt(III) chloride	10241–04–0
CoCrO_{4}	cobalt(II) chromate	24613–38–5
CoCr_{2}O_{4}	cobalt(II) chromite	13455–25–9
CoF_{2}	cobalt(II) fluoride	10026–17–2
CoF_{3}	cobalt(III) fluoride	10026–18–3
CoF_{4}	cobalt(IV) fluoride	13596–45–7
CoI_{2}	cobalt(II) iodide	15238–00–3
Co(IO_{3})_{2}	cobalt(II) iodate	13455–28–2
CoMoO_{4}	cobalt(II) molybdate	13762–14–6
Co(NO_{3})_{2}	cobalt(II) nitrate	10141–05–6
Co(NO_{3})_{2}•6H_{2}O	cobalt(II) nitrate hexahydrate	10026–22–9
Co(NO_{3})_{3}	cobalt(III) nitrate	15520–84–0
CoO	cobalt(II) oxide	1307–96–6
Co(OH)_{2}	cobalt(II) hydroxide	21041–93–0
Co(OH)_{3}	cobalt(III) hydroxide	1307–86–4
CoS	cobalt(II) sulfide	1317–42–6
CoS_{2}	cobalt(IV) sulfide	12013–10–4
CoSe	cobalt(II) selenide	1307–99–9
CoTe	cobalt(II) telluride	12017–13–9
CoTiO_{3}	cobalt(II) titanate	12017–01–5
CoWO_{4}	cobalt(II) tungstate	12640–47–0
Co_{2}O_{3}	cobalt(III) oxide	1308–04–9
Co_{2}O_{3}•H_{2}O	cobalt(III) oxide monohydrate	12016–80–7
CoSO_{4}	cobalt(II) sulfate	10124–43–3
Co_{2}S_{3}	cobalt(III) sulfide	1332–71–4
Co_{2}SiO_{4}	cobalt(II) orthosilicate	12017–08–2
Co_{2}SnO_{4}	cobalt(II) stannate	12139–93–4
Co_{2}TiO_{4}	cobalt(III) titanate	12017–38–8
Co_{3}(Fe(CN)_{6})_{2}	cobalt(II) ferricyanide	14049–81–1
CrBr_{2}	chromium(II) bromide	10049–25–9
CrBr_{3}	chromium(III) bromide	10031–25–1
CrBr_{4}	chromium(IV) bromide	23098–84–2
Cr(C_{6}H_{4}NO_{2})_{3}	chromium(III) picolinate	14639–25–9
Cr(CO)_{6}	chromium(VI) carbonyl	13007–92–6
CrCl_{2}	chromium(II) chloride	10049–05–5
CrCl_{3}	chromium(III) chloride	10025–73–7
CrCl_{4}	chromium(IV) chloride	15597–88–3
CrF_{2}	chromium(II) fluoride	10049–10–2
CrF_{3}	chromium(III) fluoride	7788–97–8
CrF_{4}	chromium(IV) fluoride	10049–11–3
CrF_{5}	chromium(V) fluoride	14884–42–5
CrF_{6}	chromium(VI) fluoride	13843–28–2
CrI_{2}	chromium(II) iodide	13478–28–9
CrI_{3}	chromium(III) iodide	13569–75–0
CrI_{4}	chromium(IV) iodide	23518–77–6
CrN	chromium(III) nitride	12053–27–9
Cr(NO_{3})_{3}	chromium(III) nitrate	13548–38–4
CrO_{2}	chromium(IV) oxide	12018–01–8
CrO_{3}	chromium(VI) oxide	1333–82–0
CrPO_{4}	chromium(III) phosphate	7789–04–0
CrSe	chromium(II) selenide	12053–13–3
CrO_{2}F_{2}	chromyl fluoride	7788–96–7
CrO_{2}Cl_{2}	chromyl chloride	14977–61–8
Cr_{2}O_{3}	chromium(III) oxide	1308–38–9
Cr_{2}(SO_{4})_{3}	chromium(III) sulfate	10101–53–8
Cr_{2}S_{3}	chromium(III) sulfide	12018–22–3
Cr_{2}Te_{3}	chromium(III) telluride	12053–39–3
Cr_{3}C_{2}	chromium(II) carbide	12012–35–0
Cr_{3}O_{4}	chromium(II,III) oxide	12018–34–7
CsBO_{2}	caesium metaborate	92141–86–1
CsBr	caesium bromide	7787–69–1
CsBrO_{3}	caesium bromate	13454–75–6
CsCN	caesium cyanide	21159–32–0
CsC_{2}H_{3}O_{2}	caesium acetate	3399–17–5
CsCl	caesium chloride	7647–17–8
CsClO_{3}	caesium chlorate	13763–67–2
CsClO_{4}	caesium perchlorate	13454–84–7
CsF	caesium fluoride	13400–13–0
CsH	caesium hydride	58724–12–2
CsI	caesium iodide	7789–17–5
CsIO_{3}	caesium iodate	13454–81–4
CsIO_{4}	caesium periodate	13478–04–1
CsMnO_{4}	caesium permanganate	13456–28–5
CsNH_{2}	caesium amide	22205–57–8
CsNO_{2}	caesium nitrite	13454–83–6
CsNO_{3}	caesium nitrate	7789–18–6
CsN_{3}	caesium azide	22750–57–8
CsOH	caesium hydroxide	21351–79–1
CsO_{2}	caesium superoxide	12018–61–0
CsVO_{3}	caesium vanadate	14644–55–4
Cs_{2}CO_{3}	caesium carbonate	534–17–8
Cs_{2}C_{2}O_{4}	caesium oxalate	1068–63–9
Cs_{2}CdI_{4}	caesium tetraiodocadamate	15683–21–3
Cs_{2}CrO_{4}	caesium chromate	56320–90–2
Cs_{2}MoO_{4}	caesium molybdate	13597–64–3
Cs_{2}O	caesium oxide	20281–00–9
Cs_{2}O_{2}	caesium peroxide	12053–70–2
Cs_{2}S	caesium sulfide	12214–16–3
Cs_{2}SO_{4}	caesium sulfate	10294–54–9
Cs_{2}Se	caesium selenide	31052–46–7
Cs_{2}Te	caesium telluride	12191–06–9
Cs_{2}WO_{4}	caesium tungstate	13587–19–4
Cs_{2}ZnI_{4}	caesium tetraiodozincate	15158–68–6
Cu(BF_{4})_{2}	copper(II) tetrafluoroborate	14735–84–3
Cu(BO_{2})_{2}	copper(II) borate	393290–85–2
CuBr	copper(I) bromide	7787–70–4
CuBr_{2}	copper(II) bromide	7789–45–9
Cu(CHO_{2})_{2}	copper(II) formate	544–19–4
CuCN	copper(I) cyanide	544–92–3
Cu(CN)_{2}	copper(II) cyanide	14763–77–0
CuC_{2}	copper(II) acetylide	1117–94–8
CuC_{2}H_{3}O_{2}	copper(I) acetate	598–54–9
Cu(C_{2}H_{3}O_{2})_{2}	copper(II) acetate	142–71–2
CuC_{2}O_{4}	copper(II) oxalate	814–91–5
Cu(C_{16}H_{35}O_{2})_{2}	copper(II) stearate	660–60–6
Cu(C_{18}H_{33}O_{2})_{2}	copper(II) oleate	1120–44–1
CuCl	copper(I) chloride	7758–89–6
Cu(ClO_{4})_{2}	copper(II) perchlorate	13770–18–8
CuCl_{2}	copper(II) chloride	7447–39–4
CuCl_{2}•2H_{2}O	copper(II) chloride dihydrate	10125–13–0
CuCrO_{4}	copper(II) chromate	13548–42–0
CuF	copper(I) fluoride	13478–41–6
CuF_{2}	copper(II) fluoride	7789–19–7
CuH	copper(I) hydride	13517–00–5
CuHAsO_{3}	copper(II) arsenite	10290–12–7
CuI	copper(I) iodide	7681–65–4
CuMoO_{4}	copper(II) molybdate	13767–34–5
Cu(NO_{3})_{2}	copper(II) nitrate	3251–23–8
CuN_{3}	copper(I) azide	14336–80–2
Cu(N_{3})_{2}	copper(II) azide	14215–30–6
CuO	copper(II) oxide	1317–38–0
Cu(OH)_{2}	copper(II) hydroxide	20427–59–2
CuS	copper(II) sulfide	1317–40–4
CuSCN	copper(I) thiocyanate	1111–67–7
CuSO_{4}	copper(II) sulfate	7758–98–7
CuSe	copper(II) selenide	1317–41–5
CuTe	copper(II) telluride	12019–23–7
CuWO_{4}	copper(II) tungstate	13587–35–4
Cu_{2}C_{2}	copper(I) acetylide	1117–94–8
Cu_{2}Fe(CN)_{6}	copper(II) ferrocyanide	13601–13–3
Cu_{2}O	copper(I) oxide	1317–39–1
Cu_{2}P_{2}O_{7}	copper(II) pyrophosphate	10102–90–6
Cu_{2}S	copper(I) sulfide	22205–45–4
Cu_{2}Se	copper(I) selenide	20405–64–5
Cu_{2}Te	copper(I) telluride	12019–52–2
Cu_{3}(AsO_{4})_{2}	copper(II) arsenate	10103–61–4

== D ==
Chemical formula	Synonyms	CAS number
DyB_{4}	dysprosium(II) boride	12310–43–9
DyBr_{2}	dysprosium(II) bromide	83229–05–4
DyBr_{3}	dysprosium(III) bromide	14456–48–5
Dy(CHO_{2})_{3}	dysprosium(III) formate	3252–58–2
DyCl_{2}	dysprosium(II) chloride	13767–31–2
DyCl_{3}	dysprosium(III) chloride	10025–74–8
DyF_{3}	dysprosium(III) fluoride	13569–80–7
DyH_{3}	dysprosium(III) hydride	13537–09–2
DyI_{2}	dysprosium(II) iodide	36377–94–3
DyI_{3}	dysprosium(III) iodide	15474–63–2
DyN	dysprosium(III) nitride	12019–88–4
DySi_{2}	dysprosium(II) silicide	12133–07–2
Dy_{2}O_{3}	dysprosium(III) oxide	1308–87–8
Dy_{2}S_{3}	dysprosium(III) sulfide	12133–10–7

== E ==
Chemical formula	Synonyms	CAS number
ErB_{4}	erbium(III) boride	12310–44–0
ErBr_{3}	erbium(III) bromide	13536–73–7
Er(CHO_{2})_{3}	erbium(III) formate	15331–72–3
ErCl_{3}	erbium(III) chloride	10138–41–7
ErCl_{3}•6H_{2}O	erbium(III) chloride hexahydrate	10025–75–9
ErF_{3}	erbium(III) fluoride	13760–83–3
ErH_{3}	erbium(III) hydride	13550–53–3
ErI_{3}	erbium(III) iodide	13813–42–8
ErN	erbium(III) nitride	12020–21–2
ErNbO_{4}	erbium(III) niobate	12061–00–6
ErS	erbium(II) sulfide	12159–66–9
ErTe	erbium(II) telluride	12020–39–2
ErVO_{4}	erbium(III) vanadate	13596–17–3
Er_{2}O_{3}	erbium(III) oxide	12061–16–4
Er_{2}(SO_{4})_{3}	erbium(III) sulfate	13478–49–4
Er_{2}S_{3}	erbium(III) sulfide	12159–66–9
Er_{2}Te_{3}	erbium(III) telluride	12020–39–2
EsBr_{2}	einsteinium(II) bromide	70292–43–2
EsBr_{3}	einsteinium(III) bromide	72461–17–7
EsCl_{2}	einsteinium(II) chloride	66693–95–6
EsCl_{3}	einsteinium(III) chloride	24645–86–1
EsF_{3}	einsteinium(III) fluoride	99644–27–6
EsI_{2}	einsteinium(II) iodide	70292–44–3
EsI_{3}	einsteinium(III) iodide	99644–28–7
Es_{2}O_{3}	einsteinium(III) oxide	37362–94–0
EuBr_{2}	europium(II) bromide	13780–48–8
EuBr_{3}	europium(III) bromide	13759–88–1
Eu(CHO_{2})_{3}	europium(III) formate	3252–55–9
EuCl_{2}	europium(II) chloride	13769–20–5
EuCl_{3}	europium(III) chloride	10025–76–0
EuF_{2}	europium(II) fluoride	14077–39–5
EuF_{3}	europium(III) fluoride	13765–25–8
EuI_{2}	europium(II) iodide	22015–35–6
EuI_{3}	europium(III) iodide	13759–90–5
EuN	europium(III) nitride	12020–58–5
Eu(NbO_{3})_{2}	europium(II) niobate	55216–32–5
EuS	europium(II) sulfide	12020–65–4
EuSe	europium(II) selenide	12020–66–5
EuSi_{2}	europium(II) silicide	12434–24–1
EuTe	europium(II) telluride	12020–69–8
EuVO_{4}	europium(II) vanadate	13537–11–6
Eu_{2}O_{3}	europium(III) oxide	1308–96–9
Eu_{2}(SO_{4})_{3}	europium(III) sulfate	13537–15–0

== F ==
Chemical formula	Synonyms	CAS number
FNO_{3}	fluorine nitrate	7789–26–6
FOClO_{3}	fluorine perchlorate	10049–03–3
F_{2}O	fluorine monoxide	7783–41–7
F_{2}O_{2}	fluorine dioxide	7783–44–0
Fe	iron	7439–89–6
Fe(AlO_{2})_{2}	iron(II) aluminate	12068–49–4
FeAs	iron(III) arsenide	12044–16–5
FeBr_{2}	iron(II) bromide	7789–46–0
FeBr_{3}	iron(III) bromide	10031–26–2
FeCO_{3}	iron(II) carbonate	563–71–3
Fe(C_{2}H_{3}O_{2})_{2}	iron(II) acetate	3094–87–9
FeCl_{2}	iron(II) chloride	7758–94–3
FeCl_{2}•2H_{2}O	iron(II) chloride dihydrate	16399–77–2
FeCl_{2}•4H_{2}O	iron(II) chloride tetrahydrate	13478–10–9
FeCl_{3}	iron(III) chloride	7705–08–0
FeCl_{3}•6H_{2}O	iron(III) chloride hexahydrate	10025–77–1
FeCr_{2}O_{4}	iron chromite	1308–31–2
FeF_{2}	iron(II) fluoride	7789–28–8
FeF_{2}•4H_{2}O	iron(II) fluoride tetrahydrate	13940–89–1
FeF_{3}	iron(III) fluoride	7783–50–8
FeF_{3}•3H_{2}O	iron(III) fluoride trihydrate	15469–38–2
Fe(H_{2}PO_{2})_{3}	iron(III) hypophosphite	7783–84–8
FeI_{2}	iron(II) iodide	7783–86–0
FeI_{3}	iron(III) iodide	15600–49–4
FeMoO_{4}	iron(II) molybdate	13718–70–2
Fe(NO_{3})_{2}	iron(II) nitrate	14013–86–6
Fe(NO_{3})_{3}	ferric nitrate	10421–48–4
FeO	iron(II) oxide	1345–25–1
Fe(OH)_{2}	iron(II) hydroxide	18624–44–7
Fe(OH)_{3}	iron(III) hydroxide	1309–33–7
FePO_{4}	iron(III) phosphate	10045–86–0
FeS	iron(II) sulfide	1317–37–9
FeSO_{4}	iron(II) sulfate	7720–78–7
FeSe	iron(II) selenide	1310–32–3
FeTe	iron(II) telluride	12125–63–2
FeTiO_{4}	iron(II) titanate	12168–52–4
Fe(VO_{3})_{3}	iron(III) metavanadate	65842–03–7
FeWO_{4}	iron(II) tungstate	13870–24–1
Fe_{2}(C_{2}O_{4})_{3}	iron(III) oxalate	19469–07–9
Fe_{2}(CrO_{4})_{3}	iron(III) chromate	10294–52–7
Fe_{2}(Cr_{2}O_{7})_{3}	iron(III) dichromate	10294–53–8
Fe_{2}O_{3}	iron(III) oxide	1309–37–1
Fe_{2}(SO_{4})_{3}	iron(III) sulfate	10028–22–5
Fe_{2}SiO_{4}	iron(II) orthosilicate	10179–73–4
Fe_{3}O_{4}	iron(II,III) oxide	1317–61–9
Fe_{3}(PO_{4})_{2}	iron(II) phosphate	14940–41–1
Fe_{4}(Fe(CN)_{6})_{3}	iron(III) ferrocyanide	14038–43–8
Fe_{4}(P_{2}O_{7})_{3}	iron(III) pyrophosphate	10058–44–3

== G ==
Chemical formula	Synonyms	CAS number
GaAs	gallium(III) arsenide	1303–00–0
GaBr_{3}	gallium(III) bromide	13450–88–9
GaCl_{2}	gallium(II) chloride	24597–12–4
GaCl_{3}	gallium trichloride	13450–90–3
GaF_{3}	gallium(III) fluoride	7783–51–9
GaF_{3}•3H_{2}O	gallium(III) fluoride trihydrate	22886–66–4
GaH_{3}	gallium(III) hydride	13572–93–5
GaI_{3}	gallium(III) iodide	13450–91–4
GaN	gallium(III) nitride	25617–97–4
Ga(NO_{3})_{3}	gallium(III) nitrate	13494–90–1
GaO	gallium(II) oxide	12024–08–7
Ga(OH)_{3}	gallium(III) hydroxide	12023–99–3
GaP	gallium(III) phosphide	12063–98–8
GaS	gallium(II) sulfide	12024–10–1
GaSb	gallium(III) antimonide	12064–03–8
GaSe	gallium(II) selenide	12024–11–2
GaTe	gallium(II) telluride	12024–14–5
Ga_{2}Cl_{4}	gallium(I,III) chloride	24597–12–4
Ga_{2}O	gallium(I) oxide	12024–20–3
Ga_{2}O_{3}	gallium(III) oxide	12024–21–4
Ga_{2}S_{3}	gallium(III) sulfide	12024–22–5
Ga_{2}(SO_{4})_{3}	gallium(III) sulfate	13494–91–2
Ga_{2}Se_{3}	gallium(III) selenide	12024–24–7
Ga_{2}Te_{3}	gallium(III) telluride	12024–27–0
GdBr_{3}	gadolinium(III) bromide	13818–75–2
Gd(CHO_{2})_{3}	gadolinium(III) formate	3252–56–0
GdCl_{3}	gadolinium(III) chloride	10138–52–0
GdCl_{3}•6H_{2}O	gadolinium(III) chloride hexahydrate	19423–81–5
GdF_{3}	gadolinium(III) fluoride	13765–26–9
GdI_{2}	gadolinium(II) iodide	13814–72–7
GdI_{3}	gadolinium(III) iodide	13572–98–0
GdN	gadolinium(III) nitride	25764–15–2
GdSe	gadolinium(II) selenide	12024–81–6
GdSi_{2}	gadolinium(II) silicide	12134–75–7
Gd_{2}O_{3}	gadolinium(III) oxide	12064–62–9
Gd_{2}S_{3}	gadolinium(III) sulfide	12134–77–9
Gd_{2}Te_{3}	gadolinium(III) telluride	12160–99–5
GeBr_{2}	germanium(II) bromide	24415–00–7
GeBr_{4}	germanium(IV) bromide	13450–92–5
Ge(CH_{3}O)_{4}	germanium(IV) methoxide	992–91–6
GeCl_{2}	germanium(II) chloride	10060–11–4
GeCl_{4}	germanium(IV) chloride	10038–98–9
GeF_{2}	germanium(II) fluoride	13940–63–1
GeF_{4}	germanium(IV) fluoride	7783–58–6
GeH_{4}	germanium(IV) hydride	7782–65–2
GeI_{2}	germanium(II) iodide	13573–08–5
GeI_{4}	germanium(IV) iodide	13450–95–8
GeO	germanium(II) oxide	20619–16–3
GeO_{2}	germanium(IV) oxide	1310–53–8
GeS	germanium(II) sulfide	12025–32–0
GeS_{2}	germanium(IV) sulfide	12025–34–2
GeSe	germanium(II) selenide	12065–10–0
GeSe_{2}	germanium(IV) selenide	12065–11–1
GeTe	germanium(II) telluride	12025–39–7
Ge_{3}N_{4}	germanium(IV) nitride	12065–36–0

== H ==
Chemical formula	Synonyms	CAS number
H_{2}O	water	7732–18–5
H_{2}SO_{4}	sulfuric acid	7664–93–9
H_{3}BO_{3}	boric acid	10043–35–3
HfB_{2}	hafnium boride	12007–23–7
HfBr_{4}	hafnium bromide	13777–22–5
HfC	hafnium carbide	12069–85–1
HfCl_{4}	hafnium chloride	13499–05–3
HfF_{4}	hafnium(IV) fluoride	13709–52–9
HfH_{2}	hafnium hydride	12770–26–2
HfI_{3}	hafnium iodide	13779–73–2
HfN	hafnium nitride	25817–87–2
HfO_{2}	hafnium oxide	12055–23–1
HfP	hafnium phosphide	12325–59–6
Hf(SO_{4})_{2}	hafnium sulfate	15823–43–5
HfS_{2}	hafnium sulfide	18855–94–2
HfSe_{2}	hafnium selenide	12162–21–9
HfSiO_{4}	hafnium orthosilicate	13870–13–8
HfSi_{2}	hafnium silicide	12401–56–8
HgBr_{2}	mercury(II) bromide	7789–47–1
Hg(C_{2}H_{3}O_{2})_{2}	mercury(II) acetate	1600–27–7
HgCl_{2}	mercury(II) chloride	7487–94–7
HgCl_{2}O_{8}	mercury(II) perchlorate	73491–34–6
HgF_{2}	mercury(II) fluoride	7783–39–3
HgH_{2}	mercury(II) hydride	72172–67–9
Hg(IO_{3})_{2}	mercury(II) iodate	7783–32–6
HgI_{2}	mercury(II) iodide	7774–29–0
Hg(NO_{3})_{2}	mercury(II) nitrate	10045–94–0
HgO	mercury(II) oxide	21908–53–2
Hg(ONC)_{2}	mercury(II) fulminate	628–86–4
HgS	mercury(II) sulfide	1344–48–5
Hg(SCN)_{2}	mercury(II) thiocyanate	592–85–8
HgSO_{4}	mercury(II) sulfate	7783–35–9
HgSe	mercury(II) selenide	20601–83–6
HgTe	mercury(II) telluride	12068–90–5
Hg_{2}Br_{2}	mercury(I) bromide	15385–58–7
Hg_{2}Cl_{2}	mercury(I) chloride	10112–91–1
Hg_{2}F_{2}	mercury(I) fluoride	1396–75–4
Hg_{2}I_{2}	mercury(I) iodide	15385–57–6
Hg_{2}O	mercury(I) oxide	15829–53–5
HoBr_{3}	holmium bromide	13825–76–8
Ho(CHO_{2})_{3}	holmium formate	3252–59–3
HoCl_{3}	holmium chloride	10138–62–2
HoF_{3}	holmium fluoride	13760–78–6
HoI_{3}	holmium(III) iodide	13813–41–7
HoN	holmium nitride	12029–81–1
HoSi_{2}	holmium silicide	12136–24–2
HoVO_{4}	holmium vanadate	13977–63–4
Ho_{2}O_{3}	holmium oxide	12055–62–8
Ho_{2}S_{3}	holmium sulfide	12162–59–3

== I ==
Chemical formula	Synonyms	CAS number
IBr	iodine monobromide	7789–33–5
ICl	iodine monochloride	7790–99–0
ICl_{3}	iodine trichloride	865–44–1
IF	iodine monofluoride	13873–84–2
IF_{3}	iodine(III) fluoride	22520–96–3
IF_{5}	iodine pentafluoride	7783–66–6
IF_{7}	iodine heptafluoride	16921–96–3
IN_{3}	iodine monoazide	14696–82–3
I_{2}O_{4}	diiodine tetroxide	12399–08–5
I_{2}O_{5}	diiodine pentoxide	12029–98–0
InAs	indium(III) arsenide	1303–11–3
InBr	indium(I) bromide	14280–53–6
InBr_{2}	indium(II) bromide	21264–43–7
InBr_{3}	indium(III) bromide	13465–09–3
In(C_{2}H_{3}O_{2})_{3}	indium(III) acetate	25114–58–3
InCl	indium(I) chloride	13465–10–6
InCl_{2}	indium(II) chloride	13465–11–7
InCl_{3}	indium(III) chloride	10025–82–8
InF	indium(I) fluoride	74508–07–9
InF_{3}	indium(III) fluoride	7783–52–0
InF_{3}•3H_{2}O	indium(III) fluoride trihydrate	14166–78–0
InF_{3}•9H_{2}O	indium(III) fluoride nonahydrate	7783–52–0
InH	indium(I) hydride	13939–13–4
InI	indium(I) iodide	13465–10–6
InI_{3}	indium(III) iodide	13510–35–5
InN	indium(III) nitride	25617–98–5
In(OH)_{3}	indium(III) hydroxide	20661–21–6
InP	indium(III) phosphide	22398–80–7
InPO_{4}	indium(III) phosphate	14693–82–4
InS	indium(II) sulfide	12030–14–7
InSb	indium(III) antimonide	1312–41–0
InSe	indium(II) selenide	1312–42–1
InTe	indium(II) telluride	12030–19–2
In_{2}I_{4}	indium(I,III) iodide	13779–78–7
In_{2}O_{3}	indium(III) oxide	1312–43–2
In_{2}(SO_{4})_{3}	indium(III) sulfate	13464–82–9
In_{2}S_{3}	indium(III) sulfide	12030–24–9
In_{2}Se_{3}	indium(III) selenide	1312–42–1
In_{2}Te_{3}	indium(III) telluride	1312–45–4
IrBr_{2}	iridium(II) bromide	77791–70–9
IrBr_{3}	iridium(III) bromide	10049–24–8
IrBr_{4}	iridium(IV) bromide	7789–64–2
IrCl_{2}	iridium(II) chloride	13465–17–3
IrCl_{3}	iridium(III) chloride	10025–83–9
IrCl_{4}	iridium(IV) chloride	10025–97–5
IrF_{3}	iridium(III) fluoride	23370–59–4
IrF_{4}	iridium(IV) fluoride	37501–24–9
IrF_{5}	iridium(V) fluoride	14568–19–5
IrF_{6}	iridium(VI) fluoride	7783–75–7
IrI_{2}	iridium(II) iodide	19253–38–4
IrI_{3}	iridium(III) iodide	7790–41–2
IrI_{4}	iridium(IV) iodide	7790–45–6
IrO_{2}	iridium(IV) oxide	12030–49–8
IrO_{2}•2H_{2}O	iridium(IV) oxide dihydrate	30980–84–8
IrS_{2}	iridium(IV) sulfide	12030–51–2
IrSe_{2}	iridium(IV) selenide	12030–55–6
IrTe_{3}	iridium(VI) telluride	12196–62–2
Ir_{2}O_{3}	iridium(III) oxide	12030–49–8
Ir_{2}S_{3}	iridium(III) sulfide	12136–42–4

== K ==
Chemical formula	Synonyms	CAS number
KAlF_{4}	potassium tetrafluoroaluminate	14484–69–6
KAlO_{2}	potassium aluminate	12003–63–3
KBF_{4}	potassium fluoroborate	14075–53–7
KBr	potassium bromide	7758–02–3
KBrO_{3}	potassium bromate	7758–01–2
KCHF_{3}O_{3}S	potassium trifluoromethanesulfonate	2926–27–4
KCHO_{2}	potassium formate	590–29–4
KCH_{3}O	potassium methoxide	865–33–8
KCN	potassium cyanide	151–50–8
KCNO	potassium cyanate	590–28–3
KC_{2}HO_{4}	potassium binoxalate	127–95–7
KC_{2}H_{3}O_{2}	potassium acetate	127–08–2
KC_{2}H_{5}O	potassium ethoxide	917–58–8
KC_{3}H_{5}O_{2}	potassium propionate	327–62–8
KC_{3}H_{5}S_{2}O	potassium xanthogenate	140–89–6
KC_{3}H_{7}NS_{2}	potassium dimethyldithiocarbamate	128–03–0
KC_{4}H_{5}O_{6}	potassium bitartrate	868–14–4
KC_{7}H_{5}O_{2}	potassium benzoate	582–25–2
KCl	potassium chloride	7447–40–7
KClO_{3}	potassium chlorate	3811–04–9
KClO_{4}	potassium perchlorate	7778–74–7
K_{2}CuCl_{4}	potassium tetrachlorocuprate	13877–24–2
KF	potassium fluoride	7789–23–3
KH	potassium hydride	7693–26–7
KHCO_{3}	potassium bicarbonate	298–14–6
K(HF_{2})	potassium bifluoride	7789–29–9
KHSO_{4}	potassium bisulfate	7646–93–7
KH_{2}PO_{4}	potassium diphosphate	7778–77–0
KH_{4}B	potassium borohydride	13762–51–1
KI	potassium iodide	7681–11–0
KIO_{3}	potassium iodate	7758–05–6
KIO_{4}	potassium periodate	7790–21–8
KMnO_{4}	potassium permanganate	7722–64–7
KNO_{2}	potassium nitrite	7758–09–0
KNO_{3}	potassium nitrate	7757–79–1
KN_{3}	potassium azide	20762–60–1
KNbO_{3}	potassium niobate	12030–85–2
KOH	potassium hydroxide	1310–58–3
KO_{2}	potassium superoxide	12030–88–5
KPF_{6}	potassium hexafluorophosphate	17084–13–8
KPO_{3}	potassium metaphosphate	7790–53–6
KReO_{4}	potassium perrhenate	10466–65–6
KRuO_{4}	potassium perruthenate	10378–50–4
KSCN	potassium thiocyanate	333–20–0
KVO_{3}	potassium metavanadate	13769–43–2
K_{2}CO_{3}	potassium carbonate	584–08–7
K_{2}C_{2}O_{4}	potassium oxalate	583–52–8
K_{2}C_{4}H_{6}O_{6}	potassium tartrate	921–53–9
K_{2}C_{6}H_{8}O_{4}	potassium adipate	19147–16–1
K_{2}CrO_{4}	potassium chromate	7789–00–6
K_{2}Cr_{2}O_{7}	potassium dichromate	7778–50–9
K_{2}FeO_{4}	potassium ferrate	39469–86–8
K_{2}S_{2}O_{3}	potassium thiosulfate	10294–66–3
K_{2}O	potassium oxide	12136–45–7
K_{2}O_{2}	potassium peroxide	17014–71–0
K_{2}PdCl_{4}	potassium tetrachloropalladate	10025–98–6
K_{2}RuCl_{6}	potassium hexachlororuthenate	18746–63–9
K_{2}S	potassium sulfide	1312–73–8
K_{2}SO_{4}	potassium sulfate	7778–80–5
K_{2}S_{2}O_{5}	potassium metabisulfite	16731–55–8
K_{2}S_{2}O_{7}	potassium pyrosulfate	7790–62–7
K_{2}S_{2}O_{8}	potassium persulfate	7727–21–1
K_{2}Se	potassium selenide	1312–74–9
K_{2}SiF_{6}	potassium hexafluorosilicate	16871–90–2
K_{2}SiO_{4}	potassium silicate	10006–28–7
K_{2}Te	potassium telluride	12142–40–4
K_{2}TeO_{3}	potassium tellurite	15571–91–2
K_{2}TiF_{6}	potassium hexafluorotitanate	16919–27–0
K_{2}ZrF_{6}	potassium hexafluorozirconate	16923–95–8
K_{3}AlF_{6}	potassium hexafluoroaluminate	13775–52–5
K_{3}(Fe(CN)_{6})	potassium ferricyanide	13746–66–2
K_{3}PO_{4}	potassium phosphate	7778–53–2
K_{4}P_{2}O_{7}	potassium pyrophosphate	7320–34–5
KrF_{2}	krypton difluoride	13773–81–4

== L ==
Chemical formula	Synonyms	CAS number
LaAlO_{3}	lanthanum aluminate	71496–78–1
LaB_{6}	lanthanum boride	12008–21–8
LaBr_{3}	lanthanum bromide	13536–79–3
La(CHO_{2})_{3}	lanthanum formate	2081–11–0
LaC_{2}	lanthanum carbide	12071–15–7
LaCl_{3}	lanthanum chloride	10099–58–8
LaCl_{3}•3H_{2}O	lanthanum chloride trihydrate	35564–84–2
LaCl_{3}•7H_{2}O	lanthanum chloride heptahydrate	10025–84–0
LaF_{3}	lanthanum fluoride	13709–38–1
LaH_{3}	lanthanum hydride	13864–01–2
LaI_{3}	lanthanum iodide	13813–22–4
LaN	lanthanum nitride	25764–10–7
LaNbO_{4}	lanthanum niobate	12031–17–3
LaSi_{2}	lanthanum silicide	12056–90–5
LaVO_{4}	lanthanum vanadate	13939–40–7
La_{2}O_{3}	lanthanum oxide	1312–81–8
La_{2}S_{3}	lanthanum sulfide	12031–49–1
LiAlH_{4}	lithium tetrahydridoaluminate	16853–85–3
LiAlO_{2}	lithium aluminate	12003–67–7
LiBF_{4}	lithium tetrafluoroborate	14283–07–9
LiBH_{4}	lithium borohydride	16949–15–8
LiBO_{2}	lithium metaborate	13453–69–5
LiBr	lithium bromide	7550–35–8
LiCHO_{2}	lithium formate	556–63–8
LiCH_{3}O	lithium methoxide	865–34–9
LiC_{7}H_{5}O_{2}	lithium benzoate	553–54–8
LiCl	lithium chloride	7447–41–8
LiCl•H_{2}O	lithium chloride monohydrate	16712–20–2
LiClO_{4}	lithium perchlorate	7791–03–9
LiF	lithium fluoride	7789–24–4
LiH	lithium hydride	7580–67–8
LiI	lithium iodide	10377–51–2
LiI•3H_{2}O	lithium iodide trihydrate	7790–22–9
LiN(C_{3}H_{7})_{2}	lithium diisopropylamide	4111–54–0
LiNH_{2}	lithium amide	7782–89–0
LiNO_{3}	lithium nitrate	7790–69–4
LiN_{3}	lithium azide	19597–69–4
LiNbO_{3}	lithium niobate	12031–63–9
LiOH	lithium hydroxide	1310–65–2
LiO_{2}	lithium superoxide	12136–56–0
LiPF_{6}	lithium hexafluorophosphate	21324–40–3
LiPH_{2}O_{4}	lithium dihydrogenphosphate	13453–80–0
LiReO_{4}	lithium perrhenate	13768–48–4
LiTaO_{3}	lithium tantalate	12031–66–2
LiVO_{3}	lithium metavanadate	15060–59–0
Li_{2}B_{4}O_{7}	lithium borate	12007–60–2
Li_{2}CO_{3}	lithium carbonate	554–13–2
Li_{2}MoO_{4}	lithium molybdate	13568–40–6
Li_{2}O	lithium oxide	12057–24–8
Li_{2}O_{2}	lithium peroxide	12031–80–0
Li_{2}S	lithium sulfide	12136–58–2
Li_{2}SO_{4}	lithium sulfate	10377–48–7
Li_{2}Se	lithium selenide	12136–60–6
Li_{2}SiO_{3}	lithium metasilicate	10102–24–6
Li_{2}Te	lithium telluride	12136–59–3
Li_{2}TiO_{3}	lithium titanate	12031–82–2
Li_{2}ZrO_{3}	lithium zirconate	51222–70–9
Li_{3}AlF_{6}	lithium hexafluoroaluminate	13821–20–0
Li_{3}AsO_{4}	lithium arsenate	13478–14–3
Li_{3}C_{6}H_{5}O_{7}	lithium citrate	919–16–4
Li_{3}ClO_{4}	lithium perchlorate	7791–03–9
Li_{3}N	lithium nitride	26134–62–3
Li_{3}PO_{4}	lithium phosphate	10377–52–3
Li_{3}Sb	lithium antimonide	12057–30–6
LuB_{4}	lutetium boride	12688–52–7
LuBr_{3}	lutetium bromide	14456–53–2
LuCl_{3}	lutetium chloride	10099–66–8
LuF_{3}	lutetium fluoride	13760–81–1
LuI_{3}	lutetium iodide	13813–45–1
LuN	lutetium nitride	12125–25–6
Lu(NO_{3})_{3}	lutetium nitrate	36549–50–5
Lu_{2}O_{3}	lutetium oxide	12032–20–1
Lu_{2}S_{3}	lutetium sulfide	12163–20–1
Lu_{2}Te_{3}	lutetium telluride	12163–22–3

== M ==
Chemical formula	Synonyms	CAS number
MgBr_{2}	magnesium bromide	7789–48–2
MgBr_{2}•6H_{2}O	magnesium bromide hexahydrate	13446–53–2
MgCO_{3}	magnesium carbonate	546–93–0
Mg(C_{2}H_{2}O_{2})_{2}	magnesium succinate	556–32–1
MgC_{3}H_{9}O_{6}P	magnesium glycerophosphate	927–20–8
MgC_{36}H_{70}O_{4}	magnesium stearate	557–04–0
Mg(ClO_{4})_{2}	magnesium perchlorate	10034–81–8
MgCl_{2}	magnesium chloride	7786–30–3
MgF_{2}	magnesium fluoride	7783–40–6
MgH_{2}	magnesium hydride	7693–27–8
MgI_{2}	magnesium iodide	10377–58–9
Mg(NO_{3})_{2}	magnesium nitrate	10377–60–3
MgO	magnesium oxide	1309–48–4
Mg(OH)_{2}	magnesium hydroxide	1309–42–8
MgO_{2}	magnesium peroxide	1335–26–8
MgS	magnesium sulfide	12032–36–9
MgSO_{4}	magnesium sulfate	7487–88–9
MgSe	magnesium selenide	1313–04–8
MgSiO_{3}	magnesium silicate	14654–06–9
Mg(TcO_{4})_{2}	magnesium technetate	71683–38–0
MgTe	magnesium telluride	12032–44–9
MgTiO_{3}	magnesium titanate	12032–30–3
Mg_{2}Si	magnesium silicide	22831–39–6
Mg_{3}(AsO_{4})_{2}	magnesium arsenate	10103–50–1
Mg_{3}N_{2}	magnesium nitride	12057–71–5
Mg_{3}Sb_{2}	magnesium antimonide	12057–75–9
MnBr_{2}	manganese(II) bromide	13446–03–2
Mn(C_{2}H_{3}O_{2})_{2}	manganese(II) acetate	638–38–0
MnCO_{3}	manganese(II) carbonate	598–62–9
MnCl_{2}	manganese(II) chloride	7773–01–5
MnCl_{2}•4H_{2}O	manganese(II) chloride tetrahydrate	13446–34–9
MnCl_{3}	manganese(III) chloride	14690–66–5
MnF_{2}	manganese(II) fluoride	7782–64–1
MnF_{3}	manganese(III) fluoride	7783–53–1
MnF_{4}	manganese(IV) fluoride	15195–58–1
MnI_{2}	manganese(II) iodide	7790–33–2
MnI_{2}•4H_{2}O	manganese(II) iodide tetrahydrate	98716–23–5
Mn(NO_{3})_{2}	manganese(II) nitrate	10377–66–9
MnO	manganese(II) oxide	1344–43–0
MnO_{2}	manganese(IV) oxide	1313–13–9
MnS	manganese(II) sulfide	18820–29–6
MnSO_{4}	manganese(II) sulfate	10034–96–5
MnSb	manganese(III) antimonide	12032–82–5
MnSe	manganese(II) selenide	1313–22–0
MnSe_{2}	manganese(IV) selenide	12299–98–8
MnTe	manganese(II) telluride	12032–88–1
MnTe_{2}	manganese(IV) telluride	12032–89–2
Mn_{2}O_{3}	manganese(III) oxide	1317–34–6
Mn_{2}O_{7}	manganese(VII) oxide	12057–92–0
Mn_{3}O_{4}	manganese(II,III) oxide	1317–35–7
Mn_{3}(PO_{4})_{2}	manganese(II) phosphate	14154–09–7
MoBr_{2}	molybdenum(II) bromide	13446–56–5
MoBr_{3}	molybdenum(III) bromide	13446–57–6
MoBr_{4}	molybdenum(IV) bromide	13520–59–7
MoC_{6}O_{6}	molybdenum(III) hexacarbonyl	13939–06–5
MoCl_{2}	molybdenum(II) chloride	13478–17–6
MoCl_{3}	molybdenum(III) chloride	13478–18–7
MoCl_{4}	molybdenum(IV) chloride	13478–18–7
MoCl_{5}	molybdenum(V) chloride	10241–05–1
MoCl_{6}	molybdenum(VI) chloride	13706–19–9
MoF_{3}	molybdenum(III) fluoride	20193–58–2
MoF_{4}	molybdenum(IV) fluoride	23412–45–5
MoF_{5}	molybdenum(V) fluoride	13819–84–6
MoF_{6}	molybdenum(VI) fluoride	7783–77–9
MoI_{2}	molybdenum(II) iodide	14055–74–4
MoI_{3}	molybdenum(III) iodide	14055–75–5
MoI_{4}	molybdenum(IV) iodide	14055–76–6
MoN	molybdenum(III) nitride	12033–19–1
MoO	molybdenum(II) oxide	12058–07–0
MoO_{2}	molybdenum(IV) oxide	18868–43–4
MoO_{3}	molybdenum(VI) oxide	1313–27–5
MoS_{2}	molybdenum(IV) sulfide	1317–33–5
MoSe_{2}	molybdenum(IV) selenide	12058–18–3
MoSi_{2}	molybdenum(IV) silicide	12136–78–6
MoTe_{2}	molybdenum(IV) telluride	12058–20–7
Mo_{2}O_{3}	molybdenum(III) oxide	1313–29–7
Mo_{2}O_{5}	molybdenum(V) oxide	12163–73–4
Mo_{2}S_{3}	molybdenum(III) sulfide	12033–33–9

== N ==
Chemical formula	Synonyms	CAS number
NBr_{3}	nitrogen tribromide	15162–90–0
NCl_{3}	nitrogen trichloride	10025–85–1
NF_{3}	nitrogen trifluoride	7783–54–2
NH_{3}	ammonia	7664–41–7
NH_{4}Cl	ammonium chloride	12125–02–9
NH_{4}HCO_{3}	ammonium bicarbonate	1066–33–7
NH_{4}NO_{3}	ammonium nitrate	6484–52–2
NH_{4}OH	ammonium hydroxide	1336–21–6
(NH_{4})_{2}SO_{4}	ammonium sulfate	7783–20–2
NI_{3}	nitrogen triiodide	13444–85–4
NO	nitrogen monoxide	10102–43–9
NO_{2}	nitrogen dioxide	10102–44–0
N_{2}	nitrogen	7727-37-9
N_{2}F_{2}	dinitrogen difluoride	13812–43–6
N_{2}F_{4}	dinitrogen tetrafluoride	10036–47–2
N_{2}O	dinitrogen monoxide	10024–97–2
N_{2}O_{3}	dinitrogen trioxide	10544–73–7
N_{2}O_{4}	dinitrogen tetroxide	10544–72–6
N_{2}O_{5}	dinitrogen pentoxide	10102–03–1
NaAlCl_{4}	sodium tetracholoraluminate	7784–16–9
NaAlF_{4}	sodium tetrafluoroaluminate	13821–15–3
NaAlO_{2}	sodium aluminate	1302–42–7
NaAsO_{2}	sodium arsenite	7784–46–5
NaB(C_{6}H_{5})_{4}	sodium tetraphenylborate	143–66–8
NaBF_{4}	sodium borofluoride	13755–29–8
NaBH_{3}CN	sodium cyanoborohydride	25895–60–7
NaBH_{4}	sodium borohydride	16940–66–2
NaBiO_{3}	sodium bismuthate	12232–99–4
NaBr	sodium bromide	7647–15–6
NaBrO_{3}	sodium bromate	7789–38–0
NaCN	sodium cyanide	143–33–9
NaCNO	sodium cyanate	917–61–3
NaCHO_{2}	sodium formate	141–53–7
NaCH_{3}O	sodium methoxide	124–41–4
NaCH_{3}SO_{3}	sodium formaldehydesulfoxylate	149–44–0
NaC_{2}H_{3}FO_{2}	sodium monofluoroacetate	62–74–8
NaC_{2}H_{3}O_{2}	sodium acetate	127–09–3
NaC_{2}H_{3}SO_{3}	sodium ethenesulfonate	3039–83–6
NaC_{2}H_{5}O	sodium ethoxide	141–52–6
NaC_{3}H_{3}O_{2}	sodium acrylate	7446–81–3
NaC_{3}H_{5}O_{2}	sodium propionate	137–40–6
NaC_{3}H_{5}O_{3}	sodium lactate	312–85–6
NaC_{3}H_{6}NO_{3}	sodium hydromethylglycinate	70161–44–3
NaC_{4}H_{7}O_{4}	sodium diacetate	126–96–5
NaC_{6}H_{6}SO_{3}	sodium benzosulfonate	515–42–4
NaC_{7}H_{5}O_{2}	sodium benzoate	532–32–1
NaC_{7}H_{8}SO_{3}	sodium tosylate	657–84–1
NaC_{8}H_{7}O_{2}	sodium phenylacetate	114–70–5
NaC_{8}H_{9}SO_{3}	sodium xylenesulfonate	1300–72–7
NaC_{8}H_{15}O_{2}	sodium caprylate	1984–06–1
NaC_{18}H_{36}O_{2}	sodium stearate	822–16–2
NaCl	sodium chloride	7647–14–5
NaClO	sodium hypochlorite	7681–52–9
NaClO_{2}	sodium chlorite	7758–19–2
NaClO_{3}	sodium chlorate	7775–09–9
NaClO_{4}	sodium perchlorate	7601–89–0
NaF	sodium fluoride	7681–49–4
NaH	sodium hydride	7646–69–7
NaHCO_{3}	sodium bicarbonate	144–55–8
NaHF_{2}	sodium bifluoride	1333–83–1
NaHS	sodium bisulfide	16721–80–5
NaHSO_{3}	sodium bisulfite	7631–90–5
NaI	sodium iodide	7681–82–5
NaIO_{3}	sodium iodate	7681–55–2
NaIO_{4}	sodium periodate	7790–28–5
NaNH_{2}	sodium amide	7782–92–5
NaNO_{2}	sodium nitrite	7632–00–0
NaNO_{3}	sodium nitrate	7631–99–4
NaN_{3}	sodium azide	26628–22–8
NaNbO_{3}	sodium niobate	12034–09–2
NaOH	sodium hydroxide	1310–73–2
NaO_{2}	sodium superoxide	12034–12–7
NaPF_{6}	sodium hexafluorophosphate	21324–39–0
NaPO_{3}	sodium polyphosphate	50813–16–6
(NaPO_{3})_{6}	sodium hexametaphosphate	10124–56–8
NaReO_{4}	sodium perrhenate	13472–33–8
NaSCN	sodium thiocyanate	540–72–7
NaSbO_{3}	sodium antimonate	15432–85–6
NaVO_{3}	sodium metavanadate	13718–26–8
Na_{2}B_{4}O_{7}	sodium tetraborate	1330–43–4
Na_{2}CO_{3}	sodium carbonate	497–19–8
Na_{2}C_{3}H_{2}O_{4}	sodium malonate	141–95–7
Na_{2}C_{4}H_{6}O_{6}	sodium tartrate	6106–24–7
Na_{2}C_{6}H_{8}O_{4}	sodium adipate	7486–38–6
Na_{2}CrO_{4}	sodium chromate	7775–11–3
Na_{2}FPO_{3}	sodium fluorophosphate	10163–15–2
Na_{2}H_{2}S_{2}O_{6}	sodium dithionate	7631–94–9
Na_{2}MoO_{4}	sodium molybdate	7631–95–0
Na_{2}O	sodium oxide	1313–59–3
Na_{2}O_{2}	sodium peroxide	1313–60–6
Na_{2}S	sodium sulfide	1313–82–2
Na_{2}S•5H_{2}O	sodium sulfide pentahydrate	1313–83–3
Na_{2}S•9H_{2}O	sodium sulfide nonahydrate	1313–84–4
Na_{2}SO_{3}	sodium sulfite	7757–83–7
Na_{2}SO_{4}	sodium sulfate	7757–82–6
Na_{2}S_{2}O_{3}	sodium thiosulfate	7772–98–7
Na_{2}S_{2}O_{4}	sodium dithionite	7775–14–6
Na_{2}S_{2}O_{5}	sodium metabisulfite	7681–57–4
Na_{2}S_{2}O_{7}	sodium pyrosulfate	13870–29–6
Na_{2}S_{2}O_{8}	sodium persulfate	7775–27–1
Na_{2}Se	sodium selenide	1313–85–5
Na_{2}SeO_{3}	sodium selenite	10102–18–8
Na_{2}SeO_{4}	sodium selenate	13410–01–0
Na_{2}SiF_{6}	sodium fluorosilicate	16893–85–9
Na_{2}SiO_{3}	sodium silicate	6834–92–0
Na_{2}SnO_{3}	sodium stannate	12058–66–1
Na_{2}Te	sodium telluride	12034–41–2
Na_{2}Ti_{3}O_{7}	sodium metatitanate	12034–36–5
Na_{2}WO_{4}	sodium tungstate	13472–45–2
Na_{3}AlF_{6}	sodium hexafluoroaluminate	13775–53–6
Na_{3}Co(NO_{2})_{6}	sodium cobaltnitrite	14649–73–1
Na_{3}PO_{4}	sodium phosphate	7601–54–9
Na_{3}Sb	sodium antimonide	12058–86–5
Na_{3}SbS_{4}	sodium thioantimonide	13776–84–6
Na_{3}VO_{4}	sodium vanadate	13721–39–6
Na_{4}C_{4}H_{4}O_{6}	sodium tartrate	868–18–8
Na_{4}FeC_{6}N_{6}	sodium ferrocyanide	13601–19–9
Na_{4}P_{2}O_{7}	sodium pyrophosphate	7722–88–5
Na_{4}SiO_{4}	sodium orthosilicate	1344–09–8
Na_{5}P_{3}O_{10}	sodium tripolyphosphate	7758–29–4
NbBr_{3}	niobium(III) bromide	15752–41–7
NbBr_{4}	niobium(IV) bromide	13842–75–6
NbBr_{5}	niobium(V) bromide	13478–45–0
NbC	niobium(IV) carbide	12069–94–2
NbCl_{3}	niobium(III) chloride	13569–59–0
NbCl_{4}	niobium(IV) chloride	13569–70–5
NbCl_{5}	niobium(V) chloride	10026–12–7
NbF_{3}	niobium(III) fluoride	15195–53–6
NbF_{4}	niobium(IV) fluoride	13842–88–1
(NbF_{5})_{4}	niobium(V) fluoride	7783–68–8
NbI_{3}	niobium(III) iodide	13870–20–7
NbI_{4}	niobium(IV) iodide	13870–21–8
NbI_{5}	niobium(V) iodide	13779–92–5
NbN	niobium(III) nitride	24621–21–4
NbO	niobium(II) oxide	12034–57–0
NbO_{2}	niobium(IV) oxide	12034–59–2
NbS_{2}	niobium(IV) sulfide	12136–97–9
NbSe_{2}	niobium(IV) selenide	12034–77–4
NbSe_{3}	niobium(VI) selenide	12034–78–5
NbTe_{2}	niobium(IV) telluride	12034–83–2
Nb_{2}O_{5}	niobium(V) oxide	1313–96–8
Nd(CH_{3}COO)_{3}	neodymium acetate	6192–13–8
NdBr_{2}	neodymium(II) bromide	59325–04–1
NdBr_{3}	neodymium(III) bromide	13536–80–6
Nd(CHO_{2})_{3}	neodymium(III) formate	3252–53–7
NdCl_{2}	neodymium(II) chloride	25469–93–6
NdCl_{3}	neodymium(III) chloride	10024–93–8
NdF_{3}	neodymium(III) fluoride	13709–42–7
NdGaO_{3}	neodymium(III) gallate	12207–22–6
NdI_{2}	neodymium(II) iodide	61393–36–0
NdI_{3}	neodymium(III) iodide	13813–24–6
NdN	neodymium(III) nitride	25764–11–8
Nd(NO_{3})_{3}	neodymium(III) nitrate	10045–95–1
NdS	neodymium(II) sulfide	12035–22–2
NdSe	neodymium(II) selenide	12035–24–4
NdTe	neodymium(II) telluride	12060–53–6
NdVO_{4}	neodymium(III) vanadate	13721–46–5
Nd_{2}O_{3}	neodymium(III) oxide	1313–97–9
Nd_{2}S_{3}	neodymium(III) sulfide	12035–32–4
Nd_{2}Te_{3}	neodymium(III) telluride	12035–35–7
NiAs	nickel(II) arsenide	27016–75–7
Ni(BF_{4})_{2}	nickel(II) fluoroborate	14708–14–6
NiBr_{2}	nickel(II) bromide	13462–88–9
Ni(CN)_{2}	nickel(II) cyanide	557–19–7
NiCO_{3}	nickel(II) carbonate	3333–67–3
Ni(CO)_{4}	nickel(II) carbonyl	13463–39–3
Ni(C_{2}H_{3}O_{2})_{2}	nickel(II) acetate	373–02–4
NiCl_{2}	nickel(II) chloride	7718–54–9
NiCl_{2}•6H_{2}O	nickel(II) chloride hexahydrate	7791–20–0
NiCrO_{4}	nickel(II) chromate	14721–18–7
NiF_{2}	nickel(II) fluoride	10028–18–9
NiI_{2}	nickel(II) iodide	13462–90–3
Ni(NO_{3})_{2}	nickel(II) nitrate	13138–45–9
NiO	nickel(II) oxide	1313–99–1
Ni(OH)_{2}	nickel(II) hydroxide	12054–48–7
NiS	nickel(II) sulfide	16812–54–7
NiSO_{4}	nickel(II) sulfate	7786–81–4
NiSb	nickel(II) antimonide	12035–52–8
NiSe	nickel(II) selenide	1314–05–2
NiSnO_{3}	nickel(II) stannate	12035–38–0
NiTe	nickel(II) telluride	12142–88–0
NiTiO_{3}	nickel(II) titanate	12035–39–1
NiWO_{4}	nickel(II) tungstate	14177–51–6
NiZrO_{3}	nickel(II) zirconate	70692–93–2
Ni_{2}B	nickel(III) boride	12007–01–1
Ni_{2}O_{3}	nickel(III) oxide	1314–06–3
Ni_{3}B	nickel(II) boride	12007–02–2
Ni_{3}S_{2}	nickel(III) sulfide	12035–72–2
NpBr_{3}	neptunium(III) bromide	20730–39–6
NpBr_{4}	neptunium(IV) bromide	15608–32–9
NpCl_{3}	neptunium(III) chloride	20737–06–8
NpCl_{4}	neptunium(IV) chloride	15597–84–9
NpF_{3}	neptunium(III) fluoride	16852–37–2
NpF_{4}	neptunium(IV) fluoride	14529–88–5
NpF_{5}	neptunium(V) fluoride	31479–18–2
NpF_{6}	neptunium(VI) fluoride	14521–05–2
NpI_{3}	neptunium(III) iodide	37501–52–3
NpN	neptunium(III) nitride	12058–90–1
NpO	neptunium(II) oxide	12202–03–8
NpO_{2}	neptunium(IV) oxide	12035–79–9
Np_{2}O_{5}	neptunium(V) oxide	121433–01–0
Np_{2}S_{3}	neptunium(III) sulfide	12281–24–2

== O ==
Chemical formula	Synonyms	CAS number
OF_{2}	oxygen(II) fluoride	7783–41–7
O_{2}F_{2}	oxygen(I) fluoride	7783–44–0
OsBr_{3}	osmium(III) bromide	59201–51–3
OsBr_{4}	osmium(IV) bromide	59201–52–4
Os(C_{5}H_{5})_{2}	osmium(II) cyclopentadienide	1273–81–0
OsCl_{3}	osmium(III) chloride	13444–93–4
OsCl_{3}•3H_{2}O	osmium(III) chloride trihydrate	114268–63–2
OsCl_{4}	osmium(IV) chloride	10026–01–4
OsCl_{5}	osmium(V) chloride	71328–74–0
OsF_{4}	osmium(IV) fluoride	54120–05–7
(OsF_{5})_{4}	osmium(V) fluoride	31576–40–6
OsF_{6}	osmium(VI) fluoride	13768–38–2
OsF_{7}	osmium(VII) fluoride	16949–69–2
OsF_{8}	osmium(VIII) fluoride	18432–81–0
OsI	osmium(I) iodide	76758–38–8
OsI_{2}	osmium(II) iodide	59201–57–9
OsI_{3}	osmium(III) iodide	59201–58–0
OsO_{2}	osmium(IV) oxide	12036–02–1
OsO_{4}	osmium(VIII) oxide	20816–12–0
OsS_{2}	osmium(IV) sulfide	12137–61–0
OsSe_{2}	osmium(IV) selenide	12310–19–9
OsTe_{2}	osmium(IV) telluride	12166–21–1

== P ==
Chemical formula	Synonyms	CAS number
PBr_{3}	phosphorus tribromide	7789–60–8
PBr_{5}	phosphorus pentabromide	7789–69–7
PCl_{3}	phosphorus trichloride	7719–12–2
PCl_{5}	phosphorus pentachloride	10026–13–8
PF_{3}	phosphorus trifluoride	7783–55–3
PF_{5}	phosphorus pentafluoride	7647–19–0
PH_{3}	phosphorus trihydride	7803–51–2
PI_{3}	phosphorus triiodide	13455–01–1
POBr_{3}	phosphorus oxybromide	7789–59–5
POCl_{3}	phosphorus oxychloride	10025–87–3
PSCl_{3}	phosphorus thiochloride	3982–91–0
P_{2}Br_{4}	phosphorus tetrabromide	24856–99–3
P_{2}Cl_{4}	phosphorus tetrachloride	13497–91–1
P_{2}F_{4}	phosphorus tetrafluoride	13824–74–3
P_{2}H_{4}	phosphorus tetrahydride	13445–50–6
P_{2}I_{4}	phosphorus tetraiodide	13455–00–0
P_{2}O_{5}	phosphorus pentoxide	1314–56–3
P_{4}O_{6}	phosphorus hexoxide	12440–00–5
P_{4}O_{10}	phosphorus decaoxide	16752–60–6
P_{4}S_{3}	phosphorus trisulfide	1314–51–8
P_{4}S_{4}	phosphorus tetrasulfide	39350–99–7
P_{4}S_{6}	phosphorus hexasulfide	131105–01–6
P_{4}S_{7}	phosphorus heptasulfide	15578–16–2
P_{4}S_{9}	phosphorus nonasulfide	25070–46–6
P_{4}S_{10}	phosphorus pentasulfide	1314–80–3
P_{4}Se_{3}	phosphorus triselenide	1314–86–9
PaBr_{4}	protactinium(IV) bromide	13867–42–0
PaBr_{5}	protactinium(V) bromide	15608–38–5
PaCl_{4}	protactinium(IV) chloride	13867–41–9
PaCl_{5}	protactinium(V) chloride	13760–41–3
PaF_{4}	protactinium(IV) fluoride	13842–89–2
PaF_{5}	protactinium(V) fluoride	15192–29–7
PaI_{3}	protactinium(III) iodide	19415–71–5
PaI_{4}	protactinium(IV) iodide	15513–96–9
PaI_{5}	protactinium(V) iodide	17497–66–4
PaO	protactinium(II) oxide	60936–60–9
PaO_{2}	protactinium(IV) oxide	12036–03–2
Pa_{2}O_{5}	protactinium(V) oxide	12036–75–8
Pb(AsO_{4})_{2}	lead(II) arsenite	10031–13–7
Pb(BF_{4})_{2}	lead(II) fluoroborate	13814–96–5
PbBr_{2}	lead(II) bromide	10031–22–8
PbBr_{4}	lead(IV) bromide	13701–91–2
Pb(CHO_{2})_{2}	lead(II) formate	811–54–1
Pb(CN)_{2}	lead(II) cyanide	592–05–2
PbCO_{3}	lead(II) carbonate	598–63–0
Pb(C_{2}H_{3}O_{2})_{2}	lead(II) acetate	301–04–2
Pb(C_{2}H_{3}O_{2})_{2}	lead(III) acetate	546–67–8
PbC_{2}O_{4}	lead(II) oxalate	814–93–7
Pb(C_{3}H_{5}O_{2})_{2}	lead(II) lactate	18917–82–3
Pb(C_{4}H_{7}O_{2})_{2}	lead(II) butanoate	819–73–8
Pb(C_{18}H_{33}O_{2})_{2}	lead(II) oleate	1120–46–3
Pb(C_{18}H_{35}O_{2})_{2}	lead(II) stearate	1072–35–1
Pb(ClO_{3})_{2}	lead(II) chlorate	10294–47–0
Pb(ClO_{4})_{2}	lead(II) perchlorate	13453–62–8
PbCl_{2}	lead(II) chloride	7758–95–4
PbCl_{4}	lead(IV) chloride	13463–30–4
PbCrO_{4}	lead(II) chromate	7758–97–6
PbF_{2}	lead(II) fluoride	7783–46–2
PbF_{4}	lead(IV) fluoride	7783–59–7
Pb(H_{2}PO_{2})_{2}	lead(II) hypophosphite	10294–58–3
PbH_{4}	lead(IV) hydride	15875–18–0
Pb(IO_{3})_{2}	lead(II) iodate	25659–31–8
PbI_{2}	lead(II) iodide	10101–63–0
PbMoO_{4}	lead(II) molybdate	10190–55–3
Pb(NO_{3})_{2}	lead(II) nitrate	10099–74–8
Pb(NbO_{3})_{2}	lead(II) niobate	12034–88–7
PbO	lead(II) oxide	1317–36–8
Pb(OH)_{2}	lead(II) hydroxide	19783–14–3
PbO_{2}	lead(IV) oxide	1309–60–0
PbS	lead(II) sulfide	1314–87–0
Pb(SCN)_{2}	lead(II) thiocyanate	592–87–0
PbSO_{3}	lead(II) sulfite	7446–10–8
PbSO_{4}	lead(II) sulfate	7446–14–2
PbSe	lead(II) selenide	12069–00–0
PbSeO_{3}	lead(II) selenite	7488–51–9
PbSeO_{4}	lead(II) selenate	7446–15–3
PbSiO_{3}	lead(II) metasilicate	10099–76–0
PbTa_{2}O_{6}	lead(II) tantalate	12065–68–8
PbTe	lead(II) telluride	1314–91–6
PbTiO_{4}	lead(II) titanate	12060–00–3
Pb(VO_{3})_{2}	lead(II) metavandate	10099–79–3
PbWO_{4}	lead(II) tungstate	7759–01–5
PbZrO_{3}	lead(II) zirconate	12060–01–4
Pb_{2}O_{3}	lead(II,IV) oxide	1314–27–8
Pb_{2}SiO_{4}	lead(II) orthosilicate	13566–17–1
Pb_{3}(AsO_{4})_{2}	lead(II) arsenate	3687–31–8
Pb_{3}(N_{3})_{2}	lead(II) azide	13424–46–9
Pb_{3}O_{4}	lead(II,II,IV) oxide	1314–41–6
Pb_{3}(PO_{4})_{2}	lead(II) phosphate	7446–27–7
Pb_{3}(SbO_{4})_{2}	lead(II) antimonate	13510–89–9
PdBr_{2}	palladium(II) bromide	13444–94–5
Pd(CN)_{2}	palladium(II) cyanide	2035–66–7
Pd(C_{2}F_{3}O_{2})_{2}	palladium(II) trifluoroacetate	42196–31–6
Pd(C_{2}H_{3}O_{2})_{2}	palladium(II) acetate	3375–31–3
PdCl_{2}	palladium(II) chloride	7647–10–1
PdF_{2}	palladium(II) fluoride	13444–96–7
PdF_{4}	palladium(IV) fluoride	13709–55–2
PdI_{2}	palladium(II) iodide	7790–38–7
Pd(NO_{3})_{2}	palladium(II) nitrate	10102–05–3
PdO	palladium(II) oxide	1314–08–5
PdO_{2}	palladium(IV) oxide	12036–04–3
PdS	palladium(II) sulfide	12125–22–3
PdSO_{4}	palladium(II) sulfate	13566–03–5
PdS_{2}	palladium disulfide	12137–75–6
PdSe	palladium(II) selenide	12137–76–7
PdSe_{2}	palladium(IV) selenide	60672–19–7
PdTe	palladium(II) telluride	12037–94–4
PdTe_{2}	palladium(IV) telluride	12037–95–5
PmBr_{3}	promethium(III) bromide	14325–78–1
PmCl_{3}	promethium(III) chloride	13779–10–7
Pm_{2}O_{3}	promethium(III) oxide	12036–32–7
PrBr_{3}	praseodymium(III) bromide	13536–53–3
Pr(CHO_{2})_{3}	praseodymium(III) formate	3252–52–6
PrCl_{3}	praseodymium(III) chloride	10361–79–2
PrF_{2}	praseodymium(II) fluoride	59513–11–0
PrF_{3}	praseodymium(III) fluoride	13709–46–1
PrF_{4}	praseodymium(IV) fluoride	15192–24–2
PrI_{2}	praseodymium(II) iodide	65530–47–4
PrI_{3}	praseodymium(III) iodide	13813–23–5
PrN	praseodymium(III) nitride	25764–09–4
PrO_{2}	praseodymium(IV) oxide	12036–05–4
PrS	praseodymium(II) sulfide	12038–06–1
PrSe	praseodymium(II) selenide	12038–08–3
PrTe	praseodymium(II) telluride	12125–60–9
Pr_{2}O_{3}	praseodymium(III) oxide	12036–32–7
Pr_{2}S_{3}	praseodymium(III) sulfide	12038–13–0
Pr_{2}Te_{3}	praseodymium(III) telluride	12038–12–9
PtBr_{2}	platinum(II) bromide	13455–12–4
PtBr_{3}	platinum(III) bromide	25985–07–3
PtBr_{4}	platinum(IV) bromide	68938–92–1
Pt(CN)_{2}	platinum(II) cyanide	592–06–3
PtCl_{2}	platinum(II) chloride	10025–65–7
PtCl_{3}	platinum(III) chloride	25909–39–1
PtCl_{4}	platinum(IV) chloride	13454–96–1
PtCl_{4}•5H_{2}O	platinum(IV) chloride pentahydrate	15869–63–3
PtF_{4}	platinum(IV) fluoride	13455–15–7
PtF_{5}	platinum(V) fluoride	13782–84–8
PtF_{6}	platinum(VI) fluoride	13693–05–5
PtI_{2}	platinum(II) iodide	7790–39–8
PtI_{3}	platinum(III) iodide	68220–29–1
PtI_{4}	platinum(IV) iodide	7790–46–7
PtO	platinum(II) oxide	12035–82–4
PtO_{2}	platinum(IV) oxide	1314–15–4
PtO_{2}•H_{2}O	platinum(IV) oxide monohydrate	12137–21–2
PtS	platinum(II) sulfide	12038–20–9
PtS_{2}	platinum(IV) sulfide	12038–21–0
PtSe_{2}	platinum(IV) selenide	12038–26–5
PtTe	platinum(II) telluride	12166–00–6
PtTe_{2}	platinum(IV) telluride	12038–29–8
Pt_{6}Cl_{12}	platinum(II) chloride	10025–65–7
PuBr_{3}	plutonium(III) bromide	15752–46–2
PuCl_{3}	plutonium(III) chloride	13569–62–5
PuF_{3}	plutonium(III) fluoride	13842–83–6
PuF_{4}	plutonium(IV) fluoride	13709–56–3
PuF_{6}	plutonium(VI) fluoride	13693–06–6
PuH_{2}	plutonium(II) hydride	17336–52–6
PuH_{3}	plutonium(III) hydride	15457–77–9
PuI_{3}	plutonium(III) iodide	13813–46–2
PuN	plutonium(III) nitride	12033–54–4
PuO	plutonium(II) oxide	12035–83–5
PuO_{2}	plutonium(IV) oxide	12059–95–9
PuS	plutonium(II) sulfide	12038–51–6
PuS_{2}	plutonium(IV) sulfide	12038–56–1
PuSe	plutonium(II) selenide	23299–88–9
Pu_{2}O_{3}	plutonium(III) oxide	12036–34–9

== R ==
Chemical formula	Synonyms	CAS number
RaBr_{2}	radium bromide	10031–23–9
RaCO_{3}	radium carbonate	7116–98–5
RaCl_{2}	radium chloride	10025–66–8
RaF_{2}	radium fluoride	20610–49–5
RaI_{2}	radium iodide	20610–52–0
RaNO_{3}	radium nitrate	10213–12–4
RaO	radium oxide	12143–02–1
Ra(OH)_{2}	radium hydroxide	98966–86–0
RaSO_{4}	radium sulfate	7446–16–4
RbAlCl_{4}	rubidium tetrachloroaluminate	17992–02–8
RbAlF_{4}	rubidium tetrafluoroaluminate	14484–70–9
RbBr	rubidium bromide	7789–39–1
RbC_{2}H_{3}O_{2}	rubidium acetate	563–67–7
RbC_{5}H_{7}O_{2}	rubidium acetylacetonate	66169–93–5
RbCl	rubidium chloride	7791–11–9
RbF	rubidium fluoride	13446–74–7
RbH	rubidium hydride	13446–75–8
RbI	rubidium iodide	7790–29–6
RbIO_{3}	rubidium iodate	13446–76–9
RbIO_{4}	rubidium periodate	13465–48–0
RbNO_{3}	rubidium nitrate	13126–12–0
RbOH	rubidium hydroxide	1310–82–3
RbO_{2}	rubidium superoxide	12137–25–6
Rb_{2}O	rubidium oxide	18088–11–4
Rb_{2}O_{2}	rubidium peroxide	23611–30–5
Rb_{2}S	rubidium sulfide	31083–74–6
Rb_{2}Se	rubidium selenide	31052–43–4
Rb_{2}Te	rubidium telluride	12210–70–7
ReBr_{3}	rhenium(III) bromide	13569–49–8
ReBr_{4}	rhenium(IV) bromide	36753–03–4
ReBr_{5}	rhenium(V) bromide	30937–53–2
ReCl_{3}	rhenium(III) chloride	13569–63–6
ReCl_{4}	rhenium(IV) chloride	13569–71–6
ReCl_{5}	rhenium(V) chloride	13596–35–5
ReCl_{6}	rhenium(VI) chloride	31234–26–1
ReF_{4}	rhenium(IV) fluoride	15192–42–4
ReF_{5}	rhenium(V) fluoride	30937–52–1
ReF_{6}	rhenium(VI) fluoride	10049–17–9
ReF_{7}	rhenium(VII) fluoride	17029–21–9
ReI_{3}	rhenium(III) iodide	15622–42–1
ReI_{4}	rhenium(IV) iodide	59301–47–2
ReO_{2}	rhenium(IV) oxide	12036–09–8
ReO_{3}	rhenium(VI) oxide	1314–28–9
ReS_{2}	rhenium(IV) sulfide	12038–63–0
ReTe_{2}	rhenium(IV) telluride	12067–00–4
Re_{2}O_{3}	rhenium(III) oxide	12060–05–8
Re_{2}O_{7}	rhenium(VII) oxide	1314–68–7
Re_{2}S_{7}	rhenium(VII) sulfide	12038–67–4
RhBr_{3}	rhodium(III) bromide	15608–29–4
RhCl_{3}	rhodium(III) chloride	10049–07–7
RhF_{3}	rhodium(III) fluoride	60804–25–3
RhF_{4}	rhodium(IV) fluoride	60617–65–4
RhF_{5}	rhodium(V) fluoride	41517–05–9
RhF_{6}	rhodium(VI) fluoride	13693–07–7
RhI_{3}	rhodium(III) iodide	15492–38–3
Rh(NO_{3})_{3}	rhodium(III) nitrate	13465–43–5
RhO_{2}	rhodium(IV) oxide	12137–27–8
RhS_{2}	rhodium(IV) sulfide	12038–73–2
RhSe_{2}	rhodium(IV) selenide	12038–76–5
RhTe_{2}	rhodium(IV) telluride	12038–80–1
Rh_{2}O_{3}	rhodium(III) oxide	12036–35–0
Rh_{2}(SO_{4})_{3}	rhodium(III) sulfate	10489–46–0
Rh_{2}S_{3}	rhodium(III) sulfide	12067–06–0
Rh_{2}S_{7}	rhodium(VII) sulfide	12038–67–4
RuBr_{2}	ruthenium(II) bromide	59201–36–4
RuBr_{3}	ruthenium(III) bromide	14014–88–1
RuC_{15}H_{21}O_{3}	ruthenium(III) acetylacetonate	22594–69–0
RuCl_{2}	ruthenium(II) chloride	13465–51–5
RuCl_{3}	ruthenium(III) chloride	10049–08–8
RuF_{3}	ruthenium(III) fluoride	51621–05–7
RuF_{4}	ruthenium(IV) fluoride	71500–16–8
RuF_{5}	ruthenium(V) fluoride	14521–18–7
RuF_{6}	ruthenium(VI) fluoride	13693–08–8
RuI_{2}	ruthenium(II) iodide	59201–41–1
RuI_{3}	ruthenium(III) iodide	13896–65–6
RuO_{2}	ruthenium(IV) oxide	12036–10–1
RuO_{4}	ruthenium(VI) oxide	20427–56–9
RuS_{2}	ruthenium(IV) sulfide	12166–20–0
RuSe_{2}	ruthenium(IV) selenide	12166–21–1
RuTe_{2}	ruthenium(IV) telluride	12166–21–1

== S ==
Chemical formula	Synonyms	CAS number
SCl_{2}	sulfur dichloride	10545–99–0
SCl_{4}	sulfur tetrachloride	13451–08–6
SF_{2}	sulfur difluoride	13814–25–0
SF_{4}	sulfur tetrafluoride	7783–60–0
SF_{6}	sulfur hexafluoride	2551–62–4
SO	sulfur monoxide	13827–32–2
SO_{2}	sulfur dioxide	7446–09–5
SO_{3}	sulfur trioxide	7446–11–9
S_{2}Br_{2}	disulfur dibromide	13172–31–1
S_{2}Cl_{2}	disulfur dichloride	10025–67–9
S_{2}F_{4}	disulfur tetrafluoride	10546–01–7
S_{2}F_{10}	disulfur decafluoride	5714–22–7
S_{2}I_{2}	disulfur diiodide	53280–15–2
S_{2}O	disulfur monoxide	20901–21–7
S_{4}N_{4}	tetrasulfur tetranitride	28950–34–7
SbBr_{3}	antimony tribromide	7789–61–9
SbCl_{2}F_{3}	antimony dichlorotrifluoride	7791–16–4
SbCl_{3}	antimony trichloride	10025–91–9
SbCl_{5}	antimony pentachloride	7647–18–9
SbF_{3}	antimony trifluoride	7783–56–4
SbF_{5}	antimony pentafluoride	7783–70–2
SbH_{3}	antimony trihydride	7803–52–3
SbI_{3}	antimony triiodide	7790–44–5
SbN	antimony trinitride	12333–57–2
SbNbO_{4}	antimony orthoniobate	35600–19–2
Sb_{2}O_{3}	antimony trioxide	1309–64–4
Sb_{2}O_{4}	antimony tetroxide	1332–81–6
Sb_{2}O_{5}	antimony pentoxide	1314–60–9
Sb_{2}(SO_{4})_{3}	antimony trisulfate	7446–32–4
Sb_{2}S_{3}	antimony trisulfide	1345–04–6
Sb_{2}S_{5}	antimony pentasulfide	1315–04–4
Sb_{2}Se_{3}	antimony triselenide	1315–05–5
Sb_{2}Te_{3}	antimony tritelluride	1327–50–0
ScBr_{3}	scandium(III) bromide	13465–59–3
Sc(CF_{3}SO_{3})_{3}	scandium(III) trifluoromethanesulfonate	144026–79–9
Sc(CHO_{2})_{3}	scandium(III) formate	23405–01–8
ScCl_{3}	scandium(III) chloride	10361–84–9
ScF_{3}	scandium(III) fluoride	13709–47–2
ScH_{2}	scandium(II) hydride	13598–30–6
ScH_{3}	scandium(III) hydride	43238–07–9
ScI_{3}	scandium(III) iodide	14474–33–0
Sc(NO_{3})_{3}	scandium(III) nitrate	13465–60–6
Sc_{2}O_{3}	scandium(III) oxide	12060–08–1
Sc_{2}S_{3}	scandium(III) sulfide	12166–29–9
Sc_{2}Te_{3}	scandium(III) telluride	12166–44–8
SeBr	selenium bromide	17655–37–7
SeBr_{2}	selenium dibromide	22987–45–7
SeBr_{4}	selenium tetrabromide	7789–65–3
SeCl_{2}	selenium dichloride	14457–70–6
SeCl_{4}	selenium tetrachloride	10026–03–6
SeF_{2}	selenium difluoride	70421–43–1
SeF_{4}	selenium tetrafluoride	13465–66–2
SeF_{6}	selenium hexafluoride	7783–79–1
SeOBr_{2}	selenium oxybromide	7789–51–7
SeOCl_{2}	selenium oxychloride	7791–23–3
SeO_{2}	selenium dioxide	7446–08–4
SeO_{2}F_{2}	selenium dioxydifluoride	14984–81–7
SeO_{3}	selenium trioxide	13768–86–0
SeS	selenium monosulfide	7446–34–6
SeS_{2}	selenium disulfide	7488–56–4
Se_{2}S_{6}	selenium hexasulfide	75926–26–0
SiB_{4}	silicon boride	12007–81–7
SiBr_{4}	silicon bromide	7789–66–4
SiC	silicon carbide	409–21–2
SiCl_{4}	silicon chloride	10026–04–7
SiF_{4}	silicon fluoride	7783–61–1
SiH_{4}	silicon hydride	7803–62–5
SiI_{4}	silicon iodide	13465–84–4
SiO_{2}	silicon dioxide	14808–60–7
SiS_{2}	silicon sulfide	13759–10–9
Si_{3}N_{4}	silicon nitride	12033–89–5
SmBr_{2}	samarium(II) bromide	50801–97–3
SmBr_{3}	samarium(III) bromide	13759–87–0
Sm(CHO_{2})_{3}	samarium(III) formate	3252–54–8
SmCl_{2}	samarium(II) chloride	13874–75–4
SmCl_{3}	samarium(III) chloride	10361–82–7
SmF_{2}	samarium(II) fluoride	15192–17–3
SmF_{3}	samarium(III) fluoride	13765–24–7
SmI_{2}	samarium(II) iodide	32248–43–4
SmI_{3}	samarium(III) iodide	13813–25–7
Sm_{2}O_{3}	samarium(III) oxide	12060–58–1
Sm_{2}S_{3}	samarium(III) sulfide	12067–22–0
Sm_{2}Se_{3}	samarium(III) selenide	12039–56–4
Sm_{2}Te_{3}	samarium(III) telluride	12040–00–5
Sn(BF_{4})_{2}	tin(II) fluoroborate	13814–97–6
SnBr_{2}	tin(II) bromide	10031–24–0
SnBr_{4}	tin(IV) bromide	7789–67–5
SnC_{2}O_{4}	tin(II) oxalate	814–94–8
SnCl_{2}	tin(II) chloride	7772–99–8
SnCl_{4}	tin(IV) chloride	7646–78–8
SnF_{2}	tin(II) fluoride	7783–47–3
SnF_{4}	tin(IV) fluoride	7783–62–2
SnH_{4}	tin(IV) hydride	2406–52–2
SnI_{2}	tin(II) iodide	10294–70–9
SnI_{4}	tin(IV) iodide	7790–47–8
SnO	tin(II) oxide	21651–19–4
SnO_{2}	tin(IV) oxide	18282–10–5
SnS	tin(II) sulfide	1314–95–0
SnSO_{4}	tin(II) sulfate	7488–55–3
SnS_{2}	tin(IV) sulfide	1315–01–1
SnSe	tin(II) selenide	1315–06–6
SnSe_{2}	tin(IV) selenide	20770–09–6
SnTe	tin(II) telluride	12040–02–7
SrAlO_{3}	strontium aluminate	12004–37–4
SrB_{2}O_{4}	strontium metaborate	13703–84–9
SrB_{6}	strontium boride	12046–54–7
SrBr_{2}	strontium bromide	10476–81–0
SrBr_{2}•6H_{2}O	strontium bromide hexahydrate	7789–53–9
Sr(C_{2}H_{3}O_{2})_{2}	strontium acetate	543–94–2
SrCO_{3}	strontium carbonate	1633–05–2
SrCl_{2}	strontium chloride	10476–85–4
SrCrO_{4}	strontium chromate	7789–06–2
SrF_{2}	strontium fluoride	7783–48–4
SrH_{2}	strontium hydride	13598–33–9
SrI_{2}	strontium iodide	10476–86–5
SrMoO_{4}	strontium molybdate	13470–04–7
Sr(NO_{2})_{2}	strontium nitrite	13470–06–9
Sr(NO_{3})_{2}	strontium nitrate	10042–76–9
SrO	strontium oxide	1314–11–0
Sr(OH)_{2}	strontium hydroxide	18480–07–4
SrO_{2}	strontium peroxide	1314–18–7
SrS	strontium sulfide	1314–96–1
SrSCN	strontium thiocyanate	18807–10–8
SrSO_{3}	strontium sulfite	13451–02–0
SrS_{2}O_{6}	strontium dithionate	13845–16–4
SrSe	strontium selenide	1315–07–7
SrSeO_{4}	strontium selenate	7446–21–1
SrSiO_{4}	strontium silicate	12712–63–9
SrSnO_{3}	strontium stannate	12143–34–9
SrTiO_{3}	strontium titanate	12060–59–2
SrWO_{4}	strontium tungstate	13451–05–3
SrZrO_{3}	strontium zirconate	12036–39–4
Sr_{3}P_{2}	strontium phosphide	12504–16–4

== T ==
Chemical formula	Synonyms	CAS number
TaAl_{3}	tantalum(III) aluminide	12004–76–1
TaBr_{3}	tantalum(III) bromide	13842–73–4
TaBr_{4}	tantalum(IV) bromide	13842–76–7
TaBr_{5}	tantalum(V) bromide	13451–11–1
TaC	tantalum(IV) carbide	12070–06–3
TaCl_{3}	tantalum(III) chloride	13569–67–0
TaCl_{4}	tantalum(IV) chloride	13569–72–7
TaCl_{5}	tantalum(V) chloride	7721–01–9
TaF_{3}	tantalum(III) fluoride	13814–17–0
TaF_{5}	tantalum(V) fluoride	7783–71–3
TaI_{4}	tantalum(IV) iodide	14693–80–2
TaI_{5}	tantalum(V) iodide	14693–81–3
TaN	tantalum(III) nitride	12033–62–4
TaO	tantalum(II) oxide	12035–90–4
TaO_{2}	tantalum(IV) oxide	12036–14–5
TaS	tantalum(II) sulfide	41203–00–3
TaS_{2}	tantalum(IV) sulfide	12143–72–5
TaSe_{2}	tantalum(IV) selenide	12039–55–3
TaSi_{2}	tantalum(IV) silicide	12039–79–1
TaTe_{2}	tantalum(IV) telluride	12067–66–2
Ta_{2}H	tantalum hydride	12026–09–4
Ta_{2}O_{5}	tantalum(V) oxide	1314–61–0
TbBr_{3}	terbium(III) bromide	14456–47–4
Tb(CHO_{2})_{3}	terbium(III) formate	3252–57–1
TbCl_{3}	terbium(III) chloride	10042–88–3
TbF_{2}	terbium(II) fluoride	107949–15–5
TbF_{3}	terbium(III) fluoride	13708–63–9
TbF_{4}	terbium(IV) fluoride	36781–15–4
TbI_{3}	terbium(III) iodide	13813–40–6
TbN	terbium(III) nitride	12033–64–6
TbO_{2}	terbium(IV) oxide	12036–15–6
TbSi_{2}	terbium(IV) silicide	12039–80–4
Tb_{2}O_{3}	terbium(III) oxide	12036–41–8
Tb_{2}S_{3}	terbium(III) sulfide	12138–11–3
Tb_{2}Se_{3}	terbium(III) selenide	12166–48–2
TcBr_{4}	technetium(IV) bromide	74078–05–0
TcCl_{4}	technetium(IV) chloride	14215–13–5
TcCl_{6}	technetium(VI) chloride	31227–43–7
TcF_{5}	technetium(V) fluoride	31052–14–9
TcF_{6}	technetium(VI) fluoride	13842–93–8
TcO_{2}	technetium(IV) oxide	12036–16–7
TcS_{2}	technetium(IV) sulfide	34312–50–0
Tc_{2}O_{7}	technetium(VII) oxide	12165–21–8
TeBr_{2}	tellurium dibromide	7789–54–0
TeBr_{4}	tellurium tetrabromide	10031–27–3
TeCl_{2}	tellurium dichloride	10025–71–5
TeCl_{4}	tellurium tetrachloride	10026–07–0
TeF_{4}	tellurium tetrafluoride	15192–26–4
TeF_{6}	tellurium hexafluoride	7783–80–4
TeI	tellurium monoiodide	12600–42–9
TeI_{4}	tellurium tetraiodide	7790–48–9
TeO	tellurium monoxide	13451–17–7
TeO_{2}	tellurium dioxide	7446–07–3
TeO_{3}	tellurium trioxide	13451–18–8
TeS_{2}	tellurium disulfide	7446–35–7
ThBr_{4}	thorium(IV) bromide	13453–49–1
ThC	thorium(IV) carbide	12012–16–7
Th(CO_{3})_{2}	thorium(II) carbonate	19024–62–5
ThCl_{4}	thorium(IV) chloride	10026–08–1
ThF_{3}	thorium(III) fluoride	13842–84–7
ThF_{4}	thorium(IV) fluoride	13709–59–6
ThH_{2}	thorium(II) hydride	16689–88–6
ThI_{2}	thorium(II) iodide	13779–95–8
ThI_{3}	thorium(III) iodide	13779–96–9
ThI_{4}	thorium(IV) iodide	7790–49–0
ThN	thorium(III) nitride	12033–65–7
Th(NO_{3})_{4}	thorium(IV) nitrate	13823–29–5
ThO_{2}	thorium(IV) oxide	1314–20–1
ThS	thorium(II) sulfide	12039–06–4
ThS_{2}	thorium(IV) sulfide	12138–07–7
ThSe_{2}	thorium(IV) selenide	60763–24–8
ThSiO_{4}	thorium(IV) orthosilicate	14553–44–7
ThSi_{2}	thorium(IV) silicide	12067–54–8
Th_{2}S_{3}	thorium(III) sulfide	12286–35–0
TiBr_{2}	titanium(II) bromide	13783–04–5
TiBr_{3}	titanium(III) bromide	13135–31–4
TiBr_{4}	titanium(IV) bromide	7789–68–6
TiC	titanium(IV) carbide	12070–08–5
TiC_{8}H_{20}O_{4}	titanium(IV) ethoxide	3087–36–3
TiCl_{2}	titanium(II) chloride	10049–06–6
TiCl_{3}	titanium(III) chloride	7705–07–9
TiCl_{4}	titanium(IV) chloride	7550–45–0
TiF_{2}	titanium(II) fluoride	13814–20–5
TiF_{3}	titanium(III) fluoride	13470–08–1
TiF_{4}	titanium(IV) fluoride	7783–63–3
TiH_{2}	titanium(II) hydride	7704–98–5
TiI_{2}	titanium(II) iodide	13783–07–8
TiI_{3}	titanium(III) iodide	13783–08–9
TiI_{4}	titanium(IV) iodide	7720–83–4
TiN	titanium(III) nitride	25583–20–4
TiO	titanium(II) oxide	12137–20–1
TiO_{2}	titanium(IV) oxide	13463–67–7
TiP	titanium(III) phosphide	12037–65–9
Ti_{3}(PO_{4})_{4}	titanium(IV) phosphate	15578–51–5
TiS	titanium(II) sulfide	12039–07–5
Ti(SO_{4})_{2}	titanium(IV) sulfate	18130–44–4
TiS_{2}	titanium(IV) sulfide	12039–13–3
TiSi_{2}	titanium(IV) silicide	12039–83–7
Ti_{2}O_{3}	titanium(III) oxide	1344–54–3
Ti_{2}(SO_{4})_{3}	titanium(III) sulfate	10343–61–0
Ti_{2}S_{3}	titanium(III) sulfide	12039–16–6
Ti_{3}O_{5}	titanium(III,IV) oxide	12065–65–5
TlBr	thallium(I) bromide	7789–40–4
TlCHO_{2}	thallium(I) formate	992–98–3
TlCN	thallium(I) cyanide	13453–34–4
TlC_{2}H_{3}O_{2}	thallium(I) acetate	563–68–8
TlC_{2}H_{5}O	thallium(I) ethoxide	20398–06–5
TlCl	thallium(I) chloride	7791–12–0
TlClO_{3}	thallium(I) chlorate	13453–30–0
TlClO_{4}	thallium(I) perchlorate	13453–40–2
TlCl_{2}	thallium(II) chloride	15230–71–4
TlCl_{3}	thallium(III) chloride	13453–32–2
TlF	thallium(I) fluoride	7789–27–7
TlF_{3}	thallium(III) fluoride	7783–57–5
TlI	thallium(I) iodide	7790–30–9
TlIO_{3}	thallium(III) iodate	14767–09–0
TlI_{3}	thallium(I) triiodide	60488–29–1
TlNO_{3}	thallium(I) nitrate	10102–45–1
Tl(NO_{3})_{3}	thallium(III) nitrate	13746–98–0
TlOH	thallium(I) hydroxide	12026–06–1
TlPF_{6}	thallium(I) hexafluorophosphate	60969–19–9
Tl_{2}Br_{4}	thallium(I,III) bromide	13453–28–6
Tl_{2}CO_{3}	thallium(I) carbonate	6533–73–9
Tl_{2}C_{2}O_{4}	thallium(I) oxalate	30737–24–7
Tl_{2}MoO_{4}	thallium(I) molybdate	34128–09–1
Tl_{2}O	thallium(I) oxide	1314–12–1
Tl_{2}O_{3}	thallium(III) oxide	1314–32–5
Tl_{2}S	thallium(I) sulfide	1314–97–2
Tl_{2}SO_{4}	thallium(I) sulfate	7446–18–6
Tl_{2}Se	thallium(I) selenide	15572–25–5
Tl_{2}SeO_{4}	thallium(I) selenate	7446–22–2
Tl_{2}Te	thallium(I) telluride	12040–13–0
TmBr_{2}	thulium(II) bromide	64171–97–7
TmBr_{3}	thulium(III) bromide	14456–51–0
TmCl_{2}	thulium(II) chloride	22852–11–5
TmCl_{2}•7H_{2}O	thulium(II) chloride heptahydrate	13778–39–7
TmCl_{3}	thulium(III) chloride	13537–18–3
TmF_{3}	thulium(III) fluoride	13760–79–7
TmI_{2}	thulium(II) iodide	60864–26–8
TmI_{3}	thulium(III) iodide	13813–43–9
Tm(NbO_{3})_{2}	thulium(II) niobate	97086–52–7
Tm_{2}O_{3}	thulium(III) oxide	12036–44–1
Tm_{2}S_{3}	thulium(III) sulfide	12166–30–2

== U ==
Chemical formula	Synonyms	CAS number
UBr_{3}	uranium(III) bromide	13470–19–4
UBr_{4}	uranium(IV) bromide	13470–20–7
UBr_{5}	uranium(V) bromide	13775–16–1
UC	uranium(IV) carbide	12070–09–6
UC_{2}	uranium(VI) carbide	12071–33–9
UCl_{3}	uranium(III) chloride	10025–93–1
UCl_{4}	uranium(IV) chloride	10026–10–5
UCl_{5}	uranium(V) chloride	13470–21–8
UCl_{6}	uranium(VI) chloride	13763–23–0
UF_{3}	uranium(III) fluoride	13775–06–9
UF_{4}	uranium(IV) fluoride	10049–14–6
UF_{5}	uranium(V) fluoride	13775–07–0
UF_{6}	uranium(VI) fluoride	7783–81–5
UH_{3}	uranium(III) hydride	13598–56–6
UI_{3}	uranium(III) iodide	13775–18–3
UI_{4}	uranium(IV) iodide	13470–22–9
UN	uranium(III) nitride	25658–43–9
UO	uranium(II) oxide	13598–56–6
UO_{2}	uranium(IV) oxide	1344–57–6
UO_{2}(NO_{3})_{2}	uranyl nitrate	10102–06–4
UO_{3}	uranium(VI) oxide	1344–58–7
US	uranium(II) sulfide	12039–11–1
USe_{3}	uranium(VI) selenide	12138–23–7
UTe_{2}	uranium(IV) telluride	12138–37–3
UTe_{3}	uranium(VI) telluride	12040–18–5
U_{2}O_{5}	uranium(V) oxide	12065–66–6
U_{2}S_{3}	uranium(III) sulfide	12138–13–5
U_{3}N_{2}	uranium(II) nitride	12033–85–1
U_{3}O_{8}	uranium(V,VI) oxide	1344–59–8
U_{4}O_{9}	uranium(IV,V) oxide	12037–15–9

== V ==
Chemical formula	Synonyms	CAS number
VBr_{2}	vanadium(II) bromide	14890–41–6
VBr_{3}	vanadium(III) bromide	13470–26–3
VBr_{4}	vanadium(IV) bromide	13595–30–7
VC	vanadium(IV) carbide	12070–10–9
VCl_{2}	vanadium(II) chloride	10580–52–6
VCl_{3}	vanadium(III) chloride	7718–98–1
VCl_{4}	vanadium(IV) chloride	7632–51–1
VF_{2}	vanadium(II) fluoride	13842–80–3
VF_{3}	vanadium(III) fluoride	10049–12–4
VF_{4}	vanadium(IV) fluoride	10049–16–8
VF_{5}	vanadium(V) fluoride	7783–72–4
VH	vanadium(I) hydride	13966–93–3
VI_{2}	vanadium(II) iodide	15513–84–5
VI_{3}	vanadium(III) iodide	15513–94–7
VI_{4}	vanadium(IV) iodide	15831–18–2
VN	vanadium(III) nitride	24646–85–3
VO	vanadium(II) oxide	12035–98–2
VOCl_{3}	vanadium(V) oxytrichloride	7727–18–6
VOF_{3}	vanadium(V) oxytrifluoride	13709–31–4
VO_{2}	vanadium(IV) oxide	12036–21–4
VOSO_{4}	vanadyl sulfate	27774–13–6
VS_{2}	vanadium(IV) sulfide	12166–28–8
VSe_{2}	vanadium(IV) selenide	12299–51–3
VSi_{2}	vanadium(IV) silicide	12039–87–1
VTe_{2}	vanadium(IV) telluride	35515–91–4
V_{2}O_{3}	vanadium(III) oxide	1314–34–7
V_{2}O_{5}	vanadium(V) oxide	1314–62–1
V_{2}(SO_{4})_{3}	vanadium(III) sulfate	13701–70–7
V_{2}S_{3}	vanadium(III) sulfide	1315–03–3
V_{3}Si	vanadium(II) silicide	12039–76–8

== W ==
Chemical formula	Synonyms	CAS number
WBr_{2}	tungsten(II) bromide	13470–10–5
WBr_{3}	tungsten(III) bromide	15163–24–3
WBr_{4}	tungsten(IV) bromide	14055–81–3
WBr_{5}	tungsten(V) bromide	13470–11–6
WBr_{6}	tungsten(VI) bromide	13701–86–5
WC	tungsten(IV) carbide	12070–12–1
WCl_{2}	tungsten(II) chloride	13470–12–7
WCl_{3}	tungsten(III) chloride	20193–56–0
WCl_{4}	tungsten(IV) chloride	13470–13–8
WCl_{5}	tungsten(V) chloride	13470–14–9
WCl_{6}	tungsten(VI) chloride	13283–01–7
WF_{4}	tungsten(IV) fluoride	13766–47–7
WF_{5}	tungsten(V) fluoride	19357–83–6
WF_{6}	tungsten(VI) fluoride	7783–82–6
WI_{2}	tungsten(II) iodide	13470–17–2
WI_{3}	tungsten(III) iodide	15513–69–6
WI_{4}	tungsten(IV) iodide	14055–84–6
WOBr_{3}	tungsten(V) oxytribromide	20213–56–3
WOBr_{4}	tungsten(VI) oxytetrabromide	13520–77–9
WOCl_{3}	tungsten(V) oxytrichloride	14249–98–0
WOCl_{4}	tungsten(VI) oxytetrachloride	13520–78–0
WOF_{4}	tungsten(VI) oxytetrafluoride	13520–79–1
WO_{2}	tungsten(IV) oxide	12036–22–5
WO_{2}Br_{2}	tungsten(VI) dioxydibromide	13520–75–7
WO_{2}Cl_{2}	tungsten(VI) dioxydichloride	13520–76–8
WO_{2}I_{2}	tungsten(VI) dioxydiiodide	14447–89–3
WO_{3}	tungsten(VI) oxide	1314–35–8
WS_{2}	tungsten(IV) sulfide	12138–09–9
WS_{3}	tungsten(VI) sulfide	12125–19–8
WSe_{2}	tungsten(IV) selenide	12067–46–8
WSi_{2}	tungsten(IV) silicide	12039–88–2
WTe_{2}	tungsten(IV) telluride	12067–76–4

== X ==
Chemical formula	Synonyms	CAS number
XeF	xenon monofluoride	16757–14–5
XeF_{2}	xenon difluoride	13709–36–9
XeF_{4}	xenon tetrafluoride	13709–61–0
XeF_{6}	xenon hexafluoride	13693–09–9
XeOF_{4}	xenon oxytetrafluoride	13774–85–1
XeO_{2}F_{2}	xenon dioxydifluoride	13875–06–4
XeO_{3}	xenon trioxide	13776–58–4
XeO_{4}	xenon tetroxide	12340–14–6

== Y ==
Chemical formula	Synonyms	CAS number
YAs	yttrium(III) arsenide	12255–48–0
YB_{6}	yttrium(III) boride	12008–32–1
YBr_{3}	yttrium(III) bromide	13469–98–2
Y(CHO_{2})_{3}	yttrium(III) formate	15331–71–2
YC_{2}	yttrium(II) carbide	12071–35–1
Y(CF_{3}SO_{3})_{3}	yttrium(III) trifluoromethanesulfonate	52093–30–8
YCl_{3}	yttrium(III) chloride	10361–92–9
YF_{3}	yttrium(III) fluoride	13709–49–4
YH_{2}	yttrium(II) hydride	13598–35–1
YH_{3}	yttrium(III) hydride	13598–57–7
YI_{3}	yttrium(III) iodide	13470–38–7
YN	yttrium(III) nitride	25764–13–0
YP	yttrium(III) phosphide	12294–01–8
YSb	yttrium(III) antimonide	12186–97–9
YVO_{4}	yttrium(III) vanadate	13566–12–6
Y_{2}O_{3}	yttrium(III) oxide	1314–36–9
Y_{2}S_{3}	yttrium(III) sulfide	12039–19–9
YbBr_{2}	ytterbium(II) bromide	25502–05–0
YbBr_{3}	ytterbium(III) bromide	13759–89–2
YbCl_{2}	ytterbium(II) chloride	13874–77–6
YbCl_{3}	ytterbium(III) chloride	10361–91–8
YbCl_{3}•6H_{2}O	ytterbium(III) chloride hexahydrate	19423–87–1
YbF_{2}	ytterbium(II) fluoride	15192–18–4
YbF_{3}	ytterbium(III) fluoride	13760–80–0
YbI_{2}	ytterbium(II) iodide	19357–86–9
YbI_{3}	ytterbium(III) iodide	13813–44–0
YbSe	ytterbium(II) selenide	12039–54–2
YbSi_{5}	ytterbium(V) silicide	12039–89–3
YbTe	ytterbium(II) telluride	12125–58–5
Yb_{2}O_{3}	ytterbium(III) oxide	1314–37–0
Yb_{2}S_{3}	ytterbium(III) sulfide	12039–20–2
Yb_{2}Se_{3}	ytterbium(III) selenide	12166–52–8

== Z ==
Chemical formula	Synonyms	CAS number
Zn(AsO_{2})_{2}	zinc arsenite	10326–24–6
Zn(AsO_{3})_{2}	zinc arsenate	12006–40–5
ZnBr_{2}	zinc bromide	7699–45–8
Zn(CN)_{2}	zinc cyanide	557–21–1
ZnCO_{3}	zinc carbonate	3486–35–9
Zn(C_{2}H_{3}O_{2})_{2}	zinc acetate	557–34–6
ZnC_{2}O_{4}	zinc oxalate	547–68–2
ZnC_{3}H_{7}O_{6}P	zinc glycerophosphate	1300–26–1
ZnC_{4}H_{2}O_{4}	zinc fumarate	52723–61–2
ZnC_{4}H_{4}O_{4}	zinc succinate	6228–53–1
ZnC_{6}H_{10}O_{4}	zinc propionate	557–28–8
ZnC_{6}H_{10}O_{6}	zinc lactate	16039–53–5
ZnC_{6}H_{12}N_{2}S_{4}	zinc dimethyldithiocarbonate	137–30–4
Zn(C_{8}H_{15}O_{2})_{2}	zinc caprylate	557–09–5
ZnC_{10}H_{20}N_{2}S_{4}	zinc dimethyldithiocarbamate	14324–55–1
Zn(C_{18}H_{35}O_{2})_{2}	zinc stearate	557–05–1
Zn(ClO_{3})_{2}	zinc chlorate	10361–95–2
Zn(ClO_{4})_{2}	zinc perchlorate	10025–64–6
ZnCl_{2}	zinc chloride	7646–85–7
ZnCrO_{4}	zinc chromate	13530–65–9
ZnCr_{2}O_{4}	zinc chromite	12018–19–8
ZnCr_{2}O_{7}	zinc dichromate	14018–95–2
ZnF_{2}	zinc fluoride	7783–49–5
ZnH_{2}	zinc hydride	14018–82–7
Zn(IO_{3})_{2}	zinc iodate	7790–37–6
ZnI_{2}	zinc iodide	10139–47–6
Zn(MnO_{4})_{2}	zinc permanganate	23414–72–4
ZnMoO_{4}	zinc molybdate	13767–32–3
Zn(NO_{2})_{2}	zinc nitrite	10102–02–0
Zn(NO_{3})_{2}	zinc nitrate	7779–88–6
ZnO	zinc oxide	1314–13–2
Zn(OH)_{2}	zinc hydroxide	20427–58–1
ZnO_{2}	zinc peroxide	1314–22–3
ZnS	zinc sulfide	1314–98–3
Zn(SCN)_{2}	zinc thiocyanate	557–42–6
ZnSO_{4}	zinc sulfate	7733–02–0
ZnSb	zinc antimonide	12039–35–9
ZnSe	zinc selenide	1315–09–9
ZnSnO_{3}	zinc stannate	12036–37–2
ZnTe	zinc telluride	1315–11–3
ZnTiO_{3}	zinc titanate	12036–43–0
ZnWO_{4}	zinc tungstate	13597–56–3
Zn_{2}Fe(CN)_{6}	zinc ferrocyanide	14883–46–6
Zn_{2}P_{2}O_{7}	zinc pyrophosphate	7446–26–6
Zn_{2}SiO_{4}	zinc orthosilicate	13597–65–4
Zn_{3}(AsO_{4})_{2}	zinc arsenate	13464–44–3
Zn_{3}(BO_{3})_{2}	zinc borate	12880–01–2
Zn_{3}N_{2}	zinc nitride	1313–49–1
Zn_{3}P_{2}	zinc phosphide	1314–84–7
Zn_{3}(PO_{4})_{2}	zinc phosphate	7779–90–0
ZrBr_{3}	zirconium(III) bromide	24621–18–9
ZrBr_{4}	zirconium(IV) bromide	13777–25–8
ZrC	zirconium(IV) carbide	12070–14–3
ZrCl_{2}	zirconium(II) chloride	13762–26–0
ZrCl_{4}	zirconium(IV) chloride	10026–11–6
ZrF_{4}	zirconium(IV) fluoride	7783–64–4
ZrH_{2}	zirconium(II) hydride	7704–99–6
ZrI_{2}	zirconium(II) iodide	15513–85–6
ZrI_{3}	zirconium(III) iodide	13779–87–8
ZrI_{4}	zirconium(IV) iodide	13986–26–0
ZrN	zirconium(III) nitride	25658–42–8
Zr(OH)_{4}	zirconium(IV) hydroxide	14475–63–9
ZrO	zirconium(II) oxide	12036–01–0
ZrO_{2}	zirconium(IV) oxide	1314–23–4
Zr(HPO_{4})	zirconium(IV) phosphate	13765–95–2
ZrP_{2}	zirconium(IV) phosphide	12037–80–8
Zr(SO_{4})_{2}	zirconium(IV) sulfate	14644–61–2
ZrS_{2}	zirconium(IV) sulfide	12039–15–5
ZrSe_{2}	zirconium(IV) selenide	12166–47–1
ZrSi_{2}	zirconium(IV) silicide	12039–90–6
ZrSiO_{4}	zirconium(IV) silicate	10101–52–7
ZrTe_{2}	zirconium(IV) telluride	32321–65–6
Zr(WO_{4})_{2}	zirconium(IV) tungstate	16853–74–0
