= Europium disilicide =

Names
- IUPAC name europium; λ^{3}-silanylidynesilicon
- Other names: Europium silicide; Europium(II) silicide

Identifiers
CAS Number	12434-24-1
3D model (JSmol)	Interactive image
ECHA InfoCard	100.032.410
EC Number	235-665-8
PubChem CID	170843614
CompTox Dashboard (EPA)	DTXSID701312271
- InChI: InChI=1S/Eu.2Si Key: HWWYYCDRYIYGQB-UHFFFAOYSA-N
- SMILES: [Si].[Si].[Eu]

Properties
Chemical formula	EuSi_{2}
Molar mass	208.134 g·mol^{−1}
Appearance	Dark gray crystals
Density	5.46 g/cm^{3}
Melting point	1,500 °C (2,730 °F; 1,770 K)
Solubility in water	insoluble

Structure
Crystal structure	tetragonal
- Except where otherwise noted, data are given for materials in their standard state (at 25 °C [77 °F], 100 kPa). Infobox references

Europium disilicide is a binary inorganic compound of europium and silicon with the chemical formula EuSi_{2}.

== Synthesis ==
- Sintering of pure substances in an inert atmosphere:

Eu + 2Si → EuSi_{2}

- Reduction of europium(III) oxide by silicon in vacuum:

Eu_{2}O_{3} + 7Si → 2EuSi_{2} + 3SiO_{2}

== Physical properties ==
Europium disilicide forms dark gray crystals of hexagonal or tetragonal system (space group I4_{1}/amd), insoluble in water, cell parameters a = 0.429 nm, c = 1.366 nm.

== Uses ==
EuSi_{2}-powder exhibits good electrical conductivity, thermal stability, and semiconducting properties. Europium disilicide in the form of thin films finds application in microelectronics.
