= Lanthanum iodide =

Lanthanum iodide may refer to:

- Lanthanum diiodide, LaI_{2}
- Lanthanum(III) iodide (lanthanum triiodide), LaI_{3}
