= Technetium(IV) sulfide =

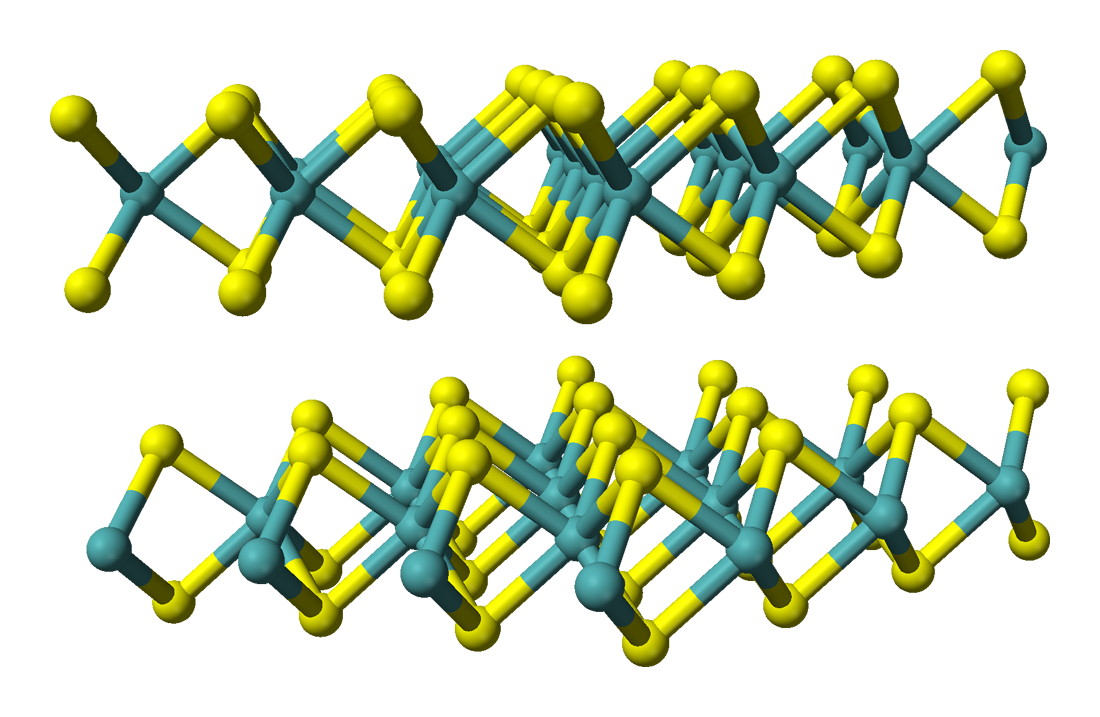

Names
- Other names Technetium disulphide

Identifiers
CAS Number	34312-50-0
3D model (JSmol)	Interactive image
ChemSpider	9587449
PubChem CID	20214736
- InChI: InChI=1S/2S.Tc Key: YNVKFYSGICQOCU-UHFFFAOYSA-N
- SMILES: [Tc].[S].[S]

Properties
Chemical formula	S_{2}Tc
Molar mass	162 g·mol^{−1}

Structure
Crystal structure	trigonal

Related compounds
Related compounds	Molybdenum disulfide
- Except where otherwise noted, data are given for materials in their standard state (at 25 °C [77 °F], 100 kPa). Infobox references

Technetium disulphide is a binary inorganic chemical compound of technetium metal and sulfur with the chemical formula TcS_{2}.

== Synthesis ==
The compound can be prepared from the higher oxide:

2Tc_{2}O_{7} + 15S → 4TcS_{2} + 7SO_{2}

Also, the compound can be prepared by the reaction between both elements in a sealed tube at 450 °C, by the reaction between such components as Tc_{2}(O_{2}CCH_{3})_{5} and H_{2}S-gas in a flowing system at 450 °C, and by the reaction between K_{2}TcCl_{6} and H_{2}S-gas in sulfuric acid.

== Physical properties ==
Technetium disulfide is isomorphous with rhenium disulfide and has an MoS_{2}-type structure.

Technetium disulphide is reduced to the metal if heated to 1000 °C in a hydrogen atmosphere.
