= Potassium aluminate =

Names
- IUPAC name potassium aluminate

Identifiers
CAS Number	12003-63-3
3D model (JSmol)	Interactive image
ChemSpider	8394879
ECHA InfoCard	100.031.289
EC Number	234-432-8
PubChem CID	23670858
UNII	TGN4M9CD7R
CompTox Dashboard (EPA)	DTXSID0065143
- InChI: InChI=1S/Al.K.2O/q;+1;;-1 Key: KVOIJEARBNBHHP-UHFFFAOYSA-N
- SMILES: [O-][Al]=O.[K+]

Properties
Chemical formula	K_{2}Al_{2}O_{4}
Molar mass	196.156 g·mol^{−1}
Solubility in water	very soluble

Hazards
- GHS labelling
Pictograms	(GHS05: Corrosive)
Signal word	Danger
Hazard statements	H314
Precautionary statements	P260, P264, P280, P301+P330+P331, P303+P361+P353, P304+P340, P305+P351+P338, P310, P321, P363, P405, P501
- Except where otherwise noted, data are given for materials in their standard state (at 25 °C [77 °F], 100 kPa). verify (what is ?) Infobox references

Potassium aluminate is an inorganic compound with the empirical formula KAlO_{2}, composed of the potassium cation and the AlO^{−}_{2} aluminate anion, which in aqueous solution exists as K[Al(OH)_{4}].

== Reactions ==
Potassium aluminate can be used to produce potassium alum with sulfuric acid in this reaction.

KAlO_{2} + 2 H_{2}SO_{4} ⇌ KAl(SO_{4})_{2} + 2 H_{2}O
