= Tantalum trialuminide =

Tantalum(III) aluminide
Names
- Other names tantalum trialuminide

Identifiers
CAS Number	12004-76-1
3D model (JSmol)	Interactive image
ChemSpider	4891844
ECHA InfoCard	100.031.314
EC Number	234-460-0
PubChem CID	6336851
CompTox Dashboard (EPA)	DTXSID9065150
- InChI: Key: LJVJDEGCVHBSKZ-UHFFFAOYSA-N; InChI=1S/3Al.Ta
- SMILES: [Al].[Al].[Al].[Ta]

Properties
Chemical formula	TaAl_{3}
Molar mass	261.893 g/mol
Appearance	gray refractory powder
Density	7.02 g/cm^{3}, solid
Melting point	1,400 °C (2,550 °F; 1,670 K)
Solubility in water	insoluble
- Except where otherwise noted, data are given for materials in their standard state (at 25 °C [77 °F], 100 kPa). verify (what is ?) Infobox references

Tantalum trialuminide (TaAl_{3}) is an inorganic chemical compound. This compound and Ta_{3}Al are stable, refractory, and reflective, and they have been proposed as coatings for use in infrared wave mirrors.
