= Lithium hexafluoroaluminate =

Names
- IUPAC name trilithium;trifluoroalumane;trifluoride
- Other names trilithium hexafluoroaluminate

Identifiers
CAS Number	13821-20-0
3D model (JSmol)	Interactive image
ChemSpider	11511345
EC Number	237-509-4
PubChem CID	160996
CompTox Dashboard (EPA)	DTXSID30893962
- InChI: InChI=1S/Al.6FH.3Li/h;6*1H;;;/q+3;;;;;;;3*+1/p-6 Key: VRSRNLHMYUACMN-UHFFFAOYSA-H
- SMILES: [Li+].[Li+].[Li+].F[Al-3](F)(F)(F)(F)F

Properties
Chemical formula	AlF_{6}Li_{3}
Molar mass	161.79 g·mol^{−1}
Appearance	White powder
Density	2.637 g/cm^{3}
Melting point	790

Hazards
- GHS labelling
Pictograms	(GHS07: Exclamation mark) (GHS06: Toxic)
Signal word	Danger
Hazard statements	H332, H362, H372, H411
- Except where otherwise noted, data are given for materials in their standard state (at 25 °C [77 °F], 100 kPa). Infobox references

Lithium hexafluoroaluminate is an inorganic chemical compound with the chemical formula Li_{3}AlF_{6}.

== Synthesis ==
The compound crystallizes from melts of lithium fluoride and aluminium fluoride:

3LiF + AlF_{3} → Li_{3}AlF_{6}.
