= Thallium(I) hexafluorophosphate =

Names
- IUPAC name thallium(1+); hexafluorophosphate
- Other names Thallium hexafluorophosphate

Identifiers
CAS Number	60969-19-9
3D model (JSmol)	Interactive image
EC Number	633-081-1
PubChem CID	10904204
CompTox Dashboard (EPA)	DTXSID20447852
- InChI: InChI=1S/F6P.Tl/c1-7(2,3,4,5)6;/q-1;+1 Key: FRZBCOUMLHRKRT-UHFFFAOYSA-N
- SMILES: F[P-](F)(F)(F)(F)F.[Tl+]

Properties
Chemical formula	TlPF_{6}
Appearance	White crystals
Density	4.6 g/cm^{3}
Solubility in water	Soluble

Hazards
- GHS labelling
Pictograms	(GHS08: Health hazard) (GHS06: Toxic)
Signal word	Danger
- Except where otherwise noted, data are given for materials in their standard state (at 25 °C [77 °F], 100 kPa). Infobox references

Thallium(I) hexafluorophosphate is an inorganic chemical compound with the chemical formula TlPF_{6}.

== Physical properties ==
Thallium hexafluorophosphate is toxic and should be handled in a hood.

The compound forms white crystals of the cubic system, space group Pa3.

It is soluble in water.
