= Thorium(IV) orthosilicate =

Names
- Preferred IUPAC name Thorium(IV) orthosilicate
- Systematic IUPAC name Thorium(4+) silicate
- Other names Thorite; Thorium(4+) orthosilicate

Identifiers
CAS Number	15501-85-6
3D model (JSmol)	Interactive image
ChemSpider	161685
PubChem CID	186011
CompTox Dashboard (EPA)	DTXSID10935117
- InChI: InChI=1S/O4Si.Th/c1-5(2,3)4;/q-4;+4 Key: XSSPKPCFRBQLBU-UHFFFAOYSA-N; InChI=1/O4Si.Th/c1-5(2,3)4;/q-4;+4 Key: XSSPKPCFRBQLBU-UHFFFAOYAP
- SMILES: [Th+4].[O-][Si]([O-])([O-])[O-]

Properties
Chemical formula	O_{4}SiTh
Molar mass	324.119 g·mol^{−1}
Appearance	Brown crystals
Density	6.7 g cm^{−3}

Structure
Crystal structure	tetragonal cubic
- Except where otherwise noted, data are given for materials in their standard state (at 25 °C [77 °F], 100 kPa). verify (what is ?) Infobox references

Thorium(IV) orthosilicate (ThSiO_{4}) is an inorganic chemical compound. Thorite is a mineral that consists essentially of thorium orthosilicate.
