= Zinc lactate =

Names
- Other names Zinc dilactate, zinc 2-hydroxypropionate

Identifiers
CAS Number	16039-53-5
3D model (JSmol)	Interactive image
ChemSpider	2277401
ECHA InfoCard	100.036.510
EC Number	240-178-9
PubChem CID	27653
UNII	2GXR25858Y
CompTox Dashboard (EPA)	DTXSID70970746
- InChI: InChI=1S/2C3H6O3.Zn/c2*1-2(4)3(5)6;/h2*2,4H,1H3,(H,5,6); Key: GWUDZEJIEQLLHN-UHFFFAOYSA-N
- SMILES: CC(C(=O)O)O.CC(C(=O)O)O.[Zn]

Properties
Chemical formula	C_{6}H_{10}ZnO_{6}
Molar mass	245.5
Appearance	White crystals
Melting point	277 °C (531 °F; 550 K)
Solubility in water	Soluble
- Except where otherwise noted, data are given for materials in their standard state (at 25 °C [77 °F], 100 kPa). Infobox references

Zinc lactate is a chemical compound, a salt of zinc and lactic acid with the formula Zn(C_{3}H_{5}O_{3})_{2}.

== Synthesis ==
Reaction of lactic acid with zinc oxide:

2CH_{3}CH(OH)COOH + ZnO → Zn(C_{3}H_{5}O_{3})_{2} + H_{2}O

== Physical properties ==
Zinc lactate appears as a white to almost white fine powder.

Zinc lactate is nearly odourless, highly soluble in water, and insoluble in ethanol.

Zinc lactate forms dihydrates with the chemical formula Zn(C_{3}H_{5}O_{3})_{2} • 2H_{2}O.

== Use ==
The compound is used in dental care products like toothpaste or mouthwash.

Can also be used as a dietary ingredient and as a nutrient.

The compound has antioxidant properties in mammals and can improve intestinal function.
