= Potassium hexafluoroaluminate =

Names
- IUPAC name tripotassium;hexafluoroaluminum(3-)

Identifiers
CAS Number	60996-20-5
3D model (JSmol)	Interactive image
ChemSpider	11254636
ECHA InfoCard	100.033.994
EC Number	262-553-6
PubChem CID	16693907
CompTox Dashboard (EPA)	DTXSID30893967
- InChI: InChI=1S/Al.6FH.3K/h;6*1H;;;/q+3;;;;;;;3*+1/p-6 Key: ZIZQEDPMQXFXTE-UHFFFAOYSA-H
- SMILES: F[Al-3](F)(F)(F)(F)F.[K+].[K+].[K+]

Properties
Chemical formula	K_{3}AlF_{6}
Appearance	powder
Melting point	1035
Solubility in water	slightly soluble

Hazards
- GHS labelling
Pictograms	(GHS07: Exclamation mark) (GHS08: Health hazard)
Signal word	Warning
- Except where otherwise noted, data are given for materials in their standard state (at 25 °C [77 °F], 100 kPa). Infobox references

Potassium hexafluoroaluminate is an inorganic chemical compound with the chemical formula K_{3}AlF_{6}. It naturally occurs as the mineral cryolite.

== Synthesis ==
Potassium hexafluoroaluminate can be obtained by reacting fluoroaluminic acid (obtained by the reaction of anhydrous hydrogen fluoride and aluminum hydroxide) with potassium hydroxide at high temperature, followed by filtering, drying, melting, and crushing.

6HF + Al(OH)_{3} → AlF_{3}·3HF + 3H_{2}O
AlF_{3}·3HF + 3KOH → K_{3}AlF_{6} + 3H_{2}O

== Physical characteristics ==
Potassium hexafluoroaluminate appears as a white to light grey powder, and is slightly soluble in water.

It forms colorless crystals of the tetragonal system, space group I4_{1}/a.

== Uses ==
Potassium hexafluoroaluminate is used as a welding agent.

It is also used in the production of pesticides, manufacture of glassware and enamel industry, in addition to being a solvent for the bauxite in the electrical manufacture of aluminum.
