= Sodium metatitanate =

Identifiers
CAS Number	12034-36-5
3D model (JSmol)	Interactive image
ChemSpider	17340399
ECHA InfoCard	100.031.627
EC Number	234-803-4
PubChem CID	16212573
CompTox Dashboard (EPA)	DTXSID60890868
- InChI: Key: GROMGGTZECPEKN-UHFFFAOYSA-N; InChI=1S/2Na.7O.3Ti/q2*+1;;;;;;2*-1;;;
- SMILES: [O-][Ti](=O)O[Ti](=O)O[Ti](=O)[O-].[Na+].[Na+]

Properties
Chemical formula	Na_{2}TiO_{3}
Molar mass	301.62 g/mol
Appearance	Pale yellow crystalline solid
Melting point	1,031 °C (1,888 °F; 1,304 K)
Solubility in water	Insoluble
Solubility	Slightly soluble in hydrochloric acid

Hazards
NFPA 704 (fire diamond)	1 0 0
- Except where otherwise noted, data are given for materials in their standard state (at 25 °C [77 °F], 100 kPa). verify (what is ?) Infobox references

Sodium metatitanate is a chemical compound with the chemical formula Na_{2}TiO_{3}. This compound decomposes with treatment with hot water. The name sodium metatitanate is also used incorrectly to refer to the compound sodium trititanate (Na_{2}Ti_{3}O_{7}).

== Production ==
Sodium metatitanate can be produced by heating titanium dioxide and sodium carbonate at 1000 °C:

TiO_{2} + Na_{2}CO_{3} → Na_{2}TiO_{3} + CO_{2}
