= Californium dichloride =

Names
- IUPAC name Dichlorocalifornium
- Other names Californium(II) chloride

Identifiers
CAS Number	99643-99-9
3D model (JSmol)	Interactive image
ChemSpider	64885668
- InChI: InChI=1S/Cf.2ClH/h;2*1H/q+2;;/p-2 Key: ZLTRAJDZJNQTLH-UHFFFAOYSA-L
- SMILES: [Cf+2].[Cl-].[Cl-]

Properties
Chemical formula	CfCl_{2}
Molar mass	322 g·mol^{−1}
Appearance	amber solid

Related compounds
Related compounds	Americium dichloride, einsteinium dichloride
- Except where otherwise noted, data are given for materials in their standard state (at 25 °C [77 °F], 100 kPa). Infobox references

Californium dichloride is a binary inorganic compound of californium metal and chlorine with the chemical formula CfCl_{2}.

== Synthesis ==
CfCl_{2} can be prepared by hydrogen reduction of CfCl_{3} at a high temperature (600 °C).

== Physical properties ==
The compound forms moisture-sensitive amber solid.
