= Lithium methoxide =

Names
- IUPAC name Lithium methoxide
- Other names Lithium methanolate

Identifiers
CAS Number	865-34-9
3D model (JSmol)	Interactive image
Abbreviations	MeOLi
ChemSpider	144418
ECHA InfoCard	100.011.580
PubChem CID	164741
CompTox Dashboard (EPA)	DTXSID00890529
- InChI: InChI=1S/CH3O.Li/c1-2;/h1H3;/q-1;+1 Key: JILPJDVXYVTZDQ-UHFFFAOYSA-N; InChI=1/CH3O.Li/c1-2;/h1H3;/q-1;+1 Key: JILPJDVXYVTZDQ-UHFFFAOYAW
- SMILES: [Li+].[O-]C

Properties
Chemical formula	CH_{3}LiO
Molar mass	37.97 g·mol^{−1}
- Except where otherwise noted, data are given for materials in their standard state (at 25 °C [77 °F], 100 kPa). Infobox references

Lithium methoxide is a compound with formula LiCH_{3}O. It is the lithium salt of methanol. Like other alkali metal alkoxides, lithium methoxide adopts a polymeric structure. Its solubility in common polar aprotic solvents like THF is low; however, it is soluble in methanol and is available commercially as a 10% solution.

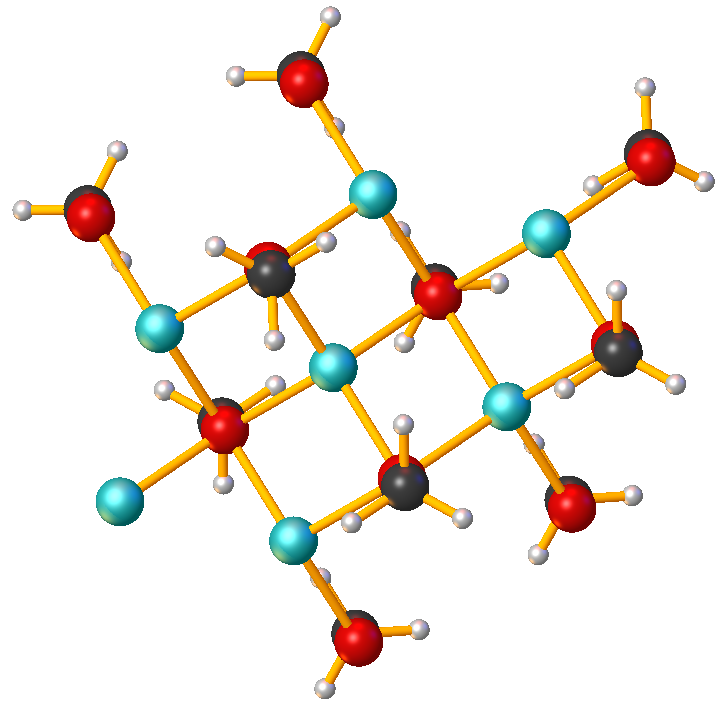
Portion of the solid-state structure of LiOCH_{3}.

== See also ==
- Methoxide
