= Chromium tetraiodide =

Chemical substance

Names
- Other names Chromium(IV) iodide

Identifiers
CAS Number	23518-77-6
3D model (JSmol)	Interactive image
PubChem CID	175767911
- InChI: InChI=1S/Cr.4HI/h;4*1H/q+4;;;;/p-4 Key: MQZQPFPMJSXGLG-UHFFFAOYSA-J
- SMILES: [Cr](I)(I)(I)I

Properties
Chemical formula	CrI_{4}
Appearance	gas
- Except where otherwise noted, data are given for materials in their standard state (at 25 °C [77 °F], 100 kPa). Infobox references

Chromium tetraiodide is an inorganic chemical compound with the chemical formula CrI_{4}.

== Synthesis ==
The compound can be prepared by reacting iodine vapor with chromium at a temperature higher than 150 °C but lower than 400 °C.

Cr + 2I_{2} → CrI_{4}

== Physical properties ==
The compound occurs in the gas phase.
