= Road salt =

Chemicals used to de-ice surfaces

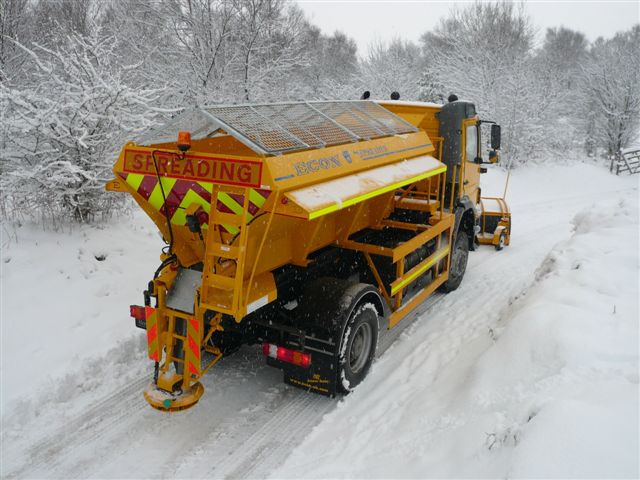
An Econ-brand salt spreader spreading salt on a road during the 2010 UK winter.

Road salt (also known as deicing salt, rock salt, snow salt or grit salt) is a salt used mainly as an anti-slip and deicing agent for roads, sidewalks and other transportation surfaces during the winter. The most commonly used form is sodium chloride (NaCl), though other salts such as calcium chloride and magnesium chloride are also employed, especially in colder temperatures. When used in its solid form, road salt is often pre-wet to accelerate the ice-melting process. Road salt lowers the freezing point of water through freezing-point depression and thus prevents ice formation, which in turn improves traction and safety for vehicles and pedestrians.

The widespread use of road salts began in the 20th century and has since been standard practice in many regions with yearly snowfall, especially in Europe and North America. Millions of tons of salt are applied to road surfaces yearly, making it one of the most extensively used chemical agents in urban infrastructure. It has become popular due to its effectiveness, low cost, and ease of application.

Road salts have adverse effects on the environment. Chloride ions from road salt can accumulate in soils, surface waters, and groundwater, where they persist and may harm aquatic ecosystems, roadside vegetation, and drinking water supplies. Road salt also accelerates corrosion of vehicles, bridges, and reinforced concrete, leading to increased maintenance costs. These concerns have prompted research into alternative de-icing materials, improved application techniques, and policies aimed at reducing salt use while maintaining road safety.

== History ==
The use of salt for snow and ice control began in the early 20th century. In Paris, sodium chloride was applied on a large scale to combat black ice, although the practice soon revealed disadvantages such as corrosion of iron structures and damage to the hooves of draft animals. Despite these drawbacks, the method proved effective in improving road safety and was soon adopted in other cities and countries.

The use of salt for deicing roads began in the United States in the late 1930s, when New Hampshire experimented with spreading granular sodium chloride on roads in 1938. By the winter of 1941–1942, New Hampshire formally adopted a statewide salt-spreading policy; about 5,000 tons of salt were applied on U.S. highways that season. Before the adoption of road salt in New Hampshire, road maintenance in winter typically relied on plowing and spreading abrasives (sand, cinders) for traction, with salt only used occasionally (e.g. to slow freezing in stored sand piles).

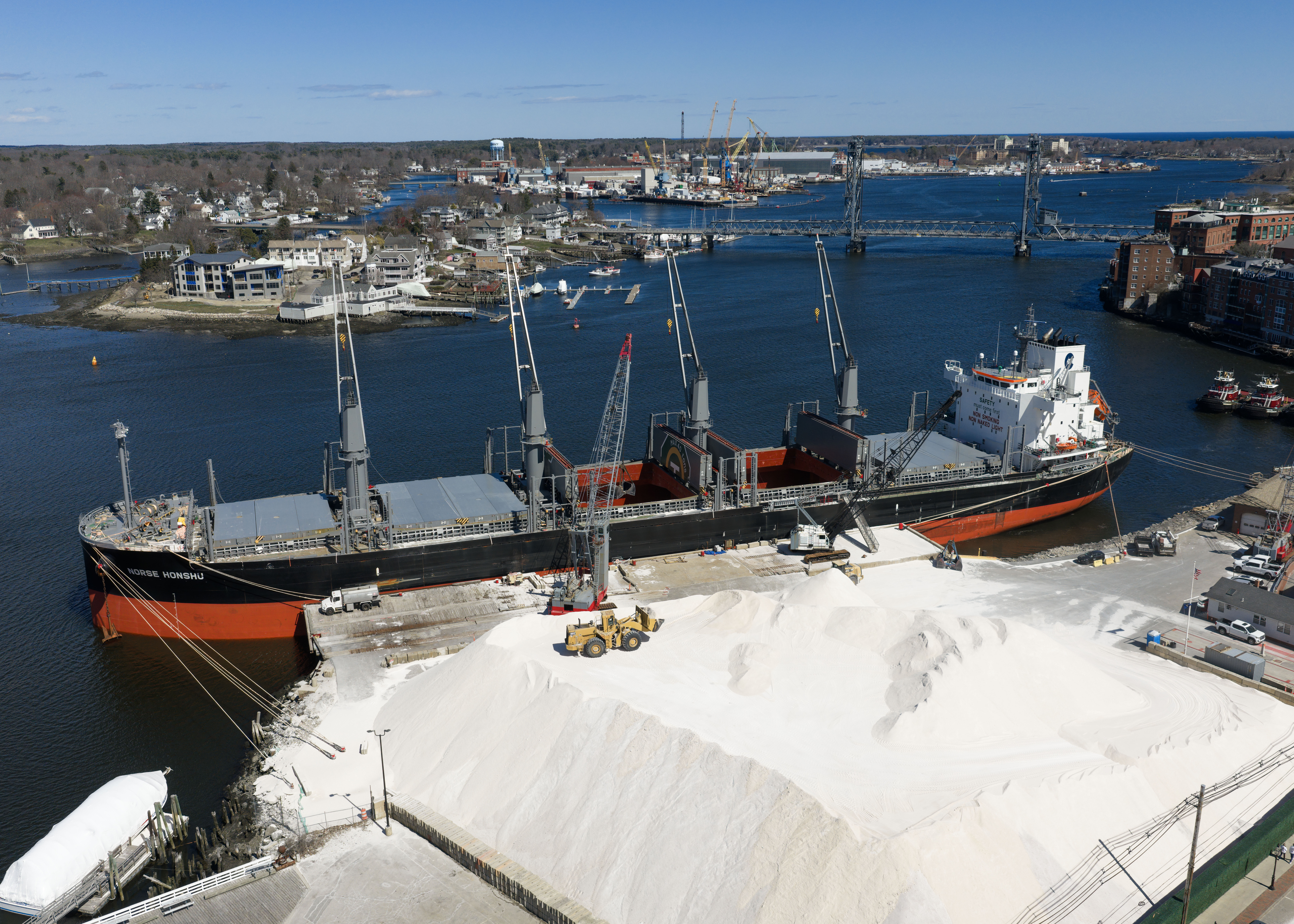
Bulk carrier unloading road salt in Portsmouth, New Hampshire

In the post-war era, as the U.S. highway networks expanded and the "bare pavement" standard (expectation that roads be cleared quickly) became dominant, salt usage increased greatly. During the 1950s and 1960s U.S. salt consumption doubled roughly every five years, climbing from about 1 million tons in the mid-1950s to nearly 10 million tons less than a decade later. Supply sources developed along with the demand, large underground rock-salt deposits (formed by the evaporation of ancient seas) supplied much of the salt. The Detroit salt mine (first discovered in 1895) became a prominent example as the mines expanded over the 20th century and supported local deicing operations. Detroit itself was among the earliest cities to apply salt to its roads (circa 1940) believed to be due to its proximity to the resource.

A parallel development occurred in Europe. In Germany salt spreading became common in the 1960s as motorization increased and road-safety demands grew. Authorities established salt storage facilities and distributed salt manually from trucks before mechanical spreaders were introduced to improve efficiency. The transition from dry to wet-salt application in the early 1970s represented a further advancement, as saturated salt adhered better to road surfaces and was less susceptible to wind displacement.

In later decades salt use stabilized (on the order of tens of millions of tons per year in the U.S.), and attention has shifted to optimizing application methods and mitigating collateral impacts. More recently, occasional supply constraints and environmental concerns have spurred experimentation with reduced-salt strategies and alternative de-icers (e.g., saturated salt–organic blends, calcium or magnesium salts).

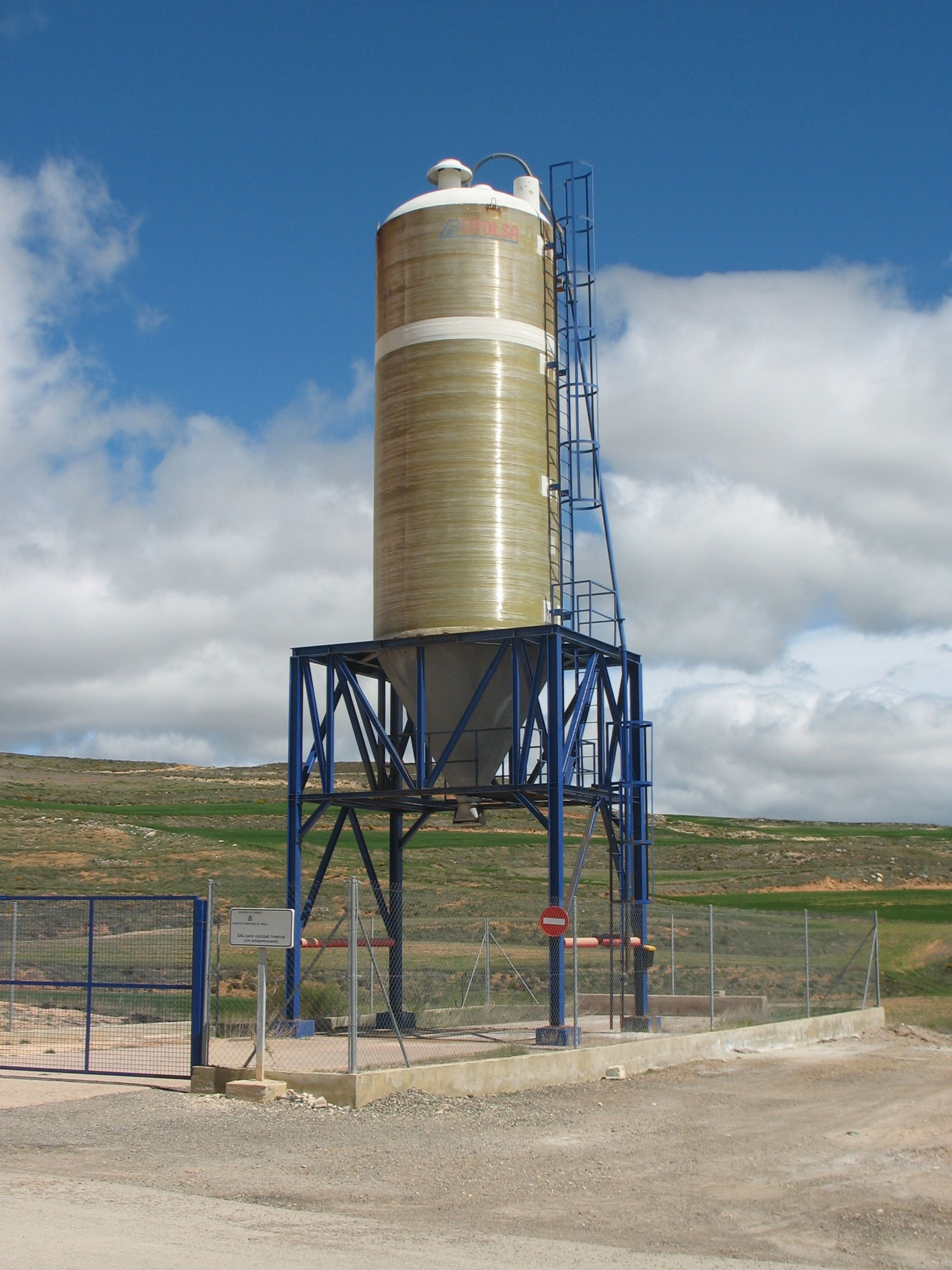
Storage tank for road salt in Puente de los Hocinos, Spain

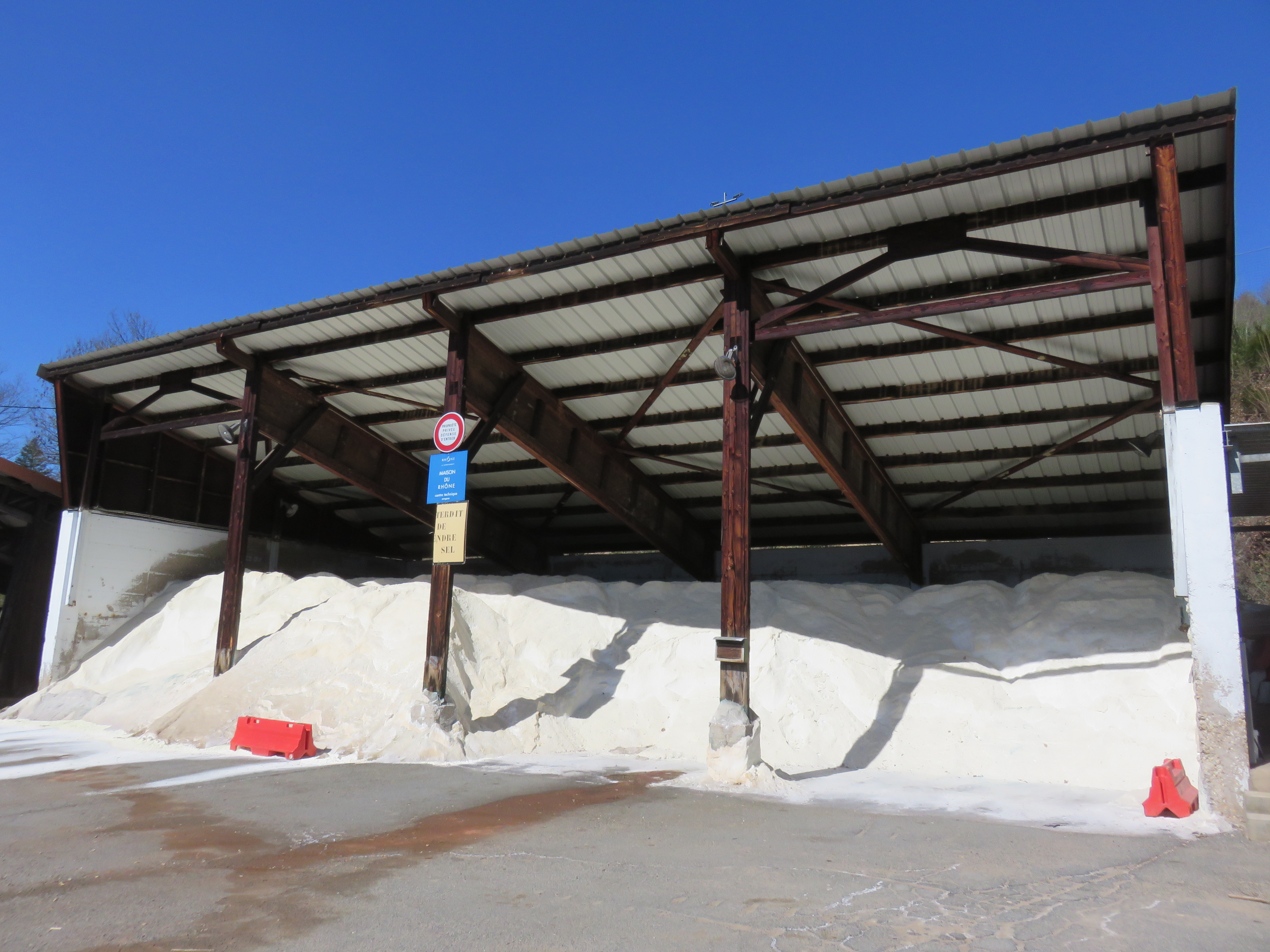
Road salt storage depot in Lamure-sur-Azergues (Rhône, France)

== Spreading ==
Road salt is applied to road surfaces primarily to prevent the formation of ice or to melt existing snow and ice. Application methods and quantities vary depending on weather conditions, road type, traffic volume, and local policies.

=== Deicing and anti-icing ===
Two main strategies are used in winter road maintenance. De-icing involves applying road salt after snow or ice has formed on the roadway. The salt lowers the freezing point of water, allowing ice to melt and preventing refreezing under certain temperature conditions. Anti-icing is a preventive approach in which salt or salt brine is applied to dry or wet pavement before snowfall or freezing rain occurs. This method is intended to inhibit ice from bonding to the road surface and can reduce the total amount of salt required. Anti-icing is generally considered more efficient than de-icing when applied under appropriate weather forecasts.

=== Application methods ===
Road salt can be applied in various forms, mainly as dry rock salt, pre-wetted salt and brine. Dry rock salt consists of solid salt crystals spread directly onto the roadway. It is the most traditional and widely used form of road salt, despite being less effective at lower temperatures and being prone to being blown off of the roadway by traffic.

Road salt and brine are generally spread using a winter service vehicle called a salt spreader. Salt spreaders are typically added to trucks, loaders, or in the case of brine, tankers. The salt is stored in the large hopper on the rear of the vehicle, with a wire mesh over the top to prevent foreign objects from entering the spreading mechanism and hence becoming jammed. The salt is generally spread across the roadway by an impeller, attached by a hydraulic drive system to a small onboard engine. However, until the 1970s, it was often spread manually either by workers shoveling salt from trucks or by smaller wheelbarrow-like vehicles, the latter still being used today for personal use. Some older spreading mechanisms still require it to be manually loaded into the impeller from the hopper.

== Mechanics ==
Salt for use of melting ice and snow works through a phenomenon called freezing-point depression, the lowering of a substance's freezing point after the addition of solutes. When road salt is added to roads, aside from providing better friction for vehicles on the road, it also dissolves in the water of the ice, resulting in a lower freezing point. As long as the temperature is above this freezing point, this in turn results in the ice melting. Because of this, ordinary rock salt is only effective down to a range of −6 to −10 °C (21 to 14 °F). At colder temperatures, it can have the opposite effect. If milder weather is expected, road salt is sometimes used even in colder conditions. In very cold and dry weather, the road surface becomes rough and the need for de-icing is reduced. But during extreme cold and rain, the roads can become extremely difficult to pass and, in some cases, roads may need to be closed to traffic.

== Types of salt ==
Various types of salts (from top): Sodium chloride, calcium chloride, magnesium chloride.
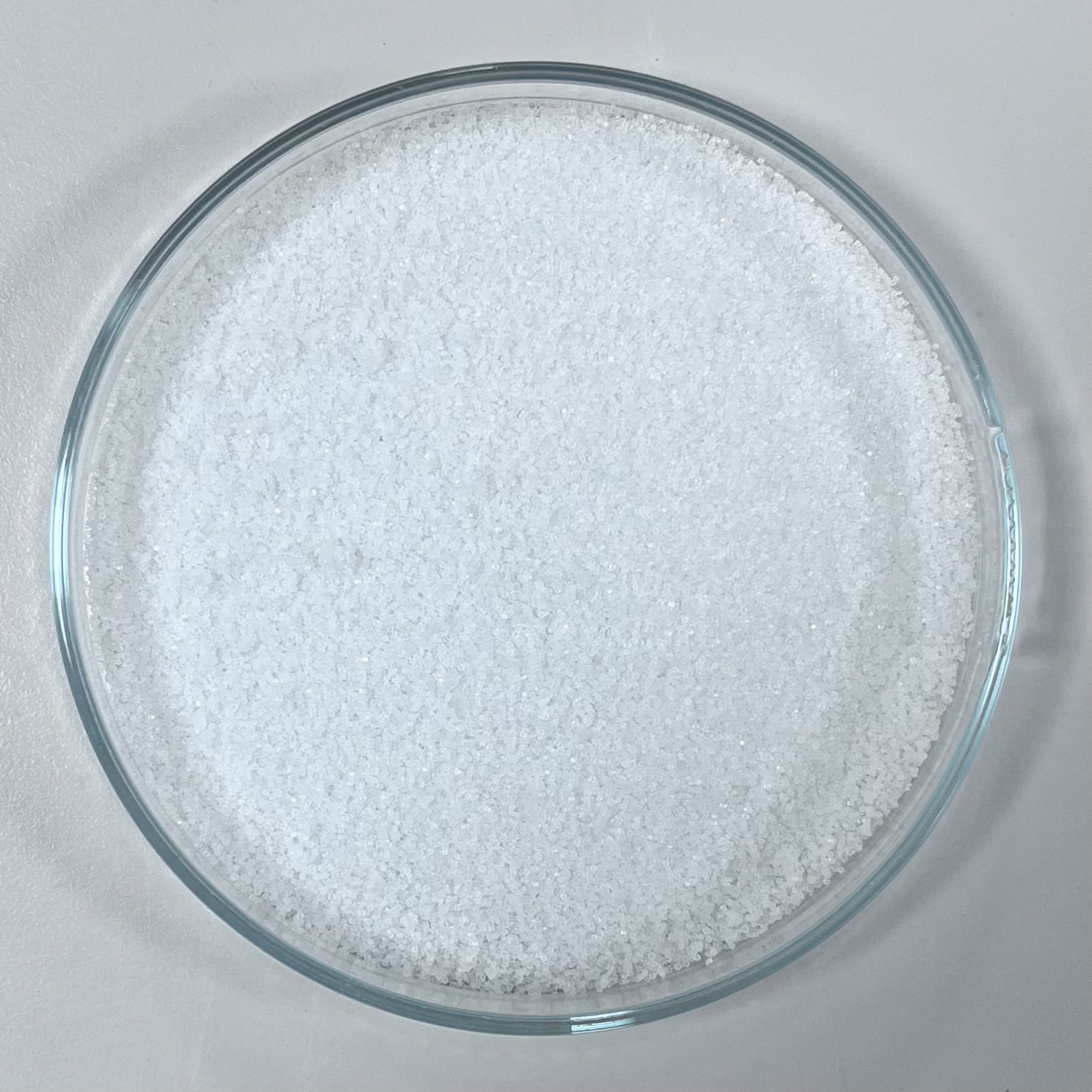
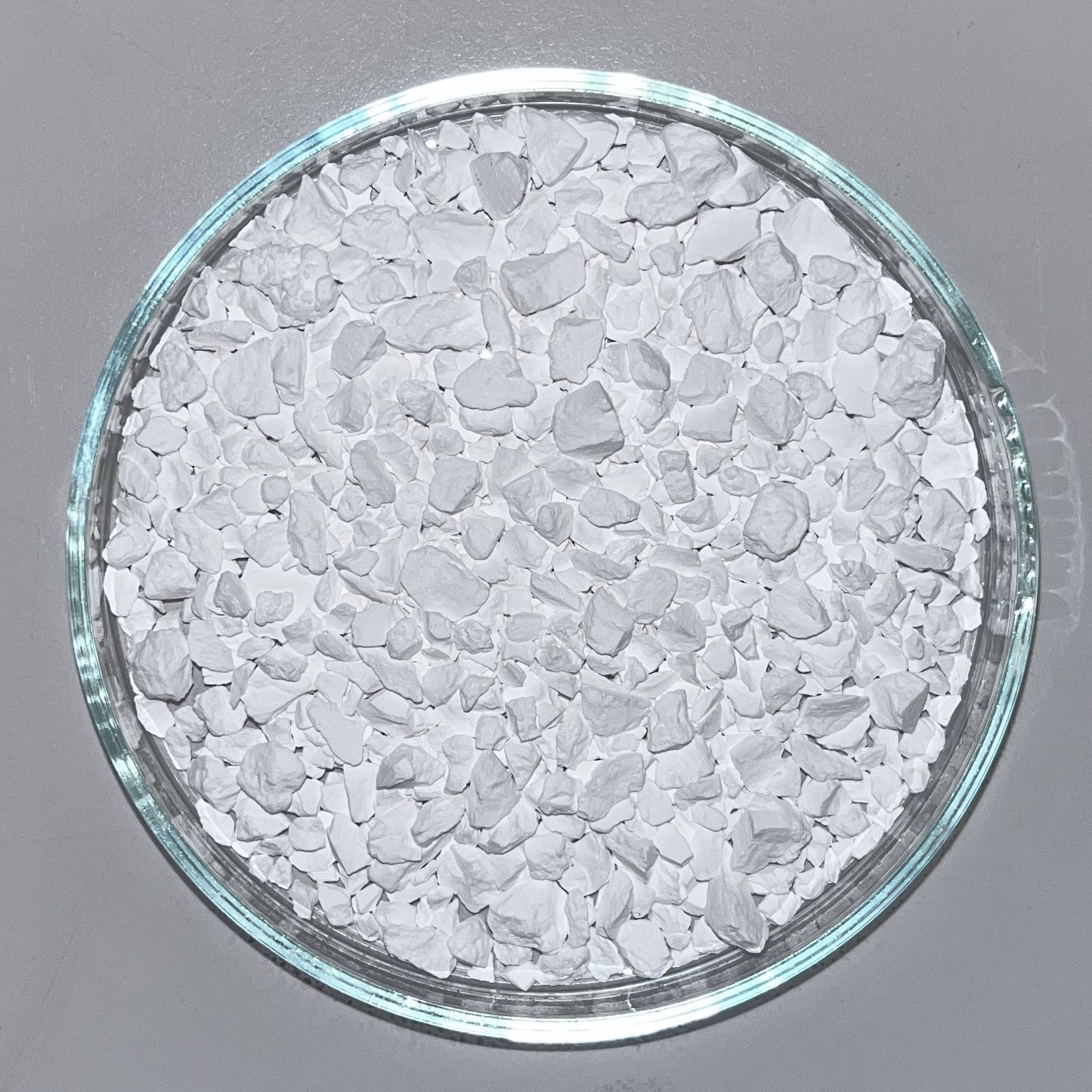
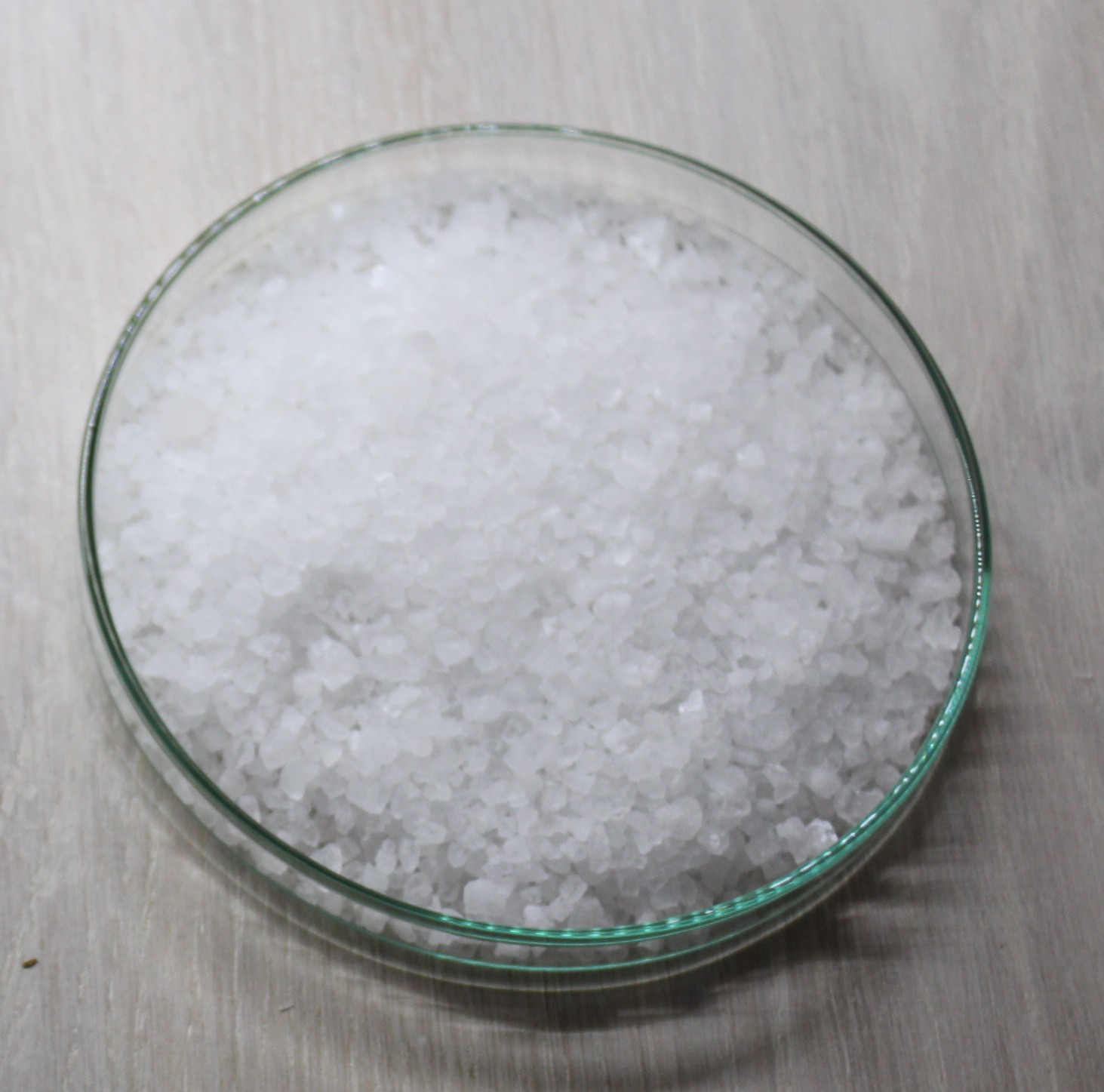

=== Sodium chloride ===
Sodium chloride is by far the most common kind of road salt. This is mainly due to its widespread use and low cost, and thanks to its large industrial infrastructure, it is used in many industrial and consumer applications. While it is common and inexpensive, its effective temperature range usually does not fall below −6 to −10 °C (21 to 14 °F), and under these temperatures, it is often counter-productive. When used in large quantities, it can also disrupt local ecosystems by heightening the salinity of bodies of water and the soil. Further, rock salt's abrasive nature erodes concrete or asphalt if used heavily.

=== Calcium chloride ===
Calcium chloride is less common compared to sodium chloride. While it does cost five times more to make than sodium chloride, it can cover a far larger area and melts ice almost three times quicker. It has recently started rising in popularity since it is not as environmentally damaging as sodium chloride, and also because of its heightened effectiveness at clearing ice. It also causes less damage to concrete surfaces in comparison to its alternatives.

=== Magnesium chloride ===
Magnesium chloride is another less common road salt. It costs $100–180 per ton in comparison to $20–30 for regular sodium chloride. It has a very low environmental impact, and is quite effective at clearing ice. However, it has been discovered that magnesium chloride causes far more damage to concrete surfaces compared to the other salts, and its use as a de-icing chemical on paved roads has largely been discontinued. It is still widespread as a highly effective dust clearer and soil stabiliser in warmer weather and on unpaved roads, and is often preferred by gardeners as it causes far less harm to plant life in comparison to other road salts.

== Environmental impact ==
The widespread use of road salt has significant environmental and infrastructural repercussions. While effective and relatively inexpensive, this practice incurs hidden costs because of its corrosive nature, leading to approximately $5 billion in annual repairs across the United States, according to the country's Environmental Protection Agency (EPA).

=== Infrastructural damage ===
Due to chlorine's high electronegativity, it is very prone to bonding with metals of lower electronegativity, and readily causes corrosion on structural, vehicular, and water infrastructure. A study in Environmental Science & Technology predicts that nearly a quarter of private wells in New York could be influenced by road salt application, resulting in great consequences to plumbing and health. Metals common in plumbing infrastructure, such as copper, lead, and iron, are especially vulnerable. When salt or brine present on the roadway is spewed up by traffic, it hits the bodywork of the vehicle resulting in further corrosion. A study regarding the effect of road salt on bodywork corrosion found that the corrosion rate during the winter periods was reduced to less than 10% on uncoated steel plates. The cosmetic corrosion damages decreased by 50% on cars used on unsalted roads compared to cars driven on salted roads. The United States EPA approximates that road salt use annually costs the government $5 billion in repairs to cars, trucks, bridges, and roads. In addition to damaging metal, road salt accelerates damage to concrete structures, not only due to its effects on the embedded steel rebar reinforcements, but also due to the acceleration of the freeze–thaw effect. This particularly affects concrete due to its porosity.

=== Environmental damage ===
One of the primary environmental concerns is the contamination of water sources. As road salt works through dissolving in snow and ice, and thereby lowering its melting point, the salt stays dissolved as the snow melt funnels into storm drains. These storm drains then lead into the sewer system, which washes into rivers, lakes and other bodies of water. Due to high levels of road salt runoff, these bodies of water can suffer freshwater salinisation, which results in numerous environmental consequences. When salinisation becomes widespread, it leads to a decrease of in-lake water levels, overuse of water in the drainage basin, encouragement of global climate change and reduced biodiversity. It is clear that high levels of chloride, an ion present in most common, inorganic road salts, are toxic to fish, amphibians, and macroinvertebrates. These salt levels could result in the extirpation of freshwater species in salinated bodies of water. The increase of salt concentrations in drinking water could also be affected, as the salt not only permeates rivers and lakes, but the ground water as well. Water starts to taste salty when chloride concentrations exceed 250 mg/L. This elevated salt level could also lead to various elecrolyte imbalances, especially hypernatremia, in people who consume the salinated tap water. This in turn can cause symptoms such as, thirst, weakness, nausea, and loss of appetite, and more severely, confusion, muscle twitching, and bleeding in or around the brain.

Road salts also contribute to the process of water eutrophication. It is the process by which nutrients such as nitrogen and chloride rapidly accumulate in water. As a result, these nutrients support the overgrowth of organisms such as algae and create algal blooms. The death of these overgrown algae and algal blooms causes a depletion in oxygen in the water when they decompose, which can kill and harm various aquatic life in the waters. Furthermore, these conditions create a positive feedback loop where it the death of algae continue to create conditions that are favorable for algae to grow in, leading to greater and greater damage.

The accumulation of salt in roadside soils adversely affects vegetation by increasing soil salinity, which can hinder plant growth and lead to the death of sensitive species. In Beijing, they found that de-icing salt resulted in the deaths of 11,000 pavement trees, 1.5 million shrubs, and 200,000 square meters of lawn grass. This degradation of plant life not only disrupts local ecosystems but also contributes to soil erosion. Additionally, wildlife attracted to the salt (such as deer and moose) can be endangered, as they may ingest harmful amounts or be drawn to roadways, increasing the likelihood of vehicle collisions. Road side pools have seen to increase the likelihood of vehicle moose collisions by nearly 80%. The term "Salt Belt" refers to regions with heavy road salt usage, predominantly in the northeastern United States. In these areas, the cumulative effects of salt application are more pronounced, leading to higher concentrations of salt in the environment and exacerbating the associated negative impacts.

== Consumption ==
Country	Annual usage (thousands of tonnes)	Year	Sources
United States	20,910	2024	
Canada	3,939.9	2024	
Germany	1,590	2010	
Japan	941	2024	
China	600	2025	
Sweden	178.7	2022	
Norway	109.6	2024	
Denmark	34.8	2025	

== Alternatives ==
Alternatives to traditional road salt are being explored to mitigate its environmental and infrastructural damage. While magnesium chloride and calcium chloride are considered less harmful to the environment, they are more expensive and may require higher application rates. Other strategies that help reduce salt usage and discharge into waterways include spraying road surfaces with brine in anticipation of snowfall, as well as using salt additives, such as sand to improve traction, dyes to aid in identification of salted areas, and agricultural by-products like beet juice, pickle juice, and molasses. Innovative solutions, such as porous pavements, have also been developed to reduce ice accumulation and minimize the need for de-icing agents. Many organic and alternative de-icers have shown to be just as effective as rock salt.

Although certain scientists propose these biodegradable solutions to be more environmentally friendly than road salts, some studies suggest that they may be more detrimental to certain essential aquatic species such as zooplankton. Zooplankton serve as one of the main sources of food for smaller fish, and are essential in making sure that energy transfer from different trophic levels occurs smoothly in the food web. Further investigation and research is still required before these alternatives can be successfully implemented. The following lists contain the most-commonly used de-icing chemicals and their typical chemical formula.

=== Salt ===
- Sodium chloride (NaCl or table salt; the most common de-icing chemical.)
- Magnesium chloride (MgCl_{2}, often added to salt to lower its working temperature, causes less damage to plant life.)
- Calcium chloride (CaCl_{2}, often added to salt to lower its working temperature, causes less damage to concrete surfaces.)
- Potassium chloride (KCl)
- Calcium magnesium acetate (CaMg_{2}(CH_{3}COO)_{6})
- Potassium acetate (CH_{3}COOK)
- Potassium formate (CHO_{2}K)
- Sodium formate (HCOONa)
- Calcium formate (Ca(HCOO)_{2}

=== Organics ===
- Urea (CO(NH_{2})_{2}), a common fertilizer
- Various agricultural by-products, generally used as additives to sodium chloride
- Methanol (CH_{4}O), scarcely used on roads
- Ethylene glycol (C_{2}H_{6}O_{2}), scarcely used on roads
- Propylene glycol (C_{3}H_{8}O_{2}), scarcely used on roads
- Glycerol (C_{3}H_{8}O_{3}), scarcely used on roads

== See also ==
- Deicing
- Winter service vehicle
- Road maintenance
- Freezing-point depression

== Notes ==
1. The shown value has been calculated by taking the percentage of salt used as road salt (41%) from the total amount of salt consumed. The exact value will thus not feature in the source document.
