= Caesium acetate =

- Structural formula

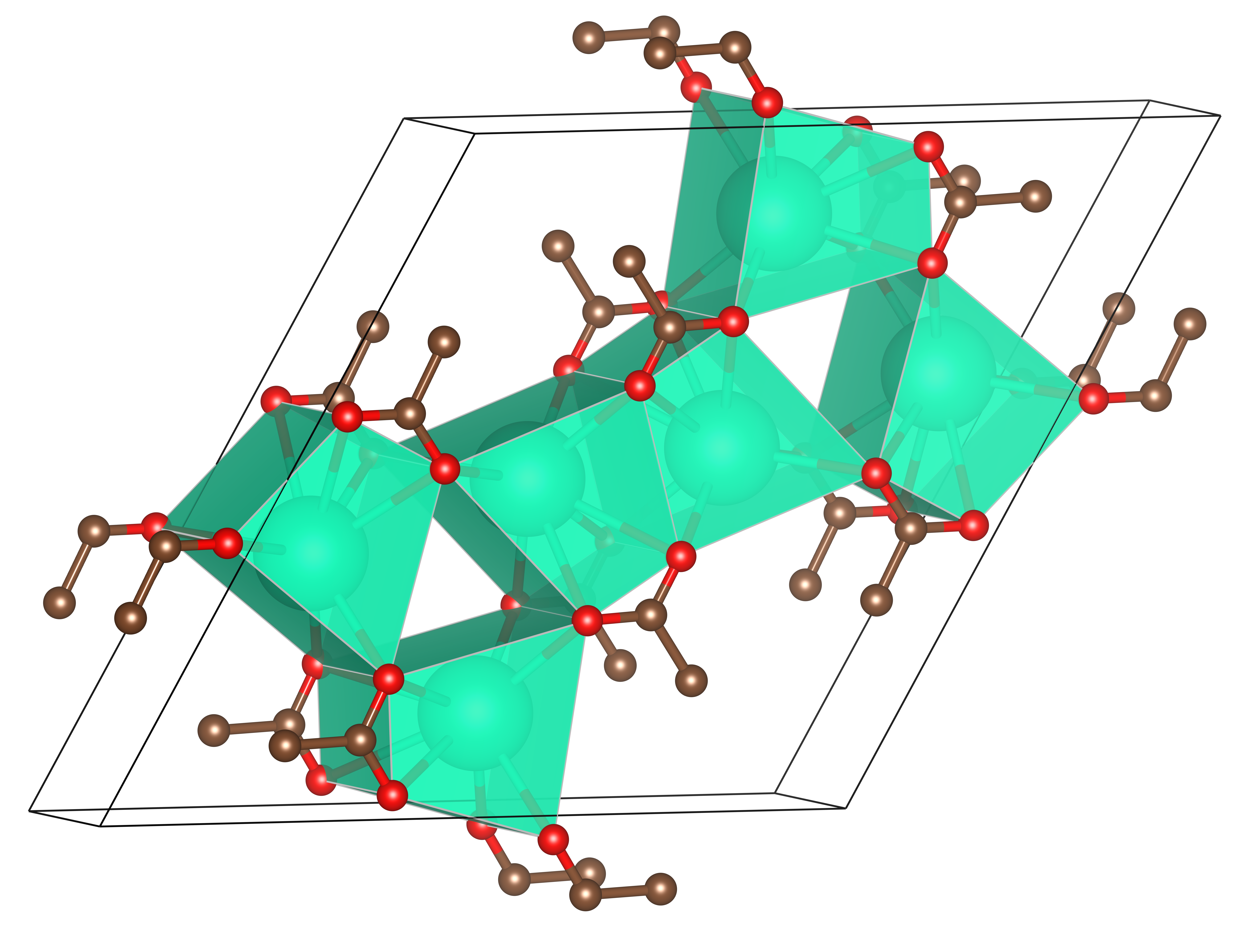
- Unit cell of anhydrous caesium acetate.

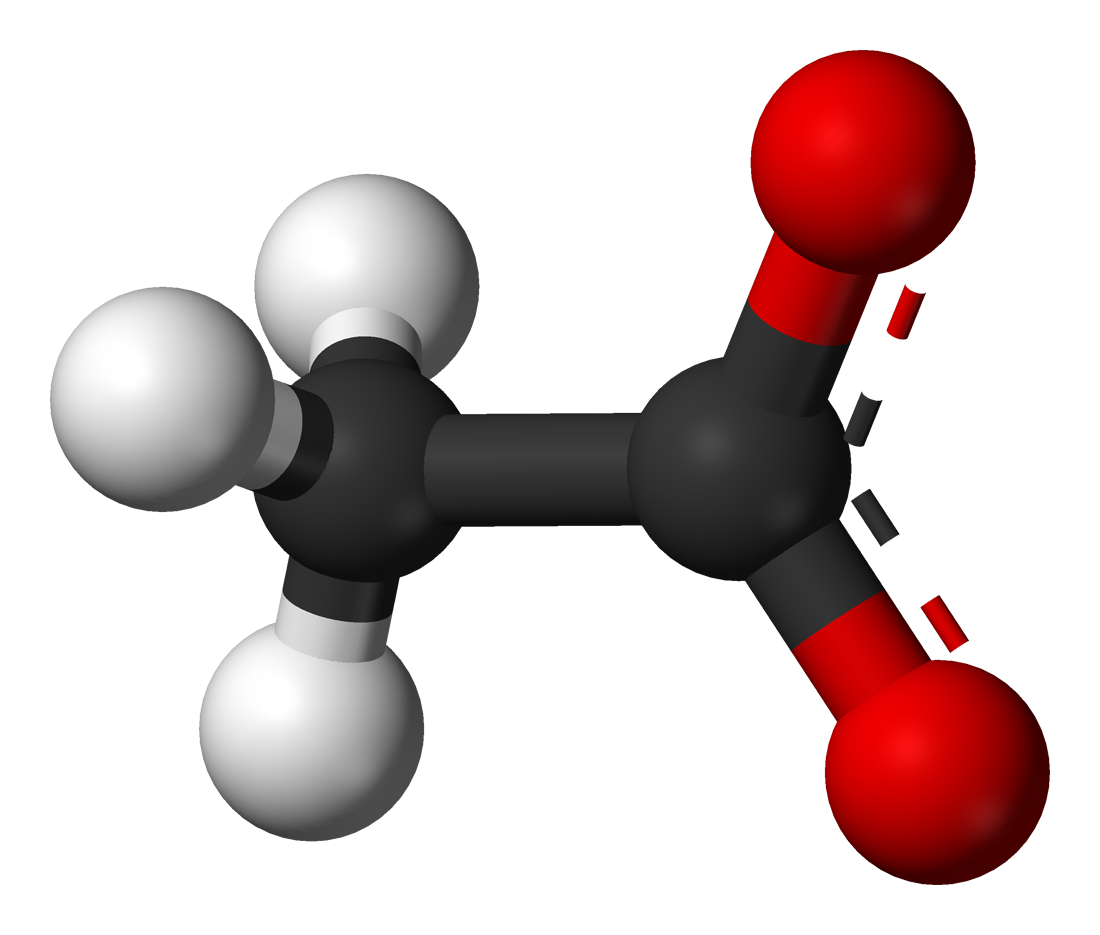

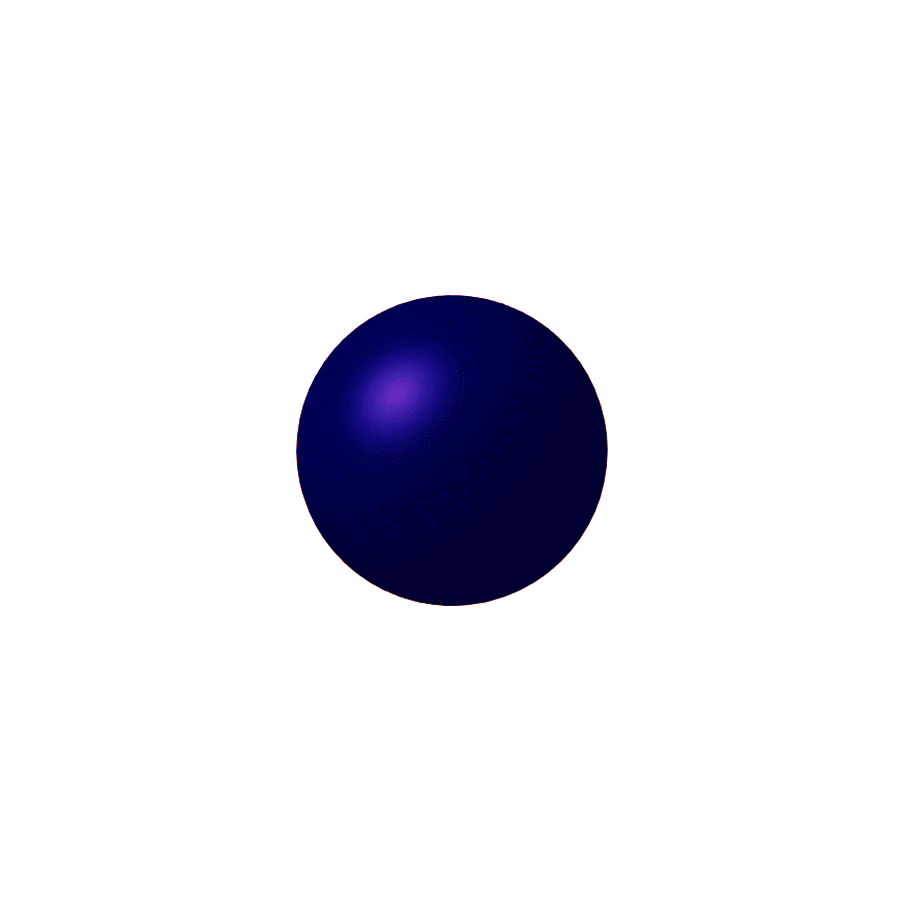

Names
- Preferred IUPAC name Caesium acetate
- Other names Cesium acetate

Identifiers
CAS Number	3396-11-0
3D model (JSmol)	Interactive image
ChemSpider	141192
ECHA InfoCard	100.020.226
PubChem CID	5152919
UNII	M74D2UJ8C9
CompTox Dashboard (EPA)	DTXSID00883971
- InChI: InChI=1S/C2H4O2.Cs/c1-2(3)4;/h1H3,(H,3,4);/q;+1/p-1 Key: ZOAIGCHJWKDIPJ-UHFFFAOYSA-M; InChI=1/C2H4O2.Cs/c1-2(3)4;/h1H3,(H,3,4);/q;+1/p-1 Key: ZOAIGCHJWKDIPJ-REWHXWOFAB
- SMILES: [Cs+].[O-]C(=O)C

Properties
Chemical formula	C_{2}H_{3}CsO_{2}
Molar mass	191.949 g/mol
Appearance	colourless, hygroscopic
Density	2.423 g/cm^{3}, solid
Melting point	194 °C (381 °F; 467 K)
Boiling point	945 °C (1,733 °F; 1,218 K)
Solubility in water	945.1 g/100 g (−2.5 °C); 1345.5 g/100 ml (88.5 °C)

Structure
Crystal structure	Primitive hexagonal
Space group	P6/m, No. 175
Lattice constant	a = 1488.0 pm, c = 397.65 pm
Lattice volume (V)	76.542 cm^{3}·mol^{−1}
Formula units (Z)	6

Hazards
- GHS labelling
Pictograms	(GHS07: Exclamation mark) (GHS08: Health hazard)
Signal word	Warning
Hazard statements	H302, H319, H361f, H373
Precautionary statements	P203, P260, P264, P264+P265, P270, P280, P301+P317, P305+P351+P338, P318, P319, P330, P337+P317, P405, P501
Flash point	Non-flammable

Related compounds
Other anions	Caesium formate
Other cations	Lithium acetate Sodium acetate Potassium acetate Rubidium acetate
- Except where otherwise noted, data are given for materials in their standard state (at 25 °C [77 °F], 100 kPa). verify (what is ?) Infobox references

Caesium acetate or cesium acetate is an ionic caesium compound with the molecular formula CH_{3}COOCs. It is a white solid that may be formed by the reaction of caesium hydroxide or caesium carbonate with acetic acid.

== Uses ==
It is used in organic synthesis. One example is in the Perkin synthesis: the formation of unsaturated cinnamic-type acids by the condensation of aromatic aldehydes with fatty acids. Replacement of the commonly used sodium acetate with caesium acetate has been shown to improve yields by up to 10 times.

It is often used to invert secondary alcohols. After converting the alcohol to a good leaving group, such as a mesylate, direct S_{N}2 substitution with the acetate produces the O-acetate with inverted stereochemistry, which can be converted back to a hydroxyl group.

Caesium acetate is occasionally used instead of caesium formate in petroleum drilling fluids.
