= Deicing =

Process of removing ice, snow, or frost from a surface

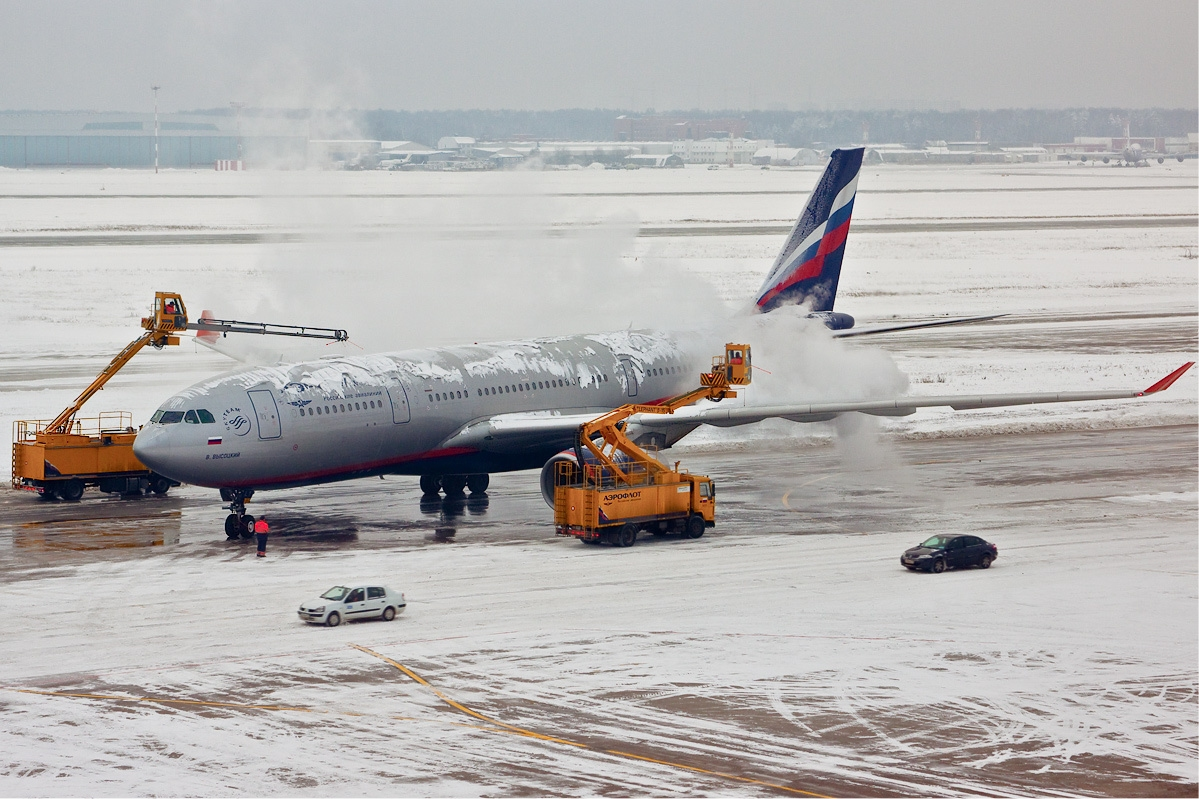
An Aeroflot Airbus A330 being de-iced at Sheremetyevo International Airport

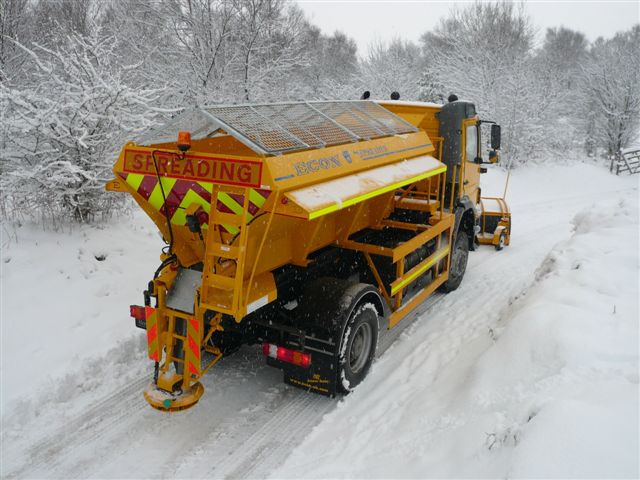
Econ Salt Spreader

De-icing is the process of removing snow, ice or frost from a surface. Anti-icing is the application of chemicals that not only de-ice but also remain on a surface and continue to delay the reformation of ice for a certain period of time, or prevent adhesion of ice to make mechanical removal easier.

De-icing can be accomplished by mechanical methods (scraping, pushing); through the application of heat; by use of dry or liquid chemicals designed to lower the freezing point of water (various salts or brines, alcohols, glycols); or by a combination of these different techniques.

== Application areas ==
=== Roadways ===
In 2013, an estimated 14 million tons of salt were used for de-icing roads in North America.

De-icing of roads has traditionally been done with salt, spread by snowplows or dump trucks designed to spread it, often mixed with sand and gravel, on slick roads. Sodium chloride (rock salt) is normally used, as it is inexpensive and readily available in large quantities. However, since salt water still freezes at −18 °C (0 °F), it is of no help when the temperature falls below this point. It also has a tendency to cause corrosion, rusting the steel used in most vehicles and the rebar in concrete bridges. Depending on the concentration, it can be toxic to some plants and animals, and some urban areas have moved away from it as a result. More recent snowmelters use other salts, such as calcium chloride and magnesium chloride, which not only depress the freezing point of water to a much lower temperature, but also produce an exothermic reaction. They are somewhat safer for sidewalks, but excess should still be removed.

More recently, organic compounds have been developed that reduce the environmental issues connected with salts and have longer residual effects when spread on roadways, usually in conjunction with salt brines or solids. These compounds are often generated as byproducts of agricultural operations such as sugar beet refining or the distillation process that produces ethanol. Other organic compounds are wood ash and a de-icing salt called calcium magnesium acetate made from roadside grass or even kitchen waste. Additionally, mixing common rock salt with some of the organic compounds and magnesium chloride results in spreadable materials that are both effective to much colder temperatures (−34 °C (−29 °F)) as well as at lower overall rates of spreading per unit area.

Several of these new compounds release very small amounts of gases into the air, which are known to be able to cause irritation of the throat and the respiratory tract in humans and animals. The majority of the human population do not experience problems although long-term effects have not been studied. People with sensitive airways, especially infants, may experience serious respiratory problems. Broader scientific studies of the respiratory health problems specifically for people with sensitive airways are lacking (in general, scientific studies have focused on non-respiratory health issues and environmental issues).

Solar road systems have been used to maintain the surface of roads above the freezing point of water. An array of pipes embedded in the road surface is used to collect solar energy in summer, transfer the heat to thermal banks and return the heat to the road in winter to maintain the surface above 0 °C (32 °F). This automated form of renewable energy collection, storage and delivery avoids the environmental issues of using chemical contaminants.

It was suggested in 2012 that superhydrophobic surfaces capable of repelling water can also be used to prevent ice accumulation leading to icephobicity. However, not every superhydrophobic surface is icephobic and the method is still under development.

=== Trains and rail switches ===
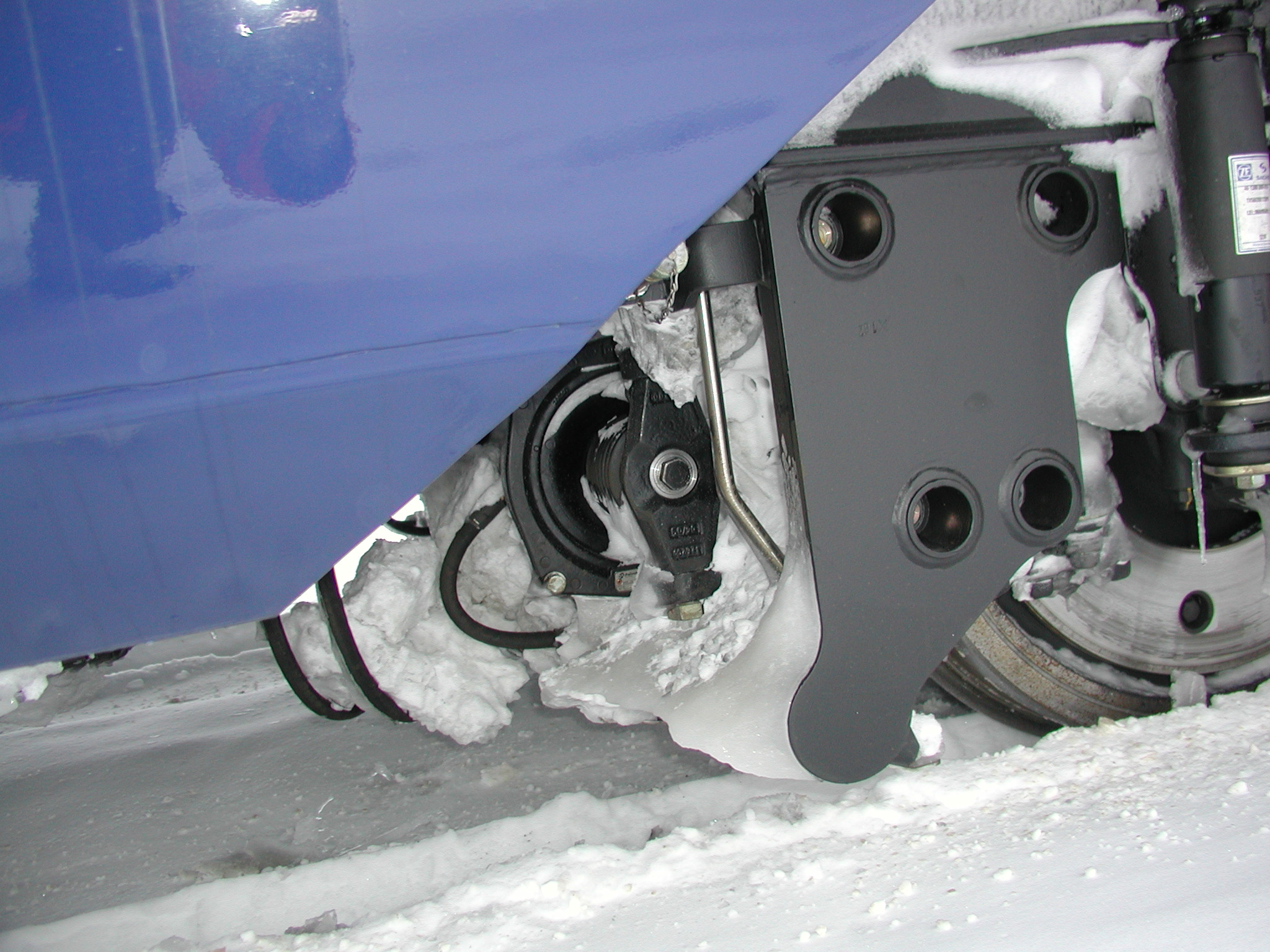
Ice build up in train brakes jeopardizes effective braking.

Trains and rail switches in Arctic regions can have significant problems with snow and ice build up. They need a constant heat source on cold days to ensure functionality. On trains it is primarily the brakes, suspension, and couplers that require heaters for de-icing. On the rails it is primarily track switches that are sensitive to ice. High-powered electrical heaters prevent ice formation and rapidly melt any ice that forms.

The heaters are preferably made of PTC material, for example PTC rubber, to avoid overheating and potentially destroying the heaters. These heaters are self-limiting and require no regulating electronics; they cannot overheat and require no overheat protection.

=== Aviation ===
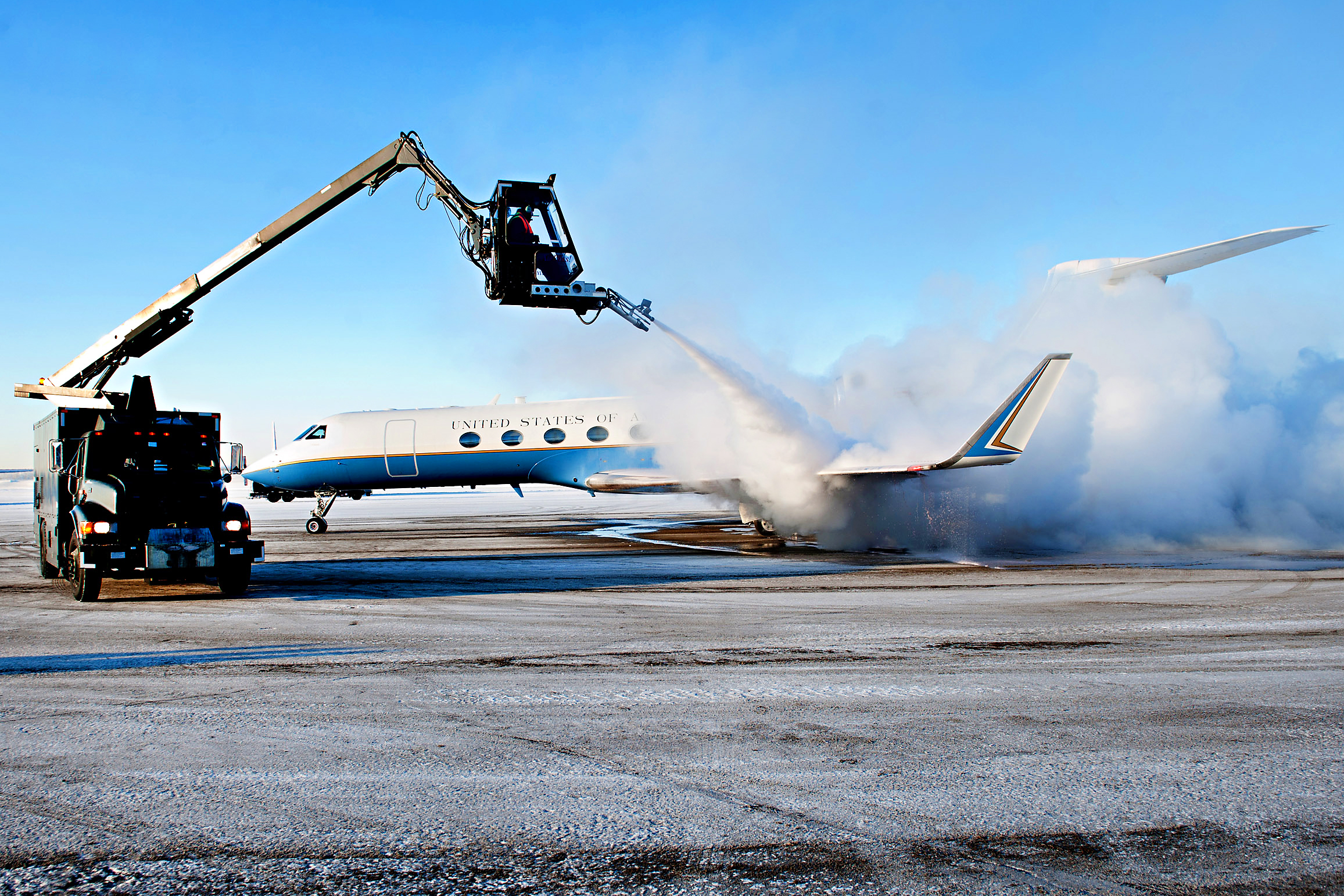
A U.S. C-37B VIP jet gets de-iced before departing Alaska in January 2012.

==== Ground de-icing of aircraft ====
On the ground, when there are freezing conditions and precipitation, de-icing an aircraft is commonly practiced. Frozen contaminants interfere with the aerodynamic properties of the vehicle. Furthermore, dislodged ice can damage the engines.

Ground de-icing methods include:

- Spraying on various aircraft deicing fluids to melt ice and prevent reformation
- Using unheated forced air to blow off loose snow and ice
- Using infrared heating to melt snow, ice, and frost without using chemicals
- Mechanical deicing using tools such as brooms, scrapers, and ropes
- Placing an aircraft in a warm hangar

==== In-flight de-icing ====
Ice can build up on aircraft in flight due to atmospheric conditions, causing potential degradation of flight performance. Large commercial aircraft almost always have in-flight ice protections systems to shed ice buildup and prevent reformation. Ice protection systems are becoming increasingly common in smaller general aviation aircraft as well.

Ice protection systems typically use one or more of the following approaches:

- pneumatic rubber "boots" on leading edges of wings and control surfaces, which expand to break off accumulated ice
- electrically heated strips on critical surfaces to prevent ice formation and melt accumulated ice
- bleed air systems which take heated air from the engines and duct them to locations where ice can accumulate
- fluid systems which "weep" de-icing fluid over wings and control surfaces via tiny holes

==== Airport pavement ====
De-icing operations for airport pavement (runways, taxiways, aprons, taxiway bridges) may involve several types of liquid and solid chemical products, including propylene glycol, ethylene glycol, calcium magnesium acetate and other organic compounds. Chloride-based compounds (e.g. salt) are not used at airports, due to their corrosive effect on aircraft and other equipment.

Urea mixtures have also been used for pavement de-icing, due to their low cost. However, urea is a significant pollutant in waterways and wildlife, as it degrades to ammonia after application, and it has largely been phased out at U.S. airports. In 2012 the U.S. Environmental Protection Agency (EPA) prohibited use of urea-based de-icers at most commercial airports.

=== Water agitator de-icer ===
Water agitators are electric motors put under water that propel up warmer water and agitate the surface with it to de-ice aquatic structures on rivers and lakes in freezing temperatures. There are also agitator bubblers that use compressed air, run through a hose, and released to agitate the water.

== De-icing chemicals ==
All de-icers share a common working mechanism: they prevent water molecules from binding above a certain temperature. The effect depends on the concentration. This temperature is below 0 °C, the freezing point of pure water (freezing point depression). Sometimes, there is an exothermic dissolution reaction that allows for an even stronger melting power. The following lists contains the most-commonly used de-icing chemicals and their typical chemical formula.

=== Salts ===
- Sodium chloride (NaCl or table salt; the most common de-icing chemical)
- Magnesium chloride (MgCl_{2}, often added to salt to lower its working temperature)
- Calcium chloride (CaCl_{2}, often added to salt to lower its working temperature, attacks concrete)
- Potassium chloride (KCl)
- Calcium magnesium acetate (CaMg_{2}(CH_{3}COO)_{6})
- Potassium acetate (CH_{3}COOK)
- Potassium formate (CHO_{2}K)
- Sodium formate (HCOONa)
- Calcium formate (Ca(HCOO)_{2})

=== Organics ===
- Urea (CO(NH_{2})_{2}), a common fertilizer
- Agricultural by-products, generally used as additives to sodium chloride
- Methanol (CH_{4}O), scarcely used on roads
- Ethylene glycol (C_{2}H_{6}O_{2}), scarcely used on roads
- Propylene glycol (C_{3}H_{8}O_{2}), scarcely used on roads
- Glycerol (C_{3}H_{8}O_{3}), scarcely used on roads

== Environmental impact and mitigation ==
De-icing agents pose significant environmental threat at airports. The benzotriazole- and tolyltriazole-based deicers are of particular interest. Even routine salts such as sodium chloride or calcium chloride leach into natural waters, affecting their salinity.

Ethylene glycol and propylene glycol exert high levels of biochemical oxygen demand (BOD) during degradation in surface waters. This process can adversely affect aquatic life by consuming oxygen needed by aquatic organisms for survival. Large quantities of dissolved oxygen (DO) in the water column are consumed when microbial populations decompose propylene glycol.

=== Recycling ===
Some airports recycle used de-icing fluid, separating water and solid contaminants, enabling reuse of the fluid in other applications. Other airports have an on-site wastewater treatment facility, and/or send collected fluid to a municipal sewage treatment plant or a commercial wastewater treatment facility.

=== Road salt ===
The use of road salt (sodium chloride) has caused a variety of environmental and infrastructure damage. Road salt has cost the US up to $5 billion annually in repair costs across the country due to salt corrosion.

Environmental concerns primarily include the contamination of waterways, endangerment of wildlife, and soil salinization. Road salt can wash into sewer systems, waterways, and eventually large bodies of water, which can lead to water salinization. This results in a variety of environmental damages, including decreasing biodiversity for various species that are not salt-tolerant, and providing a survival advantage for other species that are.

Salt can accumulate in plants by the road, which decreases plant growth and may even lead to death. In Beijing (spring of 2005), use of de-icing salt resulted in the deaths of 11,000 pavement trees, 1.5 million shrubs, and 200 square kilometres (49,000 acres) of lawn grass. Salt-rich roadside pools attract wildlife and increase the likelihood of vehicle and mammal (such as moose) collisions by nearly 80%. Birds may also consume road salt, leading to salt poisoning and potential overdose.

== See also ==
- Atmospheric icing
- Pollution
- Winter service vehicle
