= Salt Belt =

U.S. region where salt is used on roads in the winter

Map of the Salt Belt with associated states highlighted in red

The Salt Belt is a region mainly in the northeastern United States in which road salt is used in winter to control snow and ice. States in the Salt Belt include Alaska, Connecticut, Delaware, Illinois, Indiana, Iowa, Kansas, Kentucky, Maine, Maryland, Massachusetts, Michigan, Minnesota, Missouri, Nebraska, New Hampshire, New Jersey, New York, North Dakota, Ohio, Pennsylvania, Rhode Island, South Dakota, Vermont, Virginia, West Virginia, Wisconsin, and Washington, D.C. Other states such as Montana, Wyoming, Colorado, Idaho, and Utah are also considered part of the Salt Belt but use less corrosive substances.

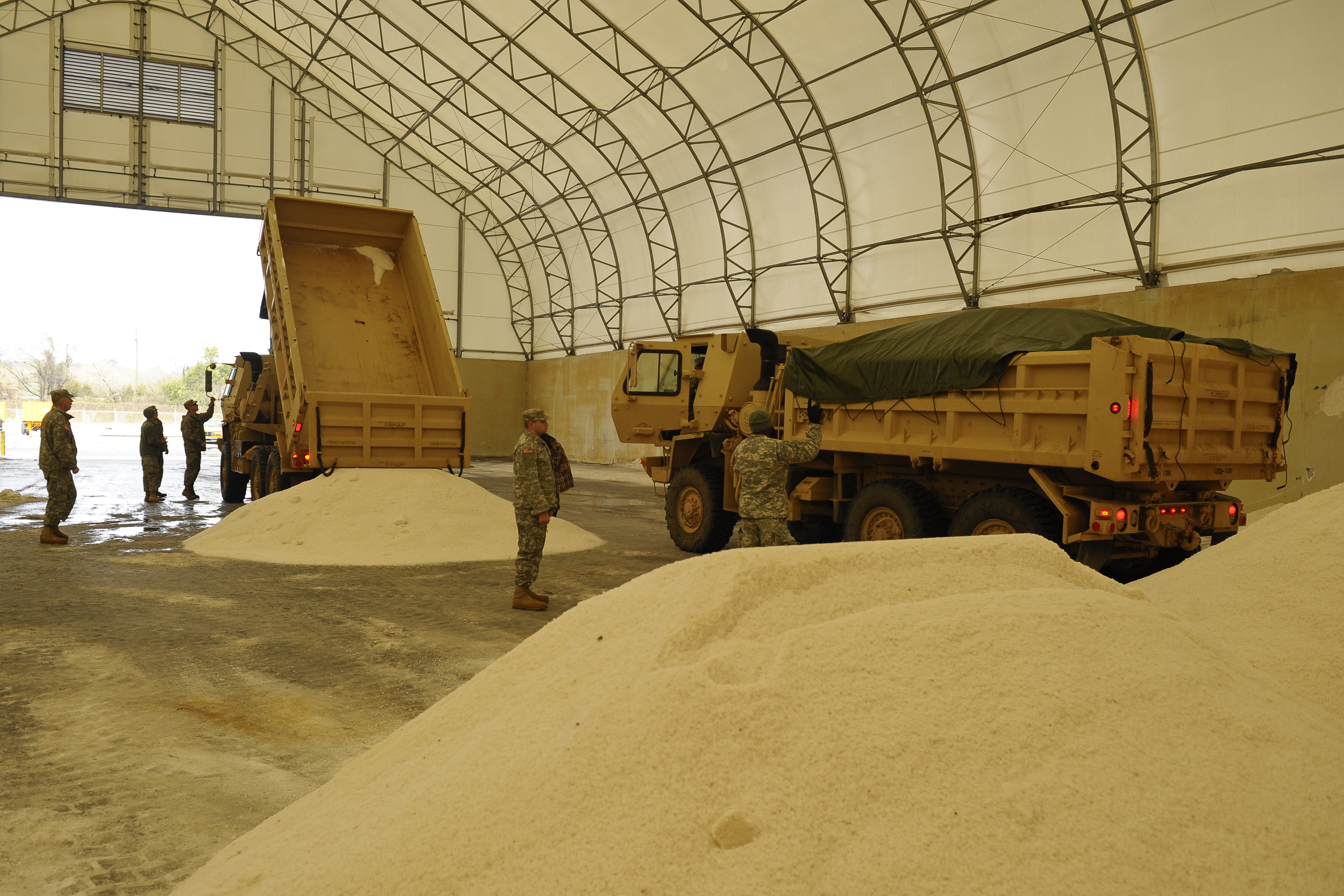
Road salt is delivered by large trucks.

Road salt is a common cause for corrosion of automobile parts, and vehicles in the Salt Belt often experience more rapid rusting compared to other regions of the country, often requiring more frequent maintenance as brake lines, electrical wiring, and structural components are adversely affected. Manufacturer recalls for corrosion issues often target only vehicles operated within Salt Belt states.

Despite its common association with corrosion, the term "Salt Belt" should not be confused with "Rust Belt," which is a similar region in the United States that has been affected by industrial decline.
