= Calcium magnesium acetate =

Chemical compound

Calcium magnesium acetate (CMA, with chemical formula C_{12}H_{18}CaMg_{2}O_{12}) is a deicer and can be used as an alternative to road salt. It is approximately as corrosive as normal tap water, and in varying concentrations can be effective in stopping road ice from forming down to around −27.5 °C (−17.5 °F) (its eutectic temperature). CMA can also be used as an H_{2}S capture agent.

== Production ==
CMA can be produced from a reaction of a magnesium/calcium compound with glacial acetic acid. If it is reacted with dolomite or dolomitic lime, acetic acid does not need to be concentrated to produce CMA. Acetic acid production requires the fermentation of organic material, which must be carried out at a pH around 6.0. Separating agents used to recover acetic acid must therefore maintain a high capacity while within this pH range. Amberlite LA-2 in 1-octanol diluent maintains nearly full capacity up to pH 6.0 and is readily regenerated with aqueous slaked dolomitic lime to form CMA, making it a good acetic acid-separating agent for CMA production.

== Use as road deicer ==
Sodium chloride road salt costs less than $50 per ton to produce but is corrosive to metals in highway structures and increases sodium concentrations in drinking water, which can lead to adverse health effects. Alternative deicing substances have been sought to alleviate these problems. CMA has been found to be an effective deicer and environmentally benign, though its production cost of $650 per ton is greater than that of road salt. Using estimates based on New York State Data, a 1992 report in the Journal of Policy Analysis and Management concluded that $615 per ton would be saved in vehicle corrosion and that $75 per ton would be saved in aesthetic damage to roadside trees if the state highway agencies switched to using CMA as a deicer instead of sodium chloride rock salt, far outweighing its initial production cost. The report also warned that excessive federal subsidization of CMA could encourage its inefficient overuse.

== Airport deicing ==
The US Federal Aviation Administration approved the use of CMA for nonaircraft deicing operations (e.g. runways, taxiways) at US airports in 1989.

== Use for H_{2}S removal ==
CMA has the ability to form highly cenospheric oxide particles when heated to high temperatures, which contain thin, porous walls that are effective at capturing hydrogen sulfide at temperatures from 700 to 1100 °C up to 90%. Integrated gasification combined cycle (IGCC) systems convert coal into clean, usable fuel gas, which then powers gas turbine systems for power generation. An essential step in this conversion process is the removal of the environmentally harmful H_{2}S and COS from the gas formed from the sulfur contained in the coal.

== Desulfurization mechanism ==
CMA (CaMg_{2}(CH_{3}COO)_{6}) decomposes around 380-400 °C to produce the following products: CaCO_{3}, MgO, CH_{3}COCH_{3}, and CO_{2}. CaCO_{3} further decomposes around 700 °C to CaO and CO_{2}. A sulfidation reaction then occurs when CaO reacts with H_{2}S under reducing conditions in a gasifier, yielding CaS and H_{2}O. CaS is finally reacted with O_{2} to produce inert CaSO_{4} which can then be disposed of.
