= Rubidium acetate =

Names
- IUPAC name Rubidium acetate
- Other names: Rubidium(I) acetate

Identifiers
CAS Number	563-67-7
3D model (JSmol)	Interactive image
ChemSpider	144356
ECHA InfoCard	100.008.415
EC Number	209-255-4
PubChem CID	23673628
UNII	86H795SZ6D
CompTox Dashboard (EPA)	DTXSID10883442
- InChI: InChI=1S/C2H4O2.Rb/c1-2(3)4;/h1H3,(H,3,4);/q;+1/p-1 Key: FOGKDYADEBOSPL-UHFFFAOYSA-M
- SMILES: CC(=O)[O-].[Rb+]

Properties
Chemical formula	CH_{3}COORb
Molar mass	144.51 g/mol
Appearance	White solid
Melting point	246 °C (475 °F; 519 K) (decomposes)
Solubility in water	86 g/100 ml (45 °C); 89.3 g/100 ml (99.4 °C)
log P	−0.561

Hazards
NFPA 704 (fire diamond)	0 1 1
- NIOSH (US health exposure limits)
PEL (Permissible)	TWA 10 mg/m^{3}

Related compounds
Other anions	Rubidium formate
Other cations	Hydrogen acetate Lithium acetate Sodium acetate Potassium acetate Caesium acetate
- Except where otherwise noted, data are given for materials in their standard state (at 25 °C [77 °F], 100 kPa). Infobox references

Rubidium acetate (CH_{3}COORb) is the rubidium salt of acetic acid. It is a white, hygroscopic solid. It can be prepared by reacting rubidium metal, rubidium carbonate, or rubidium hydroxide with acetic acid.

== Uses ==
Rubidium acetate is used as a catalyst for the polymerization of silanol terminated siloxane oligomers.
