= Sodium formate =

Chemical compound

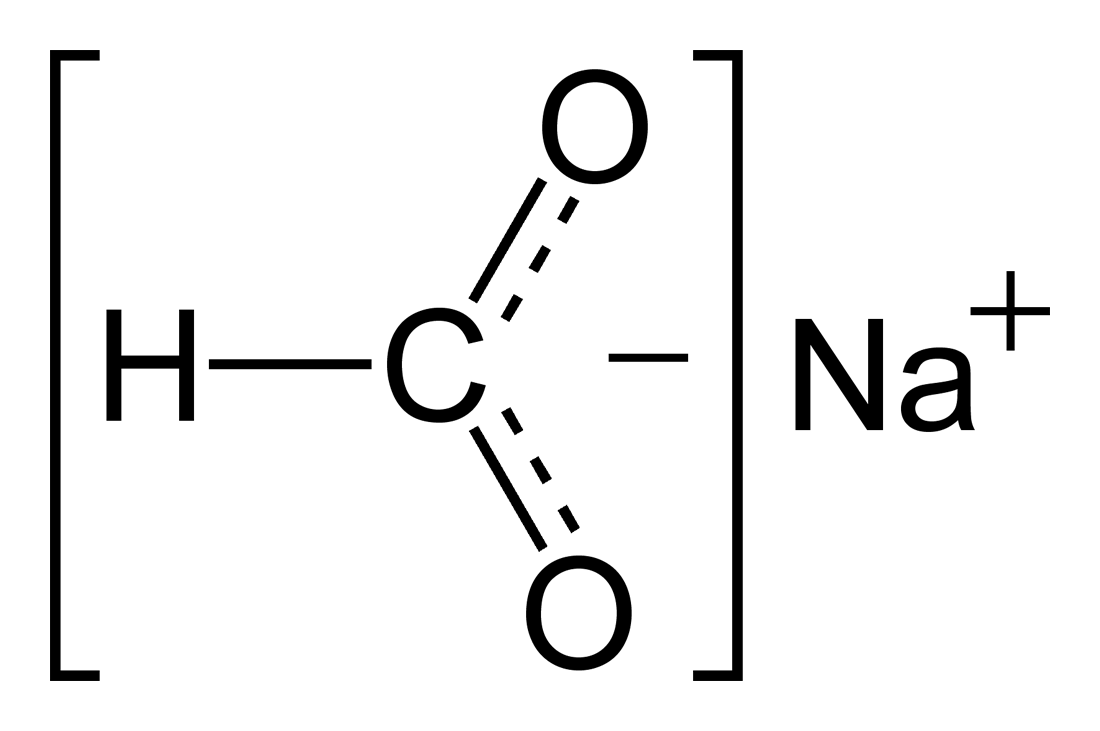
- Structural formula of sodium formate

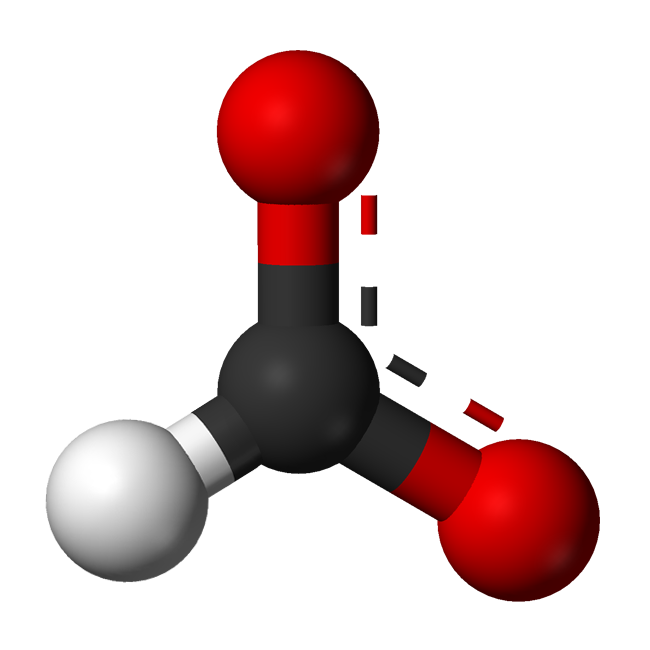
Ball-and-stick model of the formate anion
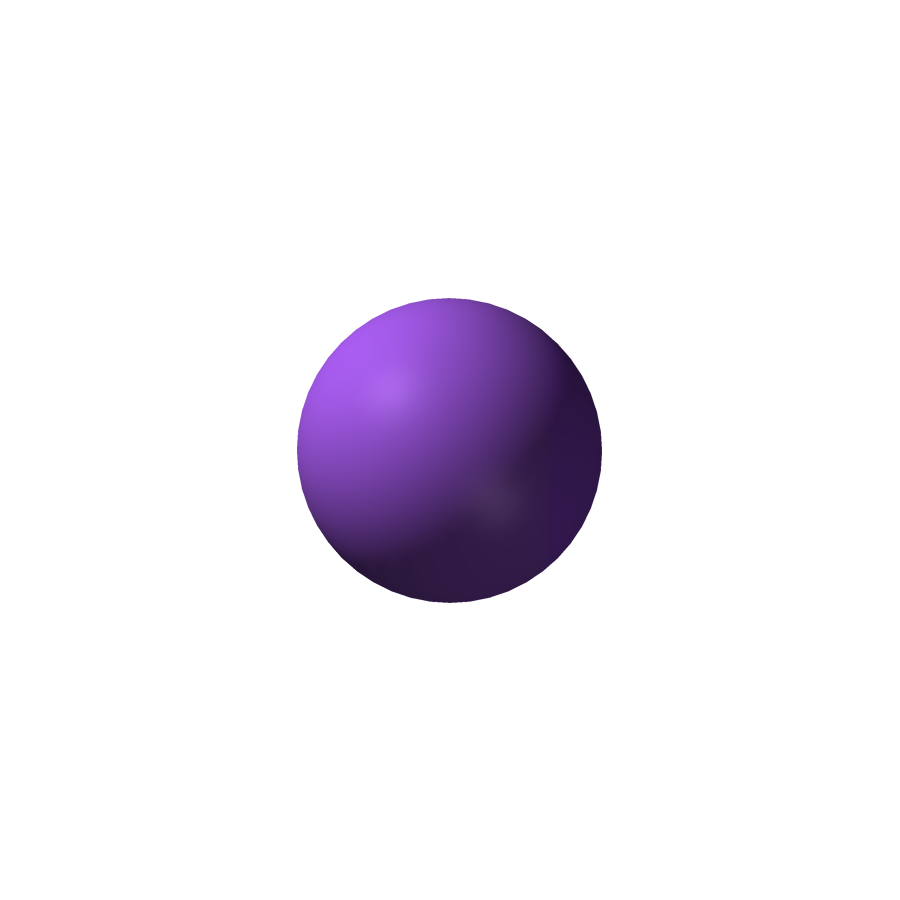

Names
- Systematic IUPAC name Sodium methanoate
- Other names: formic acid, sodium salt

Identifiers
CAS Number	141-53-7
3D model (JSmol)	Interactive image
ChEBI	CHEBI:62965
ChEMBL	ChEMBL183491
ChemSpider	8517
ECHA InfoCard	100.004.990
EC Number	205-488-0
E number	E237 (preservatives)
PubChem CID	2723810
UNII	387AD98770
CompTox Dashboard (EPA)	DTXSID2027090
- InChI: InChI=1S/CH2O2.Na/c2-1-3;/h1H,(H,2,3);/q;+1/p-1 Key: HLBBKKJFGFRGMU-UHFFFAOYSA-M; InChI=1/CH2O2.Na/c2-1-3;/h1H,(H,2,3);/q;+1/p-1 Key: HLBBKKJFGFRGMU-REWHXWOFAN
- SMILES: [Na+].[O-]C=O

Properties
Chemical formula	HCOONa
Molar mass	68.007 g·mol^{-1}
Appearance	white granules deliquescent
Density	1.92 g/cm^{3} (20 °C)
Melting point	253 °C (487 °F; 526 K)
Boiling point	decomposes
Solubility in water	43.82 g/100 mL (0 °C); 97.2 g/100 mL (20 °C); 160 g/100 mL (100 °C)
Solubility	insoluble in ether soluble in glycerol, alcohol, formic acid

Thermochemistry
Heat capacity (C)	82.7 J/mol K
Std molar entropy (S^{⦵}_{298})	103.8 J/mol K
Std enthalpy of formation (Δ_{f}H^{⦵}_{298})	−666.5 kJ/mol
Gibbs free energy (Δ_{f}G^{⦵})	−599.9 kJ/mol

Hazards
NFPA 704 (fire diamond)	1 0 0
- Except where otherwise noted, data are given for materials in their standard state (at 25 °C [77 °F], 100 kPa). verify (what is ?) Infobox references

Sodium formate, HCOONa, is the sodium salt of formic acid, HCOOH. It usually appears as a white deliquescent powder.

== Preparation ==
For commercial use, sodium formate is produced by absorbing carbon monoxide under pressure in solid sodium hydroxide at 130 °C and 6-8 bar pressure:

CO + NaOH → HCO_{2}Na

Because of the low-cost and large-scale availability of formic acid by carbonylation of methanol and hydrolysis of the resulting methyl formate, sodium formate is usually prepared by neutralizing formic acid with sodium hydroxide. Sodium formate is also unavoidably formed as a by-product in the final step of the pentaerythritol synthesis and in the crossed Cannizzaro reaction of formaldehyde with the aldol reaction product trimethylol acetaldehyde [3-hydroxy-2,2-bis(hydroxymethyl)propanal].

In the laboratory, sodium formate can be prepared by neutralizing formic acid with sodium carbonate. It can also be obtained by reacting chloroform with an alcoholic solution of sodium hydroxide.

CHCl_{3} + 4 NaOH → HCOONa + 3 NaCl + 2 H_{2}O

or by reacting sodium hydroxide with chloral hydrate.

C_{2}HCl_{3}(OH)_{2} + NaOH → CHCl_{3} + HCOONa + H_{2}O

The latter method is, in general, preferred to the former because the low aqueous solubility of CHCl_{3} makes it easier to separate out from the sodium formate solution, by fractional crystallization, than the soluble NaCl would be.

== Properties ==
=== Physical properties ===
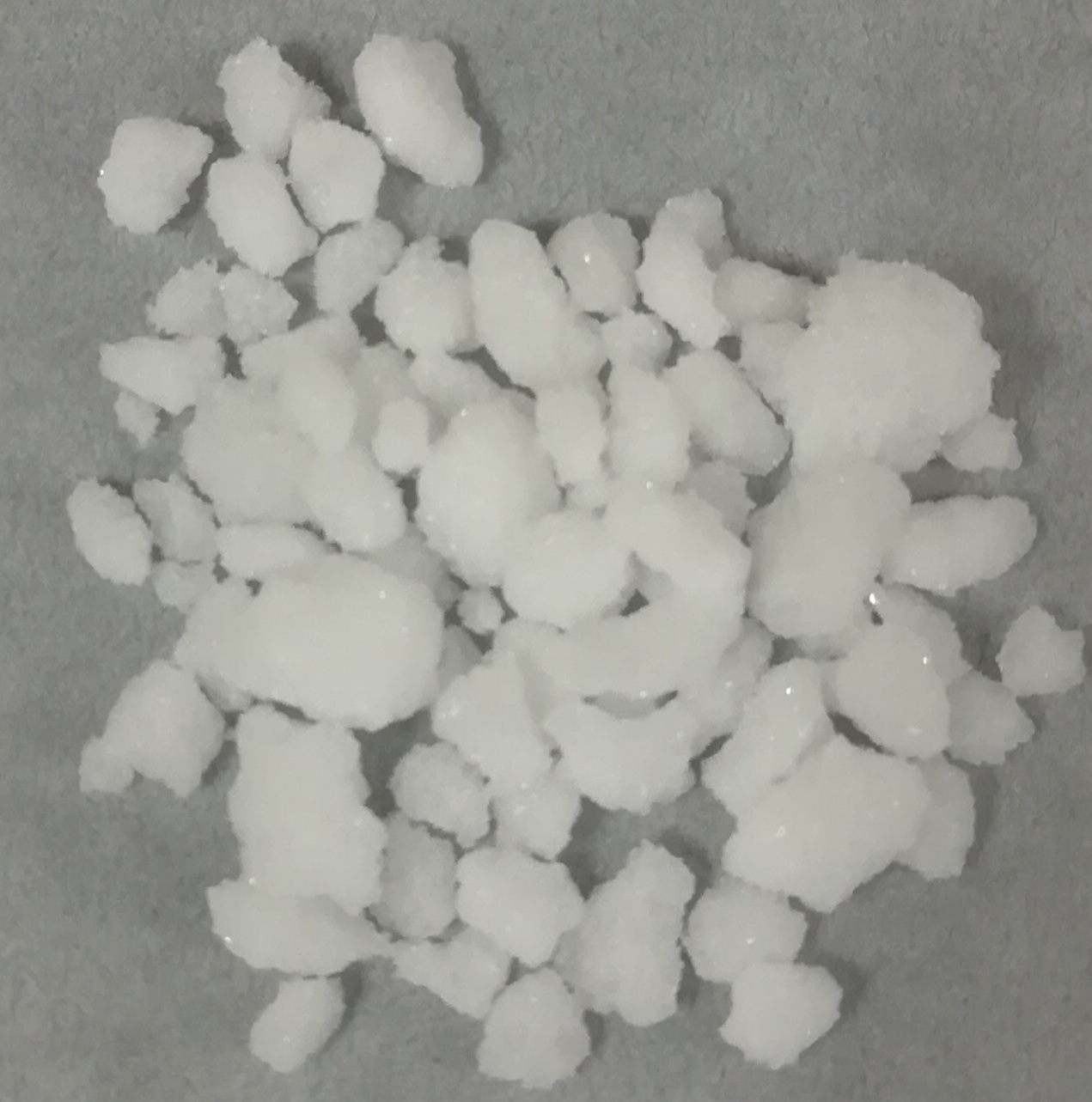
Some sodium formate dihydrate crystals

Sodium formate crystallizes in a monoclinic crystal system with the lattice parameters a = 6,19 Å, b = 6,72 Å, c = 6,49 Å and β = 121,7°.

=== Chemical properties ===
On heating, sodium formate decomposes to form sodium oxalate and hydrogen. The resulting sodium oxalate can be converted by further heating to sodium carbonate upon release of carbon monoxide:

$$\ce{2HCOONa ->[\Delta] {(COO)2Na2} + H2\!\uparrow}$$

$$\ce{(COO)2Na2 ->[{} \atop >\ \ce{290^{o}C}] {Na2CO3} + CO\!\uparrow}$$

As a salt of a weak acid (formic acid) and a strong base (sodium hydroxide) sodium formate reacts in water to form a basic solution:

$$\ce{HCOO^- + H2O <<=> HCOOH + OH^-}$$

A solution of formic acid and sodium formate can thus be used as a buffer solution.

Sodium formate is slightly water-hazardous and inhibits some species of bacteria but is degraded by others.

== Uses ==
Sodium formate is used in several fabric dyeing and printing processes. It is also used as a buffering agent for strong mineral acids to increase their pH, as a food additive (E237), and as a de-icing agent.

In structural biology, sodium formate can be used as a cryoprotectant for X-ray diffraction experiments on protein crystals, which are typically conducted at a temperature of 100 K to reduce the effects of radiation damage.

Sodium formate plays a role in the synthesis of formic acid, it is converted by sulfuric acid via the following reaction equation:

$$\mathrm{2\ HCOONa + H_2SO_4 \longrightarrow 2\ HCOOH + Na_2SO_4}$$
Sodium formate is converted with sulfuric acid to formic acid and sodium sulfate.

The urticating hair of stinging nettles contain sodium formate as well as formic acid.

Solid sodium formate is used as a non-corrosive agent at airports for de-icing of runways in mix with corrosion inhibitors and other additives, which rapidly penetrate solid snow and ice layers, detach them from the asphalt or concrete and melt the ice rapidly. Sodium formate was also used as a road deicer in the city of Ottawa from 1987 to 1988.

The high freezing point depression e.g. in comparison to the still frequently used urea (which is effective but problematic due to eutrophication) effectively prevents the re-icing, even at temperatures below −15 °C. The thawing effect of the solid sodium formate can even be increased by moistening with aqueous potassium formate or potassium acetate solutions. The degradability of sodium formate is particularly advantageous with a chemical oxygen demand (COD) of 211 mg O_{2}/g compared with the de-icing agents sodium acetate (740 mg O_{2}/g) and urea with (> 2,000 mg O_{2}/g).

Saturated sodium formate solutions (as well as mixtures of other alkali metal formates such as potassium and cesium formate) are used as important drilling and stabilizing aids in gas and oil exploration because of their relatively high density. By mixing the corresponding saturated alkali metal formate solutions any densities between 1,0 and 2,3 g/cm^{3} can be set. The saturated solutions are biocidal and long-term stable against microbial degradation. Diluted, on the other hand, they are fast and completely biodegradable. As alkali metal formates as drilling aids make it unnecessary to add solid fillers to increase the density (such as barytes) and the formate solutions can be recovered and recycled at the drilling site, formates represent an important advance in exploration technology.

== See also ==
- Sodium acetate
