= Calcium formate =

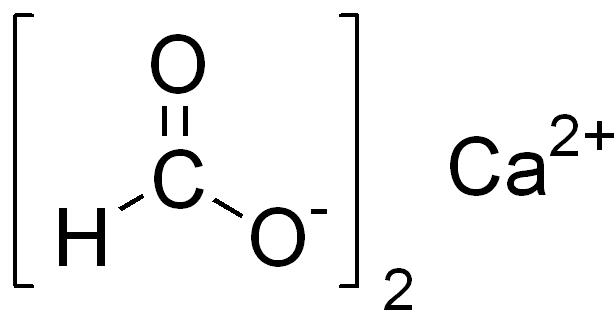
- Calcium formate

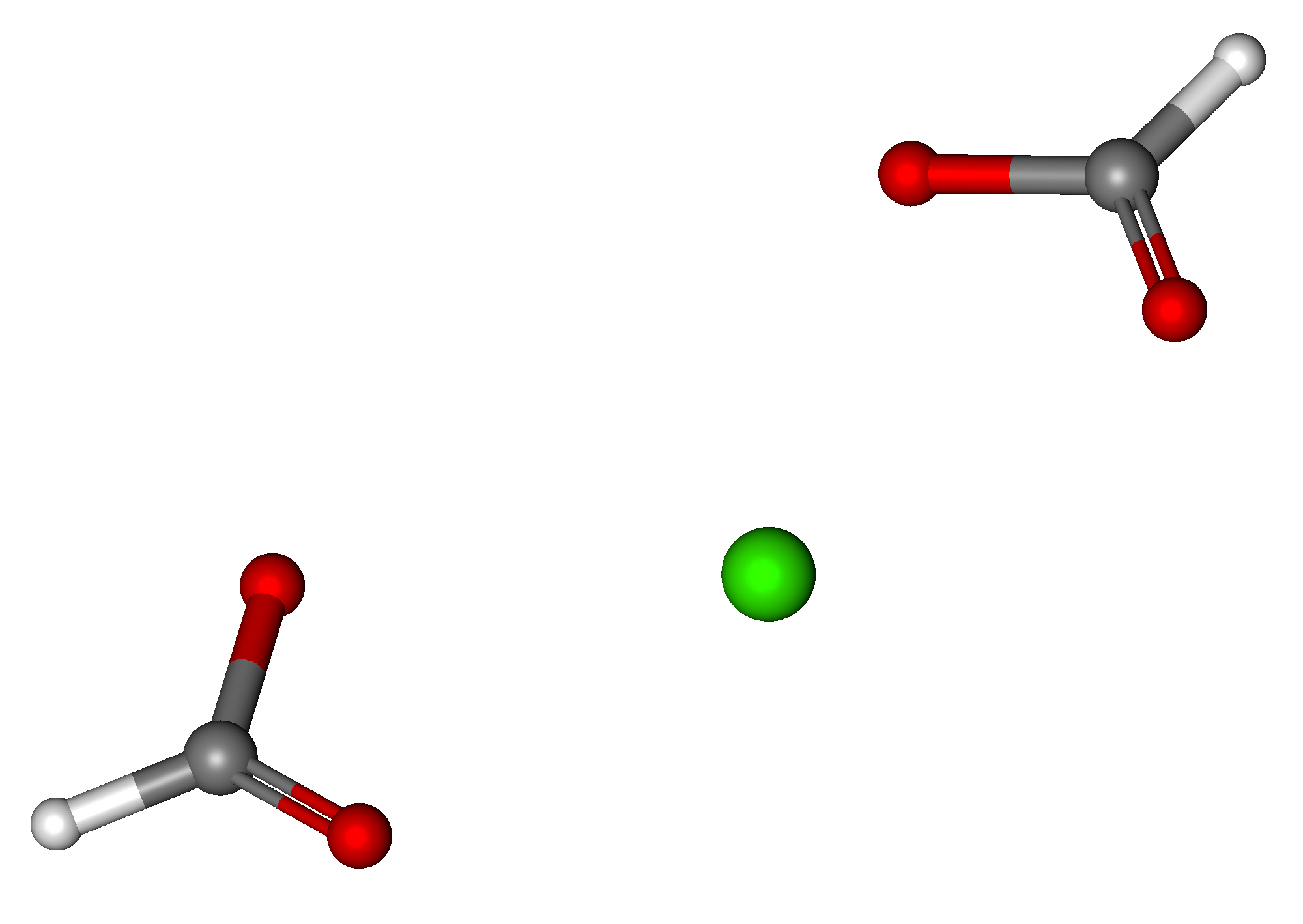

Names
- Preferred IUPAC name Calcium diformate
- Other names: Formic acid calcium salt; calcoform

Identifiers
CAS Number	544-17-2
3D model (JSmol)	Interactive image
ChEBI	CHEBI:81851
ChemSpider	10531
ECHA InfoCard	100.008.058
EC Number	208-863-7
E number	E238 (preservatives)
KEGG	C18586
PubChem CID	10997
RTECS number	LQ5600000
UNII	NP3JD65NPY
CompTox Dashboard (EPA)	DTXSID0027193
- InChI: InChI=1S/2CH2O2.Ca/c2*2-1-3;/h2*1H,(H,2,3);/q;;+2/p-2 Key: CBOCVOKPQGJKKJ-UHFFFAOYSA-L; InChI=1/2CH2O2.Ca/c2*2-1-3;/h2*1H,(H,2,3);/q;;+2/p-2 Key: CBOCVOKPQGJKKJ-NUQVWONBAS
- SMILES: [Ca+2].[O-]C=O.[O-]C=O

Properties
Chemical formula	Ca(HCO_{2})_{2}
Molar mass	130.112 g·mol^{−1}
Appearance	white-to-yellow crystals or crystalline powder
Odor	smells slightly like acetic acid
Density	2.02 g/cm^{3}
Melting point	decomposes at 300 °C
Solubility in water	16.1 g/100 g (0 °C); 18.4 g/100 g (100 °C)
Solubility	insoluble in ethanol methanol: 0.27 g/100 g (15 °C); 0.23 g/100 g (66 °C)

Hazards
- GHS labelling
Pictograms	(GHS05: Corrosive) (GHS07: Exclamation mark)
Signal word	Danger
Hazard statements	H318
Precautionary statements	P264, P280, P305+P351+P338, P310, P337+P313
NFPA 704 (fire diamond)	1 0 0
- Lethal dose or concentration (LD, LC)
LD_{50} (median dose)	rats: 2640 mg/kg (oral), 154 mg/kg (IV)

Related compounds
Other anions	Calcium acetate Calcium propanoate
Other cations	Sodium formate Lithium formate
- Except where otherwise noted, data are given for materials in their standard state (at 25 °C [77 °F], 100 kPa). verify (what is ?) Infobox references

Calcium formate is the calcium salt of formic acid. It is also known as E238. Under this E number it is used as an animal feed preservative within EU, but not in foods intended for people.

Calcium formate is stable at room temperature, is flammable and forms orthorhombic crystals. The mineral form is very rare and called formicaite, and is known from a few boron deposits.

== Uses ==
Calcium formate is used within EU as an animal feed preservative. It acidifies the feed thus preventing microbe growth and increasing shelf life. About 15 g of calcium formate addition per kg of feed lowers its pH by one. 15 g/kg is the maximum recommended feed concentration within EU – this level is thought to be safe for pigs, chickens, fish and ruminants. The compound is not environmentally harmful in feed use at these levels. Calcium formate prevents the growth of bacteria such as E. coli, Pseudomonas aeruginosa, Staphylococcus aureus and Enterococcus hirae in growth mediums. It also prevents the growth of fungi like Aspergillus niger and Candida albicans. However, the relevance of these experimental observations to feed preservation is not known.

Calcium formate is used as a masking agent in the chrome tanning of leather. Calcium formate in tannage formulation promotes faster, more efficient leather penetration of the chrome. Calcium formate can also be used as a replacement for formic acid in the pickling operation.

As a grout and cement additive, calcium formate imparts a number of desirable properties in the final product, e.g. increased hardness and decreased setting time. Its addition is desirable for work at low temperature and for inhibition of corrosion of metal substrates within cement/grout. It is also effective in the prevention of efflorescence. In drywall (gypsum board), calcium formate can function as a fire retardant.

Calcium formate and urea mixtures are effective deicers, and tend to cause less corrosion of steel and cement surfaces relative to some other deicers.

In plant cultivation, calcium formate is finding use as a soluble calcium carrier in situations where neither chlorine nor nitrogen are wanted.

== Research ==
Calcium formate seems to be safe as a calcium supplement for people with one time doses of 3.9 g (1200 of calcium) per day. Increases in blood formate concentration have been observed with such doses, but in healthy subjects the formate does not accumulate, and is quickly metabolized. Calcium formate is shown to be more readily absorbed form of calcium than calcium carbonate and calcium citrate. No optic nerve damage has been observed with calcium formate supplementation – along with formaldehyde, formate is a major metabolic product of methanol, which can cause blindness upon ingestion.

Calcium formate could be used to remove environmentally harmful (see acid rain) sulfur oxides (SO_{X}) from fossil fuel exhausts of e.g. power plants. Calcium formate is added to wet calcium carbonate to promote the formation of gypsum when exhaust is run through it, which binds sulfur oxides and thus reduces their release to the environment. This process is called wet flue gas desulfurization (WFGS). Calcium formate seems to be more effective than or almost equally as effective as some other industrially used WFGS agents.

== Production ==
Calcium formate is formed as a co-product during trimethylolpropane production. Hydrated lime (calcium hydroxide) is used as the source of calcium. Butyraldehyde and formaldehyde react in a water solution in the presence of a basic catalyst, forming an unstable intermediate product, dimethylol butyraldehyde (DIMBA). DIMBA reacts further with formaldehyde to give trimethylolpropane and calcium formate. Calcium formate is separated from the solution, heat treated to remove formaldehyde and then dried.

Calcium formate can also be made from calcium hydroxide and carbon monoxide at high pressure and temperature – e.g., at 180 °C and 35 atm. It may also be made from calcium chloride and formic acid.

== Safety ==
Pure calcium formate powder irritates eyes severely, but causes no skin irritation. Powder inhalation can be dangerous. The compound has a stinging taste. Ingesting liquids with high calcium formate concentrations cause severe gastrointestinal lesions.
