= Sodium acetate =

Chemical compound

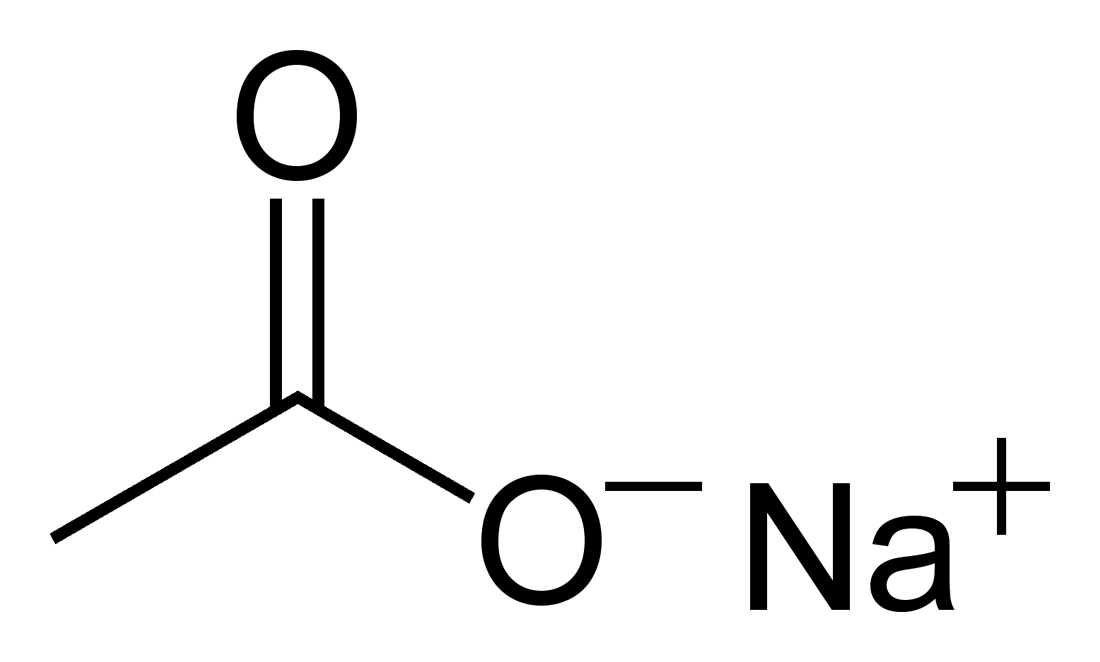
- Skeletal formula of sodium acetate

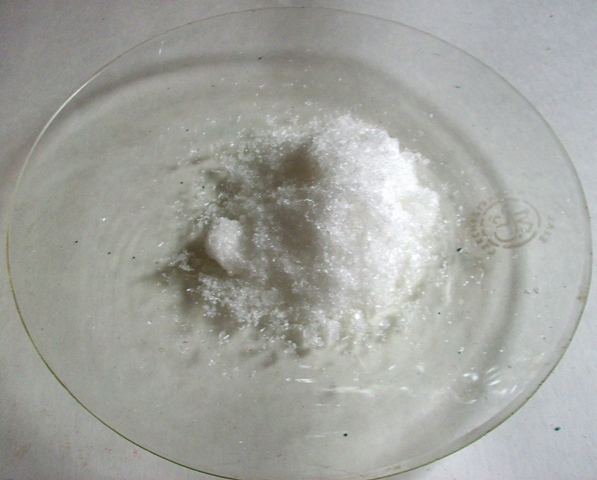
- Sodium acetate

Names
- Preferred IUPAC name Sodium acetate
- Systematic IUPAC name Sodium ethanoate
- Other names Hot ice (sodium acetate trihydrate)

Identifiers
CAS Number	anhydrous: 127-09-3; trihydrate: 6131-90-4
3D model (JSmol)	anhydrous: Interactive image
Abbreviations	AcONa; NaOAc
Beilstein Reference	3595639
ChEBI	anhydrous: CHEBI:32954; trihydrate: CHEBI:32138
ChEMBL	anhydrous: ChEMBL1354
ChemSpider	anhydrous: 29105
DrugBank	anhydrous: DB09395
ECHA InfoCard	100.004.386
EC Number	anhydrous: 204-823-8
E number	E262 (preservatives)
Gmelin Reference	20502
KEGG	trihydrate: D01779
PubChem CID	anhydrous: 517045; trihydrate: 23665404
RTECS number	anhydrous: AJ4300010 (anhydrous) AJ4580000
UNII	anhydrous: NVG71ZZ7P0; trihydrate: 4550K0SC9B
CompTox Dashboard (EPA)	anhydrous: DTXSID2027044
- InChI: InChI=1S/C2H4O2.Na/c1-2(3)4;/h1H3,(H,3,4);/q;+1/p-1 Key: VMHLLURERBWHNL-UHFFFAOYSA-M; anhydrous: InChI=1/C2H4O2.Na/c1-2(3)4;/h1H3,(H,3,4);/q;+1/p-1 Key: VMHLLURERBWHNL-REWHXWOFAT
- SMILES: anhydrous: [Na+].[O-]C(=O)C

Properties
Chemical formula	C_{2}H_{3}NaO_{2}
Molar mass	82.034 g·mol^{−1}
Appearance	White deliquescent powder or colorless crystals
Odor	Vinegar (acetic acid) odor when heated to decomposition
Density	1.528 g/cm^{3} (20 °C, anhydrous); 1.45 g/cm^{3} (20 °C, trihydrate)
Melting point	324 °C (615 °F; 597 K) (anhydrous); 58 °C (136 °F; 331 K) (trihydrate)
Boiling point	881.4 °C (1,618.5 °F; 1,154.5 K) (anhydrous); 122 °C (252 °F; 395 K) (trihydrate) decomposes
Solubility in water	Anhydrous: 119 g/100 mL (0 °C); 123.3 g/100 mL (20 °C); 125.5 g/100 mL (30 °C); 137.2 g/100 mL (60 °C); 162.9 g/100 mL (100 °C); Trihydrate: 32.9 g/100 mL (-10 °C); 36.2 g/100 mL (0 °C); 46.4 g/100 mL (20 °C); 82 g/100 mL (50 °C)
Solubility	Soluble in alcohol, hydrazine, SO_{2}
Solubility in methanol	16 g/100 g (15 °C); 16.55 g/100 g (67.7 °C)
Solubility in ethanol	Trihydrate: 5.3 g/100 mL
Solubility in acetone	0.5 g/kg (15 °C)
Acidity (pK_{a})	24 (20 °C); 4.75 (when mixed with CH_{3}COOH as a buffer)
Basicity (pK_{b})	9.25
Magnetic susceptibility (χ)	−37.6·10^{−6} cm^{3}/mol
Refractive index (n_{D})	1.464

Structure
Crystal structure	Monoclinic

Thermochemistry
Heat capacity (C)	100.83 J/(mol·K) (anhydrous); 229 J/(mol·K) (trihydrate)
Std molar entropy (S^{⦵}_{298})	138.1 J/(mol·K) (anhydrous); 262 J/(mol·K) (trihydrate)
Std enthalpy of formation (Δ_{f}H^{⦵}_{298})	−709.32 kJ/mol (anhydrous) −1604 kJ/mol (trihydrate)
Gibbs free energy (Δ_{f}G^{⦵})	−607.7 kJ/mol (anhydrous)

Pharmacology
ATC code	B05XA08 (WHO)

Hazards
- Occupational safety and health (OHS/OSH)
Main hazards	Irritant
NFPA 704 (fire diamond)	0 1 1
Flash point	>250 °C (482 °F; 523 K)
Autoignition temperature	607 °C (1,125 °F; 880 K)
- Lethal dose or concentration (LD, LC)
LD_{50} (median dose)	3530 mg/kg (oral, rat) >10000 mg/kg (rabbit, dermal)
LC_{50} (median concentration)	>30 g/m^{3} (rat, 1 h)
Safety data sheet (SDS)	Fisher Scientific

Related compounds
Other anions	Sodium formate Sodium propionate Sodium butyrate
Other cations	Lithium acetate Potassium acetate Rubidium acetate Cesium acetate Calcium acetate
Related compounds	Sodium diacetate
- Except where otherwise noted, data are given for materials in their standard state (at 25 °C [77 °F], 100 kPa). verify (what is ?) Infobox references

Sodium acetate is a chemical compound with formula CH_{3}COONa, also abbreviated NaOAc. It is the sodium salt of acetic acid. This salt is colorless, deliquescent, and hygroscopic.

== Applications ==
=== Biochemistry and biotechnology ===
Buffer solutions composed of sodium acetate and acetic acid are routinely used to maintain pH in a mildly acidic range (pH 4–6). It is also used as a carbon source for culturing bacteria and industrial waste treatment. Sodium acetate can also be useful for increasing yields of DNA isolation by ethanol precipitation.

=== Industrial ===
Sodium acetate is used in the textile industry to neutralize sulfuric acid waste streams and also as a photoresist while using aniline dyes. It is also a pickling agent in chrome tanning and helps to impede vulcanization of chloroprene in synthetic rubber production. It is also used to reduce static electricity during production of disposable cotton pads.

=== Food ===
Anhydrous sodium acetate is widely used as a shelf-life extending agent and pH control agent. It is safe to eat at low concentration.

=== Heating pad ===
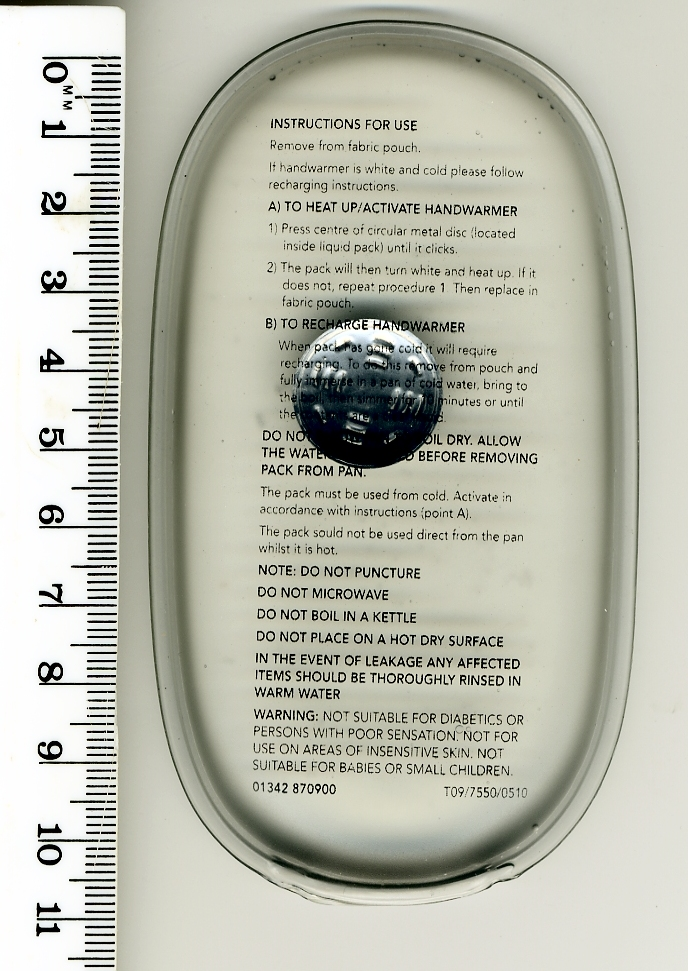
A hand warmer contains a supersaturated solution of sodium acetate which releases heat upon crystallization

Sodium acetate is also used in heating pads, hand warmers, and "hot ice". A supersaturated solution of sodium acetate in water is supplied with a device to initiate crystallization, a process that releases substantial heat.

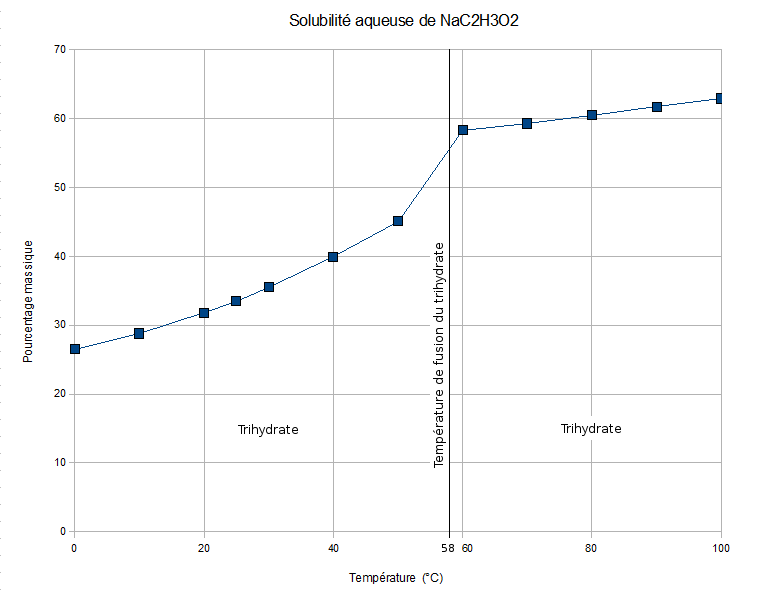
Solubility from CRC Handbook

Sodium acetate trihydrate crystals melt at 58–58.4 °C (136.4–137.1 °F), and the liquid sodium acetate dissolves in the released water of crystallization. When heated past the melting point and subsequently allowed to cool, the aqueous solution becomes supersaturated. This solution is capable of cooling to room temperature without forming crystals. By pressing on a metal disc within the heating pad, a nucleation center is formed, causing the solution to crystallize back into solid sodium acetate trihydrate. The process of crystallization is exothermic. The latent heat of fusion is about 264–289 kJ/kg. Unlike some types of heat packs, such as those dependent upon irreversible chemical reactions, a sodium acetate heat pack can be easily reused by immersing the pack in boiling water for a few minutes, until the crystals are completely dissolved, and allowing the pack to slowly cool to room temperature.

== Preparation ==
Hydrated sodium acetate is produced commercially by treating acetic acid with aqueous sodium hydroxide.

CH_{3}CO_{2}H + NaOH → CH_{3}CO_{2}Na + H_{2}O

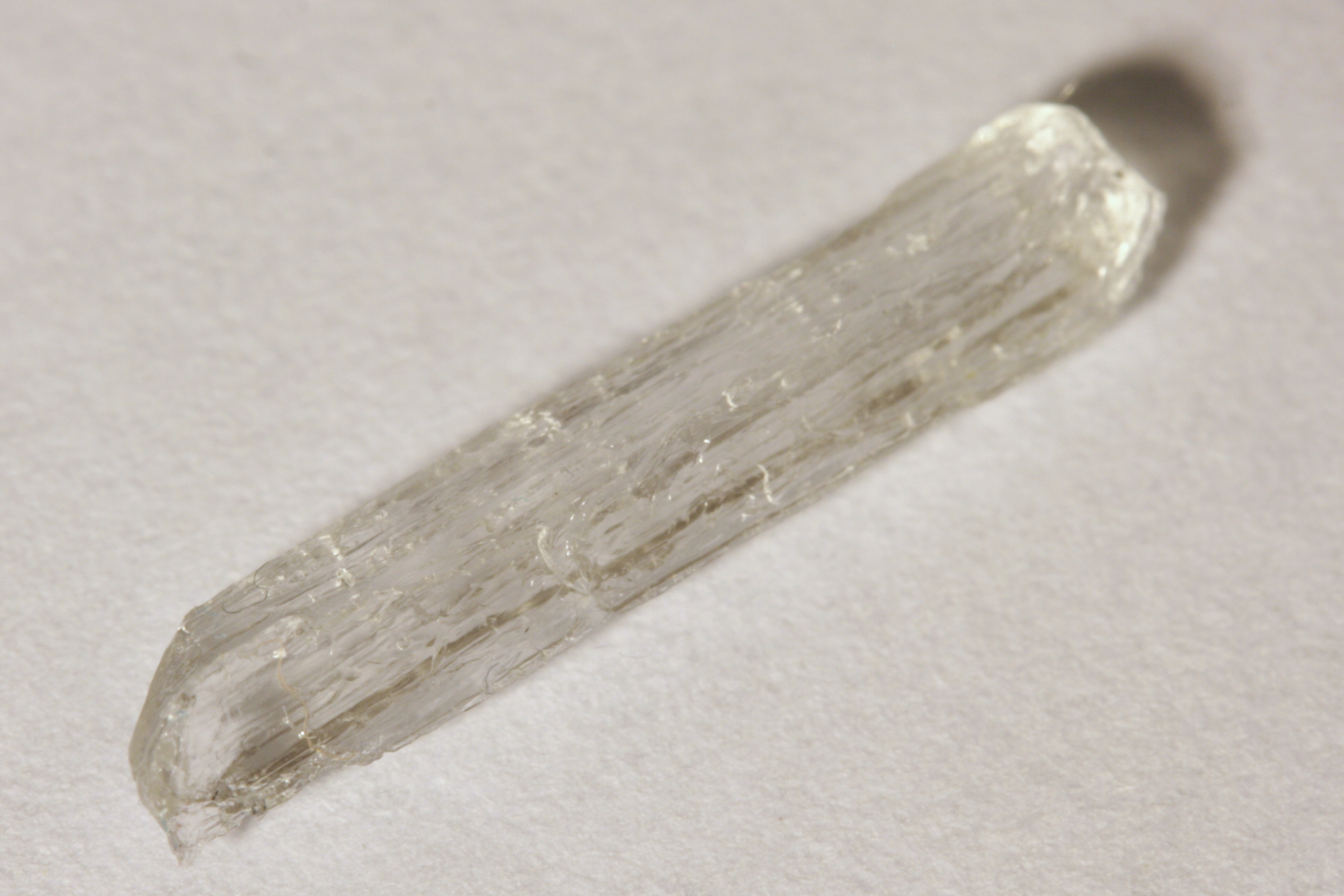
A crystal of sodium acetate trihydrate (length 1.7 centimetres)

== Structure ==
The crystal structure of anhydrous sodium acetate has been described as alternating sodium-carboxylate and methyl group layers. Sodium acetate trihydrate's structure consists of distorted octahedral coordination at sodium. Adjacent octahedra share edges to form one-dimensional chains. Hydrogen bonding in two dimensions between acetate ions and water of hydration links the chains into a three-dimensional network.

Comparison of anhydrous and trihydrate crystal structures
Degree of hydration	Anhydrous	Trihydrate
Na coordination		
Strongly bonded aggregation	2D sheet	1D chain
Weakly bonded aggregation	sheets stacked with hydrophobic surfaces in contact	chains linked by hydrogen bonds (one chain highlighted in light blue)

== Reactions ==
Sodium acetate can be alkylated to form esters. For example, treatment with bromoethane gives ethyl acetate:

CH_{3}CO_{2}Na + BrC_{2}H_{5} → CH_{3}CO_{2}C_{2}H_{5} + NaBr

Sodium acetate undergoes decarboxylation to form methane and carbon dioxide.
