= Lithium acetate =

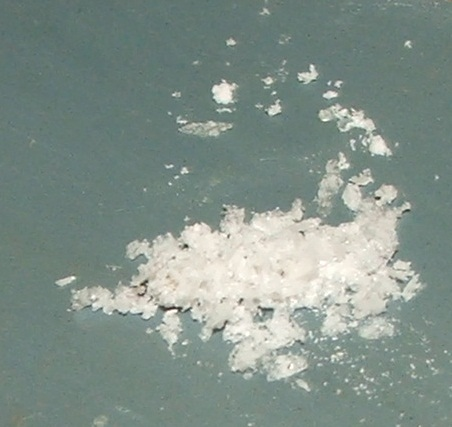

Names
- Preferred IUPAC name Lithium acetate

Identifiers
| CAS Number | 546-89-4 (anhydrous); 6108-17-4 (dihydrate) |
| 3D model (JSmol) | Interactive image |
| ChEBI | CHEBI:CHEBI:63045 |
| ChemSpider | 10562 |
| ECHA InfoCard | 100.008.105 |
| EC Number | 208-914-3 |
| KEGG | D08134 |
| MeSH | C488804 |
| PubChem CID | 3474584 |
| RTECS number | AI545000 |
| UNII | H4278O5FLV |
| CompTox Dashboard (EPA) | DTXSID00883436 |
- InChI: InChI=1S/C2H4O2.Li/c1-2(3)4;/h1H3,(H,3,4);/q;+1/p-1 Key: XIXADJRWDQXREU-UHFFFAOYSA-M; InChI=1/C2H4O2.Li/c1-2(3)4;/h1H3,(H,3,4);/q;+1/p-1 Key: XIXADJRWDQXREU-REWHXWOFAX
- SMILES: [Li+].CC(=O)[O-]

Properties
| Chemical formula | CH_{3}COOLi |
| Molar mass | 65.98 g·mol^{−1} |
| Appearance | White crystalline solid |
| Density | 1.26 g/cm^{3} |
| Melting point | 286 °C (547 °F; 559 K) |
| Solubility in water | 45.0 g/100 mL |
| Magnetic susceptibility (χ) | −34.0·10^{−6} cm^{3}/mol |

Hazards
- Occupational safety and health (OHS/OSH)
| Main hazards | toxic |
| NFPA 704 (fire diamond) | 2 0 0 |
- Lethal dose or concentration (LD, LC)
| LD_{50} (median dose) | 500 mg/kg (oral, mouse) |
| Safety data sheet (SDS) | External MSDS |

Related compounds
| Other anions | Lithium formate |
| Other cations | Sodium acetate; Potassium acetate; Rubidium acetate; Cesium acetate |
- Except where otherwise noted, data are given for materials in their standard state (at 25 °C [77 °F], 100 kPa). verify (what is ?) Infobox references

Lithium acetate is a lithium salt of acetic acid, with the chemical formula CH_{3}COOLi. It is often abbreviated as LiOAc. It is a white crystalline solid.

== Uses ==
Lithium acetate is used in the laboratory as buffer for gel electrophoresis of DNA and RNA. It has a lower electrical conductivity and can be run at higher speeds than can gels made from TAE buffer (5-30V/cm as compared to 5-10V/cm). At a given voltage, the heat generation and thus the gel temperature is much lower than with TAE buffers, therefore the voltage can be increased to speed up electrophoresis so that a gel run takes only a fraction of the usual time. Downstream applications, such as isolation of DNA from a gel slice or Southern blot analysis, work as expected when using lithium acetate gels.

Lithium boric acid or sodium boric acid are usually preferable to lithium acetate or TAE when analyzing smaller fragments of DNA (less than 500 bp) due to the higher resolution of borate-based buffers in this size range as compared to acetate buffers.

Lithium acetate is also used to permeabilize the cell wall of yeast for use in DNA transformation. It is believed that the beneficial effect of LiOAc is caused by its chaotropic effect; denaturing DNA, RNA and proteins.
