= Potassium acetate =

Colourless soluble salt of acetic acid

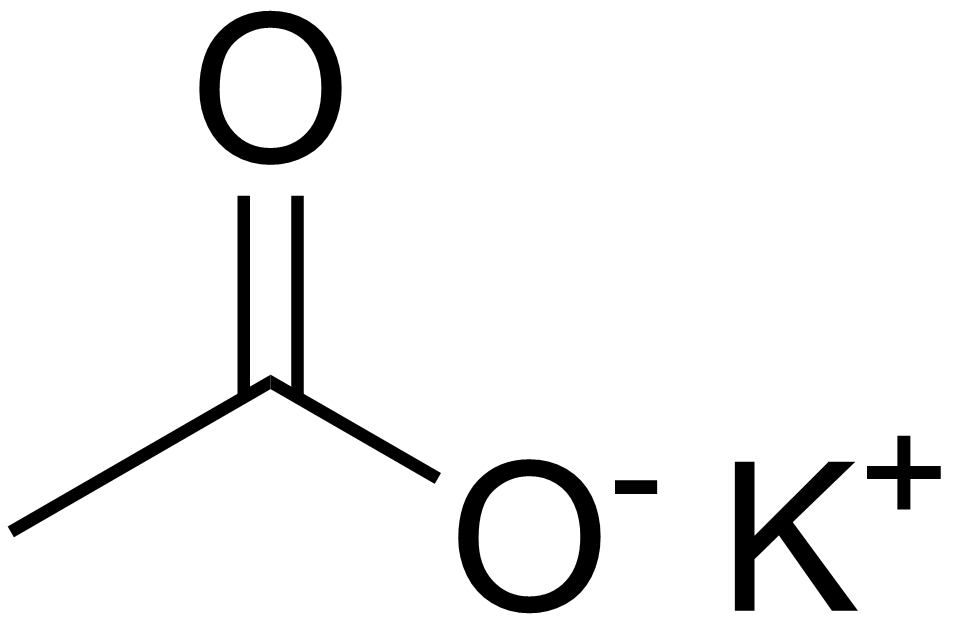
- Structural formula of potassium acetate

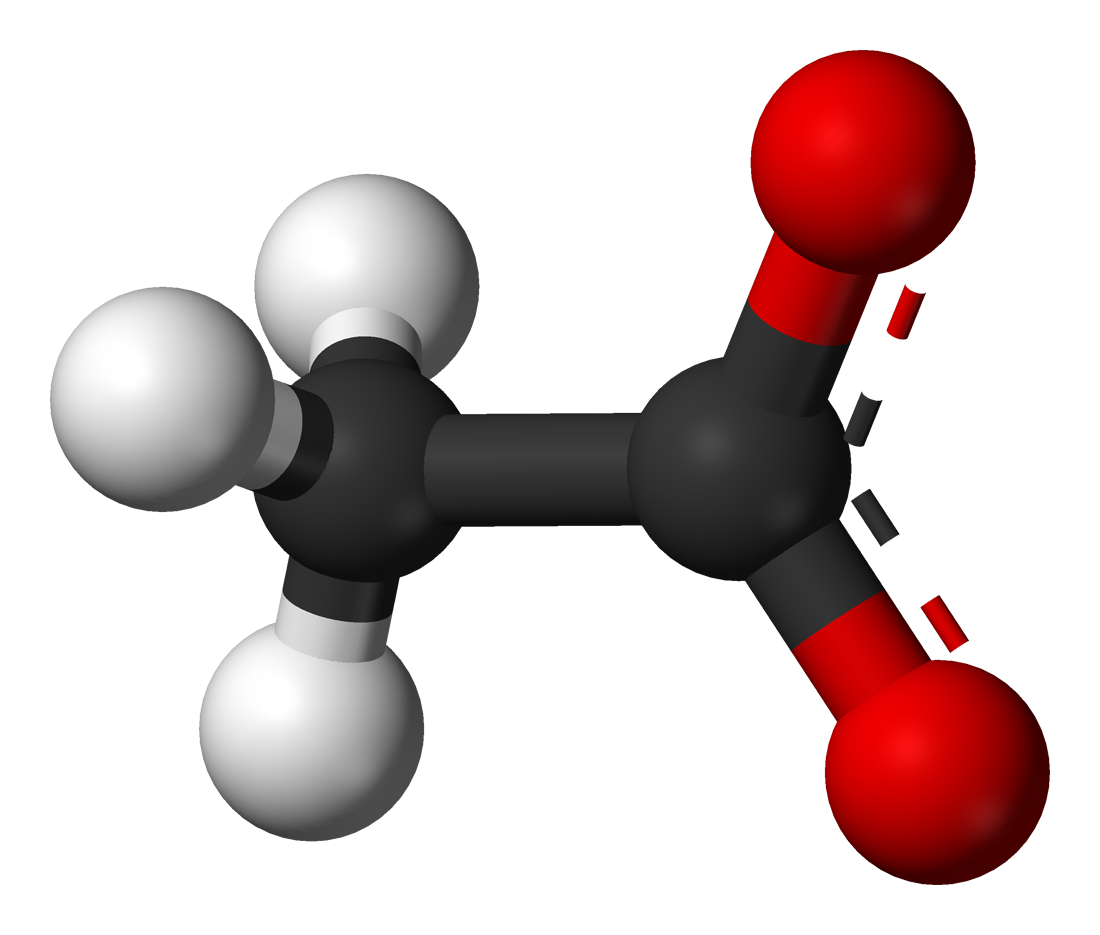

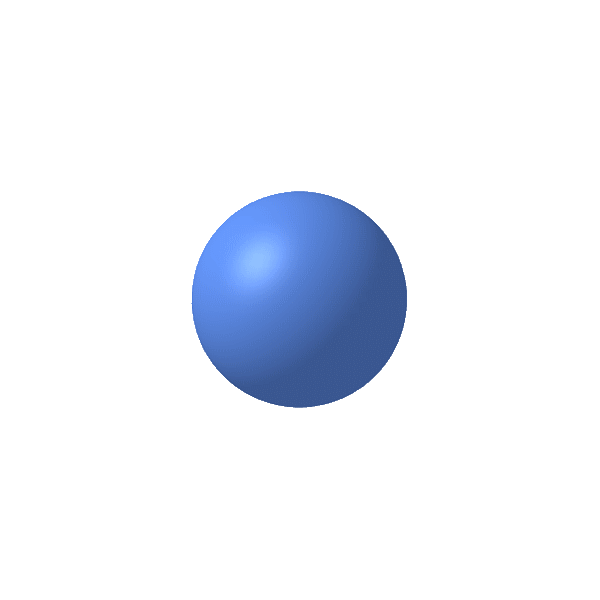

Names
- Preferred IUPAC name Potassium acetate
- Other names Potassium ethanoate

Identifiers
CAS Number	127-08-2
3D model (JSmol)	Interactive image
ChEMBL	ChEMBL1201058
ChemSpider	29104
ECHA InfoCard	100.004.385
E number	E261 (preservatives)
PubChem CID	31371
UNII	M911911U02
CompTox Dashboard (EPA)	DTXSID7027043
- InChI: InChI=1S/C2H4O2.K/c1-2(3)4;/h1H3,(H,3,4);/q;+1/p-1 Key: SCVFZCLFOSHCOH-UHFFFAOYSA-M; InChI=1/C2H4O2.K/c1-2(3)4;/h1H3,(H,3,4);/q;+1/p-1 Key: SCVFZCLFOSHCOH-REWHXWOFAA
- SMILES: CC(=O)[O-].[K+]

Properties
Chemical formula	CH_{3}COOK
Molar mass	98.142 g·mol^{−1}
Appearance	White deliquescent crystalline powder
Density	1.57 g/cm^{3} (25 °C (77 °F; 298 K))
Melting point	303–307 °C (577–585 °F; 576–580 K)
Boiling point	Decomposes
Solubility in water	216.7 g/100 mL (0.1 °C (32.2 °F; 273.2 K)); 233.7 g/100 mL (10 °C (50 °F; 283 K)); 268.6 g/100 mL (25 °C (77 °F; 298 K)); 320.8 g/100 mL (40 °C (104 °F; 313 K)); 390.7 g/100 mL (96 °C (205 °F; 369 K))
Solubility in methanol	24.24 g/100g (15 °C (59 °F; 288 K)); 53.54 g/100g (73.4 °C (164.1 °F; 346.5 K))
Solubility in ethanol	16.3 g/100g
Solubility in acetic acid	20.95 g/100g (28.03 °C (82.45 °F; 301.18 K))
Solubility in dimethylformamide	0.09 g/100g
Solubility in sulfur dioxide	0.006 g/100g (0 °C (32 °F; 273 K))
Solubility in liquid ammonia	1.026 g/100g (−33.9 °C (−29.0 °F; 239.2 K))
Vapor pressure	< 0.0000001 hPa
Acidity (pK_{a})	4.76

Structure
Crystal structure	Monoclinic

Thermochemistry
Heat capacity (C)	109.38 J/(mol × K)
Std molar entropy (S^{⦵}_{298})	150.82 J/(mol × K)
Std enthalpy of formation (Δ_{f}H^{⦵}_{298})	−722.6 kJ⋅mol^{−1}
Enthalpy of fusion (Δ_{f}H^{⦵}_{fus})	22 kJ⋅mol^{−1}

Pharmacology
ATC code	B05XA17 (WHO)

Hazards
- GHS labelling
Signal word	Warning
NFPA 704 (fire diamond)	1 1 1
- Lethal dose or concentration (LD, LC)
LD_{50} (median dose)	3250 mg/kg (oral, rat)

Related compounds
Other anions	Potassium formate; Potassium propionate
Other cations	Lithium acetate; Sodium acetate; Calcium acetate; Rubidium acetate
- Except where otherwise noted, data are given for materials in their standard state (at 25 °C [77 °F], 100 kPa). verify (what is ?) Infobox references

Potassium acetate (also called potassium ethanoate), (CH_{3}COOK) is the potassium salt of acetic acid. It is a hygroscopic solid at room temperature.

== Preparation ==
It can be prepared by treating a potassium-containing base such as potassium hydroxide with acetic acid:

CH_{3}COOH + KOH → CH_{3}COOK + H_{2}O

This sort of reaction is known as an acid-alkali reaction.

At saturation, the sesquihydrate in water solution (2CH_{3}COOK·3H_{2}O) begins to form the semihydrate (2CH_{3}COOK·H_{2}O) at 41.3 °C (106.3 °F).

== Applications ==
=== Deicing ===
Potassium acetate (as a substitute for calcium chloride or magnesium chloride) can be used as a deicer to remove ice or prevent its formation. It offers the advantages over chlorides of being less aggressive on soils and much less corrosive: for this reason, it is one of the preferred substances for removal of ice from airplanes and airport runways.

=== Fire extinguishing ===
Potassium acetate is the extinguishing agent used as a component in some Class K fire extinguishers because of its ability to cool and form a crust over burning oils.

=== Food additive ===
Potassium acetate is used in processed foods as a preservative and acidity regulator. In the European Union, it is labeled by the E number E261; it is also approved for usage in the USA, Australia, and New Zealand.

=== Medicine and biochemistry ===
In molecular biology, potassium acetate is used to precipitate Sodium dodecyl sulfate (SDS) and SDS-bound proteins to allow their removal from DNA.

Potassium acetate is used in mixtures applied for tissue preservation, fixation, and mummification. Most museums today use a formaldehyde-based method recommended by Kaiserling in 1897 which contains potassium acetate. This process was used to soak Lenin's corpse.

=== Industry ===
Potassium acetate is used as a catalyst in the production of polyurethanes.

=== Use in executions ===
Potassium acetate was incorrectly used in place of potassium chloride when putting a prisoner to death in Oklahoma in January 2015. Charles Frederick Warner was executed on January 15, 2015 with potassium acetate; this was not public knowledge until the scheduled execution of Richard Glossip was called off.

In August 2017, the U.S. state of Florida used potassium acetate (intentionally) in the execution of Mark James Asay.

== Historical ==
Potassium acetate is used as a diuretic and urinary alkalizer. Before modern chemistry, it was variously called terra foliata tartari, sal Sennerti, tartarus regeneratus, arcanum tartari and sal diureticus. In 1760 it was used in the preparation of Cadet's fuming liquid ((CH_{3})_{2}As)_{2} + ((CH_{3})_{2}As)_{2}O, the first organometallic compound ever produced.
