= Potassium formate =

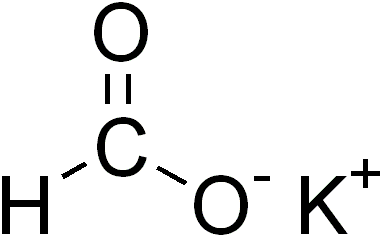

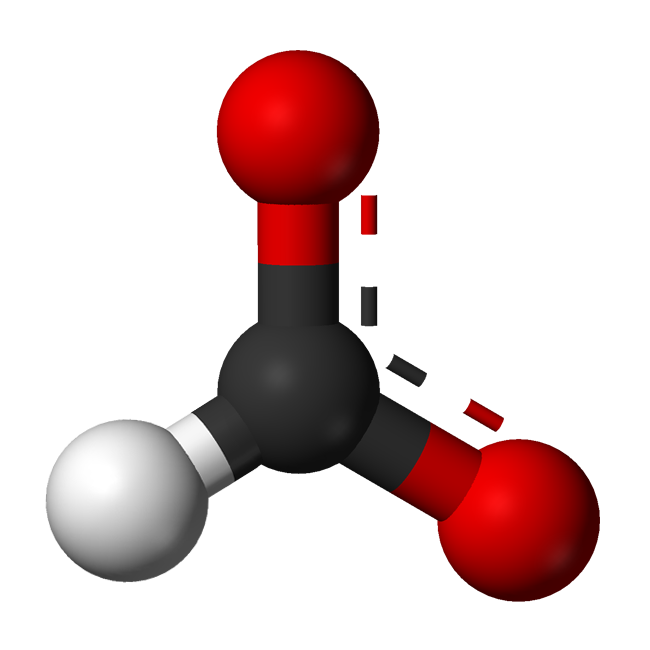

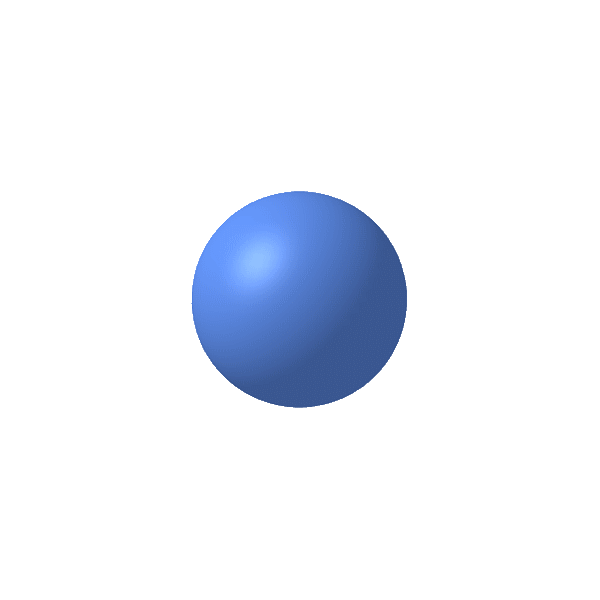

Names
- Preferred IUPAC name Potassium formate

Identifiers
CAS Number	590-29-4
3D model (JSmol)	Interactive image
ChemSpider	11054
ECHA InfoCard	100.008.799
PubChem CID	11539
UNII	25I90B156L
CompTox Dashboard (EPA)	DTXSID6029626
- InChI: InChI=1S/CH2O2.K/c2-1-3;/h1H,(H,2,3);/q;+1/p-1 Key: WFIZEGIEIOHZCP-UHFFFAOYSA-M; InChI=1/CH2O2.K/c2-1-3;/h1H,(H,2,3);/q;+1/p-1 Key: WFIZEGIEIOHZCP-REWHXWOFAK
- SMILES: C(=O)[O-].[K+]

Properties
Chemical formula	CHKO_{2}
Molar mass	84.115 g·mol^{−1}
Appearance	Colorless deliquescent crystals
Density	1.908 g/cm^{3}
Melting point	167.5 °C (333.5 °F; 440.6 K)
Boiling point	Decomposes
Solubility in water	32.8 g/100 mL (0 °C); 331 g/100 mL (25°C); 657 g/100 mL (80 °C)
Solubility	soluble in alcohol insoluble in ether
Basicity (pK_{b})	10.25

Hazards
- GHS labelling
Pictograms	(GHS07: Exclamation mark)
Signal word	Warning
Hazard statements	H315, H319, H335
Precautionary statements	P261, P280, P302+P352, P305+P351+P338
- Lethal dose or concentration (LD, LC)
LD_{50} (median dose)	5500 mg/kg (oral, mouse)
- Except where otherwise noted, data are given for materials in their standard state (at 25 °C [77 °F], 100 kPa). verify (what is ?) Infobox references

Potassium formate, HCO_{2}K, HCOOK, or KHCO_{2}, is the potassium salt of formic acid. This strongly hygroscopic white solid is an intermediate in the formate potash process for the production of potassium. Potassium formate has also been studied as a potential environmentally friendly deicing salt for use on roads. It has also been suggested for use in a less corrosive liquid desiccant. A 52% solution of potassium formate has a freezing point of −60 °C (−76 °F). Potassium formate brines are sometimes used for heat transfer, despite being much more corrosive than many other liquid coolants, especially to zinc and aluminum but even to many steels, though some formulations are compatible with aluminum and steels.

Since 1995, potassium formate has been increasingly used in aqueous drilling fluids to increase density, stabilize the hole, and improve drilling performance.
