= Protactinium compounds =

Protactinium compounds are compounds containing the element protactinium (symbol: Pa). These compounds usually have protactinium in the +5 oxidation state, although these compounds can also exist in the +2, +3 and +4 oxidation states.

== Properties of protactinium compounds ==
Formula	color	symmetry	space group	No	Pearson symbol	a (pm)	b (pm)	c (pm)	Z	density (g/cm^{3})
Pa	silvery-gray	tetragonal	I4/mmm	139	tI2	392.5	392.5	323.8	2	15.37
PaO		rocksalt	Fm3̅m	225	cF8	496.1			4	13.44
PaO_{2}	black	fcc	Fm3̅m	225	cF12	550.5			4	10.47
Pa_{2}O_{5}	white		Fm3̅m	225	cF16	547.6	547.6	547.6	4	10.96
Pa_{2}O_{5}	white	orthorhombic				692	402	418		
PaH_{3}	black	cubic	Pm3̅n	223	cP32	664.8	664.8	664.8	8	10.58
PaF_{4}	brown-red	monoclinic	C2/c	15	mS60				2	
PaCl_{4}	green-yellow	tetragonal	I4_{1}/amd	141	tI20	837.7	837.7	748.1	4	4.72
PaBr_{4}	brown	tetragonal	I4_{1}/amd	141	tI20	882.4	882.4	795.7		
PaCl_{5}	yellow	monoclinic	C2/c	15	mS24	797	1135	836	4	3.74
PaBr_{5}	red	monoclinic	P2_{1}/c	14	mP24	838.5	1120.5	1214.6	4	4.98
PaOBr_{3}		monoclinic	C2			1691.1	387.1	933.4		
Pa(PO_{3})_{4}		orthorhombic				696.9	895.9	1500.9		
Pa_{2}P_{2}O_{7}		cubic	Pa3			865	865	865		
Pa(C_{8}H_{8})_{2}	golden-yellow	monoclinic				709	875	1062		

Here a, b and c are lattice constants in picometers, No is space group number and Z is the number of formula units per unit cell; fcc stands for the face-centered cubic symmetry. Density was not measured directly but calculated from the lattice parameters.

== Oxides and oxygen-containing salts ==
Protactinium oxides are known for the metal oxidation states +2, +4 and +5. The most stable is white pentoxide Pa_{2}O_{5}, which can be produced by igniting protactinium(V) hydroxide in air at a temperature of 500 °C. Its crystal structure is cubic, and the chemical composition is often non-stoichiometric, described as PaO_{2.25}. Another phase of this oxide with orthorhombic symmetry has also been reported. The black dioxide PaO_{2} is obtained from the pentoxide by reducing it at 1550 °C with hydrogen. It is not readily soluble in either dilute or concentrated nitric, hydrochloric or sulfuric acids, but easily dissolves in hydrofluoric acid. The dioxide can be converted back to pentoxide by heating in oxygen-containing atmosphere to 1100 °C. The monoxide PaO has only been observed as a thin coating on protactinium metal, but not in an isolated bulk form.

Protactinium forms mixed binary oxides with various metals. With alkali metals A, the crystals have a chemical formula APaO_{3} and perovskite structure, or A_{3}PaO_{4} and distorted rock-salt structure, or A_{7}PaO_{6} where oxygen atoms form a hexagonal close-packed lattice. In all these materials, protactinium ions are octahedrally coordinated. The pentoxide Pa_{2}O_{5} combines with rare-earth metal oxides R_{2}O_{3} to form various nonstoichiometric mixed-oxides, also of perovskite structure.

Protactinium oxides are basic; they easily convert to hydroxides and can form various salts, such as sulfates, phosphates, nitrates, etc. Protactinyl nitrate is usually white but can be brown due to radiolytic decomposition. Heating the nitrate in air at 400 °C converts it to the white protactinium pentoxide. The polytrioxophosphate Pa(PO_{3})_{4} can be produced by reacting difluoride sulfate PaF_{2}SO_{4} with phosphoric acid (H_{3}PO_{4}) under inert gas atmosphere. Heating the product to about 900 °C eliminates the reaction by-products such as hydrofluoric acid, sulfur trioxide and phosphoric anhydride. Heating it to higher temperatures in an inert atmosphere decomposes Pa(PO_{3})_{4} into the diphosphate PaP_{2}O_{7}, which is analogous to diphosphates of other actinides. In the diphosphate, the PO_{3} groups form pyramids of C_{2v} symmetry. Heating PaP_{2}O_{7} in air to 1400 °C decomposes it into the pentoxides of phosphorus and protactinium.

== Halides ==
Protactinium(V) fluoride forms white crystals where protactinium ions are arranged in pentagonal bipyramids and coordinated by 7 other ions. The coordination is the same in protactinium(V) chloride, but the color is yellow. The coordination changes to octahedral in the brown protactinium(V) bromide and is unknown for protactinium(V) iodide. The protactinium coordination in all its tetrahalides is 8, but the arrangement is square antiprismatic in protactinium(IV) fluoride and dodecahedral in the chloride and bromide. Brown-colored protactinium(III) iodide has been reported where protactinium ions are 8-coordinated in a bicapped trigonal prismatic arrangement.

Coordination of protactinium (solid circles) and halogen atoms (open circles) in protactinium(V) fluoride or chloride.

Protactinium(V) fluoride and protactinium(V) chloride have a polymeric structure of monoclinic symmetry. There, within one polymeric chain, all the halide atoms lie in one graphite-like plane and form planar pentagons around the protactinium ions. The coordination 7 of protactinium originates from the 5 halide atoms and two bonds to protactinium atoms belonging to the nearby chains. These compounds easily hydrolyze in water. The pentachloride melts at 300 °C and sublimates at even lower temperatures.

Protactinium(V) fluoride can be prepared by reacting protactinium oxide with either bromine pentafluoride or bromine trifluoride at about 600 °C, and protactinium(IV) fluoride is obtained from the oxide and a mixture of hydrogen and hydrogen fluoride at 600 °C; a large excess of hydrogen is required to remove atmospheric oxygen leaks into the reaction.

Protactinium(V) chloride is prepared by reacting protactinium oxide with carbon tetrachloride at temperature of 200–300 °C. The by-products (such as PaOCl_{3}) are removed by fractional sublimation. Reduction of protactinium(V) chloride with hydrogen at about 800 °C yields protactinium(IV) chloride – a yellow-green solid which sublimes in vacuum at 400 °C; it can also be obtained directly from protactinium dioxide by treating it with carbon tetrachloride at 400 °C.

Protactinium bromides are produced by the action of aluminium bromide, hydrogen bromide, carbon tetrabromide or a mixture of hydrogen bromide and thionyl bromide on protactinium oxide. An alternative reaction is between protactinium pentachloride and hydrogen bromide or thionyl bromide. Protactinium(V) bromide has two similar monoclinic forms, one is obtained by sublimation at 400–410 °C and another by sublimation at slightly lower temperature of 390–400 °C.

Protactinium iodides result from the oxides and aluminium iodide or ammonium iodide heated to 600 °C. Protactinium(III) iodide was obtained by heating protactinium(V) iodide in vacuum. As with oxides, protactinium forms mixed halides with alkali metals. Among those, most remarkable is Na_{3}PaF_{8} where protactinium ion is symmetrically surrounded by 8 F^{−} ions which form a nearly perfect cube.

More complex protactinium fluorides are also known such as Pa_{2}F_{9} and ternary fluorides of the types MPaF_{6} (M = Li, Na, K, Rb, Cs or NH_{4}), M_{2}PaF_{7} (M = K, Rb, Cs or NH_{4}) and M_{3}PaF_{8} (M = Li, Na, Rb, Cs), all being white crystalline solids. The MPaF_{6} formula can be represented as a combination of MF and PaF_{5}. These compounds can be obtained by evaporating a hydrofluoric acid solution containing these both complexes. For the small alkali cations like Na, the crystal structure is tetragonal, whereas it lowers to orthorphombic for larger cations K^{+}, Rb^{+}, Cs^{+} or NH_{4}^{+}. A similar variation was observed for the M_{2}PaF_{7} fluorides, namely the crystal symmetry was dependent on the cation and differed for Cs_{2}PaF_{7} and M_{2}PaF_{7} (M = K, Rb or NH_{4}).

== Other inorganic compounds ==
Oxyhalides and oxysulfides of protactinium are known. PaOBr_{3} has a monoclinic structure composed of double-chain units where protactinium has coordination 7 and is arranged into pentagonal bipyramids. The chains are interconnected through oxygen and bromine atoms, and each oxygen atom is related to three protactinium atoms. PaOS is a light-yellow non-volatile solid with a cubic crystal lattice isostructural to that of other actinide oxysulfides. It is obtained by reacting protactinium(V) chloride with a mixture of hydrogen sulfide and carbon disulfide at 900 °C.

In hydrides and nitrides, protactinium has a low oxidation state of about +3. The hydride is obtained by direct action of hydrogen on the metal at 250 °C, and the nitride is a product of ammonia and protactinium tetrachloride or pentachloride. This bright yellow solid is stable to heating to 800 °C in vacuum. Protactinium carbide PaC is formed by reduction of protactinium tetrafluoride with barium in a carbon crucible at a temperature of about 1400 °C. Protactinium forms borohydrides which include Pa(BH_{4})_{4}. It has an unusual polymeric structure with helical chains where the protactinium atom has coordination number of 12 and is surrounded by six BH_{4}^{−} ions.

== Organometallic compounds ==
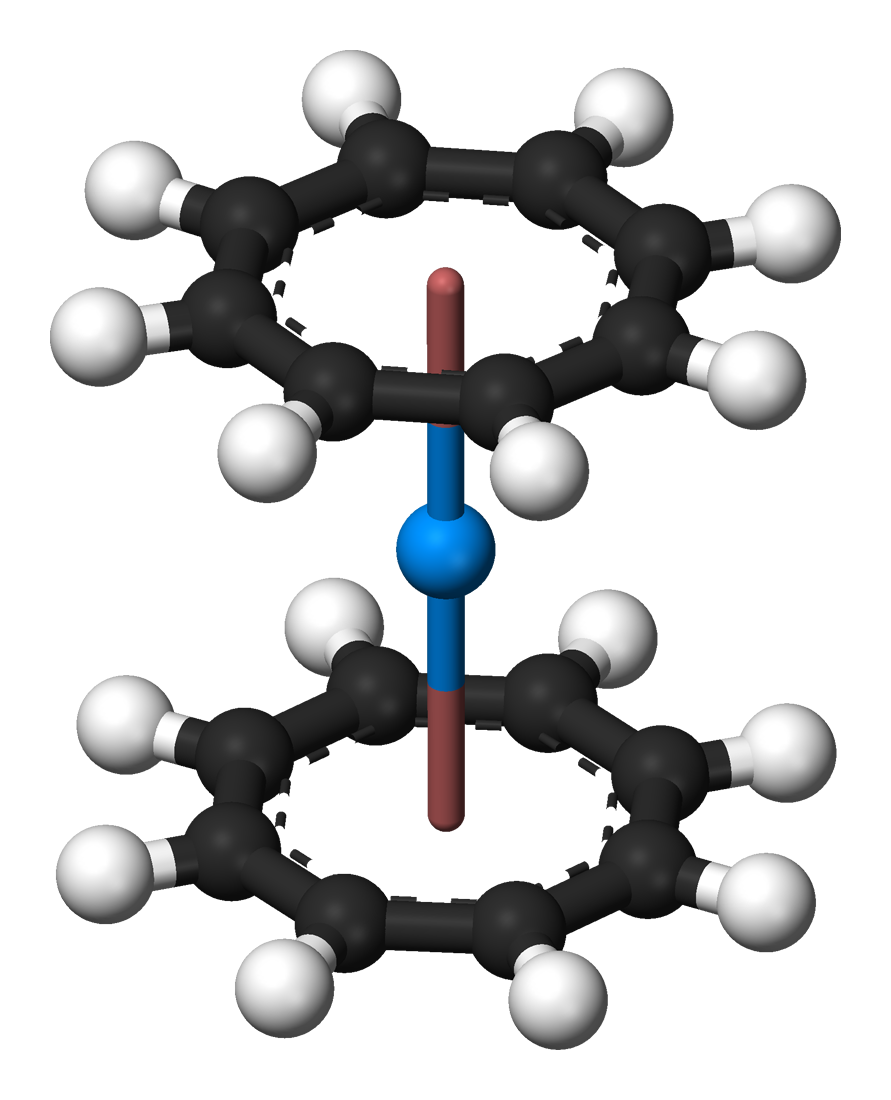
The proposed structure of the protactinocene (Pa(C_{8}H_{8})_{2}) molecule

Protactinium(IV) forms a tetrahedral complex tetrakis(cyclopentadienyl)protactinium(IV) (or Pa(C_{5}H_{5})_{4}) with four cyclopentadienyl rings, which can be synthesized by reacting protactinium(IV) chloride with molten Be(C_{5}H_{5})_{2}. One ring can be substituted with a halide atom. Another organometallic complex is golden-yellow bis(π-cyclooctatetraene) protactinium, or protactinocene, Pa(C_{8}H_{8})_{2}, which is analogous in structure to uranocene. There, the metal atom is sandwiched between two cyclooctatetraene ligands. Similar to uranocene, it can be prepared by reacting protactinium tetrachloride with dipotassium cyclooctatetraenide, K_{2}C_{8}H_{8}, in tetrahydrofuran.

== See also ==
- Category:Protactinium compounds
- Praseodymium compounds
