= Protactinium oxide =

Protactinium oxide may refer to:

- Protactinium(II) oxide, PaO
- Protactinium(IV) oxide, PaO_{2}
- Protactinium(V) oxide, Pa_{2}O_{5}

== See also ==
- Protactinium#Chemical compounds
