= Protactinium(V) fluoride =

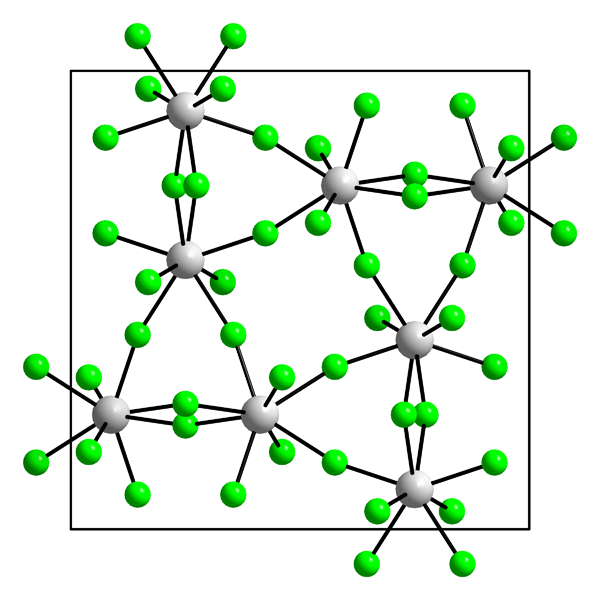

Identifiers
CAS Number	15192-29-7
3D model (JSmol)	Interactive image
PubChem CID	101946429 (charge error)
- InChI: InChI=1S/5FH.Pa/h5*1H;/q;;;;;+5/p-5 Key: LULSFBDYSXVRIJ-UHFFFAOYSA-I
- SMILES: F[Pa](F)(F)(F)F

Properties
Chemical formula	PaF_{5}
Molar mass	326.02790 g·mol^{−1}
Appearance	white solid
Solubility in water	Soluble in water and hydrofluoric acid

Related compounds
Other anions	Protactinium(V) chloride; Protactinium(V) bromide; Protactinium(V) iodide; Vanadium pentafluoride; Niobium(V) fluoride; Tantalum(V) fluoride
Other cations	Uranium(V) fluoride
Related compounds	Protactinium(IV) fluoride
- Except where otherwise noted, data are given for materials in their standard state (at 25 °C [77 °F], 100 kPa). Infobox references

Protactinium(V) fluoride is a fluoride of protactinium with the chemical formula PaF_{5}.

== Preparation ==
Protactinium(V) fluoride can be obtained by reacting protactinium(V) oxide with bromine trifluoride or bromine pentafluoride at 600 °C:

6 Pa_{2}O_{5} + 20 BrF_{3} → 12 PaF_{5} + 10 Br_{2} + 15 O_{2}
6 Pa_{2}O_{5} + 12 BrF_{5} → 12 PaF_{5} + 6 Br_{2} + 15 O_{2}

It can also be obtained by reacting protactinium(V) chloride or protactinium(IV) fluoride with fluorine gas at 700 °C:

2 PaF_{4} + F_{2} → 2 PaF_{5}

The hydrate form of protactinium(V) fluoride can be formed by the reaction of protactinium(V) oxide and hydrofluoric acid in an aqueous solution:

Pa_{2}O_{5} + 10 HF → 2 PaF_{5}·2H_{2}O + 6 H_{2}O

It can also be decomposed from fluorine-containing protactinium complexes.

== Properties ==
Protactinium(V) fluoride is a white, volatile, extremely hygroscopic solid that is partially soluble in water and soluble in hydrofluoric acid. It has a tetragonal crystal structure of the β-uranium pentafluoride type with the space group I42d (space group no. 122) with the lattice parameters a = 1153 pm, c = 510 pm. Quartz and Pyrex are attacked by the compound at higher temperatures. As a dihydrate, it is a colourless, hygroscopic, crystalline solid that is waxy in nature. It is soluble in water and hydrofluoric acid. It reacts with phosphorus trifluoride to form protactinium(IV) fluoride. The dihydrate cannot be converted into the anhydrous form in air, hydrogen fluoride or fluorine at low temperatures. Instead, diprotactinium(V) oxide octafluoride (Pa_{2}OF_{8}) is formed. At higher temperatures around 325 °C, a mixture of the diprotactinium(V) oxide octafluoride and protactinium(V) fluoride is formed.
