= Fajans =

Fajans is a surname. Notable people with the name include:

- Kazimierz Fajans (1887–1975), Polish American physical chemist
- Maksymilian Fajans (1827–1890), Polish-Jewish artist, lithographer and photographer

== See also ==
- Fajans–Paneth–Hahn Law
- Fajans' rules
- Radioactive displacement law of Fajans and Soddy
