= Protactinium(IV) chloride =

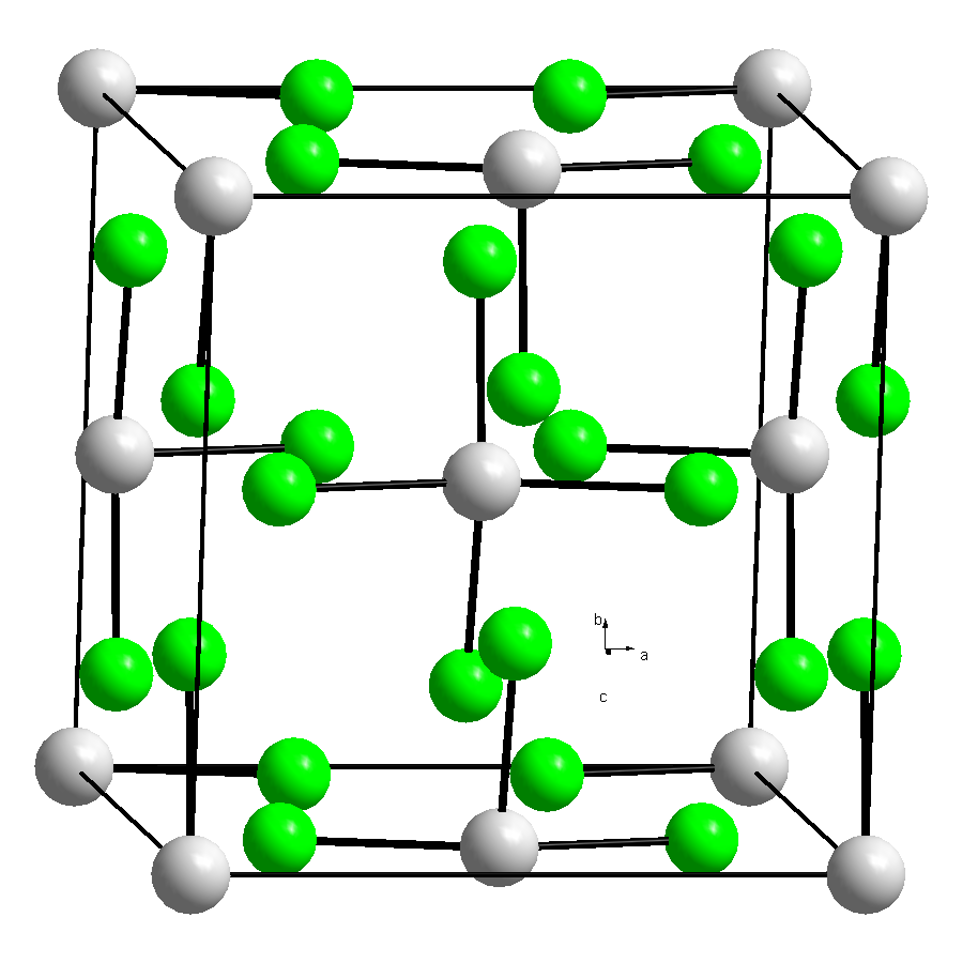

Names
- IUPAC name Protactinium(IV) chloride

Identifiers
CAS Number	13867-41-9
3D model (JSmol)	Interactive image
PubChem CID	57467750
- InChI: InChI=1S/4ClH.Pa/h4*1H;/q;;;;+4/p-4 Key: YVRMMEYNJWFJEX-UHFFFAOYSA-J
- SMILES: [Pa](Cl)(Cl)(Cl)Cl

Properties
Chemical formula	PaCl_{4}
Molar mass	372.848 g mol^{−1}
Appearance	chartreuse
Density	4.72 g/cm^{3}

Structure
Crystal structure	tetragonal，tI20
Space group	I4_{1}/amd , No. 141

Related compounds
Other anions	Protactinium(IV) fluoride Protactinium(IV) bromide Protactinium(IV) iodide
Other cations	Uranium(IV) chloride Thorium(IV) chloride Praseodymium(III) chloride
Related compounds	Protactinium(V) chloride
- Except where otherwise noted, data are given for materials in their standard state (at 25 °C [77 °F], 100 kPa). Infobox references

Protactinium(IV) chloride is an inorganic compound. It is an actinide halide, a salt composed of protactinium and chlorine. It is radioactive, and has the chemical formula of PaCl_{4}. It is a chartreuse-coloured (yellowish-green) crystal of the tetragonal crystal system.

== Preparation ==
Protactinium(IV) chloride can be prepared by the reduction of protactinium(V) chloride:

2 PaCl_{5} + H_{2} → 2 PaCl_{4} + 2 HCl
3 PaCl_{5} + Al → 3 PaCl_{4} + AlCl_{3}

It can also be obtained by the chlorination of protactinium(IV) oxide:

PaO_{2} + 2 CCl_{4} → PaCl_{4} + 2 COCl_{2}

It can also be formed during the thermal decomposition of protactinium oxychloride at 500 °C in a vacuum:

2 PaOCl_{2} → PaCl_{4} + PaO_{2}

== Properties ==
Protactinium(IV) chloride is a chartreuse, hygroscopic, crystalline solid that can be sublimed at 400 °C in a vacuum. It is soluble in strong mineral acids, forming green solutions. The complex PaCl_{4}·4CH_{3}CN is formed with acetonitrile. It has a tetragonal crystal structure with the space group I4_{1}/amd (space group no. 141) and the lattice parameters a = 837.7 pm, c = 747.9 pm of the uranium(IV) chloride type.
