= Protactinium(IV) bromide =

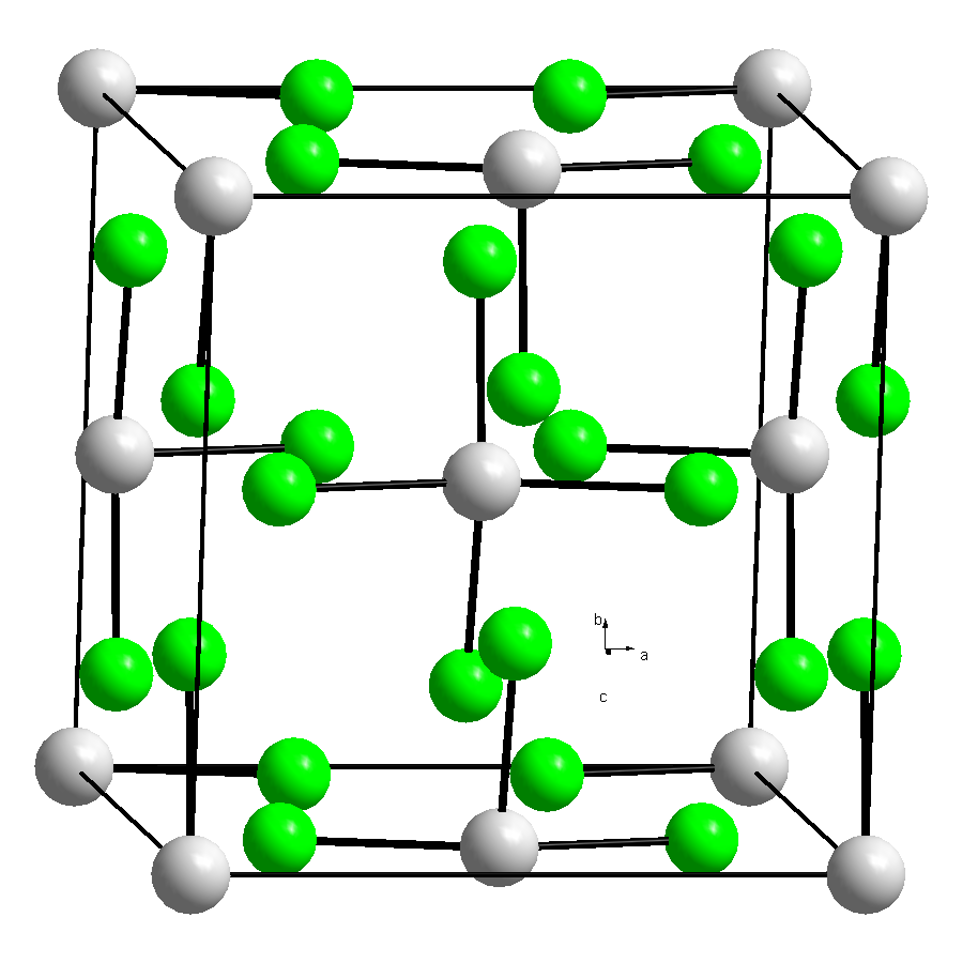

Names
- IUPAC name Protactinium(IV) tetrabromide

Identifiers
| CAS Number | 13867-42-0 |
| 3D model (JSmol) | Interactive image |
- InChI: InChI=1S/4BrH.Pa/h4*1H;/q;;;;+4/p-4 Key: HWPJRUOTLXLOJI-UHFFFAOYSA-J
- SMILES: [Pa](Br)(Br)(Br)Br

Properties
| Chemical formula | PaBr_{4} |
| Molar mass | 550.652 |
| Appearance | red crystals |

Structure
| Crystal structure | tetragonal crystal system，tI20 |
| Space group | I4_{1}/amd , No. 141 |

Related compounds
| Other anions | Protactinium(IV) fluoride Protactinium(IV) chloride Protactinium(IV) iodide |
| Other cations | Uranium(IV) bromide Thorium(IV) bromide Praseodymium(III) bromide |
| Related compounds | Protactinium(V) bromide |
- Except where otherwise noted, data are given for materials in their standard state (at 25 °C [77 °F], 100 kPa). Infobox references

Protactinium(IV) bromide is an inorganic compound. It is an actinide halide, composed of protactinium and bromine. It is radioactive, and has the chemical formula of PaBr_{4}. It may be due to the brown color of bromine that causes the appearance of protactinium(IV) bromide to be brown crystals. Its crystal structure is tetragonal. Protactinium(IV) bromide is sublimed in a vacuum at 400 °C. The protactinium(IV) halide closest in structure to protactinium(IV) bromide is protactinium(IV) chloride.

== Preparation ==
Protactinium(IV) bromide can be prepared by reacting protactinium(V) bromide with hydrogen gas or aluminium:

$$\mathsf{ 3 PaBr_5 + Al \ \xrightarrow{400-450^oC}\ 3 PaBr_4 + AlBr_3 }$$
$$\mathsf{ 2 PaBr_5 + H_2 \ \xrightarrow{800^oC}\ 2 PaBr_4 + 2 HBr }$$

== Properties ==
Protactinium(IV) bromide reacts with antimony trioxide to form protactinium bromate:

$$\mathsf{ 3 PaBr_4 + Sb_2O_3 \ \xrightarrow{150-200^oC}\ 3 PaOBr_2 + 2 SbBr_3  }$$

== See also ==
- Protactinium(V) bromide
