= Monoxytriselenatoprotactinic acid =

Names
- Other names: Protactinium(V) selenate; Protactinium oxyselenate

Identifiers

Properties
Chemical formula	H_{3}PaO(SeO_{4})_{3}
Molar mass	678.93 g/mol
Appearance	White hygroscopic crystals
Density	4.83 g/cm^{3}

Structure
Crystal structure	Hexagonal
- Except where otherwise noted, data are given for materials in their standard state (at 25 °C [77 °F], 100 kPa). Infobox references

Monoxytriselenatoprotactinic acid is an inorganic compound of protactinium and selenate with the chemical formula H_{3}PaO(SeO_{4})_{3}. It contains protactinium in the +5 oxidation state and is an oxoselenato complex rather than a simple protactinium selenate salt. The compound forms white, hygroscopic, radioactive crystals.

== Preparation ==
Monoxytriselenatoprotactinic acid can be prepared from protactinium(V) oxide using a mixture of hydrofluoric acid and selenic acid. Protactinium(V) oxide is dissolved in the acidic mixture, which is then heated and evaporated until hydrogen fluoride has been removed.

Pa_{2}O_{5} + 6 H_{2}SeO_{4} → 2 H_{3}PaO(SeO_{4})_{3} + 3 H_{2}O

The compound can be crystallized directly from mixtures of H_{2}SeO_{4} and HF containing Pa(V).

== Structure and properties ==
Monoxytriselenatoprotactinic acid crystallizes with hexagonal symmetry. It is isostructural with the analogous sulfate, H_{3}PaO(SO_{4})_{3}.

Reported lattice parameters are approximately a = 9.743 Å and c = 5.679 Å, with two formula units per unit cell.

Complete structural details have not been determined, but infrared spectroscopic studies indicate that at least some of the selenate groups coordinate to protactinium in a bidentate manner.

The compound is strongly hygroscopic. It dissolves in dilute sulfuric acid, but is insoluble in benzene, nitrobenzene, diethyl ether, nitromethane and acetonitrile.

== Thermal decomposition ==
On strong heating, monoxytriselenatoprotactinic acid decomposes to protactinium(V) oxide.

The overall decomposition has been represented as:

2 H_{3}PaO(SeO_{4})_{3} → Pa_{2}O_{5} + 3 H_{2}SeO_{4} + 3 SeO_{3}

Substantial decomposition occurs by about 750 °C.
