= Uranium iodide =

Uranium iodide may refer to one of three chemical compounds:

- Uranium triiodide, UI_{3}
- Uranium(IV) iodide (or uranium tetraiodide), UI_{4}
- Uranium pentaiodide, UI_{5}
