= Protactinium bromide =

Protactinium bromide may refer to:

- Protactinium(IV) bromide (protactinium tetrabromide), PaBr_{4}
- Protactinium(V) bromide (protactinium pentabromide), PaBr_{5}
