= Protactinyl nitrate =

Names
- Other names: Protactinium(V) oxynitrate

Identifiers
CAS Number	13973-99-4
3D model (JSmol)	Interactive image
- InChI: InChI=1S/3NO3.O.Pa/c3*2-1(3)4;;/q3*-1;;+3 Key: HPGAUFDFQPEWQU-UHFFFAOYSA-N
- SMILES: [Pa](O[N+]([O-])=O)(O[N+]([O-])=O)(O[N+]([O-])=O)=O

Properties
Chemical formula	PaO(NO_{3})_{3}
Molar mass	433.05 g/mol
Appearance	White solid
Melting point	400 °C (752 °F; 673 K) (decomposition)
Solubility in water	Hydrolysis
Solubility	Soluble in fuming nitric acid

Related compounds
Other cations	Uranyl nitrate
- Except where otherwise noted, data are given for materials in their standard state (at 25 °C [77 °F], 100 kPa). Infobox references

Protactinyl nitrate, protactinium(V) oxynitrate, or erroneously known as protactinium nitrate, is a radioactive chemical compound with the formula PaO(NO_{3})_{3}·xH_{2}O (1.5 ≤ x ≤ 4). It is a white solid that readily hydrolyzes to protactinium(V) oxide in moist air. This compound is a common commercial source of protactinium.

== Preparation and decomposition ==
Protactinyl nitrate was first prepared in 1966 by reacting protactinium(V) chloride or protactinium(V) bromide with fuming nitric acid. Lower concentrations of nitric acid cannot be used, due to the hydrolysis of the compound.

Protactinyl nitrate decomposes at 400 °C to protactinium(V) oxide.
