= Protactinium(V) iodide =

Names
- Other names Protactinium pentaiodide

Identifiers
CAS Number	17497-66-4
3D model (JSmol)	Interactive image
- InChI: InChI=1S/5HI.Pa/h5*1H;/q;;;;;+5/p-5 Key: YPAMTXBEKRLMQF-UHFFFAOYSA-I
- SMILES: I[Pa](I)(I)(I)I

Properties
Chemical formula	I_{5}Pa
Molar mass	865.55823 g·mol^{−1}
Appearance	black needle crystals

Related compounds
Other anions	Protactinium(V) fluoride Protactinium(V) chloride Protactinium(V) bromide
Other cations	Praseodymium(III) iodide Thorium(IV) iodide Uranium(IV) iodide
- Except where otherwise noted, data are given for materials in their standard state (at 25 °C [77 °F], 100 kPa). Infobox references

Protactinium(V) iodide is an inorganic compound, with the chemical formula of PaI_{5}.

== Preparation ==
It can be prepared by the reaction of metals protactinium and iodine, or by reacting protactinium(V) chloride, protactinium(V) bromide or protactinium(V) oxide with silicon tetraiodide.

== Properties ==
It reacts with antimony trioxide in a vacuum at 150 °C to give the iodide oxides PaOI_{3} and PaO_{2}I; it reacts with protactinium(V) bromide at 350 °C to obtain mixed halides PaBr_{3}I_{2}. It reacts with the monocarbide at 600 °C to give protactinium tetraiodide.

Aristid von Grosse was able to produce pure metallic protactinium with the decomposition of protactinium(V) iodide.

When heated at 300 °C for a long time, it decomposes and iodine is released:

PaI_{5} → PaI_{3} + I_{2}
