= Protactinium trihydride =

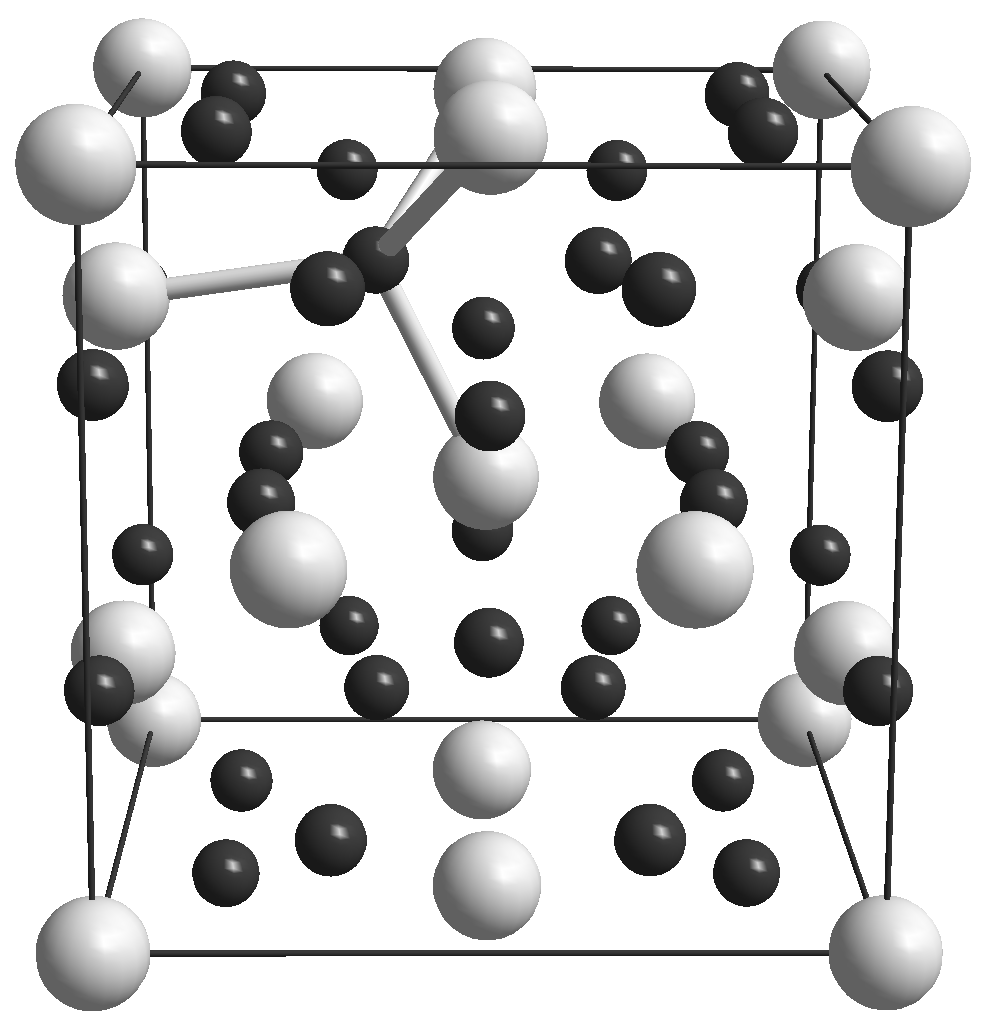

Identifiers
CAS Number	39096-86-1
3D model (JSmol)	Interactive image
- InChI: InChI=1S/Pa.3H/q+3;3*-1 Key: RREPDROBWYBJQU-UHFFFAOYSA-N
- SMILES: [H-].[H-].[H-].[Pa+3]

Properties
Chemical formula	H_{3}Pa
Molar mass	234.060 g·mol^{−1}
Appearance	black solid
- Except where otherwise noted, data are given for materials in their standard state (at 25 °C [77 °F], 100 kPa). Infobox references

Protactinium trihydride is an inorganic compound with the chemical formula PaH_{3}. It is isostructural with uranium trihydride and can be prepared by reacting protactinium and hydrogen at 250°C and 600 mmHg. Theoretical calculations show that it can form further compounds PaH_{n} (n = 4, 5, 8, 9) under high pressure. Protactinium trihydride is sensitive to moist air and oxygen.
