= Kazimierz Fajans =

Polish-American physical chemist (1887–1975)

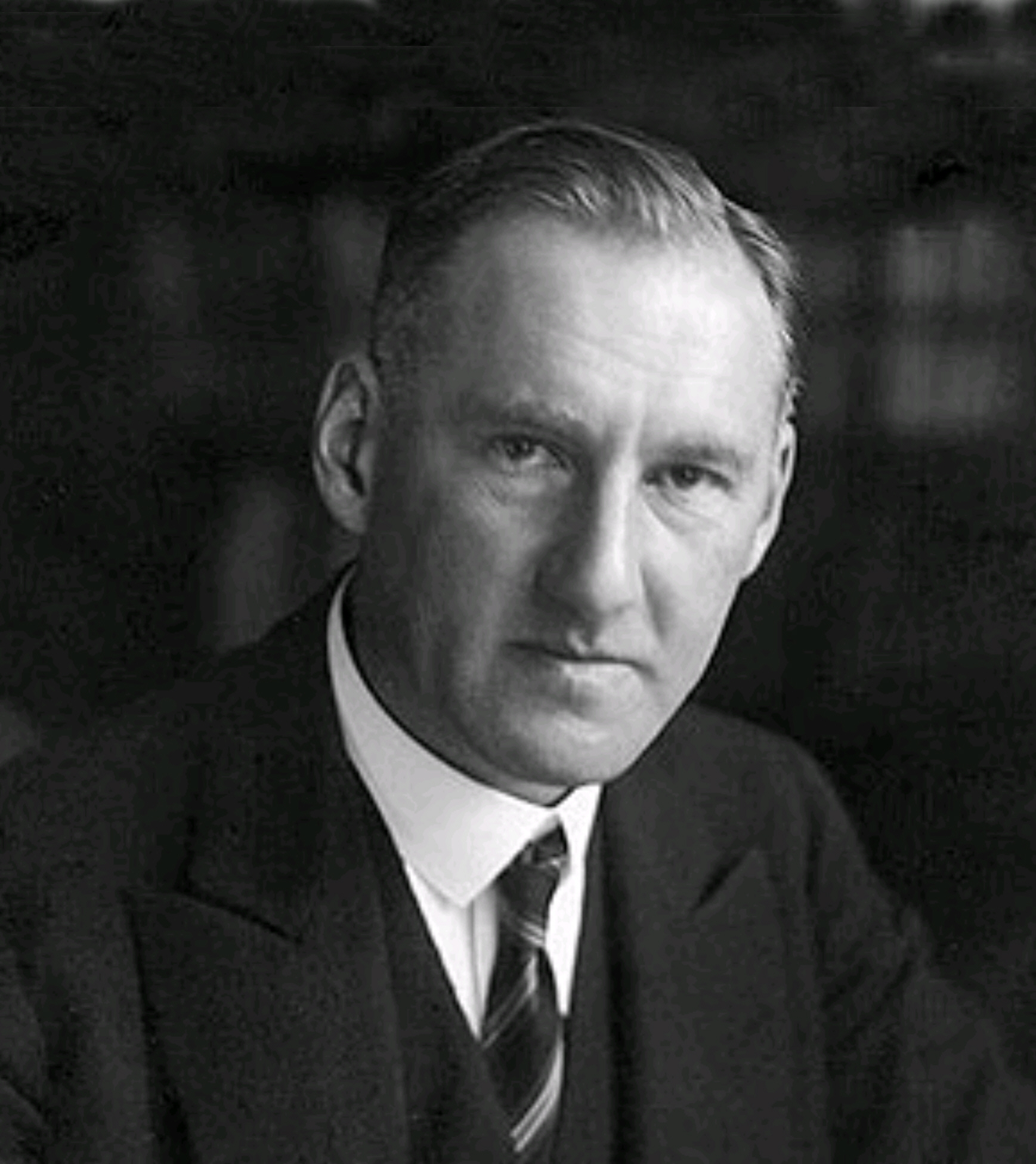
- Kazimierz Fajans
- Born: 27 May 1887; Warsaw, Poland
- Died: 18 May 1975 (aged 87); Ann Arbor, Michigan, United States
- Known for: Discovery of protactinium; Fajans method Fajans' rules; Fajan's and Soddy's law; Fajans–Paneth–Hahn Law
- Scientific career
- Workplaces: University of Karlsruhe (TH); Ludwig-Maximilians-Universität München; Institute of Physical Chemistry; University of Michigan
- Doctoral students: Theodore H. Berlin

Kazimierz Fajans (Kasimir Fajans in many American publications; 27 May 1887 – 18 May 1975) was a Polish physical chemist, a pioneer in the science of radioactivity and the co-discoverer of chemical element protactinium. He was nominated for the Nobel Prize four times – three times in Chemistry and once in Physics – but he was never honored.

== Education and career ==
Fajans was born on 27 May 1887, in Warsaw, Congress Poland, to a family of Jewish background. After he had completed secondary school in Warsaw (1904), he studied chemistry in Germany, first at Leipzig University, and then at Heidelberg University and the University of Zurich. In 1909, he was awarded his PhD for research into the stereoselective synthesis of chiral compounds.

In 1910, Fajans took a job at the laboratory of Ernest Rutherford in Manchester, where the nucleus was discovered. He then returned to Germany, where he became an assistant and subsequently assistant professor at the University of Karlsruhe (TH), researching radioactivity. In 1917, he headed the Faculty of Physical Chemistry at the Ludwig-Maximilians-Universität München, and in 1932 became the Head of the Institute of Physical Chemistry established by the Rockefeller Foundation. In 1935, he left Germany due to escalating Nazi persecution. He stayed for a while at the University of Cambridge and then moved to the University of Michigan where he worked until his demise. In 1959, he became an honorary member of the Polish Chemical Society.

Fajans retired at the age of seventy but never stopped working. He died May 18, 1975, in Ann Arbor, Michigan.

== Scientific work ==
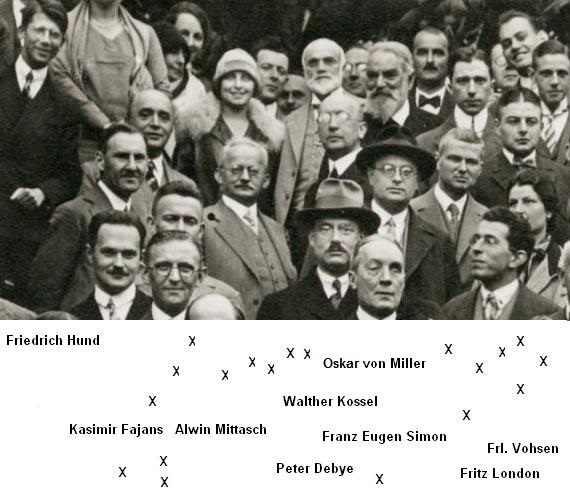
Fajans at the Bunsen Congress, Munich, 1928. Pictured with Peter Debye, Fritz London, Friedrich Hund, Alwin Mittasch, and Oskar von Miller

Fajans worked with Henry G. Moseley at the laboratory of Ernest Rutherford researching properties of the radioactive rows of the periodic table. He identified the half-lives of the uranium-actinium row and thorium nuclides. He discovered the phenomenon of the electrochemical branching of the radioactive rows. Afterwards, Fajans worked on the electrochemical properties of elements as a result of the radioactive changes, and he formulated the law of the radioactive shifts which was later named the radioactive displacement law of Fajans and Soddy (Frederick Soddy received the Nobel Prize in chemistry in 1921 for his isotopic research). In 1913, together with Oswald Helmuth Göhring, he discovered the first radionuclide of a new element, which was later named protactinium. Fajans and Otto Hahn discovered the formula that defined the conditions of precipitation and absorption of radioactive substances. It is very significant for separation and purification of radioactive substances found in the smallest number.

In 1919, Fajans began researching the structure of crystals by thermochemical and refractometric methods. The co-relation of Born, Fajans and Haber is a basic thermochemical rule. On the basis of his research data Fajans formulated the essential relationships concerning chemical bond strength and deformation of ions and particles, such as heat of ion hydration, refractive index and the heat of sublimation. In 1923, he formulated Fajans' rules of inorganic chemistry, which are used to predict whether a chemical bond will be covalent or ionic.

In the United States he researched nuclear reactions using a cyclotron and discovered a radioactive lead isotope with Voigt, and a new rhenium isotope with Sullivan. He was a member of the Polish Institute of Arts and Sciences in America and of many societies and academies.

== Bibliography ==
- 1913 - Radioactive Transformations and the Periodic System of the Elements
- 1941 - Artificial radioactive isotopes of Thallium, Lead and Bismuth
- 1947 - Application of the resonance theory to the structure of the water molecule
- 1948 - Electronic structure of molecules

== See also ==
- Radioactivity
- Timeline of Polish science and technology
- List of nominees for the Nobel Prize in Physics
- List of nominees for the Nobel Prize in Chemistry
