= Oswald Helmuth Göhring =

German chemist (1889–1915)

- Born: 1889
- Died: c. 1915
- Education: University of Karlsruhe
- Known for: Discovery of protactinium
- Scientific career
- Doctoral advisor: Kazimierz Fajans

Oswald Helmuth Göhring, also known as Otto Göhring, (1889 – c. 1915) was a German chemist who, with his teacher Kasimir Fajans, co-discovered the chemical element protactinium in 1913.

== Discovery of protactinium ==
Protactinium was first identified in 1913 by Kasimir Fajans and Oswald Helmuth Göhring at the University of Karlsruhe. The new element was named brevium due to the brief half-life of the isotope specific studied, Protactinium-234 (234 Pa).

Fajans and Göhring also worked to identify as many isotopes of the new element as possible, and also to publicize their discovery—a process that was hampered by the beginning of World War I.

In 1914, Göhring was conscripted into the army. Presumably he perished during the war; he is listed as the author of no further scientific articles or publications after 1915.

A stable isotope of this element was discovered in 1918, and thus the name was changed to protoactinium, which was abbreviated in 1949 to its present name, protactinium.

== Publications ==
- Oswald Helmuth Göhring: Über das neue Element Brevium und Versuche zur Auffindung seiner Isotopen. (About the new element brevium and attempts to locate its isotopes). PhD Thesis, Karlsruhe Technische Hochschule zu Fridericiana, 1914. 58 p.
- K. Fajans and OH Göhring, "Über das Uran X2-das neue Element der Uranreihe." ("Uranium X2, the new element in the uranium series") Phys. Zeitschrift, 1913, 14, 877-884.
