= Aristid von Grosse =

Nuclear chemist (1905–1985)

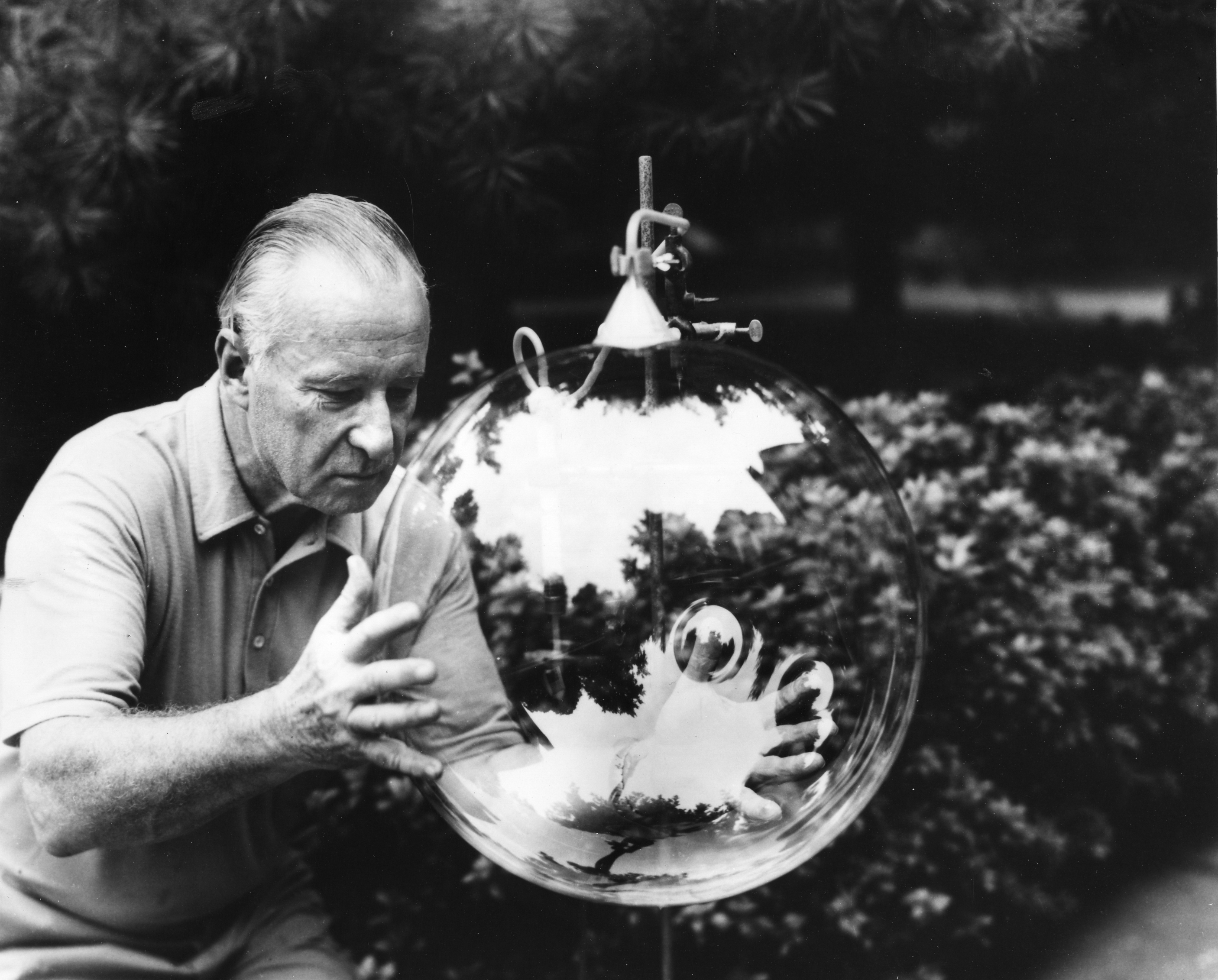
- Born: January 1905; Riga, Russian Empire
- Died: July 21, 1985 (aged 80); Laguna Hills, California, United States
- Known for: isolation of pure protactinium and some of its compounds
- Scientific career
- Fields: Actinide chemistry
- Workplaces: Kaiser Wilhelm Institute for Chemistry, University of Chicago
- Doctoral advisor: Karl Andreas Hofmann, Otto Hahn

Aristid von Grosse (January 1905 – July 21, 1985) was a German nuclear chemist. During his work with Otto Hahn, he got access to waste material from radium production, and with this starting material he was able in 1927 to isolate protactinium(V) oxide and was later able to produce metallic protactinium by decomposition of protactinium(V) iodide.

From 1948 to 1969, he was president of the Research Institute of Temple University and was later affiliated with the laboratories of the Franklin Institute in Philadelphia until his retirement in 1979. In 1971, he received a United States Atomic Energy Commission award in recognition of his "outstanding contributions to the development of nuclear energy."

Aristid was born in Riga in January 1905 and moved to the United States in 1930. He retired in 1979 and died of pneumonia in Laguna Hills, California on July 21, 1985.

Grosse studied also bubbles stabilized with organic polymers.
