= Protactinium tetraiodide =

Identifiers
CAS Number	15513-96-9
3D model (JSmol)	Interactive image
- InChI: InChI=1S/4HI.Pa/h4*1H;/q;;;;+4/p-4 Key: KIEAWOXJKSIKSB-UHFFFAOYSA-J
- SMILES: [Pa+4].[I-].[I-].[I-].[I-]

Properties
Chemical formula	I_{4}Pa
Molar mass	738.65376 g·mol^{−1}
Appearance	black crystals

Related compounds
Related compounds	uranium tetraiodide, thorium tetraiodide
- Except where otherwise noted, data are given for materials in their standard state (at 25 °C [77 °F], 100 kPa). Infobox references

Protactinium tetraiodide is a binary inorganic compound of protactinium metal and iodine with the chemical formula PaI_{4}.

== Synthesis ==
Protactinium tetraiodide can be prepared by reducing the pentaiodide with aluminum at about 400 °C:

3PaI_{5} + Al → 3PaI_{4} + AlI_{3}

Also, a reaction of hydrogen reduction of protactinium(V) iodide at 400 °C:

2PaI_{5} + H_{2} → 2PaI_{4} + 2HI

== Physical properties ==
The compound forms black or dark green crystals. The structure is not known.

== Chemical properties ==
The compound is oxidized by antimony trioxide when heated in a vacuum:

3PaI_{4} + Sb_{2}O_{3} → 3PaOI_{2} + 2SbI_{3}

The compound also reacts with quartz when heated:

2PaI_{4} + SiO_{2} → 2PaOI_{2} + SiI_{4}
