= Institute of Physical Chemistry of the Polish Academy of Sciences =

Polish research institute

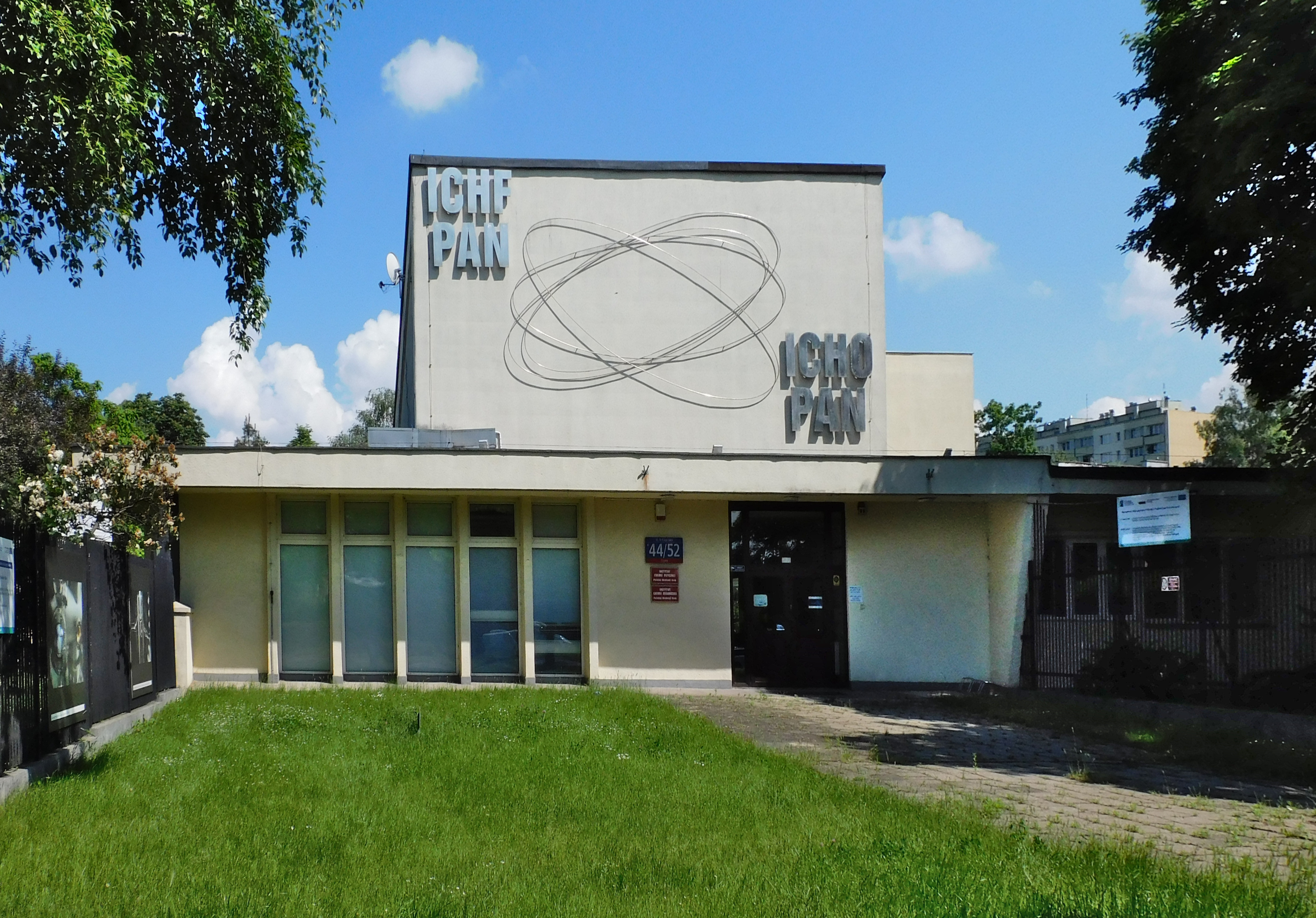
- Other name: Instytut Chemii Fizycznej Polskiej Akademii Nauk
- Focus: physical chemistry research
- Website: https://ichf.edu.pl/

The Institute of Physical Chemistry of the Polish Academy of Sciences (Polish Instytut Chemii Fizycznej Polskiej Akademii Nauk, IChF PAN) is one of numerous institutes belonging to the Polish Academy of Sciences. As its name suggests, the institute's primary research interests are in the field of physical chemistry.

== History ==
The institute was established by a resolution of the Presidium of the Government of the Polish People's Republic on 19 March 1955. It was the first chemical institute of the Polish Academy of Sciences. Its tasks were defined at that time: "The Institute of Physical Chemistry covers research on current issues of physical chemistry important from the point of view of the development of chemical sciences and the needs of the national economy".

At the beginning of its activity, the main task was to prepare scientific staff who would be able to conduct scientific research in the field of physical chemistry. The development of scientific staff was facilitated because the employed scientific workers did not have the teaching burdens required in higher education institutions.

The first Director of the Institute and, at the same time, the Chairman of the Scientific Council of the institute was prof. Wojciech Świętosławski. The subsequent directors of the Institute were prof. Michał Śmiałowski (1960–1973), prof. Wojciech Zielenkiewicz (1973–1990), prof. Jan Popielawski (1990–1992), prof. Janusz Lipkowski (1992–2003), prof. Aleksander Jabłoński (2003–2011), prof. Robert Hołyst (2011–2015), prof. Marcin Opałło (2015–2023), dr hab. Adam Kubas (since 2023).

Over the following years, the structure of the IChF changed, the number of employees increased, and new research topics emerged, which is reflected in the current structure of the institute.

== Structure ==
The institute is divided into research departments, within which research teams operate:

- Department of Physical Chemistry of Biological Systems (Head: prof. Maciej Wojtkowski).

Team leaders: prof. M. Wojtkowski, dr. Jan Guzowski and dr. hab. Jan Paczesny

- Department of Physical Chemistry of Soft Matter (Head: prof. Robert Hołyst)

Team leaders: dr. hab. Jacek Gregorowicz, dr. hab. Volodymyr Sashuk, prof. Robert Hołyst, prof. Piotr Garstecki, dr. hab. Marco Costantini

- Department of Catalysis on Metals (Head: dr. hab. Zbigniew Kaszkur)

Team leaders: dr. hab. Zbigniew Kaszkur, prof. Rafał Szmigielski and dr. hab. Juan Carlos Colmenares Quintero

- Department of Electrode Processes (Head: prof. Marcin Opałło)

Team leaders: prof. Joanna Niedziółka-Jönsson, dr hab. Martin Jönsson-Niedziółka, dr Wojciech Nogala, prof. Marcin Opałło and dr inż Emilia Witkowska-Nery

- Department of Complex Systems and Chemical Information Processing (Head: prof. Jerzy Górecki)

Team leaders: dr hab. Wojciech Góźdź and prof. Jerzy Górecki

- Department of Photochemistry and Spectroscopy (Head: prof. Jacek Waluk)

Team leaders: dr hab. Agnieszka Michota-Kamińska, dr hab. Gonzalo Angulo Nunez, prof. Robert Kołos, dr hab. Yuriy Stepanenko and prof. Jacek Waluk

- Independent teams

Leaders: prof. Janusz Lewiński, dr Bartłomiej Wacław, dr Piyush Sindhu Sharma, dr hab. Adam Kubas, prof. Robert Nowakowski, dr hab. Daniel Prochowicz and dr Tomasz Ratajczyk

- International Centre for Translational Eye Research - ICTER (International Centre for Translational Eye Research), headed by Professor Maciej Wojtkowski. ICTER's strategic foreign partner is the Institute of Ophthalmology, University College London, in the United Kingdom. The centre's international scientific partner is the University of California, Irvine, United States. The primary scientific priority of ICTER is to thoroughly investigate the dynamics and plasticity of the human eye to develop new therapies and diagnostic tools. Cutting-edge ICTER research is conducted at various levels of resolution, from single molecules to the entire architecture and function of the eye. ICTER has five research groups:
  - Physical Optics and Biophotonics Group (POB)
  - Integrated Structural Biology Group (ISB)
  - Ophthalmic Imaging and Technologies Group (IDoc)
  - Ocular Biology Group (OBi)
  - Computational Genomics Group (CGG)

== Commercialization ==
The work conducted by the institute has given rise to five companies, operating mainly in the field of medical diagnostics:

- Scope Fluidics was founded in 2010 as the first spin-off of the Institute of Physical Chemistry of the Polish Academy of Sciences. The company aimed to commercialize microfluidic technologies developed at the institute. Since its inception, the company has specialized in creating innovative solutions for medical diagnostics.
- SERSitive - manufacturer of SERS substrates for a wide range of analytical sciences, such as pharmacy, forensic laboratories, border guard laboratories and medicine.
- Siliquan - manufacturer of fluorescent silica nanomaterials.
- Cell-IN offers a reagent enabling the introduction of various types of macromolecules (from polymers and proteins to DNA molecules) into cells.
- InCellVu is developing a clinical form of a prototype device for in vivo imaging of the human retina using the new STOC-T method developed by scientists from the International Center for Eye Research.
