= Radioactive displacement law of Fajans and Soddy =

On transmutation of elements during radioactive decay

Displacements resulting from various decay modes of a radionuclide. Horizontal axis: atomic number Z. Vertical axis: neutron number N

The law of radioactive displacements, also known as Fajans's and Soddy's law, in radiochemistry and nuclear physics, is a rule governing the transmutation of elements during radioactive decay. It is named after Frederick Soddy and Kazimierz Fajans, who independently arrived at it at about the same time in 1913.

The law describes which chemical element and isotope is created during the particular type of radioactive decay:

- In alpha decay, an element is created with an atomic number less by 2 and a mass number less by four of that of the parent radioisotope, e.g.:

$${}^{238}_{92}\text{U}\to{}^{234}_{90}\text{Th}$$

- In beta decay, the mass number remains unchanged while the atomic number becomes greater by 1 than that of the parent radioisotope, e.g.:

$${}^{212}_{82}\text{Pb}\to{}^{212}_{83}\text{Bi}$$

- This corresponds to β^{−} decay or electron emission, the only form of beta decay which had been observed when Fajans and Soddy proposed their law in 1913. Later, in the 1930s, other forms of beta decay known as β^{+} decay (positron emission) and electron capture were discovered, in which the atomic number becomes less by 1 than that of the parent radioisotope, e.g.:

$${}^{144}_{61}\text{Pm}\to{}^{144}_{60}\text{Nd}$$

== See also ==
- Decay modes in tabular form
- Decay chain
