= Protactinium monoxide =

Names
- IUPAC name Protactinium(II) oxide

Identifiers
CAS Number	60936-60-9
3D model (JSmol)	Interactive image
- InChI: InChI=1S/O.Pa/q-2;+2 Key: QQSJTSKFWWYZFZ-UHFFFAOYSA-N
- SMILES: [O-2].[Pa+2]

Properties
Chemical formula	PaO
Molar mass	247.035 g mol^{−1}
Appearance	black crystals
Density	13.44 g/cm^{3}

Structure
Crystal structure	rocksalt
Space group	Fm3̅m, No. 225
- Except where otherwise noted, data are given for materials in their standard state (at 25 °C [77 °F], 100 kPa). Infobox references

Protactinium monoxide is a radioactive inorganic compound and one of the oxides of protactinium. Its chemical formula is PaO. It is a black solid that crystallizes in the rock-salt structure. Protactinium monoxide can be produced in minute quantities from the oxidation of protactinium. The protactinium monoxide cation (PaO+) is very active and can activate hydrocarbons such as alkenes.
