= Fajans' rules =

Explains the covalent character in molecules

In inorganic chemistry, Fajans' rules, formulated by Kazimierz Fajans in 1923, are used to predict whether a chemical bond will be covalent or ionic, and depend on the charge on the cation and the relative sizes of the cation and anion. They can be summarized in the following table:

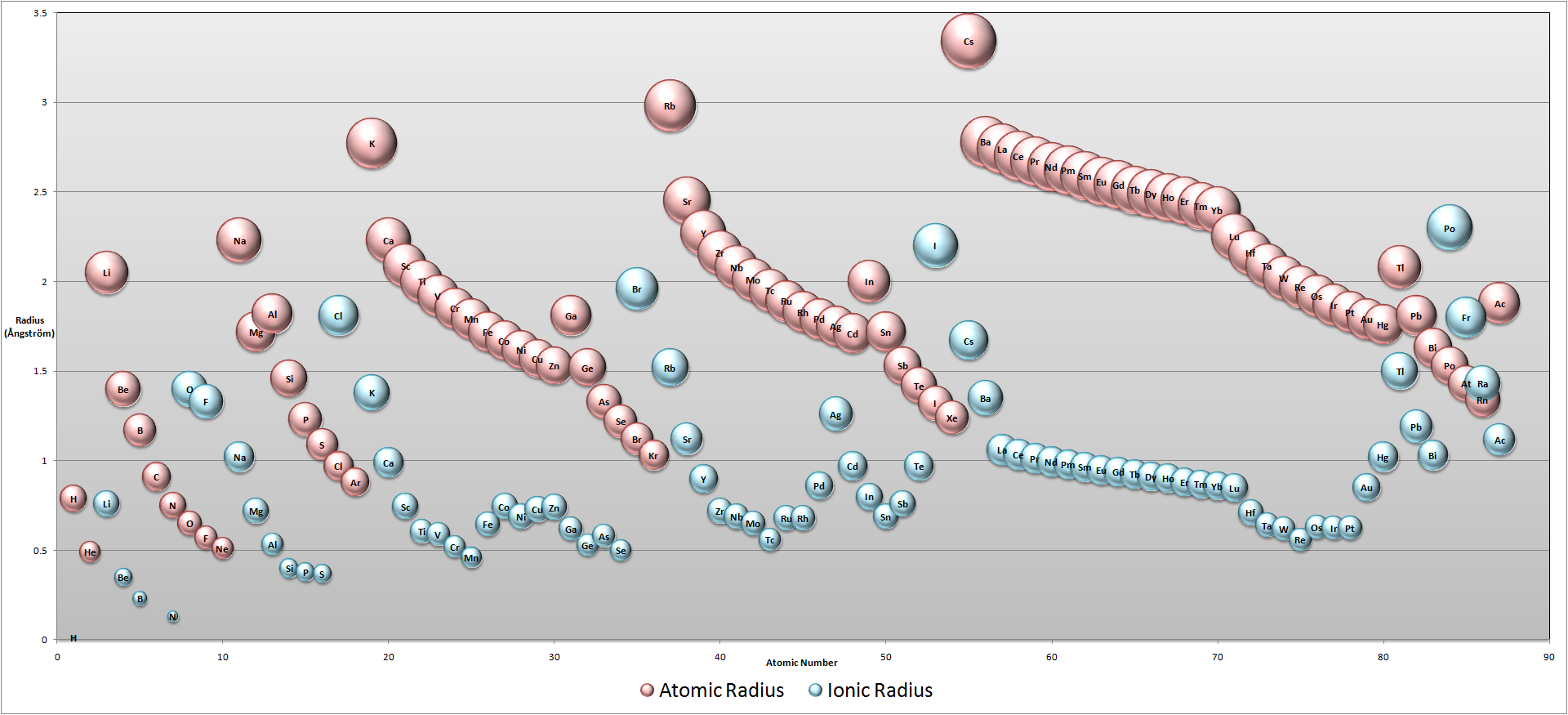
Chart illustrating the relationship between atomic and ionic radius

Ionic Character	Covalent Character
Low positive charge	High positive charge
Large cation	Small cation
Small anion	Large anion

Although the bond in a compound like X+Y- may be considered to be 100% ionic, it will always have some degree of covalent character. When two oppositely charged ions (X+ and Y-) approach each other, the cation attracts electrons in the outermost shell of the anion but repels the positively charged nucleus. This results in a distortion, deformation or polarization of the anion. If the degree of polarization is quite small, an ionic bond is formed, while if the degree of polarization is large, a covalent bond results.

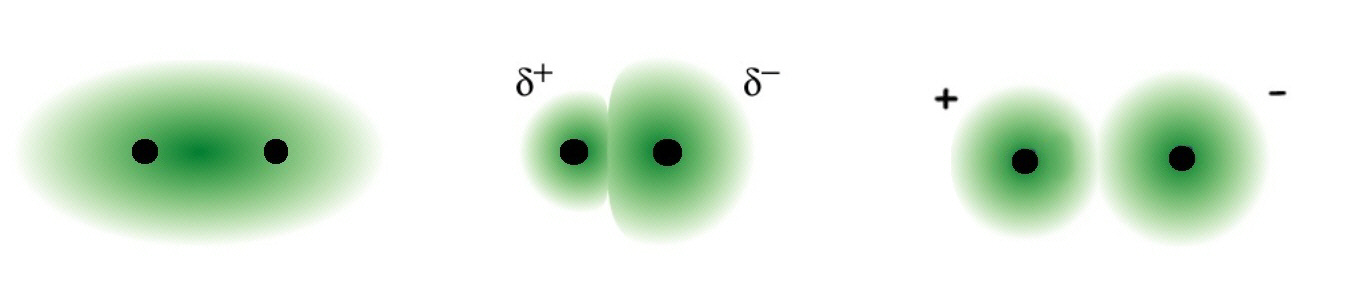
Non-polar covalent bond (left), polar covalent bond (center), ionic bond(right)

Polarization of the anion depends upon:

- Charge density of cation: High positive charge and small size of the cation leads to high polarizing power of the cation.
- Size of anion: The larger the anion, the less tightly it holds on to its valence electrons. Therefore, large size of the anion leads to high polarizability of the anion.
- Valence electronic configuration: The noble gas configuration in a cation offers better shielding and thus less polarizing power. This creates exceptions, for example Hg^{2+} despite having lesser charge density (r+ = 102 pm) is more polarizing than Ca^{2+} (r+ = 100 pm), which has a noble gas configuration.

Two contrasting examples can illustrate the variation in effects:

- In the case of aluminum iodide an ionic bond with much covalent character is present. In the AlI_{3} bonding, the aluminum has a net charge of +3. This creates a pull on the electron cloud of the iodine. Since the iodine atom is relatively large, its outer shell electrons are well shielded from the nuclear charge, and hence more polarizable. The aluminum cation attracts the electron cloud of iodine, distorting it. As the electron cloud of the iodine nears the aluminum cation, it "cancels" out the positive charge of the aluminum cation. This produces an ionic bond with covalent character.

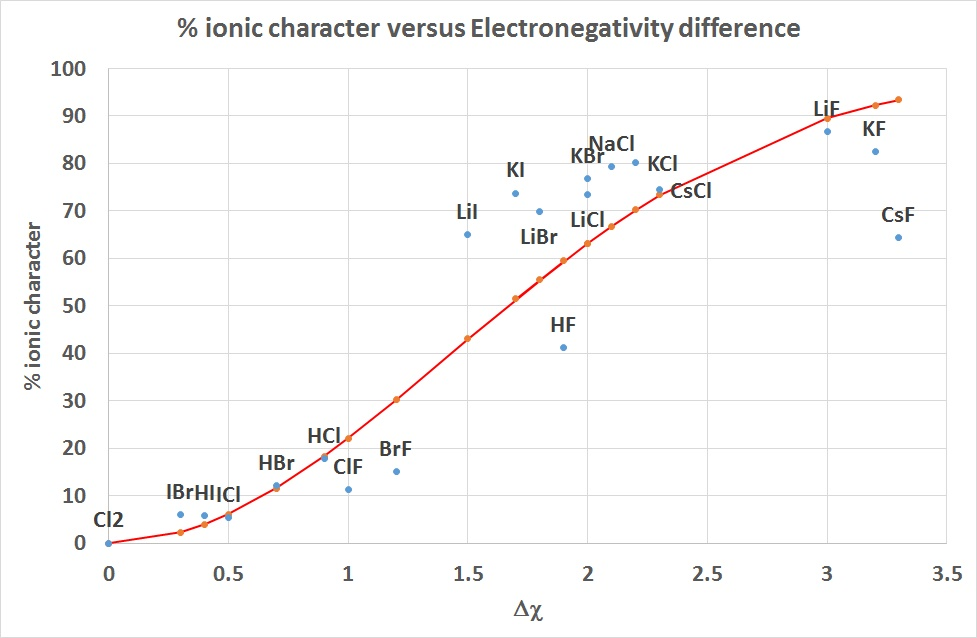
Graph of percentage ionic character

- The situation is different in the case of aluminum fluoride, AlF_{3}. In this case, iodine is replaced by fluorine, a relatively small highly electronegative atom. The fluorine's electron cloud is less shielded from the nuclear charge and will thus be less polarizable. Thus, we get an ionic compound with only a slight covalent character.

Thus sodium chloride (due to a relatively large cation) and aluminum fluoride (due to a relatively small anion) are both ionic; but aluminium iodide is covalent. Likewise, CaCl_{2} (having a noble gas configuration in cation,) is ionic but HgCl_{2} is covalent.
