= Protactinium triiodide =

Names
- IUPAC name Protactinium triiodide
- Other names Protactinium(III) iodide

Identifiers
CAS Number	19415-71-5
3D model (JSmol)	Interactive image
- InChI: InChI=1S/3HI.Pa/h3*1H;/q;;;+3/p-3 Key: CTZOGZYRIBUUIZ-UHFFFAOYSA-K
- SMILES: I[Pa](I)I

Properties
Chemical formula	I_{3}Pa
Molar mass	611.74929 g·mol^{−1}
Appearance	dark brown solid
- Except where otherwise noted, data are given for materials in their standard state (at 25 °C [77 °F], 100 kPa). Infobox references

Protactinium triiodide is an inorganic chemical compound with the chemical formula PaI_{3}.

== Synthesis ==
The compound can be obtained from PaI_{5} by heating at 350-380 °C in a continuously pumping vacuum.

== Physical properties ==
PaI_{3} forms a dark brown solid. The compound has a PaBr_{3} crystal structure.
