= Protactinium tetrafluoride =

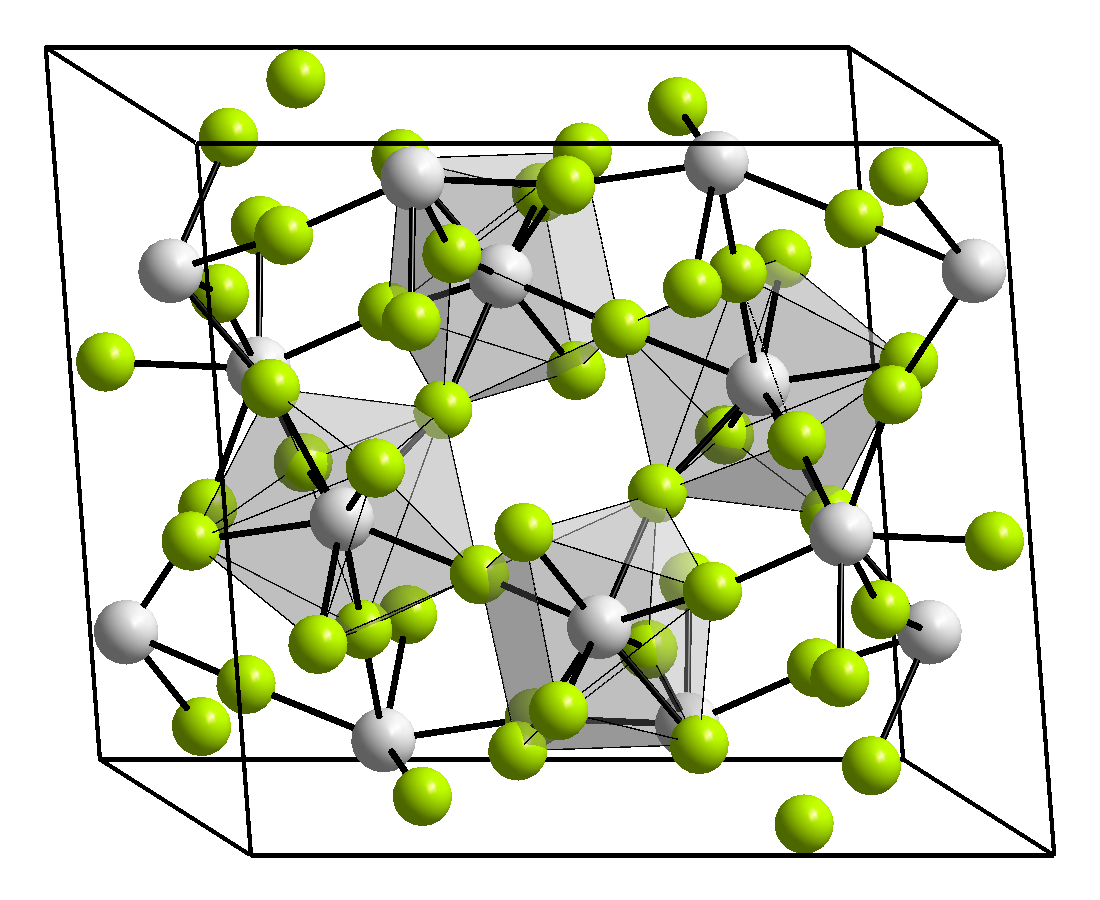

Identifiers
CAS Number	13842-89-2
3D model (JSmol)	Interactive image
- InChI: InChI=1S/4FH.Pa/h4*1H;/q;;;;+4/p-4 Key: CRDGDRUMLTUCQA-UHFFFAOYSA-J
- SMILES: [Pa+4].[F-].[F-].[F-].[F-]

Properties
Chemical formula	F_{4}Pa
Molar mass	307.02949 g·mol^{−1}
Appearance	dark brown crystals

Related compounds
Related compounds	Uranium tetrafluoride, neptunium tetrafluoride, plutonium tetrafluoride
- Except where otherwise noted, data are given for materials in their standard state (at 25 °C [77 °F], 100 kPa). Infobox references

Protactinium tetrafluoride is a binary inorganic compound of protactinium metal and fluorine with the chemical formula PaF_{4}.

== Synthesis ==
Protactinium tetrafluoride can be obtained by fluorinating protactinium(IV) oxide with a hydrogen fluoride / hydrogen mixture at 600 °C:

PaO_{2} + 4HF → PaF_{4} + 2H_{2}O

The effect of hydrogen fluoride and hydrogen on protactinium(V) oxide:

Pa_{2}O_{5} + 8HF + H_{2} → 2PaF_{4} + 5H_{2}O

== Physical properties ==
PaF_{4} forms dark brown, monoclinic, needlelike crystals of UF_{4} structure. The cell parameters are: a = 1.27 nm, b = 1.07 nm, c = 0.842 nm, β = 126.3°.

The compound is soluble in aqueous ammonium fluoride solutions.

== Chemical properties ==
Protactinium tetrafluoride reacts with oxygen and fluorine:

2PaF_{4} + F_{2} → 2PaF_{5}

4PaF_{4} + O_{2} → 2Pa_{2}OF_{8}

The compound reacts with alkalis:

PaF_{4} + 4NaOH → PaO_{2} + 4NaF + 2H_{2}O

The metal is displaced from the salt by barium:

PaF_{4} + 2Ba → Pa + 2BaF_{2}
