= Uranium(III) iodide =

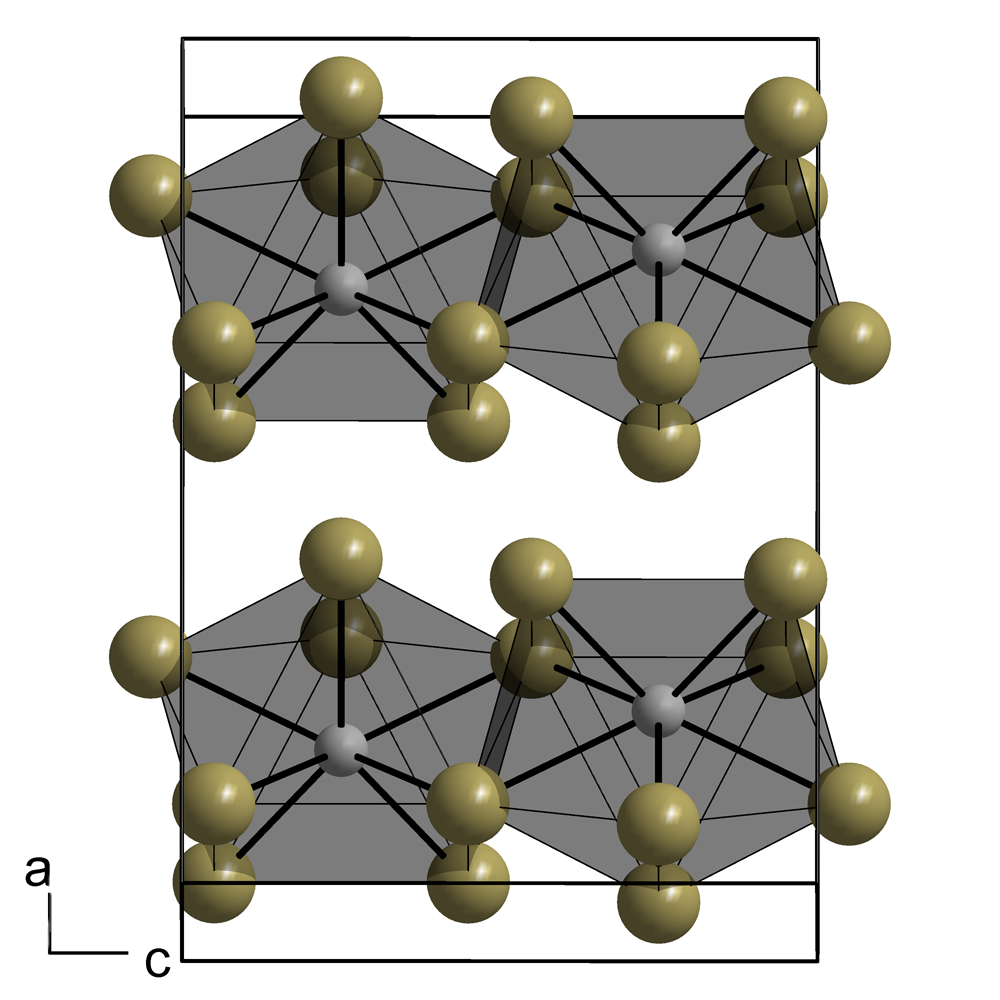

Identifiers
CAS Number	13775-18-3
3D model (JSmol)	Interactive image
ChemSpider	75546
ECHA InfoCard	100.033.992
EC Number	237-406-4
PubChem CID	53249297
CompTox Dashboard (EPA)	DTXSID2065626
- InChI: InChI=1S/3HI.U/h3*1H;/q;;;+3/p-3 Key: CDQDFXDBVYMPJX-UHFFFAOYSA-K
- SMILES: [I-].[I-].[I-].[U+3]

Properties
Chemical formula	UI_{3}
Molar mass	618.74232 g/mol
Appearance	black solid
Density	6.78 g/cm^{3}
Melting point	766 °C (1,411 °F; 1,039 K)

Structure
Crystal structure	orthorhombic
Space group	Ccmm, No. 63
Lattice constant	a = 432.8 pm, b = 1401.1 pm, c = 1000.5 pm
Formula units (Z)	4

Hazards
- GHS labelling
Pictograms	(GHS06: Toxic) (GHS08: Health hazard) (GHS09: Environmental hazard)
Signal word	Danger
Hazard statements	H300, H330, H373, H411
- Except where otherwise noted, data are given for materials in their standard state (at 25 °C [77 °F], 100 kPa). Infobox references

Uranium triiodide is an inorganic compound with the chemical formula UI_{3}. It is a black solid that is soluble in water.

== Production ==
Uranium triiodide can be obtained from the direct reaction of its constituent elements:

2 U + 3 I_{2} → 2 UI_{3}

When the reaction is conducted in tetrahydrofuran (THF), the product is the blue complex UI_{3}(THF)_{4}.

== Properties ==
It crystallizes in the orthorhombic crystal system (plutonium tribromide-type) in the space group Ccmm with the lattice parameters a = 432.8 pm, b = 1401.1 pm, and c = 1000.5 pm and four formula units per unit cell.

Uranium triiodide can be used as a Lewis acid catalyst for various Diels-Alder reactions carried out under mild conditions.
