= Protactinium(V) chloride =

Names
- IUPAC name Protactinium(V) chloride
- Other names Protactinium pentachloride, Protactinium chloride

Identifiers
| CAS Number | 13760-41-3 |
| 3D model (JSmol) | Interactive image |
| ChemSpider | 9222996 |
| PubChem CID | 11047828 |
| CompTox Dashboard (EPA) | DTXSID401045196 |
- InChI: InChI=1S/5ClH.Pa/h5*1H;/q;;;;;+5/p-5 Key: QRPCDPJECLHYKR-UHFFFAOYSA-I
- SMILES: Cl[Pa](Cl)(Cl)(Cl)Cl

Properties
| Chemical formula | PaCl_{5} |
| Molar mass | 408.301 g/mol |
| Appearance | yellow monoclinic crystals |
| Density | 3.74 g/cm^{3} |
| Melting point | 306 °C (583 °F; 579 K) |
| Boiling point | 420 °C (788 °F; 693 K) |

Structure
| Crystal structure | monoclinic, mS24 |
| Space group | c12/c1, #15 |
| Coordination geometry | Pa, 7, pentagonal bipyramidal Cl, 1 and 2 |

Related compounds
| Other anions | Protactinium(V) fluoride Protactinium(V) bromide Protactinium(V) iodide |
| Other cations | Praseodymium(III) chloride Uranium(IV) chloride Thorium(IV) chloride |
| Related compounds | Protactinium(IV) chloride |
- Except where otherwise noted, data are given for materials in their standard state (at 25 °C [77 °F], 100 kPa). Infobox references

Protactinium(V) chloride is the chemical compound composed of protactinium and chlorine with the formula PaCl_{5}. It forms yellow monoclinic crystals and has a unique structure composed of chains of 7 coordinate pentagonal bipyramids which share their edges.

Protactinium(V) chloride can react with boron tribromide at high temperatures to form protactinium(V) bromide. It also reacts with fluorine to form protactinium(V) fluoride at high temperatures.

== See also ==
- Protactinium(IV) chloride
