= Uranium(IV) iodide =

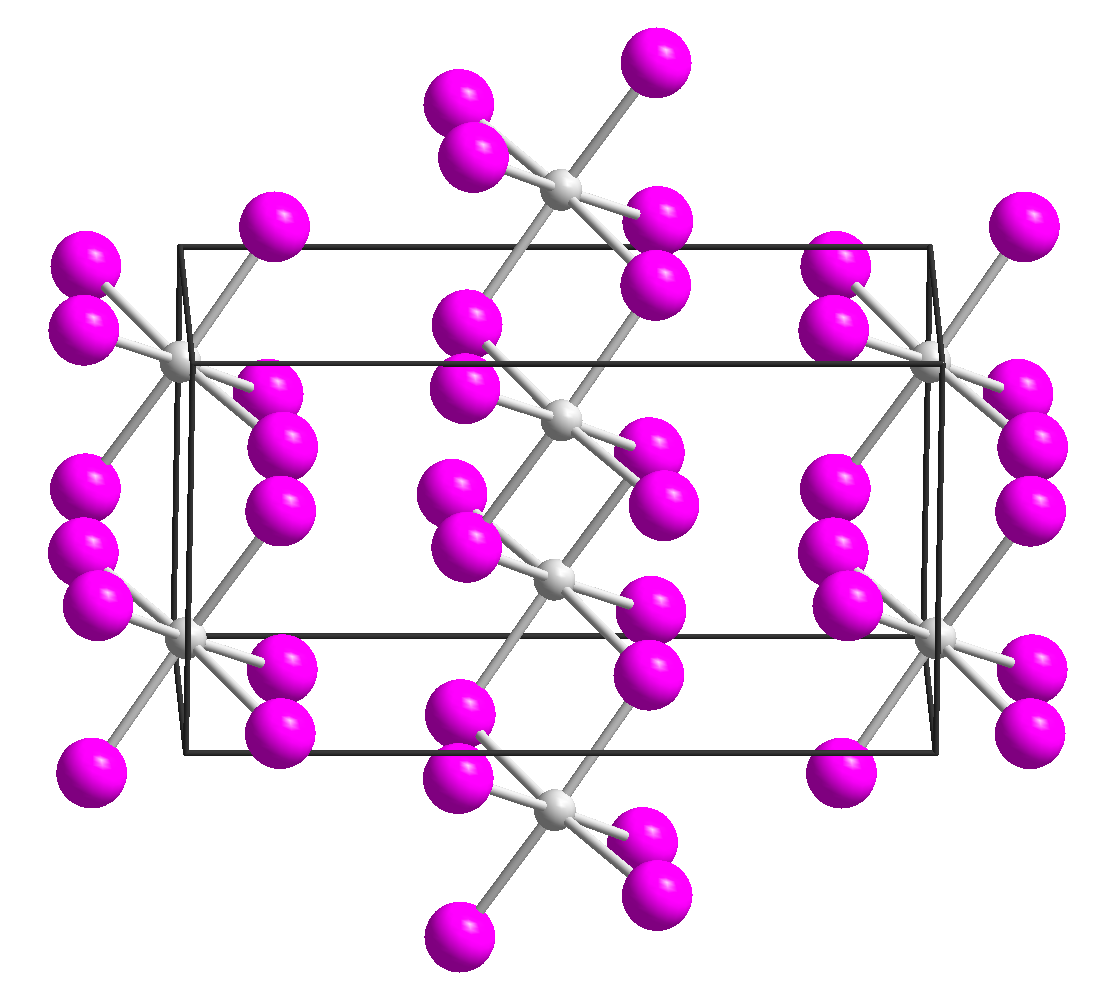
- __ U^{4+} __ I^{−}

Identifiers
CAS Number	13470-22-9
3D model (JSmol)	Interactive image
ChemSpider	75343
ECHA InfoCard	100.033.381
EC Number	236-735-0
PubChem CID	83508
CompTox Dashboard (EPA)	DTXSID9065497
- InChI: InChI=1S/4HI.U/h4*1H;/q;;;;+4/p-4 Key: PUBUIOWBJCONDZ-UHFFFAOYSA-J
- SMILES: I[U](I)(I)I

Properties
Chemical formula	UI_{4}
Molar mass	745.647 g/mol
Appearance	black hygroscopic crystals

Structure
Crystal structure	monoclinic
Space group	C2/c, No. 15
Lattice constant	a = 1396.7 pm, b = 847.2 pm, c = 751 pm α = 90°, β = 90.54°, γ = 90°

Hazards
- Occupational safety and health (OHS/OSH)
Main hazards	Radioactive
- GHS labelling
Pictograms	(GHS06: Toxic) (GHS08: Health hazard) (GHS09: Environmental hazard)
Signal word	Danger
Hazard statements	H300, H330, H373, H411
- Except where otherwise noted, data are given for materials in their standard state (at 25 °C [77 °F], 100 kPa). Infobox references

Uranium(IV) iodide, also known as uranium tetraiodide, is an inorganic chemical compound. It is a salt of uranium in oxidation state +4 and iodine.

== Preparation ==
Uranium tetraiodide can be prepared from the reaction between uranium and an excess of iodine.

== Properties ==
Uranium tetraiodide is a black solid and forms needle-like crystals. Upon heating, it dissociates into uranium triiodide and iodine gas. It crystallizes in the monoclinic crystal system, space group C2/c.
