= Protactinium(V) bromide =

Names
- IUPAC name Protactinium(V) bromide

Identifiers
CAS Number	15608-38-5
3D model (JSmol)	Interactive image
- InChI: InChI=1S/5BrH.Pa/h5*1H;/q;;;;;+5/p-5 Key: NWILNELACOZBOD-UHFFFAOYSA-I
- SMILES: Br[Pa](Br)(Br)(Br)Br

Properties
Chemical formula	PaBr_{5}
Molar mass	630.556 g mol^{−1}
Appearance	red solid
Density	4.98 g/cm^{3}

Structure
Crystal structure	monoclinic
Space group	P2_{1}/c , No. 14

Related compounds
Other anions	Protactinium(V) fluoride Protactinium(V) chloride Protactinium(V) iodide
Other cations	Praseodymium(III) bromide Thorium(IV) bromide Uranium(IV) bromide
- Except where otherwise noted, data are given for materials in their standard state (at 25 °C [77 °F], 100 kPa). Infobox references

Protactinium(V) bromide is an inorganic compound. It is a halide of protactinium, consisting of protactinium and bromine. It is radioactive and has a chemical formula of PaBr_{5}, which is a red crystal of the monoclinic crystal system.

== Preparation ==
Protactinium(V) bromide can be obtained by reacting protactinium(V) chloride with boron tribromide at 500 to 550 °C.

3PaCl_{5} + 5BBr_{3} → 3PaBr_{5} + 5BCl_{3}

It can also be obtained by reacting protactinium(V) oxide with aluminum bromide at 400 °C.

== Physical properties ==
Protactinium(V) bromide is an orange-red, crystalline, extremely moisture-sensitive solid that reacts violently with water and ammonia, but is persistent in absolutely dry air. It is insoluble in isopentane, dichloromethane and benzene, and in anhydrous acetonitrile is dissolves to form PaBr_{5}•4CH_{3}CN. It comes in several modifications. Below 400 °C as an α-modification and above 400 °C as a β-modification. The α-form has a monoclinic crystal structure of the space group P2_{1}/c (No. 14) and lattice parameters a = 1296 pm, b = 1282 pm, c = 992 pm, β = 108° and the β-form also has monoclinic crystal structure with space group P2_{1}/n (No. 14, position 2) and lattice parameters a = 838.5 pm, b = 1120.5 pm, c = 895.0 pm, β = 91.1°. The β form exists as a dimer. At 400 °C in a vacuum, protactinium(V) bromide sublimes. A γ-form, which has a β-uranium(V) chloride-type crystal structure, has also been detected.
