= Protactinium(IV) oxide =

Names
- IUPAC name Protactinium(IV) oxide

Identifiers
CAS Number	12036-03-2
3D model (JSmol)	Interactive image
CompTox Dashboard (EPA)	DTXSID701029533
- InChI: InChI=1S/2O.Pa Key: FUMADFKVOBAYPE-UHFFFAOYSA-N
- SMILES: O=[Pa]=O

Properties
Chemical formula	O_{2}Pa
Molar mass	263.034 g·mol^{−1}
Appearance	Black crystals
Melting point	2,927 °C (5,301 °F; 3,200 K)

Structure
Crystal structure	Fluorite (cubic), cF12
Space group	Fm3̅m, No. 225
Lattice constant	a = 544.6 pm

Hazards
NFPA 704 (fire diamond)	4

Related compounds
Other cations	Thorium(IV) oxide Uranium(IV) oxide
- Except where otherwise noted, data are given for materials in their standard state (at 25 °C [77 °F], 100 kPa). Infobox references

Protactinium(IV) oxide is a chemical compound with the formula PaO_{2}. The black oxide is formed by reducing Pa_{2}O_{5} with hydrogen at 1 550 °C. Protactinium(IV) oxide does not dissolve in H_{2}SO_{4}, HNO_{3}, or HCl solutions, but reacts with HF.

As protactinium(IV) oxide, like other protactinium compounds, is radioactive, toxic and very rare, it has no known technological use.
