= Protactinium(V) oxide =

- Protactinium(V) oxide

Names
- IUPAC name Protactinium(V) oxide

Identifiers
CAS Number	12036-75-8
3D model (JSmol)	Interactive image; Interactive image
- InChI: InChI=1S/5O.2Pa Key: LDJMPPCAULZCAH-UHFFFAOYSA-N; InChI=1S/10O.4Pa Key: YHCILLCTPZINHI-UHFFFAOYSA-N
- SMILES: O=[Pa](=O)O[Pa](=O)=O; O=[Pa]12O[Pa]3(=O)O[Pa](=O)(O1)O[Pa](=O)(O2)O3

Properties
Chemical formula	Pa_{2}O_{5}
Molar mass	542.0688 g mol^{−1}
Appearance	White, opaque crystals

Structure
Crystal structure	cubic
Space group	Fm-3m, No. 225

Hazards
- Occupational safety and health (OHS/OSH)
Main hazards	highly toxic, radioactive
- GHS labelling
Pictograms	(GHS06: Toxic) (GHS08: Health hazard) (GHS09: Environmental hazard)
NFPA 704 (fire diamond)	4 0 0
- Except where otherwise noted, data are given for materials in their standard state (at 25 °C [77 °F], 100 kPa). Infobox references

Protactinium(V) oxide is a chemical compound with the formula Pa_{2}O_{5}. When it is reduced with hydrogen, it forms PaO_{2}. Aristid von Grosse was first to prepare 2 mg of Pa_{2}O_{5} in 1927. Pa_{2}O_{5} does not dissolve in concentrated HNO_{3}, but dissolves in HF and in a HF + H_{2}SO_{4} mixture and reacts at high temperatures with solid oxides of alkali metal and alkaline earth metals.

As protactinium(V) oxide, like other protactinium compounds, is radioactive, toxic and very rare, it has very limited technological use. Mixed oxides of Nb, Mg, Ga and Mn, doped with 0.005–0.52% Pa_{2}O_{5}, have been used as high temperature dielectrics (up to 1300 °C) for ceramic capacitors.
