= List of inorganic compounds =

Although most compounds are referred to by their IUPAC systematic names (following IUPAC nomenclature), traditional names have also been kept where they are in wide use or of significant historical interests.

== A ==
=== Ac ===
- Actinium(III) chloride – AcCl_{3}
- Actinium(III) fluoride – AcF_{3}
- Actinium(III) oxide – Ac_{2}O_{3}
- Actinium(III) sulfide – Ac_{2}S_{3}
- Actinium(III) nitrate – Ac(NO_{3})_{3}
- Actinium(III) bromide – AcBr_{3}
- Actinium(III) hydroxide – Ac(OH)_{3}
- Actinium(III) iodide – AcI_{3}
- Actinium(III) phosphate – AcPO_{4}

=== Al ===
- Aluminium antimonide – AlSb
- Aluminium arsenate – AlAsO_{4}
- Aluminium arsenide – AlAs
- Aluminium diboride – AlB_{2}
- Aluminium bromide – AlBr_{3}
- Aluminium carbide – Al_{4}C_{3}
- Aluminium iodide – AlI_{3}
- Aluminium nitride – AlN
- Aluminium oxide – Al_{2}O_{3}
- Aluminium phosphide – AlP
- Aluminium chloride – AlCl_{3}
- Aluminium fluoride – AlF_{3}
- Aluminium hydroxide – Al(OH)_{3}
- Aluminium nitrate – Al(NO_{3})_{3}
- Aluminium sulfide – Al_{2}S_{3}
- Aluminium sulfate – Al_{2}(SO_{4})_{3}
- Aluminium potassium sulfate – KAl(SO_{4})_{2}
- Aluminium hydride – AlH_{3}

=== Am ===
- Americium(II) bromide – AmBr_{2}
- Americium(III) bromide – AmBr_{3}
- Americium(II) chloride – AmCl_{2}
- Americium(III) chloride – AmCl_{3}
- Americium(III) fluoride – AmF_{3}
- Americium(IV) fluoride – AmF_{4}
- Americium(II) iodide – AmI_{2}
- Americium(III) iodide – AmI_{3}
- Americium dioxide – AmO_{2}

=== NH_{3}/[NH_{4}]^{+} ===
- Ammonia – NH_{3}
- Ammonium azide – [NH_{4}]N_{3}
- Ammonium bicarbonate – [NH_{4}]HCO_{3}
- Ammonium bisulfate – [NH_{4}]HSO_{4}
- Ammonium bromide – NH_{4}Br
- Ammonium chromate – [NH_{4}]_{2}CrO_{4}
- Ammonium cerium(IV) nitrate – [NH_{4}]_{2}[Ce(NO_{3})_{6}]
- Ammonium cerium(IV) sulfate – [NH_{4}]_{4}[Ce(SO_{4})_{4}]
- Ammonium chloride – [NH_{4}]Cl
- Ammonium chlorate – [NH_{4}]ClO_{3}
- Ammonium cyanide – [NH_{4}]CN
- Ammonium dichromate – [NH_{4}]_{2}Cr_{2}O_{7}
- Ammonium dihydrogen phosphate – [NH_{4}]H_{2}PO_{4}
- Ammonium hexafluoroaluminate – AlF_{6}H_{12} N_{3}
- Ammonium hexafluorophosphate – F_{6}H4 NP
- Ammonium hexachloroplatinate – [NH_{4}]_{2}[PtCl_{6}]
- Ammonium hexafluorosilicate
- Ammonium hexafluorotitanate
- Ammonium hexafluorozirconate
- Ammonium hydroxide – [NH_{4}]OH
- Ammonium nitrate – [NH_{4}]NO_{3}
- Ammonium orthomolybdate – [NH_{4}]_{2}MoO_{4}
- Ammonium sulfamate – [NH_{4}]SO_{3}NH_{2}
- Ammonium sulfide – [NH_{4}]_{2}S
- Ammonium sulfite – [NH_{4}]_{2}SO_{3}
- Ammonium sulfate – [NH_{4}]_{2}SO_{4}
- Ammonium perchlorate – [NH_{4}]ClO_{4}
- Ammonium permanganate – [NH_{4}]MnO_{4}
- Ammonium persulfate – [NH_{4}]_{2}S_{2}O_{8}
- Ammonium diamminetetrathiocynatochromate(III) – [NH_{4}][Cr(SCN)_{4}(NH_{3})_{2}]
- Ammonium thiocyanate – [NH_{4}]SCN
- Ammonium triiodide – [NH_{4}][I_{3}]
- Diammonium dioxido(dioxo)molybdenum – H_{8}MoN_{2}O_{4}
- Diammonium phosphate – [NH_{4}]_{2}HPO_{4}
- Tetramethylammonium perchlorate – [N(CH_{3})_{4}]ClO_{4}

=== Sb ===
- Antimony hydride (stybine) – SbH_{3}
- Antimony pentachloride – SbCl_{5}
- Antimony pentafluoride – SbF_{5}
- Antimony potassium tartrate – K_{2}Sb_{2}(C_{4}H_{2}O_{6})_{2}
- Antimony sulfate – Sb_{2}(SO_{4})_{3}
- Antimony trichloride – SbCl_{3}
- Antimony trifluoride – SbF_{3}
- Antimony trioxide – Sb_{2}O_{3}
- Antimony trisulfide – Sb_{2}S_{3}
- Antimony pentasulfide – Sb_{2}S_{5}

=== Ar ===
- Argon fluorohydride – HArF

=== As ===
- Arsenic trifluoride – AsF_{3}
- Arsenic triiodide –AsI_{3}
- Arsenic pentafluoride – AsF_{5}
- Arsenic trioxide (Arsenic(III) oxide) – As_{2}O_{3}
- Arsenous acid – As(OH)_{3}
- Arsenic acid – AsO(OH)_{3}
- Arsine – AsH_{3}

== B ==
=== Ba ===
- Barium azide – Ba(N_{3})_{2}
- Barium bromide – BaBr_{2}
- Barium carbonate – BaCO_{3}
- Barium chlorate – Ba(ClO_{3})_{2}
- Barium chloride – BaCl_{2}
- Barium chromate – BaCrO_{4}
- Barium ferrate – BaFeO_{4}
- Barium ferrite – BaFe_{12}O_{19}
- Barium fluoride – BaF_{2}
- Barium hydroxide – Ba(OH)_{2}
- Barium hexaboride — BaB_{6}
- Barium iodide – BaI_{2}
- Barium manganate – BaMnO_{4}
- Barium nitrate – Ba(NO_{3})_{2}
- Barium oxalate – Ba(C_{2}O_{4})
- Barium oxide – BaO
- Barium permanganate – Ba(MnO_{4})_{2}
- Barium peroxide – BaO_{2}
- Barium sulfate – BaSO_{4}
- Barium sulfide – BaS
- Barium titanate – BaTiO_{3}
- Barium thiocyanate – Ba(SCN)_{2}

=== Be ===
- Beryllium borohydride – Be[BH_{4}]_{2}
- Beryllium bromide – BeBr_{2}
- Beryllium carbonate – BeCO_{3}
- Beryllium chloride – BeCl_{2}
- Beryllium fluoride – BeF_{2}
- Beryllium hydride – BeH_{2}
- Beryllium hydroxide – Be(OH)_{2}
- Beryllium iodide – BeI_{2}
- Beryllium nitrate – Be(NO_{3})_{2}
- Beryllium nitride – Be_{3}N_{2}
- Beryllium oxide – BeO
- Beryllium sulfate – BeSO_{4}
- Beryllium sulfide – BeS
- Beryllium telluride – BeTe

=== Bi ===
- Bismuth chloride – BiCl_{3}
- Bismuth ferrite – BiFeO_{3}
- Bismuth hydroxide–BiH_{3}O_{3}
- Bismuth(III) iodide–BiI_{3}
- Bismuth(III) nitrate–BiN_{3}O_{9}
- Bismuth(III) oxide – Bi_{2}O_{3}
- Bismuth oxychloride – BiOCl
- Bismuth pentafluoride – BiF_{5}
- Bismuth(III) sulfide– Bi_{2}S_{3}
- Bismuth(III) telluride – Bi_{2}Te_{3}
- Bismuth tribromide – BiBr_{3}
- Bismuth tungstate – Bi_{2}WO_{6}

=== B ===
- Borane – BH_{3}
- Borax – Na_{2}B_{4}O_{7}·10H_{2}O
- Borazine – B_{3}H_{6}N_{3}
- Borazocine ((3Z,5Z,7Z)-azaborocine) – B_{4}H_{8}N_{4}
- Boric acid – H_{3}BO_{3}
- Boron carbide – B_{4}C
- Boron nitride – BN
- Boron phosphate – BPO_{4}
- Boron phosphide – BP
- Boron suboxide – B_{6}O
- Boron tribromide – BBr_{3}
- Boron trichloride – BCl_{3}
- Boron trifluoride – BF_{3}
- Boron triiodide –BI_{3}
- Boron oxide – B_{2}O_{3}
- Boroxine – B_{3}H_{3}O_{3}
- Calcium hexaboride – CaB_{6}
- Decaborane – B_{10}H_{14}
- Diborane – B_{2}H_{6}
- Diboron tetrachloride – B_{2}Cl_{4}
- Diboron tetrafluoride – B_{2}F_{4}
- Fluoroboric acid – HBF_{4}
- Hexaborane(10) – B_{6}H_{10}
- Hexaborane(12) – B_{6}H_{12}
- Lanthanum hexaboride – LaB_{6}
- Magnesium diboride – MgB_{2}
- Metaboric acid – H_{3}B_{3}O_{6}
- Octadecaborane – B_{18}H_{22}
- Ortho-carborane – C_{2}B_{10}H_{12}
- Pentaborane – B_{5}H_{9}
- Pentaborane(11) – B_{5}H_{11}
- Sodium metaborate – NaBO_{2}
- Sodium perborate – NaBO_{3}
- Sodium tetrahydroxyborate – NaB(OH)_{4}
- Tetraborane – B_{4}H_{10}
- Tetrahydroxydiboron – B_{2}H_{4}O_{4}

=== Br ===
- Bromine monochloride – BrCl
- Bromine pentafluoride – BrF_{5}
- Perbromic acid – HBrO_{4}
- Aluminium Bromide – AlBr_{3}
- Ammonium bromide – NH_{4}Br
- Boron tribromide – BBr_{3}
- Bromic acid – HBrO_{3}
- Bromine monoxide – Br_{2}O
- Bromine pentafluoride – BrF_{5}
- Bromine trifluoride – BrF_{3}
- Bromine monofluoride – BrF
- Calcium bromide – CaBr_{2}
- Carbon tetrabromide – CBr_{4}
- Copper(I) bromide – CuBr
- Copper(II) bromide – CuBr_{2}
- Hydrobromic acid – HBr(aq)
- Hydrogen bromide – HBr
- Hypobromous acid – HOBr
- Iodine monobromide – IBr
- Iron(II) bromide – FeBr_{2}
- Iron(III) bromide – FeBr_{3}
- Lead(II) bromide – PbBr_{2}
- Lithium bromide – LiBr
- Magnesium bromide – MgBr_{2}
- Mercury(I) bromide – Hg_{2}Br_{2}
- Mercury(II) bromide – HgBr_{2}
- Nitrosyl bromide – NOBr
- Phosphorus pentabromide – PBr_{5}
- Phosphorus tribromide – PBr_{3}
- Phosphorus heptabromide – PBr_{7}
- Potassium bromide – KBr
- Potassium bromate – KBrO_{3}
- Potassium perbromate – KBrO_{4}
- Tribromosilane – HSiBr_{3}
- Silicon tetrabromide – SiBr_{4}
- Silver bromide – AgBr
- Sodium bromide – NaBr
- Sodium bromate – NaBrO_{3}
- Sodium perbromate – NaBrO_{4}
- Thionyl bromide – SOBr_{2}
- Tin(II) bromide – SnBr_{2}
- Zinc bromide – ZnBr_{2}

== C ==
=== Cd ===
- Cadmium arsenide – Cd_{3}As_{2}
- Cadmium bromide – CdBr_{2}
- Cadmium chloride – CdCl_{2}
- Cadmium fluoride – CdF_{2}
- Cadmium iodide – CdI_{2}
- Cadmium nitrate – Cd(NO_{3})_{2}
- Cadmium oxide – CdO
- Cadmium phosphide – Cd_{3}P_{2}
- Cadmium selenide – CdSe
- Cadmium sulfate – CdSO_{4}
- Cadmium sulfide – CdS
- Cadmium telluride – CdTe

=== Cs ===
- Caesium bicarbonate – CsHCO_{3}
- Caesium bromide – CsBr
- Caesium carbonate – Cs_{2}CO_{3}
- Caesium chloride – CsCl
- Caesium chromate – Cs_{2}CrO_{4}
- Caesium dichloroiodate – CsICl_{2}
- Caesium dodecaborate – Cs_{2}B_{12}H_{12}
- Caesium fluoride – CsF
- Caesium heptafluoroxenate – CsXeF_{7}
- Caesium hydride – CsH
- Caesium hydrogen sulfate – CsHSO_{4}
- Caesium iodide – CsI
- Caesium monoxide – Cs_{2}O
- Caesium nitrate – CsNO_{3}
- Caesium ozonide – CsO_{3}
- Caesium perchlorate – CsClO_{4}
- Caesium peroxide – Cs_{2}O_{2}
- Caesium sulfate – Cs_{2}SO_{4}
- Caesium superoxide – CsO_{2}
- Caesium triiodide – CsI_{3}

=== Cf ===
- Californium(III) bromide – CfBr_{3}
- Californium(III) carbonate – Cf_{2}(CO_{3})_{3}
- Californium(III) chloride – CfCl_{3}
- Californium(III) fluoride – CfF_{3}
- Californium(III) iodide – CfI_{3}
- Californium(II) iodide – CfI_{2}
- Californium(III) nitrate – Cf(NO_{3})_{3}
- Californium(III) oxide – Cf_{2}O_{3}
- Californium(III) phosphate – CfPO_{4}
- Californium(III) sulfate – Cf_{2}(SO_{4})_{3}
- Californium(III) sulfide – Cf_{2}S_{3}
- Californium oxyfluoride – CfOF
- Californium oxychloride – CfOCl

=== Ca ===
- Calcium bromide – CaBr_{2}
- Calcium carbide – CaC_{2}
- Calcium carbonate (Precipitated Chalk) – CaCO_{3}
- Calcium chlorate – Ca(ClO_{3})_{2}
- Calcium chloride – CaCl_{2}
- Calcium chromate – CaCrO_{4}
- Calcium cyanamide – CaCN_{2}
- Calcium fluoride – CaF_{2}
- Calcium hydride – CaH_{2}
- Calcium hydroxide – Ca(OH)_{2}
- Calcium monosilicide – CaSi
- Calcium oxalate – CaC_{2}O_{4}
- Calcium hydroxychloride – CaOCl_{2}
- Calcium perchlorate – Ca(ClO_{4})_{2}
- Calcium permanganate – Ca(MnO_{4})_{2}
- Calcium sulfate (gypsum) – CaSO_{4}
- Calcium thiocyanate C_{2}CaN_{2}S_{2}

=== C ===
- Carbon dioxide – CO_{2}
- Carbon disulfide – CS_{2}
- Carbon monoxide – CO
- Carbon tetrabromide – CBr_{4}
- Carbon tetrachloride – CCl_{4}
- Carbon tetrafluoride – CF_{4}
- Carbon tetraiodide – CI_{4}
- Carbonic acid – H_{2}CO_{3}
- Carbonyl chloride – COCl_{2}
- Carbonyl fluoride – COF_{2}
- Carbonyl sulfide – COS
- Carboplatin – C_{6}H_{12}N_{2}O_{4}Pt

=== Ce ===
- Cerium(III) bromide – CeBr_{3}
- Cerium(III) carbonate – Ce_{2}(CO_{3})_{3}
- Cerium(III) chloride – CeCl_{3}
- Cerium(III) fluoride – CeF_{3}
- Cerium(III) hydroxide – Ce(OH)_{3}
- Cerium(III) iodide – CeI_{3}
- Cerium(III) nitrate – Ce(NO_{3})_{3}
- Cerium(III) oxide – Ce_{2}O_{3}
- Cerium(III) sulfate – Ce_{2}(SO_{4})_{3}
- Cerium(III) sulfide – Ce_{2}S_{3}
- Cerium(IV) hydroxide – Ce(OH)_{4}
- Cerium(IV) nitrate – Ce(NO_{3})_{4}
- Cerium(IV) oxide – CeO_{2}
- Cerium(IV) sulfate – Ce(SO_{4})_{2}
- Cerium(III,IV) oxide – Ce_{3}O_{4}
- Ceric ammonium nitrate – (NH_{4})_{2}Ce(NO_{3})_{6}
- Cerium hexaboride – CeB_{6}
- Cerium aluminium – CeAl
- Cerium cadmium – CeCd
- Cerium magnesium – CeMg
- Cerium mercury – CeHg
- Cerium silver – CeAg
- Cerium thallium – CeTl
- Cerium zinc – CeZn

=== Cl ===
- Actinium(III) chloride – AcCl_{3}
- Aluminium chloride – AlCl_{3}
- Americium(III) chloride – AmCl_{3}
- Ammonium chloride – [NH_{4}]Cl
- Antimony(III) chloride – SbCl_{3}
- Antimony(V) chloride – SbCl_{5}
- Arsenic(III) chloride – AsCl_{3}
- Barium chloride – BaCl_{2}
- Beryllium chloride – BeCl_{2}
- Bismuth(III) chloride – BiCl_{3}
- Boron trichloride – BCl_{3}
- Bromine monochloride – BrCl
- Cadmium chloride – CdCl_{2}
- Caesium chloride – CsCl
- Calcium chloride – CaCl_{2}
- Calcium hypochlorite – Ca(ClO)_{2}
- Carbon tetrachloride – CCl_{4}
- Cerium(III) chloride – CeCl_{3}
- Chloramine – NH_{2}Cl
- Chloric acid – HClO_{3}
- Chlorine azide – ClN_{3}
- Chlorine dioxide – ClO_{2}
- Chlorine dioxide – ClO_{2}
- Chlorine monofluoride – ClF
- Chlorine monoxide – ClO
- Chlorine pentafluoride – ClF_{5}
- Chlorine perchlorate – Cl_{2}O_{4}
- Chlorine tetroxide – O_{3}ClOOClO_{3}
- Chlorine trifluoride – ClF_{3}
- Chlorine trifluoride – ClF_{3}
- Chlorine trioxide – ClO_{3}
- Chlorine trioxide – ClO_{3}
- Chloroplatinic acid – H_{2}[PtCl_{6}]
- Chlorosulfonic acid – ClSO_{3}H
- Chlorosulfonyl isocyanate – ClSO_{2}NCO
- Chloryl fluoride – ClO_{2}F
- Chromium(II) chloride – CrCl_{2}
- Chromium(III) chloride – CrCl_{3}
- Chromyl chloride – CrO_{2}Cl_{2}
- Cisplatin (cis–platinum(II) chloride diamine) – [PtCl_{2}(NH_{3})_{2}]
- Cobalt(II) chloride – CoCl_{2}
- Copper(I) chloride – CuCl
- Copper(II) chloride – CuCl_{2}
- Curium(III) chloride – CmCl_{3}
- Cyanogen chloride – ClCN
- Dichlorine dioxide – Cl_{2}O_{2}
- Dichlorine heptaoxide – Cl_{2}O_{7}
- Dichlorine heptoxide – Cl_{2}O_{7}
- Dichlorine hexoxide – Cl_{2}O_{6}
- Dichlorine monoxide – Cl_{2}O
- Dichlorine monoxide – Cl_{2}O
- Dichlorine tetroxide (chlorine perchlorate) – ClOClO_{3}
- Dichlorine trioxide – Cl_{2}O_{3}
- Dichlorosilane – SiH_{2}Cl_{2}
- Disulfur dichloride – S_{2}Cl_{2}
- Dysprosium(III) chloride – DyCl_{3}
- Erbium(III) chloride – ErCl_{3}
- Europium(II) chloride – EuCl_{2}
- Europium(III) chloride – EuCl_{3}
- Gadolinium(III) chloride – GdCl_{3}
- Gallium trichloride – GaCl_{3}
- Germanium dichloride – GeCl_{2}
- Germanium tetrachloride – GeCl_{4}
- Gold(I) chloride – AuCl
- Gold(III) chloride – AuCl_{3}
- Hafnium(IV) chloride – HfCl_{4}
- Holmium(III) chloride – HoCl_{3}
- Hydrochloric acid – HCl(aq)
- Hydrogen chloride – HCl
- Hypochlorous acid – HOCl
- Indium(I) chloride – InCl
- Indium(III) chloride – InCl_{3}
- Iodine monochloride – ICl
- Iridium(III) chloride – IrCl_{3}
- Iron(II) chloride – FeCl_{2}
- Iron(III) chloride – FeCl_{3}
- Lanthanum chloride – LaCl_{3}
- Lead(II) chloride – PbCl_{2}
- Lithium chloride – LiCl
- Lithium perchlorate – LiClO_{4}
- Lutetium chloride – LuCl_{3}
- Magnesium chloride – MgCl_{2}
- Magnesium perchlorate – Mg(ClO_{4})_{2}
- Manganese(II) chloride – MnCl_{2}
- Mercury(I) chloride – Hg_{2}Cl_{2}
- Mercury(II) chloride – HgCl_{2}
- Mercury(II) perchlorate – Hg(ClO_{4})_{2}
- Molybdenum(III) chloride – MoCl_{3}
- Molybdenum(V) chloride – MoCl_{5}
- Neodymium(III) chloride – NdCl_{3}
- Neptunium(IV) chloride – NpCl_{4}
- Nickel(II) chloride – NiCl_{2}
- Niobium oxide trichloride – NbOCl_{3}
- Niobium(IV) chloride – NbCl_{4}
- Niobium(V) chloride – NbCl_{5}
- Nitrogen trichloride – NCl_{3}
- Nitrosyl chloride – NOCl
- Nitryl chloride – NO_{2}Cl
- Osmium(III) chloride – OsCl_{3}
- Palladium(II) chloride – PdCl_{2}
- Perchloric acid – HClO_{4}
- Perchloryl fluoride – ClO_{3}F
- Phosgene – COCl_{2}
- Phosphonitrilic chloride trimer – (PNCl)_{3}
- Phosphorus oxychloride – POCl_{3}
- Phosphorus pentachloride – PCl_{5}
- Phosphorus trichloride – PCl_{3}
- Platinum(II) chloride – PtCl_{2}
- Platinum(IV) chloride – PtCl_{4}
- Plutonium(III) chloride – PuCl_{3}
- Potassium chlorate – KClO_{3}
- Potassium chloride – KCl
- Potassium perchlorate – KClO_{4}
- Praseodymium(III) chloride – PrCl_{3}
- Protactinium(V) chloride – PaCl_{5}
- Radium chloride – RaCl_{2}
- Rhenium(III) chloride – ReCl_{3}
- Rhenium(V) chloride – ReCl_{5}
- Rhodium(III) chloride – RhCl_{3}
- Rubidium chloride – RbCl
- Ruthenium(III) chloride – RuCl_{3}
- Samarium(III) chloride – SmCl_{3}
- Scandium chloride – ScCl_{3}
- Selenium dichloride – SeCl_{2}
- Selenium tetrachloride – SeCl_{4}
- Silicon tetrachloride – SiCl_{4}
- Silver chloride – AgCl
- Silver perchlorate – AgClO_{4}
- Sodium chlorate – NaClO_{3}
- Sodium chloride (table salt, rock salt) – NaCl
- Sodium chlorite – NaClO_{2}
- Sodium hypochlorite – NaOCl
- Sodium perchlorate – NaClO_{4}
- Strontium chloride – SrCl_{2}
- Sulfur dichloride – SCl_{2}
- Sulfuryl chloride – SO_{2}Cl_{2}
- Tantalum(III) chloride – TaCl_{3}
- Tantalum(IV) chloride – TaCl_{4}
- Tantalum(V) chloride – TaCl_{5}
- Tellurium tetrachloride – TeCl_{4}
- Terbium(III) chloride – TbCl_{3}
- Tetrachloroauric acid – H[AuCl_{4}]
- Thallium(I) chloride – TlCl
- Thallium(III) chloride – TlCl_{3}
- Thionyl chloride – SOCl_{2}
- Thiophosgene – CSCl_{2}
- Thorium(IV) chloride – ThCl_{4}
- Thulium(III) chloride – TmCl_{3}
- Tin(II) chloride – SnCl_{2}
- Tin(IV) chloride – SnCl_{4}
- Titanium tetrachloride – TiCl_{4}
- Titanium(III) chloride – TiCl_{3}
- Trichlorosilane – HSiCl_{3}
- Trigonal bipyramidal – CdCl_{5}
- Tungsten(IV) chloride – WCl_{4}
- Tungsten(V) chloride – WCl_{5}
- Tungsten(VI) chloride – WCl_{6}
- Uranium hexachloride – UCl_{6}
- Uranium(III) chloride – UCl_{3}
- Uranium(IV) chloride – UCl_{4}
- Uranium(V) chloride – UCl_{5}
- Uranyl chloride – UO_{2}Cl_{2}
- Vanadium oxytrichloride – VOCl_{3}
- Vanadium(II) chloride – VCl_{2}
- Vanadium(III) chloride – VCl_{3}
- Vanadium(IV) chloride – VCl_{4}
- Ytterbium(III) chloride – YbCl_{3}
- Yttrium chloride – YCl_{3}
- Zinc chloride – ZnCl_{2}
- Zirconium(IV) chloride – ZrCl_{4}

=== Cr ===
- Chromic acid – H_{2}CrO_{4}
- Chromium trioxide (Chromic acid) – CrO_{3}
- Chromium(II) chloride (chromous chloride) – CrCl_{2}
- Chromium(II) sulfate – CrSO_{4}
- Chromium(III) chloride – CrCl_{3}
- Chromium(III) nitrate – Cr(NO_{3})_{3}
- Chromium(III) oxide – Cr_{2}O_{3}
- Chromium(III) sulfate – Cr_{2}(SO_{4})_{3}
- Chromium(III) telluride – Cr_{2}Te_{3}
- Chromium(IV) oxide – CrO_{2}
- Chromium pentafluoride – CrF_{5}
- Chromium sulfide bromide – CrSBr
- Chromyl chloride – CrO_{2}Cl_{2}
- Chromyl fluoride – CrO_{2}F_{2}

=== Co ===
- Cobalt(II) acetate – Co(CH_{3}CO_{2})_{2}
- Cobalt(II) bromide – CoBr_{2}
- Cobalt(II) carbonate – CoCO_{3}
- Cobalt(II) chloride – CoCl_{2}
- Cobalt(II) fluoride – CoF_{2}
- Cobalt(II) hydroxide – Co(OH)_{2}
- Cobalt(II) iodide – CoI_{2}
- Cobalt(II) nitrate – Co(NO_{3})_{2}
- Cobalt(II) oxide – CoO
- Cobalt(II) perchlorate – Co(ClO_{4})_{2}
- Cobalt(II) phosphate – Co_{3}(PO_{4})_{2}
- Cobalt(II) sulfate – CoSO_{4}
- Cobalt(II) thiocyanate – Co(SCN)_{2}
- Cobalt(II,III) oxide – Co_{3}O_{4}
- Cobalt(III) chloride – CoCl_{3}
- Cobalt(III) fluoride – CoF_{3}
- Cobalt(III) hydroxide – Co(OH)_{3}
- Cobalt(III) nitrate – Co(NO_{3})_{3}
- Cobalt(III) oxide – Co_{2}O_{3}

=== Cu ===
- Copper(I) acetylide – Cu_{2}C_{2}
- Copper(I) azide – CuN_{3}
- Copper(I) bromide – CuBr
- Copper(I) chloride – CuCl
- Copper(I) fluoride – CuF
- Copper(I) hydroxide – CuOH
- Copper(I) iodide – CuI
- Copper(I) nitrate – CuNO_{3}
- Copper(I) oxide – Cu_{2}O
- Copper(I) phosphide – Cu_{3}P
- Copper(I) selenide – Cu_{2}Se
- Copper(I) sulfate – CuSO_{4}
- Copper(I) sulfide – Cu_{2}S
- Copper(I) telluride – Cu_{2}Te
- Copper(I) thiocyanate – CuSCN
- Copper(I,II) sulfite – Cu_{3}(SO_{3})_{2}
- Copper(II) arsenate – Cu_{3}(AsO_{4})_{2}
- Copper(II) azide – Cu(N_{3})_{2}
- Copper(II) borate – Cu_{3}(BO_{3})_{2}
- Copper(II) bromide – CuBr_{2}
- Copper(II) carbonate – CuCO_{3}
- Copper(II) carbonate hydroxide – Cu_{2}(CO_{3})(OH)_{2}
- Copper(II) chlorate – Cu(ClO_{3})_{2}
- Copper(II) chloride – CuCl_{2}
- Copper(II) fluoride – CuF_{2}
- Copper(II) hydroxide – Cu(OH)_{2}
- Copper(II) nitrate – Cu(NO_{3})_{2}
- Copper(II) oxide – CuO
- Copper(II) perchlorate – Cu(ClO_{4})_{2}
- Copper(II) phosphate – Cu_{3}(PO_{4})_{2}
- Copper(II) selenide – CuSe
- Copper(II) selenite – CuSeO_{3}
- Copper(II) sulfate – CuSO_{4}
- Copper(II) sulfide – CuS
- Copper(II) telluride – CuTe
- Copper(II) thiocyanate – Cu(SCN)_{2}
- Copper oxychloride – H_{3}ClCu_{2}O_{3}
- Tetramminecopper(II) sulfate – [Cu(NH_{3})_{4}]SO_{4}

=== Cm ===
- Curium(III) chloride – CmCl_{3}
- Curium(III) oxide – Cm_{2}O_{3}
- Curium(IV) oxide – CmO_{2}
- Curium hydroxide – Cm(OH)_{3}

=== CN ===
- Cyanogen bromide – BrCN
- Cyanogen chloride – ClCN
- Cyanogen iodide – ICN
- Cyanogen – (CN)_{2}
- Cyanuric chloride – C_{3}Cl_{3}N_{3}
- Cyanogen thiocyanate – CNSCN
- Cyanogen selenocyanate – CNSeCN
- Cyanogen azide – N_{3}CN

== D ==
=== Dy ===
- Dysprosium(II) chloride – DyCl_{2}
- Dysprosium(II) iodide – DyI_{2}
- Dysprosium(III) acetate – Dy(CH_{3}COO)_{3}
- Dysprosium(III) bromide – DyBr_{3}
- Dysprosium(III) carbonate – Dy_{2}(CO_{3})_{3}
- Dysprosium(III) chloride – DyCl_{3}
- Dysprosium(III) fluoride – DyF_{3}
- Dysprosium(III) iodide – DyI_{3}
- Dysprosium(III) nitrate – Dy(NO_{3})_{3}
- Dysprosium(III) oxalate – Dy_{2}(C_{2}O_{4})_{3}
- Dysprosium(III) oxide – Dy_{2}O_{3}
- Dysprosium(III) phosphate – DyPO_{4}
- Dysprosium(III) selenide – Dy_{2}Se_{3}
- Dysprosium(III) sulfide – Dy_{2}S_{3}
- Dysprosium(III) sulfate – Dy_{2}(SO_{4})_{3}
- Dysprosium(III) telluride – Dy_{2}Te_{3}
- Dysprosium arsenide – DyAs
- Dysprosium bismuthide – DyBi
- Dysprosium iodate – Dy(IO_{3})_{3}
- Dysprosium monosulfide – DyS
- Dysprosium nitride – DyN
- Dysprosium phosphide – DyP
- Dysprosium stannate – Dy_{2}Sn_{2}O_{7}
- Dysprosium titanate – Dy_{2}Ti_{2}O_{7}

== E ==
=== Es ===
- Einsteinium(III) bromide – EsBr_{3}
- Einsteinium(III) carbonate – Es_{2}(CO_{3})_{3}
- Einsteinium(III) chloride – EsCl_{3}
- Einsteinium(III) fluoride – EsF_{3}
- Einsteinium(III) iodide – EsI_{3}
- Einsteinium(III) nitrate – Es(NO_{3})_{3}
- Einsteinium(III) oxide – Es_{2}O_{3}
- Einsteinium(III) phosphate – EsPO_{4}
- Einsteinium(III) sulfate – Es_{2}(SO_{4})_{3}
- Einsteinium(III) sulfide – Es_{2}S_{3}

=== Er ===
- Erbium-copper – ErCu
- Erbium-gold – ErAu
- Erbium-iridium – ErIr
- Erbium-silver – ErAg
- Erbium hexaboride – ErB_{6}
- Erbium iodate – Er(IO_{3})_{3}
- Erbium nitride – ErN
- Erbium oxybromide – ErOBr
- Erbium oxychloride – ErOCl
- Erbium oxyfluoride – ErOF
- Erbium phosphide – ErP
- Erbium silicide – ErSi_{2}
- Erbium tetraboride – ErB_{4}
- Erbium(III) bromide – ErBr_{3}
- Erbium(III) chloride – ErCl_{3}
- Erbium(III) fluoride – ErF_{3}
- Erbium(III) hydroxide – Er(OH)_{3}
- Erbium(III) iodide – ErI_{3}
- Erbium(III) nitrate – Er(NO_{3})_{3}
- Erbium(III) oxide – Er_{2}O_{3}
- Erbium(III) selenate – Er_{2}(SeO_{4})_{3}
- Erbium(III) selenide – Er_{2}Se_{3}
- Erbium(III) sulfate – Er_{2}(SO_{4})_{3}
- Erbium(III) telluride – Er_{2}Te_{3}

=== Eu ===
- Europium(II) bromide – EuBr_{2}
- Europium(II) chloride – EuCl_{2}
- Europium(II) fluoride – EuF_{2}
- Europium(II) hydride – EuH_{2}
- Europium(II) hydroxide – Eu(OH)_{2}
- Europium(II) oxide – EuO
- Europium(II) iodide – EuI_{2}
- Europium(II) selenide – EuSe
- Europium(II) silicide – EuSi_{2}
- Europium(II) sulfate – EuSO_{4}
- Europium(II) sulfide – EuS_{2}
- Europium(II) telluride – EuTe
- Europium(II) titanate – EuTiO_{3}
- Europium(III) acetate – Eu(CH_{3}COO)_{3}
- Europium(III) arsenate – EuAsO_{4}
- Europium(III) bromide – EuBr_{3}
- Europium(III) carbonate – Eu(CO_{3})_{3}
- Europium(III) chloride – EuCl_{3}
- Europium(III) chromate – EuCrO_{4}
- Europium(III) fluoride – EuF_{3}
- Europium(III) hydroxide – Eu(OH)_{3}
- Europium(III) iodate – Eu(IO_{3})_{3}
- Europium(III) iodide – EuI_{3}
- Europium(III) nitrate – Eu(NO_{3})_{3}
- Europium(III) oxide – Eu_{2}O_{3}
- Europium(III) perchlorate – Eu(ClO_{4})_{3}
- Europium(III) phosphate – EuPO_{4}
- Europium(III) phosphide – EuP
- Europium(III) selenide – Eu_{2}Se_{3}
- Europium(III) sulfate – Eu_{2}(SO_{4})_{3}
- Europium(III) telluride – Eu_{2}Te_{3}
- Europium(III) vanadate – EuVO_{4}
- Europium barium titanate – BaEuTiO_{4}

== F ==
=== F ===
- Fluoroantimonic acid – H_{2}FSbF_{6}
- Tetrafluorohydrazine – N_{2}F_{4}
- Trifluoromethylisocyanide – C_{2}NF_{3}
- Trifluoromethanesulfonic acid – CF_{3}SO_{3}H
- Other fluorides: AlF_{3}, AmF_{3}, NH_{4}F, NH_{4}HF_{2}, NH_{4}BF_{4}, SbF_{5}, SbF_{3}, AsF_{5}, AsF_{3}, BaF_{2}, BeF_{2}, BiF_{3}, F_{5}SOOSF_{5}, BF_{3}, BrF_{5}, BrF_{3}, BrF, CdF_{2}, CsF, CaF_{2}, CF_{4}, COF_{2}, CeF_{3}, CeF_{4}, ClF_{5}, ClF_{3}, ClF, CrF_{3}, CrF_{5}, CrO_{2}F_{2}, CoF_{2}, CoF_{3}, CuF, CuF_{2}, CmF_{3}, N_{2}F_{2}, N_{2}F_{4}, O_{2}F_{2}, P_{2}F_{4}, S_{2}F_{2}, DyF_{3}, ErF_{3}, EuF_{3}, HBF_{4}, FN_{3}, FOSO_{2}F, FNO_{3}, FSO_{3}H, GdF_{3}, GaF_{3}, GeF_{4}, AuF_{3}, HfF_{4}, H_{2}SbF_{6}, HPF_{6}, H_{2}SiF_{6}, H_{2}TiF_{6}, HF, HF(aq), HFO, InF_{3}, IF_{7}, IF, IF_{5}, IrF_{3}, IrF_{6}, FeF_{2}, FeF_{3}, KrF_{2}, LaF_{3}, PbF_{2}, PbF_{4}, LiF, MgF_{2}, MnF_{2}, MnF_{3}, MnF_{4}, Hg_{2}F_{2}, HgF_{2}, MoF_{3}, MoF_{5}, MoF_{6}, NbF_{4}, NbF_{5}, NdF_{3}, NiF_{2}, NpF_{4}, NpF_{5}, NpF_{6}, ONF_{3}, NF_{3}, NO_{2}BF_{4}, NOBF_{4}, NOF, NO_{2}F, OsF_{4}, OsF_{6}, OsF_{7}, OF_{2}, PdF_{2}, PdF_{4}, FSO_{2}OOSO_{2}F, FPS, POF_{3}, PF_{5}, PF_{3}, PtF_{2}, PtF_{4}, PtF_{6}, PuF_{3}, PuF_{4}, PuF_{6}, KF, KPF_{6}, KBF_{4}, PrF_{3}, PaF_{5}, RaF_{2}, RnF_{2}, ReF_{4}, ReF_{6}, ReF_{7}, RhF_{3}, RbF, RuF_{3}, RuF_{4}, RuF_{6}, SmF_{3}, ScF_{3}, SeF_{6}, SeF_{4}, SiF_{4}, AgF, AgF_{2}, AgBF_{4}, NaF, NaFSO_{3}, Na_{3}AlF_{6}, NaSbF_{6}, NaPF_{6}, Na_{2}SiF_{6}, Na_{2}TiF_{6}, NaBF_{4}, SrF_{2}, SF_{2}, SF_{6}, SF_{4}, SO_{2}F_{2}, TaF_{5}, TcF_{6}, TeF_{6}, TeF_{4}, TlF, TlF_{3}, SOF_{2}, ThF_{4}, SnF_{2}, SnF_{4}, TiF_{3}, TiF_{4}, HSiF_{3}, WF_{6}, UF_{4}, UF_{5}, UF_{6}, UO_{2}F_{2}, VF_{3}, VF_{4}, VF_{5}, XeF_{2}, XeO_{2}F_{2}, XeF_{6}, XePtF_{6}, XeF_{4}, YbF_{3}, YF_{3}, ZnF_{2}, ZrF_{4}

=== Fr ===
- Francium oxide – Fr_{2}O
- Francium chloride – FrCl
- Francium bromide – FrBr
- Francium iodide – FrI
- Francium carbonate – Fr_{2}CO_{3}
- Francium hydroxide – FrOH
- Francium sulfate – Fr_{2}SO_{4}

== G ==
=== Gd ===
- Gadolinium(III) chloride – GdCl_{3}
- Gadolinium(III) oxide – Gd_{2}O_{3}
- Gadolinium(III) carbonate – Gd_{2}(CO_{3})_{3}
- Gadolinium(III) chloride – GdCl_{3}
- Gadolinium(III) fluoride – GdF_{3}
- Gadolinium gallium garnet – Gd_{3}Ga_{5}O_{12}
- Gadolinium(III) nitrate – Gd(NO_{3})_{3}
- Gadolinium(III) oxide – Gd_{2}O_{3}
- Gadolinium(III) phosphate – GdPO_{4}
- Gadolinium(III) sulfate – Gd_{2}(SO_{4})_{3}

=== Ga ===
- Gallium antimonide – GaSb
- Gallium arsenide – GaAs
- Gallium(III) fluoride – GaF_{3}
- Gallium trichloride – GaCl_{3}
- Gallium nitride – GaN
- Gallium phosphide – GaP
- Gallium(II) sulfide – GaS
- Gallium(III) sulfide – Ga_{2}S_{3}

=== Ge ===
- Digermane – Ge_{2}H_{6}
- Germane – GeH_{4}
- Germanium(II) bromide – GeBr_{2}
- Germanium(II) chloride – GeCl_{2}
- Germanium(II) fluoride – GeF_{2}
- Germanium(II) iodide – GeI_{2}
- Germanium(II) oxide – GeO
- Germanium(II) selenide – GeSe
- Germanium(II) sulfide – GeS
- Germanium(IV) bromide – GeBr_{4}
- Germanium(IV) chloride – GeCl_{4}
- Germanium(IV) fluoride – GeF_{4}
- Germanium(IV) iodide – GeI_{4}
- Germanium(IV) nitride – Ge_{3}N_{4}
- Germanium(IV) oxide – GeO_{2}
- Germanium(IV) selenide – GeSe_{2}
- Germanium(IV) sulfide – GeS_{2}
- Germanium difluoride – GeF_{2}
- Germanium dioxide – GeO_{2}
- Germanium tetrachloride – GeCl_{4}
- Germanium tetrafluoride – GeF_{4}
- Germanium telluride – GeTe

=== Au ===
- Gold(I) bromide – AuBr
- Gold(I) chloride – AuCl
- Gold(I) cyanide – AuCN
- Gold(I) hydride – AuH
- Gold(I) iodide – AuI
- Gold(I) selenide – Au_{2}Se
- Gold(I) sulfide – Au_{2}S
- Gold(III) bromide – (AuBr_{3})_{2}
- Gold(III) chloride – (AuCl_{3})_{2}
- Gold(III) fluoride – AuF_{3}
- Gold(III) iodide – AuI_{3}
- Gold(III) oxide – Au_{2}O_{3}
- Gold(III) selenide – Au_{2}Se_{3}
- Gold(III) sulfide – Au_{2}S_{3}
- Gold(III) nitrate – Au(NO_{3})_{3}
- Gold(V) fluoride – AuF_{5}
- Gold(I,III) chloride – Au_{4}Cl_{8}
- Gold ditelluride – AuTe_{2}
- Gold heptafluoride – AuF_{5}·F_{2} (AuF_{7})

== H ==
=== Hf ===
- Hafnium(IV) bromide – HfBr_{4}
- Hafnium(IV) carbide – HfC
- Hafnium(IV) chloride – HfCl_{4}
- Hafnium(IV) fluoride – HfF_{4}
- Hafnium(IV) iodide – HfI_{4}
- Hafnium(IV) oxide – HfO_{2}
- Hafnium(IV) silicate – HfSiO_{4}
- Hafnium(IV) sulfide – HfS_{2}
- Hexadecacarbonylhexarhodium – Rh_{6}(CO)_{16}

=== Hs ===
- Hassium tetroxide – HsO_{4}

=== Ho ===
- Holmium antimonide – HoSb
- Holmium arsenide – HoAs
- Holmium bismuthide – HoBi
- Holmium diantimonide – HoSb_{2}
- Holmium disilicide – HoSi_{2}
- Holmium iodate – Ho(IO_{3})_{3}
- Holmium monosulfide – HoS
- Holmium nitride – HoN
- Holmium oxychloride – HoOCl
- Holmium oxyfluoride – HoOF
- Holmium phosphide – HoP
- Holmium titanate – Ho_{2}Ti_{2}O_{7}
- Holmium(III) acetate – Ho(CH_{3}COO_{3})_{3}
- Holmium(III) acetylacetonate – Ho(acac)_{3}
- Holmium(III) bromide – HoBr_{3}
- Holmium(III) carbonate – Ho_{2}(CO_{3})_{3}
- Holmium(III) chloride – HoCl_{3}
- Holmium(III) fluoride – HoF_{3}
- Holmium(III) hydroxide – Ho(OH)_{3}
- Holmium(III) iodide – HoI_{3}
- Holmium(III) nitrate – Ho(NO_{3})_{3}
- Holmium(III) oxalate – Ho_{2}(C_{2}O_{4})_{3}
- Holmium(III) oxide – Ho_{2}O_{3}
- Holmium(III) phosphate – HoPO_{4}
- Holmium(III) selenide – Ho_{2}Se_{3}
- Holmium(III) sulfate – Ho_{2}(SO_{4})_{3}
- Holmium(III) sulfide – Ho_{2}S_{3}
- Holmium(III) telluride – Ho_{2}Te_{3}

=== H ===
- Hexafluorosilicic acid – H_{2}F_{6}Si
- Hydrazine – N_{2}H_{4}
- Hydrazoic acid – HN_{3}
- Hydroiodic acid – HI
- Hydrogen bromide – HBr
- Hydrogen chloride – HCl
- Hydrogen cyanide – HCN
- Hydrogen fluoride – HF
- Hydrogen peroxide – H_{2}O_{2}
- Hydrogen selenide – H_{2}Se
- Hydrogen sulfide – H_{2}S
- Hydrogen telluride – H_{2}Te
- Hydroxylamine – NH_{2}OH
- Hypobromous acid – HBrO
- Hypochlorous acid – HClO
- Hypophosphorous acid – H_{3}PO_{2}
- Metaphosphoric acid – HPO_{3}
- Protonated molecular hydrogen – H_{3}^{+}
- Trioxidane – H_{2}O_{3}
- Water - H_{2}O

=== He ===
- Sodium helide – Na_{2}He

== I ==
=== In ===
- Indium(I) bromide – InBr
- Indium(I) iodide – InI
- Indium(I) oxide – In_{2}O
- Indium(III) bromide – InBr_{3}
- Indium(III) chloride – InCl_{3}
- Indium(III) fluoride – InF_{3}
- Indium(III) nitrate – In(NO_{3})_{3}
- Indium(III) oxide – In_{2}O_{3}
- Indium(III) selenide – In_{2}Se_{3}
- Indium(III) sulfate – In_{2}(SO_{4})_{3}
- Indium(III) sulfide – In_{2}S_{3}
- Indium antimonide – InSb
- Indium arsenide – InAs
- Indium nitride – InN
- Indium phosphide – InP
- Trimethylindium – In(CH_{3})_{3}

=== I ===
- Iodic acid – HIO_{3}
- Iodine heptafluoride – IF_{7}
- Iodine pentafluoride – IF_{5}
- Iodine monochloride – ICl
- Iodine trichloride – ICl_{3}
- Iodine pentachloride - ICl_{5}
- Iodine tribromide - IBr_{3}
- Periodic acid – HIO_{4}
- Tetrachloroiodic acid - HICl_{4}

=== Ir ===
- Iridium(IV) chloride – IrCl_{4}
- Iridium(V) fluoride – IrF_{5}
- Iridium hexafluoride – IrF_{6}
- Iridium tetrafluoride – IrF_{4}

=== Fe ===
- Columbite – Fe^{2+}Nb_{2}O_{6}
- Iron(II) chloride – FeCl_{2}
- Iron(II) oxalate – FeC_{2}O_{4}
- Iron(II) oxide – FeO
- Iron(II) selenate – FeSeO_{4}
- Iron(II) sulfate – FeSO_{4}
- Iron(III) chloride – FeCl_{3}
- Iron(III) fluoride – FeF_{3}
- Iron(III) oxalate – C_{6}Fe_{2}O_{12}
- Iron(III) oxide – Fe_{2}O_{3}
- Iron(III) nitrate – Fe(NO_{3})_{3}(H_{2}O)_{9}
- Iron(III) sulfate – Fe_{2}(SO_{4})_{3}
- Iron(III) thiocyanate – Fe(SCN)_{3}
- Iron(II,III) oxide – Fe_{3}O_{4}
- Iron ferrocyanide – Fe_{7}(CN)_{18}
- Prussian blue (Iron(III) hexacyanoferrate(II)) – Fe_{4}[Fe(CN)_{6}]_{3}
- Ammonium iron(II) sulfate – (NH_{4})_{2}Fe(SO_{4})_{2}
- Iron(II) bromide – FeBr_{2}
- Iron(III) bromide – FeBr_{3}
- Iron(II) chloride – FeCl_{2}
- Iron(III) chloride – FeCl_{3}
- Iron disulfide – FeS_{2}
- Iron dodecacarbonyl – Fe_{3}(CO)_{12}
- Iron(III) fluoride – FeF_{3}
- Iron(II) iodide – FeI_{2}
- Iron naphthenate – Fe(ONap)_{3}
- Iron(III) nitrate – Fe(NO_{3})_{3}
- Iron nonacarbonyl – Fe_{2}(CO)_{9}
- Iron(II) oxalate – FeC_{2}O_{4}
- Iron(II,III) oxide – Fe_{3}O_{4}
- Iron(III) oxide – Fe_{2}O_{3}
- Iron pentacarbonyl – Fe(CO)_{5}
- Iron(III) perchlorate – Fe(ClO_{4})_{3}
- Iron(III) phosphate – FePO_{4}
- Iron(II) sulfamate – (NH_{2}SO_{3})_{2}Fe
- Iron(II) sulfate – FeSO_{4}
- Iron(III) sulfate – Fe_{2}(SO_{4})_{3}
- Iron(II) sulfide – FeS

== K ==
=== Kr ===
- Krypton difluoride – KrF_{2}

== L ==
=== La ===
- Lanthanum aluminium – LaAl
- Lanthanum cadmium – LaCd
- Lanthanum carbonate – La_{2}(CO_{3})_{3}
- Lanthanum magnesium – LaMg
- Lanthanum manganite – LaMnO_{3}
- Lanthanum mercury – LaHg
- Lanthanum silver – LaAg
- Lanthanum thallium – LaTl
- Lanthanum zinc – LaZn
- Lanthanum boride – LaB_{6}
- Lanthanum carbonate – La_{2}(CO_{3})_{3}
- Lanthanum(III) chloride – LaCl_{3}
- Lanthanum trifluoride – LaF_{3}
- Lanthanum(III) oxide – La_{2}O_{3}
- Lanthanum(III) nitrate – La(NO_{3})_{3}
- Lanthanum(III) phosphate – LaPO_{4}
- Lanthanum(III) sulfate – La_{2}(SO_{4})_{3}

=== Pb ===
- Lead(II) azide – Pb(N_{3})_{2}
- Lead(II) bromide – PbBr_{2}
- Lead(II) carbonate – Pb(CO_{3})
- Lead(II) chloride – PbCl_{2}
- Lead(II) fluoride – PbF_{2}
- Lead(II) hydroxide – Pb(OH)_{2}
- Lead(II) iodide – PbI_{2}
- Lead(II) nitrate – Pb(NO_{3})_{2}
- Lead(II) oxide – PbO
- Lead(II) phosphate – Pb_{3}(PO_{4})_{2}
- Lead(II) sulfate – Pb(SO_{4})
- Lead(II) selenide – PbSe
- Lead(II) sulfide – PbS
- Lead(II) telluride – PbTe
- Lead(II) thiocyanate – Pb(CNS)_{2}
- Lead(II,IV) oxide – Pb_{3}O_{4}
- Lead(IV) oxide – PbO_{2}
- Lead(IV) sulfide – PbS_{2}
- Lead hydrogen arsenate – PbHAsO_{4}
- Lead styphnate – C_{6}HN_{3}O_{8}Pb
- Lead tetrachloride – PbCl_{4}
- Lead tetrafluoride – PbF_{4}
- Lead tetroxide – Pb_{3}O_{4}
- Lead titanate – PbTiO_{3}
- Lead zirconate titanate – Pb[Ti_{x}Zr_{1−x}]O_{3} (e.g., x = 0.52 is lead zirconium titanate)
- Plumbane – PbH_{4}

=== Li ===
- Lithium tetrachloroaluminate – LiAlCl_{4}
- Lithium aluminium hydride – LiAlH_{4}
- Lithium bromide – LiBr
- Lithium borohydride – LiBH_{4}
- Lithium carbonate (Lithium salt) – Li_{2}CO_{3}
- Lithium chloride – LiCl
- Lithium hypochlorite – LiClO
- Lithium chlorate – LiClO_{3}
- Lithium perchlorate – LiClO_{4}
- Lithium cobalt oxide – LiCoO_{2}
- Lithium oxide – Li_{2}O
- Lithium peroxide – Li_{2}O_{2}
- Lithium hydride – LiH
- Lithium hydroxide – LiOH
- Lithium hydrosulfide – LiHS
- Lithium hypofluorite – LiOF
- Lithium iodide – LiI
- Lithium iron phosphate – FeLiO_{4}P
- Lithium nitrate – LiNO_{3}
- Lithium sulfide – Li_{2}S
- Lithium sulfite – Li_{2}SO_{3}
- Lithium sulfate – Li_{2}SO_{4}
- Lithium superoxide – LiO_{2}
- Lithium hexafluorophosphate – LiPF_{6}

== M ==
=== Mg ===
- Magnesium antimonide – MgSb
- Magnesium bromide – MgBr_{2}
- Magnesium carbonate – MgCO_{3}
- Magnesium chloride – MgCl_{2}
- Magnesium citrate – C_{6}H_{6}MgO_{7}
- Magnesium oxide – MgO
- Magnesium perchlorate – Mg(ClO_{4})_{2}
- Magnesium phosphate – Mg_{3}(PO_{4})_{2}
- Magnesium sulfate – MgSO_{4}
- Magnesium bicarbonate – Mg(HCO_{3})_{2}
- Magnesium boride – MgB_{6}
- Magnesium bromide – MgBr_{2}
- Magnesium carbide – MgC_{2}
- Magnesium carbonate – MgCO_{3}
- Magnesium chloride – MgCl_{2}
- Magnesium cyanamide – MgCN_{2}
- Magnesium fluoride – MgF_{2}
- Magnesium fluorophosphate – MgPO_{3}F
- Magnesium gluconate – Mg(HOCH_{2}(CHOH)_{4}CO_{2})_{2}
- Magnesium hydride – MgH_{2}
- Dimagnesium phosphate – MgHPO_{4}
- Magnesium hydroxide – Mg(OH)_{2}
- Magnesium hypochlorite – Mg(OCl)_{2}
- Magnesium iodide – MgI_{2}
- Magnesium molybdate – MgMoO_{4}
- Magnesium nitrate – Mg(NO_{3})_{2}
- Magnesium oxalate – MgC_{2}O_{4}
- Magnesium peroxide – MgO_{2}
- Magnesium phosphate – Mg_{3}(PO_{4})_{2}
- Magnesium silicate – MgSiO_{3}
- Magnesium sulfate – MgSO_{4}
- Magnesium sulfide – MgS
- Magnesium titanate – MgTiO_{3}
- Magnesium tungstate – MgWO_{4}
- Magnesium zirconate – MgZrO_{3}

=== Mn ===
- Manganese(II) bromide – MnBr_{2}
- Manganese(II) chloride – MnCl_{2}
- Manganese(II) hydroxide – Mn(OH)_{2}
- Manganese(II) oxide – MnO
- Manganese(II) phosphate – Mn_{3}(PO_{4})_{2}
- Manganese(II) sulfate – MnSO_{4}
- Manganese(II) sulfate monohydrate – MnSO_{4}·H_{2}O
- Manganese(III) chloride – MnCl_{3}
- Manganese(III) oxide – Mn_{2}O_{3}
- Manganese(IV) fluoride – MnF_{4}
- Manganese(IV) oxide (manganese dioxide) – MnO_{2}
- Manganese(II,III) oxide – Mn_{3}O_{4}
- Manganese dioxide – MnO_{2}
- Manganese heptoxide – Mn_{2}O_{7}

=== Hg ===
- Mercury(I) chloride – Hg_{2}Cl_{2}
- Mercury(I) sulfate – Hg_{2}SO_{4}
- Mercury(II) chloride – HgCl_{2}
- Mercury(II) hydride – HgH_{2}
- Mercury(II) selenide – HgSe
- Mercury(II) sulfate – HgSO_{4}
- Mercury(II) sulfide – HgS
- Mercury(II) telluride – HgTe
- Mercury(II) thiocyanate – Hg(SCN)_{2}
- Mercury(IV) fluoride – HgF_{4}
- Mercury fulminate – Hg(ONC)_{2}

=== Mo ===
- Molybdenum(II) bromide – MoBr_{2}
- Molybdenum(II) chloride – Mo_{6}Cl_{12}
- Molybdenum(III) bromide – MoBr_{3}
- Molybdenum(III) chloride – MoCl_{3}
- Molybdenum(IV) carbide – MoC
- Molybdenum(IV) chloride – MoCl_{4}
- Molybdenum(IV) fluoride – MoF_{4}
- Molybdenum(V) chloride – Mo_{2}Cl_{10}
- Molybdenum(V) fluoride – MoF_{5}
- Molybdenum diselenide – MoSe_{2}
- Molybdenum disulfide – MoS_{2}
- Molybdenum hexacarbonyl – Mo(CO)_{6}
- Molybdenum hexafluoride – MoF_{6}
- Molybdenum tetrachloride – MoCl_{4}
- Molybdenum trioxide – MoO_{3}
- Molybdic acid – H_{2}MoO_{4}

== N ==
=== Nd ===
- Neodymium acetate – Nd(CH_{3}COO)_{3}
- Neodymium(III) arsenate – NdAsO4
- Neodymium(II) chloride – NdCl_{2}
- Neodymium(III) chloride – NdCl_{3}
- Neodymium magnet – Nd_{2}Fe_{14}B
- Neodymium(II) bromide – NdBr_{2}
- Neodymium(III) bromide – NdBr_{3}
- Neodymium(III) fluoride – NdF_{3}
- Neodymium(III) hydride – NdH_{3}
- Neodymium(II) iodide – NdI_{2}
- Neodymium(III) iodide – NdI_{3}
- Neodymium molybdate – Nd_{2}(MoO_{4})_{3}
- Neodymium perrhenate – Nd(ReO_{4})_{3}
- Neodymium(III) sulfide – Nd_{2}S_{3}
- Neodymium tantalate – NdTaO_{4}
- Neodymium(III) vanadate – NdVO_{4}

=== Np ===
- Neptunium(III) fluoride – NpF_{3}
- Neptunium(IV) fluoride – NpF_{4}
- Neptunium(IV) oxide – NpO_{2}
- Neptunium(VI) fluoride – NpF_{6}

=== Ni ===
- Nickel(II) carbonate – NiCO_{3}
- Nickel(II) chloride – NiCl_{2}
- Nickel(II) fluoride – NiF_{2}
- Nickel(II) hydroxide – Ni(OH)_{2}
- Nickel(II) nitrate – Ni(NO_{3})_{2}
- Nickel(II) oxide – NiO
- Nickel(II) sulfamate – Ni(SO_{3}NH_{2})_{2}
- Nickel(II) sulfide – NiS

=== Nb ===
- Niobium(IV) fluoride – NbF_{4}
- Niobium(V) fluoride – NbF_{5}
- Niobium oxychloride – NbOCl_{3}
- Niobium pentachloride – NbCl_{5}

=== N ===
- Dinitrogen pentoxide (nitronium nitrate) – N_{2}O_{5}
- Dinitrogen tetrafluoride – N_{2}F_{4}
- Dinitrogen tetroxide – N_{2}O_{4}
- Dinitrogen trioxide – N_{2}O_{3}
- Nitric acid – HNO_{3}
- Nitrous acid – HNO_{2}
- Nitrogen dioxide – NO_{2}
- Nitrogen monoxide – NO
- Nitrous oxide (dinitrogen monoxide, laughing gas, NOS) – N_{2}O
- Nitrogen pentafluoride – NF_{5}
- Nitrogen triiodide – NI_{3}
- Thiazyl fluoride – NSF

=== NO ===
- Nitrosonium octafluoroxenate(VI) – (NO)_{2}XeF_{8}
- Nitrosonium tetrafluoroborate – NOBF_{4}
- Nitrosylsulfuric acid – NOHSO_{4}

== O ==
=== Os ===
- Osmium hexafluoride – OsF_{6}
- Osmium tetroxide (osmium(VIII) oxide) – OsO_{4}
- Osmium trioxide (osmium(VI) oxide) – OsO_{3}

=== O ===
- Tributyltin – C_{24}H_{54}OSn_{2}
- Oxygen difluoride – OF_{2}
- Ozone – O_{3}
- Aluminium oxide – Al_{2}O_{3}
- Americium(II) oxide – AmO
- Americium(IV) oxide – AmO_{2}
- Antimony trioxide – Sb_{2}O_{3}
- Antimony(V) oxide – Sb_{2}O_{5}
- Arsenic trioxide – As_{2}O_{3}
- Arsenic(V) oxide – As_{2}O_{5}
- Barium oxide – BaO
- Beryllium oxide – BeO
- Bismuth(III) oxide – Bi_{2}O_{3}
- Bismuth oxychloride – BiOCl
- Boron trioxide – B_{2}O_{3}
- Bromine monoxide – Br_{2}O
- Carbon dioxide – CO_{2}
- Carbon monoxide – CO
- Cerium(IV) oxide – CeO_{2}
- Chlorine dioxide – ClO_{2}
- Chlorine trioxide – ClO_{3}
- Dichlorine heptaoxide – Cl_{2}O_{7}
- Dichlorine monoxide – Cl_{2}O
- Chromium(III) oxide – Cr_{2}O_{3}
- Chromium(IV) oxide – CrO_{2}
- Chromium(VI) oxide – CrO_{3}
- Cobalt(II) oxide – CoO
- Copper(I) oxide – Cu_{2}O
- Copper(II) oxide – CuO
- Curium(III) oxide – Cm_{2}O_{3}
- Curium(IV) oxide – CmO_{2}
- Dysprosium(III) oxide – Dy_{2}O_{3}
- Erbium(III) oxide – Er_{2}O_{3}
- Europium(III) oxide – Eu_{2}O_{3}
- Oxygen difluoride – OF_{2}
- Dioxygen difluoride – O_{2}F_{2}
- Francium oxide – Fr_{2}O
- Gadolinium(III) oxide – Gd_{2}O_{3}
- Gallium(III) oxide – Ga_{2}O_{3}
- Germanium dioxide – GeO_{2}
- Gold(III) oxide – Au_{2}O_{3}
- Hafnium dioxide – HfO_{2}
- Holmium(III) oxide – Ho_{2}O_{3}
- Indium(I) oxide – In_{2}O
- Indium(III) oxide – In_{2}O_{3}
- Iodine pentoxide – I_{2}O_{5}
- Iridium(IV) oxide – IrO_{2}
- Iron(II) oxide – FeO
- Iron(II,III) oxide – Fe_{3}O_{4}
- Iron(III) oxide – Fe_{2}O_{3}
- Lanthanum(III) oxide – La_{2}O_{3}
- Lead(II) oxide – PbO
- Lead dioxide – PbO_{2}
- Lithium oxide – Li_{2}O
- Magnesium oxide – MgO
- Potassium oxide – K_{2}O
- Rubidium oxide – Rb_{2}O
- Sodium oxide – Na_{2}O
- Strontium oxide – SrO
- Tellurium dioxide – TeO_{2}
- Uranium(IV) oxide – UO_{2}

(only simple oxides, oxyhalides, and related compounds, not hydroxides, carbonates, acids, or other compounds listed elsewhere)

== P ==
=== Pd ===
- Palladium(II) chloride – PdCl_{2}
- Palladium(II) nitrate – Pd(NO_{3})_{2}
- Palladium(II,IV) fluoride – PdF_{3}
- Palladium sulfate – PdSO_{4}
- Palladium tetrafluoride – PdF_{4}

=== P ===
- Diphosphorus tetrachloride – P_{2}Cl_{4}
- Diphosphorus tetrafluoride – P_{2}F_{4}
- Diphosphorus tetraiodide – P_{2}I_{4}
- Hexachlorophosphazene – (NPCl_{2})_{3}
- Phosphine – PH_{3}
- Phosphomolybdic acid – H_{3}PMo_{12}O_{40}
- Phosphoric acid – H_{3}PO_{4}
- Phosphorous acid (Phosphoric(III) acid) – H_{3}PO_{3}
- Phosphoryl nitride – OPN
- Phosphorus pentabromide – PBr_{5}
- Phosphorus pentafluoride – PF_{5}
- Phosphorus pentasulfide – P_{4}S_{10}
- Phosphorus pentoxide – P_{2}O_{5}
- Phosphorus sesquisulfide – P_{4}S_{3}
- Phosphorus tribromide – PBr_{3}
- Phosphorus trichloride – PCl_{3}
- Phosphorus trifluoride – PF_{3}
- Phosphorus triiodide – PI_{3}
- Phosphotungstic acid – H_{3}PW_{12}O_{40}
- Poly(dichlorophosphazene) – (NPCl_{2})_{n}

=== Pt ===
- Platinum(II) chloride – PtCl_{2}
- Platinum(IV) chloride – PtCl_{4}
- Platinum hexafluoride – PtF_{6}
- Platinum pentafluoride – PtF_{5}
- Platinum tetrafluoride – PtF_{4}

=== Pu ===
- Plutonium(III) bromide – PuBr_{3}
- Plutonium(III) chloride – PuCl_{3}
- Plutonium(III) fluoride – PuF_{3}
- Plutonium(III) iodide – PuI_{3}
- Plutonium dihydride – PuH_{2+x}
- Plutonium dioxide (Plutonium(IV) oxide) – PuO_{2}
- Plutonium hexafluoride – PuF_{6}
- Plutonium tetrafluoride – PuF_{4}
- Plutonium trihydride – PuH_{3}

=== Po ===
- Polonium hexafluoride – PoF_{6}
- Polonium monoxide – PoO
- Polonium dioxide – PoO_{2}
- Polonium trioxide – PoO_{3}

=== Ps ===
- Di-positronium – Ps_{2}
- Positronium hydride – PsH

=== K ===
- Potash Alum – K_{2}SO_{4}·Al_{2}(SO_{4})_{3}·24H_{2}O
- Potassium alum – AlK(SO_{4})_{2}
- Potassium aluminium fluoride – KAlF_{4}
- Potassium amide – KNH_{2}
- Potassium argentocyanide – KAg(CN)_{2}
- Potassium arsenite – KAsO_{2}
- Potassium azide – KN_{3}
- Potassium borate – K_{2}B_{4}O_{7}·4H_{2}O
- Potassium bromide – KBr
- Potassium bicarbonate – KHCO_{3}
- Potassium bifluoride – KHF_{2}
- Potassium bisulfite – KHSO_{3}
- Potassium carbonate – K_{2}CO_{3}
- Potassium calcium chloride – KCaCl_{3}
- Potassium chlorate – KClO_{3}
- Potassium chloride – KCl
- Potassium chlorite – KClO_{2}
- Potassium chromate – K_{2}CrO_{4}
- Potassium cyanide – KCN
- Potassium dichromate – K_{2}Cr_{2}O_{7}
- Potassium dithionite – K_{2}S_{2}O_{4}
- Potassium ferrate – K_{2}FeO_{4}
- Potassium ferrioxalate – K_{3}[Fe(C_{2}O_{4})_{3}]
- Potassium ferricyanide – K_{3}[Fe(CN)_{6}]
- Potassium ferrocyanide – K_{4}[Fe(CN)_{6}]
- Potassium heptafluorotantalate – K_{2}[TaF_{7}]
- Potassium hexafluorophosphate – KPF_{6}
- Potassium hydrogen carbonate – KHCO_{3}
- Potassium hydrogen fluoride – KHF_{2}
- Potassium hydroxide/caustic potash – KOH
- Potassium iodide – KI
- Potassium iodate – KIO_{3}
- Potassium manganate – K_{2}MnO_{4}
- Potassium monopersulfate – K_{2}SO_{4}·KHSO_{4}·2KHSO_{5}
- Potassium nitrate – KNO_{3}
- Potassium perbromate – KBrO_{4}
- Potassium perchlorate – KClO_{4}
- Potassium periodate – KIO_{4}
- Potassium permanganate – KMnO_{4}
- Potassium sodium tartrate – KNaC_{4}H_{4}O_{6}
- Potassium sulfate – K_{2}SO_{4}
- Potassium sulfite – K_{2}SO_{3}
- Potassium sulfide – K_{2}S
- Potassium tartrate – K_{2}C_{4}H_{4}O_{6}
- Potassium tetrachloroiodate(III) – KICl_{4}
- Potassium tetraiodomercurate(II) – K_{2}HgI_{4}
- Potassium thiocyanate – KSCN
- Potassium titanyl phosphate – KTiOPO_{4}
- Potassium vanadate – KVO_{3}
- Tripotassium phosphate – K_{3}PO_{4}

=== Pr ===
- Praseodymium(III) chloride – PrCl_{3}
- Praseodymium(III) sulfate – Pr_{2}(SO_{4})_{3}
- Praseodymium(III) bromide – PrBr_{3}
- Praseodymium(III) carbonate – Pr_{2}(CO_{3})_{3}
- Praseodymium(III) chloride – PrCl_{3}
- Praseodymium(III) fluoride – PrF_{3}
- Praseodymium(III) iodide – PrI_{3}
- Praseodymium(III) nitrate – Pr(NO_{3})_{3}
- Praseodymium(III) oxide – Pr_{2}O_{3}
- Praseodymium(III) phosphate – PrPO_{4}
- Praseodymium(III) sulfate – Pr_{2}(SO_{4})_{3}
- Praseodymium(III) sulfide – Pr_{2}S_{3}

=== Pm ===
- Promethium(III) chloride – PmCl_{3}
- Promethium(III) oxide – Pm_{2}O_{3}
- Promethium(III) bromide – PmBr_{3}
- Promethium(III) carbonate – Pm_{2}(CO_{3})_{3}
- Promethium(III) chloride – PmCl_{3}
- Promethium(III) fluoride – PmF_{3}
- Promethium(III) iodide – PmI_{3}
- Promethium(III) nitrate – Pm(NO_{3})_{3}
- Promethium(III) oxide – Pm_{2}O_{3}
- Promethium(III) phosphate – PmPO_{4}
- Promethium(III) sulfate – Pm_{2}(SO_{4})_{3}
- Promethium(III) sulfide – Pm_{2}S_{3}

== R ==
=== Ra ===
- Radium bromide – RaBr_{2}
- Radium carbonate – RaCO_{3}
- Radium chloride – RaCl_{2}
- Radium fluoride – RaF_{2}

=== Rn ===
- Radon difluoride – RnF_{2}

=== Re ===
- Rhenium(IV) oxide – ReO_{2}
- Rhenium(VII) oxide – Re_{2}O_{7}
- Rhenium heptafluoride – ReF_{7}
- Rhenium hexafluoride – ReF_{6}

=== Rh ===
- Rhodium hexafluoride – RhF_{6}
- Rhodium pentafluoride – Rh_{4}F_{20}
- Rhodium(III) chloride – RhCl_{3}
- Rhodium(III) hydroxide – Rh(OH)_{3}
- Rhodium(III) iodide – RhI_{3}
- Rhodium(III) nitrate – Rh(NO_{3})_{3}
- Rhodium(III) oxide – Rh_{2}O_{3}
- Rhodium(III) sulfate – Rh_{2}(SO_{4})_{6}
- Rhodium(III) sulfide – Rh_{2}S_{3}
- Rhodium(IV) fluoride – RhF_{4}
- Rhodium(IV) oxide – RhO_{2}

=== Rb ===
- Rubidium azide – RbN_{3}
- Rubidium bromide – RbBr
- Rubidium chloride – RbCl
- Rubidium fluoride – RbF
- Rubidium hydrogen sulfate – RbHSO_{4}
- Rubidium hydroxide – RbOH
- Rubidium iodide – RbI
- Rubidium nitrate – RbNO_{3}
- Rubidium oxide – Rb_{2}O
- Rubidium telluride – Rb_{2}Te
- Rubidium titanyl phosphate — RbTiOPO_{4}

=== Ru ===
- Ruthenium hexafluoride – RuF_{6}
- Ruthenium pentafluoride – RuF_{5}
- Ruthenium(VIII) oxide – RuO_{4}
- Ruthenium(III) chloride – RuCl_{3}
- Ruthenium(IV) oxide – RuO_{2}

== S ==
=== Sm ===
- Samarium(II) iodide – SmI_{2}
- Samarium(III) chloride – SmCl_{3}
- Samarium(III) oxide – Sm_{2}O_{3}
- Samarium(III) bromide – SmBr_{3}
- Samarium(III) carbonate – Sm_{2}(CO_{3})_{3}
- Samarium(III) fluoride – SmF_{3}
- Samarium(III) iodide – SmI_{3}
- Samarium(III) nitrate – Sm(NO_{3})_{3}
- Samarium(III) oxide – Sm_{2}O_{3}
- Samarium(III) phosphate – SmPO_{4}
- Samarium(III) sulfate – Sm_{2}(SO_{4})_{4}
- Samarium(III) sulfide – Sm_{2}S_{3}

=== Sc ===
- Scandium(III) fluoride – ScF_{3}
- Scandium(III) nitrate – Sc(NO_{3})_{3}
- Scandium(III) oxide – Sc_{2}O_{3}
- Scandium(III) triflate – Sc(OSO_{2}CF_{3})_{3}

=== Sg ===
- Seaborgium hexacarbonyl – Sg(CO)_{6}

=== Se ===
- Selenic acid – H_{2}SeO_{4}
- Selenious acid – H_{2}SeO_{3}
- Selenium dibromide – SeBr_{2}
- Selenium dioxide – SeO_{2}
- Selenium disulfide – SeS_{2}
- Selenium hexafluoride – SeF_{6}
- Selenium hexasulfide – Se_{2}S_{6}
- Selenium oxybromide – SeOBr_{2}
- Selenium oxydichloride – SeOCl_{2}
- Selenium tetrachloride – SeCl_{4}
- Selenium tetrafluoride – SeF_{4}
- Selenium trioxide – SeO_{3}
- Selenoyl fluoride – SeO_{2}F_{2}

=== Si ===
- Disilane – Si_{2}H_{6}
- Silane – SiH_{4}
- Silica gel – SiO_{2}·nH_{2}O
- Silicic acid – Si(OH)_{4}
- Silicochloroform, trichlorosilane – SiHCl_{3}
- Silicofluoric acid – H_{2}SiF_{6}
- Silicon boride – SiB_{3}
- Silicon carbide (carborundum) – SiC
- Silicon dioxide – SiO_{2}
- Silicon monoxide – SiO
- Silicon nitride – Si_{3}N_{4}
- Silicon tetrabromide – SiBr_{4}
- Silicon tetrachloride – SiCl_{4}
- Silicon tetrafluoride – SiF_{4}
- Silicon tetraiodide – SiI_{4}
- Thortveitite – (Sc,Y)_{2}Si_{2}O_{7}

=== Ag ===
- Silver(I) fluoride – AgF
- Silver(II) fluoride – AgF_{2}
- Silver acetylide – Ag_{2}C_{2}
- Silver argentocyanide – KAg(CN)_{2}
- Silver azide – AgN_{3}
- Silver bromate – AgBrO_{3}
- Silver bromide – AgBr
- Silver chlorate – AgClO_{3}
- Silver chloride – AgCl
- Silver chromate – Ag_{2}CrO_{4}
- Silver fluoroborate – AgBF_{4}
- Silver fulminate – AgCNO
- Silver hydroxide – AgOH
- Silver iodide – AgI
- Silver nitrate – AgNO_{3}
- Silver nitride – Ag_{3}N
- Silver oxide – Ag_{2}O
- Silver perchlorate – AgClO_{4}
- Silver permanganate – AgMnO_{4}
- Silver phosphate (silver orthophosphate) – Ag_{3}PO_{4}
- Silver subfluoride – Ag_{2}F
- Silver sulfate – Ag_{2}SO_{4}
- Silver sulfide – Ag_{2}S

=== Na ===
- Sodamide – NaNH_{2}
- Sodium aluminate – NaAlO_{2}
- Sodium arsenate – H_{24}Na_{3}AsO_{16}
- Sodium azide – NaN_{3}
- Sodium bicarbonate – NaHCO_{3}
- Sodium biselenide – NaSeH
- Sodium bisulfate – NaHSO_{4}
- Sodium bisulfite – NaHSO_{3}
- Sodium borate – Na_{2}B_{4}O_{7}
- Sodium borohydride – NaBH_{4}
- Sodium bromate – NaBrO_{3}
- Sodium bromide – NaBr
- Sodium bromite – NaBrO_{2}
- Sodium carbide – Na_{2}C_{2}
- Sodium carbonate – Na_{2}CO_{3}
- Sodium chlorate – NaClO_{3}
- Sodium chloride – NaCl
- Sodium chlorite – NaClO_{2}
- Sodium cobaltinitrite – CoN_{6}Na_{3}O_{12}
- Sodium copper tetrachloride – Na_{2}CuCl_{4}
- Sodium cyanate – NaCNO
- Sodium cyanide – NaCN
- Sodium dichromate – Na_{2}Cr_{2}O_{7}·2H_{2}O
- Sodium dioxide – NaO_{2}
- Sodium dithionite – Na_{2}S_{2}O_{4}
- Sodium ferrocyanide – Na_{4}[Fe(CN)_{6}]
- Sodium fluoride – NaF
- Sodium fluorosilicate – Na_{2}[SiF_{6}]
- Sodium formate – HCOONa
- Sodium hydride – NaH
- Sodium hydrogen carbonate (Sodium bicarbonate) – NaHCO_{3}
- Sodium hydrosulfide – NaSH
- Sodium hydroxide – NaOH
- Sodium hypobromite – NaOBr
- Sodium hypochlorite – NaOCl
- Sodium hypoiodite – NaOI
- Sodium hypophosphite – NaPO_{2}H_{2}
- Sodium iodate – NaIO_{3}
- Sodium iodide – NaI
- Sodium manganate – Na_{2}MnO_{4}
- Sodium molybdate – Na_{2}MoO_{4}
- Sodium monofluorophosphate (MFP) – Na_{2}PFO_{3}
- Sodium nitrate – NaNO_{3}
- Sodium nitrite – NaNO_{2}
- Sodium nitroprusside – Na_{2}[Fe(CN)_{5}NO]·2H_{2}O
- Sodium oxide – Na_{2}O
- Sodium perborate – NaBO_{3}·H_{2}O
- Sodium perbromate – NaBrO_{4}
- Sodium percarbonate – 2Na_{2}CO_{3}·3H_{2}O_{2}
- Sodium perchlorate – NaClO_{4}
- Sodium periodate – NaIO_{4}
- Sodium permanganate – NaMnO_{4}
- Sodium peroxide – Na_{2}O_{2}
- Sodium peroxycarbonate – Na_{2}CO_{4}
- Sodium perrhenate – NaReO_{4}
- Sodium persulfate – Na_{2}S_{2}O_{8}
- Sodium phosphate; see trisodium phosphate – Na_{3}PO_{4}
- Sodium selenate – Na_{2}O_{4}Se
- Sodium selenide – Na_{2}Se
- Sodium selenite – Na_{2}SeO_{3}
- Sodium silicate – Na_{2}SiO_{3}
- Sodium sulfate – Na_{2}SO_{4}
- Sodium sulfide – Na_{2}S
- Sodium sulfite – Na_{2}SO_{3}
- Sodium tartrate – C_{4}H_{4}Na_{2}O_{6}
- Sodium tellurite – Na_{2}TeO_{3}
- Sodium tetrachloroaluminate – NaAlCl_{4}
- Sodium tetrafluoroborate – NaBF_{4}
- Sodium thioantimoniate – Na_{3}(SbS_{4})·9H_{2}O
- Sodium thiocyanate – NaSCN
- Sodium thiosulfate – Na_{2}S_{2}O_{3}
- Sodium tungstate – Na_{2}WO_{4}
- Sodium uranate – Na_{2}O_{7}U_{2}
- Sodium zincate – H_{4}Na_{2}O_{4}Zn
- Trisodium phosphate – Na_{3}PO_{4}

=== Sr ===
- Strontium bromide – SrBr_{2}
- Strontium carbonate – SrCO_{3}
- Strontium chloride – SrCl_{2}
- Strontium fluoride – SrF_{2}
- Strontium hydroxide – Sr(OH)_{2}
- Strontium iodide – SrI_{2}
- Strontium nitrate – Sr(NO_{3})_{2}
- Strontium oxide – SrO
- Strontium titanate – SrTiO_{3}
- Strontium bicarbonate – Sr(HCO_{3})_{2}
- Strontium boride – SrB_{6}
- Strontium bromide – SrBr_{2}
- Strontium carbide – SrC_{2}
- Strontium carbonate – SrCO_{3}
- Strontium chloride – SrCl_{2}
- Strontium cyanamide – SrCN_{2}
- Strontium fluoride – SrF_{2}
- Strontium fluorophosphate – SrPO_{3}F
- Strontium gluconate – Sr(HOCH_{2}(CHOH)_{4}CO_{2})_{2}
- Strontium hydride – SrH_{2}
- Strontium hydrogen phosphate – SrHPO_{4}
- Strontium hydroxide – Sr(OH)_{2}
- Strontium hypochlorite – Sr(OCl)_{2}
- Strontium iodide – SrI_{2}
- Strontium molybdate – SrMoO_{4}
- Strontium nitrate – Sr(NO_{3})_{2}
- Strontium oxalate – SrC_{2}O_{4}
- Strontium oxide – SrO
- Strontium peroxide – SrO_{2}
- Strontium phosphate – Sr_{3}(PO_{4})_{2}
- Strontium silicate – SrSiO_{3}
- Strontium sulfate – SrSO_{4}
- Strontium sulfide – SrS
- Strontium titanate – SrTiO_{3}
- Strontium tungstate – SrWO_{4}
- Strontium zirconate – SrZrO_{3}

=== S ===
- Disulfur decafluoride – S_{2}F_{10}
- Disulfur dichloride – S_{2}Cl_{2}
- Hydrogen sulfide (sulfane) – H_{2}S
- Pyrosulfuric acid – H_{2}S_{2}O_{7}
- Sulfamic acid – H_{3}NO_{3}S
- Sulfur dibromide – Br_{2}S
- Sulfur dioxide – SO_{2}
- Sulfur hexafluoride – SF_{6}
- Sulfur tetrafluoride – SF_{4}
- Sulfuric acid – H_{2}SO_{4}
- Sulfurous acid – H_{2}SO_{3}
- Sulfuryl chloride – SO_{2}Cl_{2}
- Tetrasulfur tetranitride – S_{4}N_{4}
- Persulfuric acid (Caro's acid) – H_{2}SO_{5}

== T ==
=== Ta ===
- Tantalum arsenide – TaAs
- Tantalum carbide – TaC
- Tantalum pentafluoride – TaF_{5}
- Tantalum(V) oxide – Ta_{2}O_{5}

=== Tc ===
- Technetium hexafluoride – TcF_{6}
- Ammonium pertechnetate – NH_{4}TcO_{4}
- Sodium pertechnetate – NaTcO_{4}

=== Te ===
- Ditellurium bromide – Te_{2}Br
- Telluric acid – H_{6}TeO_{6}
- Tellurium dioxide – TeO_{2}
- Tellurium hexafluoride – TeF_{6}
- Tellurium tetrabromide – TeBr_{4}
- Tellurium tetrachloride – TeCl_{4}
- Tellurium tetrafluoride – TeF_{4}
- Tellurium tetraiodide – TeI_{4}
- Tellurous acid – H_{2}TeO_{3}
- Beryllium telluride – BeTe
- Bismuth telluride – Bi_{2}Te_{3}
- Cadmium telluride – CdTe
- Cadmium zinc telluride – (Cd,Zn)Te
- Dimethyltelluride – (CH_{3})_{2}Te
- Mercury Cadmium Telluride – (Hg,Cd)Te
- Lead telluride – PbTe
- Mercury telluride – HgTe
- Mercury zinc telluride – (Hg,Zn)Te
- Silver telluride – Ag_{2}Te
- Tin telluride – SnTe
- Zinc telluride – ZnTe
- Teflic acid – HOTeF_{5}
- Telluric acid – H_{6}TeO_{6}
- Sodium tellurite – Na_{2}TeO_{3}
- Tellurium dioxide – TeO_{2}
- Tellurium hexafluoride – TeF_{6}
- Tellurium tetrafluoride – TeF_{4}
- Tellurium tetrachloride – TeCl_{4}

=== Tb ===
- Terbium(III) chloride – TbCl_{3}
- Terbium(III) bromide – TbBr_{3}
- Terbium(III) carbonate – Tb_{2}(CO_{3})_{3}
- Terbium(III) chloride – TbCl_{3}
- Terbium(III) fluoride – TbF_{3}
- Terbium(III) iodide – TbI_{3}
- Terbium(III) nitrate – Tb(NO_{3})_{3}
- Terbium(III) oxide – Tb_{2}O_{3}
- Terbium(III) phosphate – TbPO_{4}
- Terbium(III) sulfate – Tb_{2}(SO_{4})_{3}
- Terbium(III) sulfide – Tb_{2}S_{3}

=== Tl ===
- Thallium(I) bromide – TlBr
- Thallium(I) carbonate – Tl_{2}CO_{3}
- Thallium(I) fluoride – TlF
- Thallium(I) sulfate – Tl_{2}SO_{4}
- Thallium(III) oxide – Tl_{2}O_{3}
- Thallium(III) sulfate – Tl_{2}(SO_{4})_{3}
- Thallium triiodide – TlI_{3}
- Thallium antimonide – TlSb
- Thallium arsenide – TlAs
- Thallium(III) bromide – TlBr_{3}
- Thallium(III) chloride – TlCl_{3}
- Thallium(III) fluoride – TlF_{3}
- Thallium(I) iodide – TlI
- Thallium(III) nitrate – Tl(NO_{3})_{3}
- Thallium(I) oxide – Tl_{2}O
- Thallium(III) oxide – Tl_{2}O_{3}
- Thallium phosphide – TlP
- Thallium(III) selenide – Tl_{2}Se_{3}
- Thallium(III) sulfate – Tl_{2}(SO_{4})_{3}
- Thallium(III) sulfide – Tl_{2}S_{3}
- TrimethylThallium – Tl(CH_{3})_{3}
- Thallium(I) hydroxide – TlOH

=== SO ===
- Thionyl chloride – SOCl_{2}
- Thionyl tetrafluoride – SOF_{4}

=== ClS ===
- Thiophosgene – CSCl_{2}
- Thiophosphoryl chloride – Cl_{3}PS

=== Th ===
- Thorium(IV) nitrate – Th(NO_{3})_{4}
- Thorium(IV) sulfate – Th(SO_{4})_{2}
- Thorium dioxide – ThO_{2}
- Thorium tetrafluoride – ThF_{4}

=== Tm ===
- Thulium(III) bromide – TmBr_{3}
- Thulium(III) chloride – TmCl_{3}
- Thulium(III) oxide – Tm_{2}O_{3}

=== Sn ===
- Stannane – SnH_{4}
- Tin(II) bromide – SnBr_{2}
- Tin(II) chloride (stannous chloride) – SnCl_{2}
- Tin(II) fluoride – SnF_{2}
- Tin(II) hydroxide – Sn(OH)_{2}
- Tin(II) iodide – SnI_{2}
- Tin(II) oxide – SnO
- Tin(II) sulfate – SnSO_{4}
- Tin(II) sulfide – SnS
- Tin(IV) bromide – SnBr_{4}
- Tin(IV) chloride – SnCl_{4}
- Tin(IV) fluoride – SnF_{4}
- Tin(IV) iodide – SnI_{4}
- Tin(IV) oxide – SnO_{2}
- Tin(IV) sulfide – SnS_{2}
- Tin(IV) cyanide – Sn(CN)_{4}
- Tin selenide – SnSe_{2}
- Tin telluride – SnTe

=== Ti ===
- Hexafluorotitanic acid – (H_{3}O)_{2}[TiF_{6}]
- Titanium(II) chloride – TiCl_{2}
- Titanium(II) oxide – TiO
- Titanium(II) sulfide – TiS
- Titanium(III) bromide – TiBr_{3}
- Titanium(III) chloride – TiCl_{3}
- Titanium(III) fluoride – TiF_{3}
- Titanium(III) iodide – TiI_{3}
- Titanium(III) oxide – Ti_{2}O_{3}
- Titanium(III) phosphide – TiP
- Titanium(IV) bromide (titanium tetrabromide) – TiBr_{4}
- Titanium(IV) carbide – TiC
- Titanium(IV) chloride (titanium tetrachloride) – TiCl_{4}
- Titanium(IV) hydride – TiH_{4}
- Titanium(IV) iodide (titanium tetraiodide) – TiI_{4}
- Titanium carbide – TiC
- Titanium diboride – TiB_{2}
- Titanium dioxide (titanium(IV) oxide) – TiO_{2}
- Titanium diselenide – TiSe_{2}
- Titanium disilicide – TiSi_{2}
- Titanium disulfide – TiS_{2}
- Titanium nitrate – Ti(NO_{3})_{4}
- Titanium nitride – TiN
- Titanium perchlorate – Ti(ClO_{4})_{4}
- Titanium silicon carbide – Ti_{3}SiC_{2}
- Titanium tetrabromide – TiBr_{4}
- Titanium tetrafluoride – TiF_{4}
- Titanium tetraiodide – TiI_{4}

=== TiO ===
- Titanyl sulfate – TiOSO_{4}

=== W ===
- Tungsten(VI) chloride – WCl_{6}
- Tungsten(VI) fluoride – WF_{6}
- Tungsten boride – WB_{2}
- Tungsten carbide – WC
- Tungstic acid – H_{2}WO_{4}
- Tungsten hexacarbonyl – W(CO)_{6}

== U ==
=== U ===
- Triuranium octaoxide (pitchblende or yellowcake) – U_{3}O_{8}
- Uranium hexafluoride – UF_{6}
- Uranium pentafluoride – UF_{5}
- Uranium sulfate – U(SO_{4})_{2}
- Uranium tetrachloride – UCl_{4}
- Uranium tetrafluoride – UF_{4}
- Uranium(III) chloride – UCl_{3}
- Uranium(IV) chloride – UCl_{4}
- Uranium(V) chloride – UCl_{5}
- Uranium hexachloride – UCl_{6}
- Uranium(IV) fluoride – UF_{4}
- Uranium pentafluoride – UF_{5}
- Uranium(VI) fluoride – UF_{6}
- Uranyl peroxide – UO_{4}
- Uranium dioxide – UO_{2}

=== UO_{2} ===
- Uranyl carbonate – UO_{2}CO_{3}
- Uranyl chloride – UO_{2}Cl_{2}
- Uranyl fluoride – UO_{2}F_{2}
- Uranyl hydroxide – UO_{2}(OH)_{2}
- Uranyl hydroxide – (UO_{2})_{2}(OH)_{4}
- Uranyl nitrate – UO_{2}(NO_{3})_{2}
- Uranyl sulfate – UO_{2}SO_{4}

== V ==
=== V ===
- Vanadium(II) chloride – VCl_{2}
- Vanadium(II) oxide – VO
- Vanadium(III) bromide – VBr_{3}
- Vanadium(III) chloride – VCl_{3}
- Vanadium(III) fluoride – VF_{3}
- Vanadium(III) nitride – VN
- Vanadium(III) oxide – V_{2}O_{3}
- Vanadium(IV) chloride – VCl_{4}
- Vanadium(IV) fluoride – VF_{4}
- Vanadium(IV) oxide – VO_{2}
- Vanadium(IV) sulfate – VOSO_{4}
- Vanadium(V) oxide – V_{2}O_{5}
- Vanadium carbide – VC
- Vanadium oxytrichloride (Vanadium(V) oxide trichloride) – VOCl_{3}
- Vanadium pentafluoride – VF_{5}
- Vanadium tetrachloride – VCl_{4}
- Vanadium tetrafluoride – VF_{4}

== W ==
- Water – H_{2}O

== X ==
=== Xe ===
- Perxenic acid – H_{4}XeO_{6}
- Xenon difluoride – XeF_{2}
- Xenon hexafluoride – XeF_{6}
- Xenon hexafluoroplatinate – Xe[PtF_{6}]
- Xenon tetrafluoride – XeF_{4}
- Xenon tetroxide – XeO_{4}
- Xenic acid – H_{2}XeO_{4}

== Y ==
=== Yb ===
- Ytterbium(III) chloride – YbCl_{3}
- Ytterbium(III) oxide – Yb_{2}O_{3}
- Ytterbium(III) sulfate – Yb_{2}(SO_{4})_{3}
- Ytterbium(III) bromide – YbBr_{3}
- Ytterbium(III) carbonate – Yb_{2}(CO_{3})_{3}
- Ytterbium(III) chloride – YbCl_{3}
- Ytterbium(III) fluoride – YbF_{3}
- Ytterbium(III) iodide – YbI_{3}
- Ytterbium(III) nitrate – Yb(NO_{3})_{3}
- Ytterbium(III) oxide – Yb_{2}O_{3}
- Ytterbium(III) phosphate – YbPO_{4}
- Ytterbium(III) sulfate – Yb_{2}(SO_{4})_{3}
- Ytterbium(III) sulfide – Yb_{2}S_{3}

=== Y ===
- Yttrium(III) antimonide – YSb
- Yttrium(III) arsenate – YAsO_{4}
- Yttrium(III) arsenide – YAs
- Yttrium(III) bromide – YBr_{3}
- Yttrium(III) fluoride – YF_{3}
- Yttrium(III) oxide – Y_{2}O_{3}
- Yttrium(III) nitrate – Y(NO_{3})_{3}
- Yttrium(III) sulfide – Y_{2}S_{3}
- Yttrium(III) sulfate – Y_{2}(SO_{4})_{3}
- Yttrium aluminium garnet – Y_{3}Al_{5}O_{12}
- Yttrium barium copper oxide – YBa_{2}Cu_{3}O_{7}
- Yttrium cadmium – YCd
- Yttrium copper – YCu
- Yttrium gold – YAu
- Yttrium iridium – YIr
- Yttrium iron garnet – Y_{3}Fe_{5}O_{12}
- Yttrium magnesium – YMg
- Yttrium phosphate – YPO_{4}
- Yttrium phosphide – YP
- Yttrium rhodium – YRh
- Yttrium silver – YAg
- Yttrium zinc – YZn

== Z ==
=== Zn ===
- Zinc arsenide – Zn_{3}As_{2}
- Zinc bromide – ZnBr_{2}
- Zinc carbonate – ZnCO_{3}
- Zinc chloride – ZnCl_{2}
- Zinc cyanide – Zn(CN)_{2}
- Zinc diphosphide – ZnP_{2}
- Zinc fluoride – ZnF_{2}
- Zinc iodide – ZnI_{2}
- Zinc nitrate – Zn(NO_{3})_{2}
- Zinc oxide – ZnO
- Zinc phosphide – Zn_{3}P_{2}
- Zinc pyrophosphate – Zn_{2}P_{2}O_{7}
- Zinc selenate – ZnSeO_{4}
- Zinc selenide – ZnSe
- Zinc selenite – ZnSeO_{3}
- Zinc selenocyanate – Zn(SeCN)_{2}
- Zinc sulfate – ZnSO_{4}
- Zinc sulfide – ZnS
- Zinc sulfite – ZnSO_{3}
- Zinc telluride – ZnTe
- Zinc thiocyanate – Zn(SCN)_{2}
- Zinc tungstate – ZnWO_{4}

=== Zr ===
- Zirconia hydrate – ZrO_{2}·nH_{2}O
- Zirconium boride – ZrB_{2}
- Zirconium carbide – ZrC
- Zirconium(IV) chloride – ZrCl_{4}
- Zirconium(IV) oxide – ZrO_{2}
- Zirconium hydroxide – Zr(OH)_{4}
- Zirconium orthosilicate – ZrSiO_{4}
- Zirconium nitride – ZrN
- Zirconium tetrafluoride – ZrF_{4}
- Zirconium tetrahydroxide – H_{4}O_{4}Zr
- Zirconium tungstate – ZrW_{2}O_{8}
- Zirconyl bromide – ZrOBr_{2}
- Zirconyl chloride – ZrOCl_{2}
- Zirconyl nitrate – ZrO(NO_{3})_{2}
- Zirconyl sulfate – ZrOSO_{4}
- Zirconium dioxide – ZrO_{2}
- Zirconium nitride – ZrN
- Zirconium tetrachloride – ZrCl_{4}
- Zirconium(IV) sulfide – ZrS_{2}
- Zirconium(IV) silicide – ZrSi_{2}
- Zirconium(IV) silicate – ZrSiO_{4}
- Zirconium(IV) fluoride – ZrF_{4}
- Zirconium(IV) bromide – ZrBr_{4}
- Zirconium(IV) iodide – ZrI_{4}
- Zirconium(IV) hydroxide – Zr(OH)_{4}
- Schwartz's reagent – C_{10}H_{11}ClZr
- Zirconium propionate – Zr(CH_{3}CH_{2}COO)_{4}
- Zirconium tungstate – Zr(WO_{4})_{2}
- Zirconium(II) hydride – ZrH_{2}
- Lead zirconate titanate – Pb(Zr_{x}Ti_{1−x}O_{3})

== See also ==
- Dictionary of chemical formulas
- List of alchemical substances
- List of biomolecules
- List of compounds
- List of copper salts
- List of inorganic compounds named after people
- List of minerals
- List of organic compounds
- List of organic salts
- Named inorganic compounds
- Polyatomic ions
