= Dysprosium(III) telluride =

Identifiers
CAS Number	12159-43-2
3D model (JSmol)	Interactive image
ECHA InfoCard	100.032.068
EC Number	235-288-9
PubChem CID	6336989
- InChI: InChI=1S/2Dy.3Te Key: ISSYQCZLWJTXOM-UHFFFAOYSA-N
- SMILES: [Te].[Te].[Te].[Dy].[Dy]

Properties
Chemical formula	Dy_{2}Te_{3}
Molar mass	707.80
Melting point	around 1550 °C

Structure
Crystal structure	Sc_{2}S_{3}
- Except where otherwise noted, data are given for materials in their standard state (at 25 °C [77 °F], 100 kPa). Infobox references

Dysprosium(III) telluride is an inorganic compound, one of the tellurides of dysprosium, with the chemical formula Dy_{2}Te_{3}, where Dy is in the +3 oxidation state.

== Preparation ==
Dysprosium(III) telluride can be obtained by reacting tellurium and dysprosium in a stoichiometric ratio:

2 Dy + 3 Te → Dy_{2}Te_{3}

== Properties ==
Dysprosium(III) telluride reacts with copper(II) telluride at high temperature to obtain phases such as DyCuTe_{2}, DyCu_{5}Te_{4}, and Dy_{7}Cu_{3}Te_{12}. It and cadmium telluride can form CdDy_{2}Te_{4} at high temperatures:

Dy_{2}Te_{3} + CdTe → CdDy_{2}Te_{4}
