= Europium(III) perchlorate =

Names
- Other names Europium perchlorate

Identifiers
CAS Number	13537-22-9; hexahydrate: 951408-37-0
3D model (JSmol)	Interactive image; hexahydrate: Interactive image
ChemSpider	58803253
ECHA InfoCard	100.033.537
EC Number	236-907-5
PubChem CID	11733073; hexahydrate: 129630095
- InChI: InChI=1S/3ClHO4.Eu/c3*2-1(3,4)5;/h3*(H,2,3,4,5);/q;;;+3/p-3 Key: KDBBDPJZIDRZFY-UHFFFAOYSA-K; hexahydrate: InChI=1S/3ClHO4.Eu.6H2O/c3*2-1(3,4)5;;;;;;;/h3*(H,2,3,4,5);;6*1H2/q;;;+3;;;;;;/p-3 Key: WBHAQAZAYAMWIV-UHFFFAOYSA-K
- SMILES: [O-]Cl(=O)(=O)=O.[O-]Cl(=O)(=O)=O.[O-]Cl(=O)(=O)=O.[Eu+3]; hexahydrate: O.O.O.O.O.O.[O-]Cl(=O)(=O)=O.[O-]Cl(=O)(=O)=O.[O-]Cl(=O)(=O)=O.[Eu+3]

Properties
Chemical formula	Eu(ClO_{4})_{3}
Molar mass	450.32 g/mol
Appearance	Crystalline solid
Solubility in water	Soluble in water

Structure
Crystal structure	Hexagonal (anhydrous)
Space group	P6_{3}/m, No. 176
Lattice constant	a = 0.92496 nm, c = 0.57486 nm
Formula units (Z)	2
- Except where otherwise noted, data are given for materials in their standard state (at 25 °C [77 °F], 100 kPa). Infobox references

Europium(III) perchlorate is an inorganic compound of europium in the +3 oxidation state and the perchlorate ion, with the formula Eu(ClO_{4})_{3}. It is known in anhydrous form and as hydrated salts, including the hexahydrate. Anhydrous europium(III) perchlorate crystallizes in the hexagonal structure characteristic of many rare-earth perchlorates.

== Preparation ==
Hydrated europium(III) perchlorate can be prepared by dissolving europium(III) oxide in aqueous perchloric acid:

Eu_{2}O_{3} + 6 HClO_{4} → 2 Eu(ClO_{4})_{3} + 3 H_{2}O

Single crystals of anhydrous Eu(ClO_{4})_{3} have been obtained by slow dehydration of a hydrated product prepared from Eu_{2}O_{3} and perchloric acid.

== Properties ==
=== Anhydrous structure ===
Anhydrous Eu(ClO_{4})_{3} crystallizes in the hexagonal crystal system, space group P6_{3}/m (No. 176), with lattice parameters a = 9.2496(9) Å and c = 5.7486(8) Å, and two formula units per unit cell. The structure consists of tricapped trigonal EuO_{9} prisms linked by perchlorate tetrahedra. Each Eu^{3+} ion is nine-coordinate. One oxygen atom of each perchlorate group does not coordinate to europium and points toward empty channels running parallel to the [001] direction. Powder diffraction refinements place Eu(ClO_{4})_{3} within the isostructural hexagonal lanthanide-perchlorate series extending from La through the low-temperature form of Tm.

=== Hydrates and aqueous solution ===
A hexahydrate, Eu(ClO_{4})_{3}·6H_{2}O, is a commonly reported hydrated form. In dilute aqueous solution, Eu^{3+} is strongly hydrated. Raman spectroscopy places europium near the crossover between nona-aqua and octaaqua rare-earth hydration, with the Eu–O symmetric stretching band observed near 367 cm^{−1}. Perchlorate behaves mainly as a weakly coordinating counterion in dilute solution, while ion pairing becomes increasingly important at higher concentrations.

== Coordination chemistry ==
Europium(III) perchlorate is used as a soluble source of Eu^{3+} in coordination and luminescence chemistry, particularly where a weakly coordinating counterion is desirable. Complexes of europium perchlorate with sulfoxide ligands have been studied by fluorescence spectroscopy.

== Safety ==
Europium(III) perchlorate is an oxidizing perchlorate salt and should be kept away from combustible and strongly reducing materials.
