= Dysprosium(III) selenide =

Identifiers
CAS Number	12020-04-1
3D model (JSmol)	Interactive image
ChemSpider	145431
ECHA InfoCard	100.031.490
EC Number	234-652-4
PubChem CID	165975
CompTox Dashboard (EPA)	DTXSID00923265
- InChI: InChI=1S/2Dy.3Se/q2*+3;3*-2 Key: AXKRJHNJTNYZJO-UHFFFAOYSA-N
- SMILES: [Se-2].[Se-2].[Se-2].[Dy+3].[Dy+3]

Properties
Chemical formula	Dy_{2}Se_{3}
Molar mass	561.913 g·mol^{−1}
- Except where otherwise noted, data are given for materials in their standard state (at 25 °C [77 °F], 100 kPa). Infobox references

Dysprosium(III) selenide is one of the selenides of dysprosium, with the chemical formula of Dy_{2}Se_{3}.

== Preparation ==
Dysprosium(III) selenide can be prepared by reacting dysprosium(III) oxide or dysprosium(III) chloride with hydrogen selenide:

Dy_{2}O_{3} + 3 H_{2}Se → Dy_{2}Se_{3} + 3 H_{2}O
2 DyCl_{3} + 3 H_{2}Se → Dy_{2}Se_{3} + 6 HCl

It can also be obtained by reacting the elements at high temperatures:

2 Dy + 3 Se → Dy_{2}Se_{3}

== Properties ==
Dysprosium(III) selenide reacts with arsenic triselenide to obtain DyAsSe_{3}.

Dy_{2}Se_{3} + As_{2}Se_{3} → 2DyAsSe_{3}
