= Erbium disilicide =

Names
- Other names Erbium silicide, erbium(II) silicide

Identifiers
CAS Number	12020-28-9
3D model (JSmol)	Interactive image
ChemSpider	129556665
EC Number	234-656-6
PubChem CID	170843474
- InChI: InChI=1S/Er.2Si Key: BXEFGWNSOIIKRB-UHFFFAOYSA-N
- SMILES: [Si].[Si].[Er]

Properties
Chemical formula	ErSi_{2}
Molar mass	223.429 g·mol^{−1}
Appearance	Dark gray powder
Density	7.26 g/cm^{3}
Solubility in water	insoluble

Structure
Crystal structure	Orthorhombic
Space group	P6/mmm
- Except where otherwise noted, data are given for materials in their standard state (at 25 °C [77 °F], 100 kPa). Infobox references

Erbium disilicide is a binary inorganic compound of erbium and silicon with the chemical formula ErSi_{2}. Other erbium silicides (ErSi, Er_{2}Si) are known.

== Physical properties ==
ErSi_{2} forms dark grey crystals of orthorhombic system. Space group P6/mmm.

== Uses ==
The compound has been investigated for semiconductor use, optoelectronics, high-temperature electronics, alloy additives and protective coatings.
