= Californium(III) nitrate =

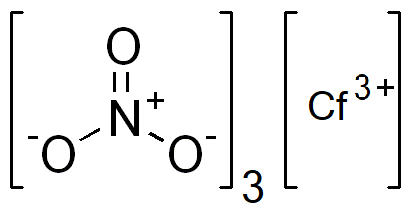

Identifiers
CAS Number	35311-13-8
3D model (JSmol)	Interactive image; ^{252}Cf: Interactive image
ChemSpider	^{252}Cf: 64882456
- InChI: InChI=1S/Cf.3NO3/c;3*2-1(3)4/q;3*-1/i1+1;;; Key: PAJJFBUGCBKDHP-GMTIZOJPSA-N
- SMILES: [N+](=O)([O-])[O-].[N+](=O)([O-])[O-].[N+](=O)([O-])[O-].[Cf]; ^{252}Cf: [N+](=O)([O-])[O-].[N+](=O)([O-])[O-].[N+](=O)([O-])[O-].[252Cf+3]

Properties
Chemical formula	CfN_{3}O_{9}
Molar mass	437 g·mol^{−1}
Density	g/cm^{3}
Solubility in water	Soluble
- Except where otherwise noted, data are given for materials in their standard state (at 25 °C [77 °F], 100 kPa). Infobox references

Californium(III) nitrate is an inorganic compound of californium with the formula Cf(NO_{3})_{3}. It can be used as a precursor to other californium compounds.
