= Rhodium(III) nitrate =

Names
- Other names: Rhodium trinitrate

Identifiers
CAS Number	10139-58-9
3D model (JSmol)	Interactive image
ChemSpider	132398
ECHA InfoCard	100.030.348
EC Number	233-397-6
PubChem CID	150190
CompTox Dashboard (EPA)	DTXSID40890644
- InChI: InChI=1S/3NO3.Rh/c3*2-1(3)4;/q3*-1;+3 Key: VXNYVYJABGOSBX-UHFFFAOYSA-N
- SMILES: [N+](=O)([O-])[O-].[N+](=O)([O-])[O-].[N+](=O)([O-])[O-].[Rh+3]

Properties
Chemical formula	Rh(NO_{3})_{3}
Molar mass	288.92 g/mol
Appearance	Yellow solid
Density	1.41 g/cm^{3}
Solubility in water	Soluble

Structure
Crystal structure	Hexagonal

Hazards
- GHS labelling
Pictograms	(GHS03: Oxidizing) (GHS05: Corrosive) (GHS08: Health hazard) (GHS09: Environmental hazard)
Signal word	Danger
Hazard statements	H271, H290, H302, H314, H317, H341, H410
Precautionary statements	P201, P202, P210, P220, P221, P234, P260, P264, P270, P272, P273, P280, P281, P283, P301+P312, P301+P330+P331, P302+P352, P303+P361+P353, P304+P340, P305+P351+P338, P306+P360, P308+P313, P310, P321, P330, P333+P313, P363, P370+P378, P371+P380+P375, P390, P391, P404, P405, P501

Related compounds
Other anions	Rhodium(III) sulfate
Other cations	Cobalt(III) nitrate
- Except where otherwise noted, data are given for materials in their standard state (at 25 °C [77 °F], 100 kPa). Infobox references

Rhodium(III) nitrate is an inorganic compound, a salt of rhodium and nitric acid with the formula Rh(NO_{3})_{3}. This anhydrous complex has been the subject of theoretical analysis but has not been isolated. However, a dihydrate and an aqueous solution are known with similar stoichiometry; they contain various hexacoordinated rhodium(III) aqua and nitrate complexes. A number of other rhodium nitrates have been characterized by X-ray crystallography: Rb_{4}[trans-[Rh(H_{2}O)_{2}(NO_{3})_{4}][Rh(NO_{3})_{6}] and Cs_{2}[-[Rh(NO_{3})_{5}]. Rhodium nitrates are of interest because nuclear wastes, which contain rhodium, are recycled by dissolution in nitric acid.

== Uses ==
Rhodium(III) nitrate is used as a precursor to synthesize rhodium.
