= Yttrium(III) sulfate =

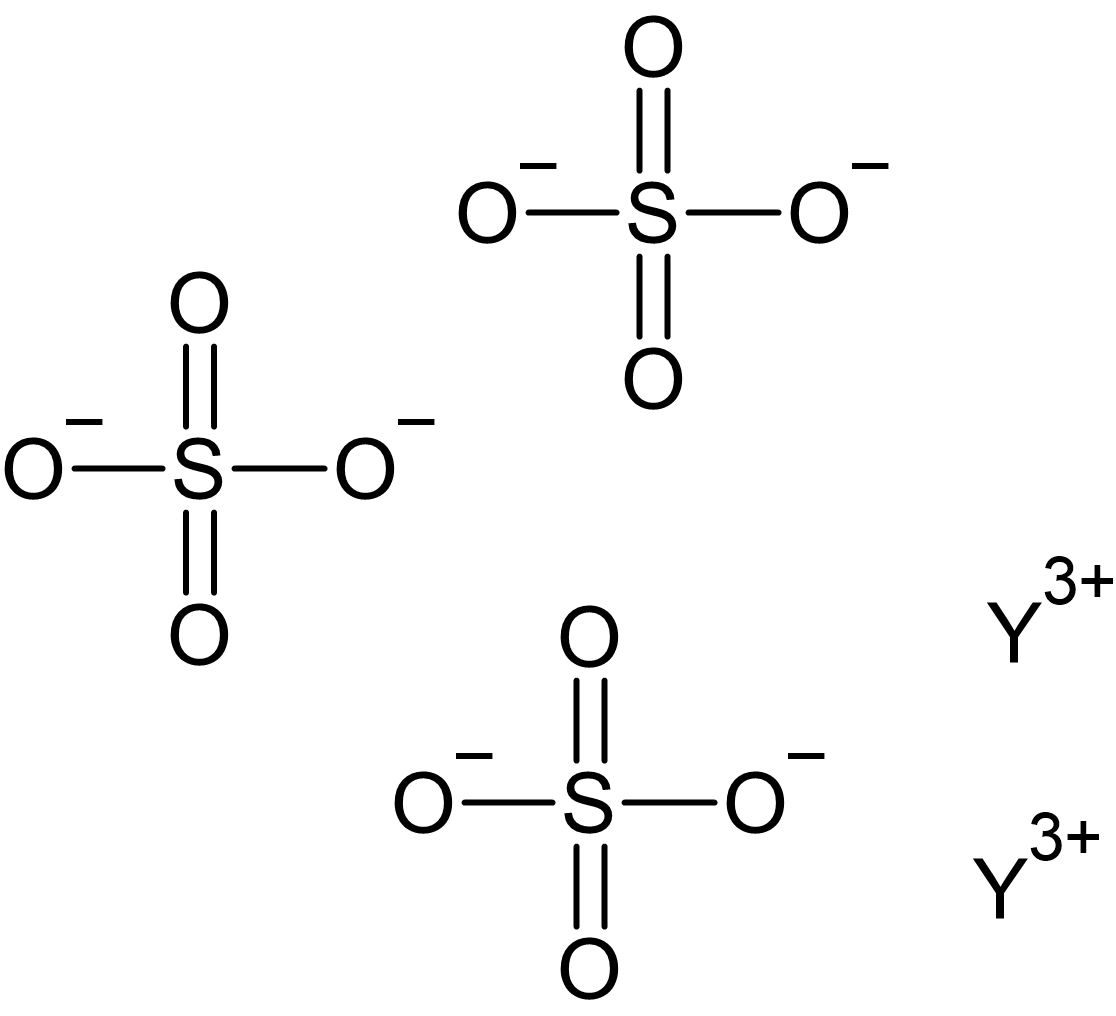

Names
- Other names Yttrium sesquisulfate Yttrium sulfate

Identifiers
CAS Number	13510-71-9 anhydrous; 7446-33-5 octahydrate
3D model (JSmol)	Interactive image
ChemSpider	145968
ECHA InfoCard	100.033.480
EC Number	236-844-3
PubChem CID	166836
CompTox Dashboard (EPA)	DTXSID00890706
- InChI: InChI=1S/3H2O4S.2Y/c3*1-5(2,3)4;;/h3*(H2,1,2,3,4);;/q;;;2*+3/p-6 Key: RTAYJOCWVUTQHB-UHFFFAOYSA-H
- SMILES: [O-]S(=O)(=O)[O-].[O-]S(=O)(=O)[O-].[O-]S(=O)(=O)[O-].[Y+3].[Y+3]

Properties
Chemical formula	Y_{2}(SO_{4})_{3}
Appearance	White solid
Solubility in water	Soluble

Hazards
- GHS labelling
Pictograms	(GHS07: Exclamation mark)
Signal word	Warning
Hazard statements	H315, H319, H335
Precautionary statements	P261, P264, P271, P280, P302+P352, P304+P340, P305+P351+P338, P312, P321, P332+P313, P337+P313, P362, P403+P233, P405, P501
- Except where otherwise noted, data are given for materials in their standard state (at 25 °C [77 °F], 100 kPa). Infobox references

Yttrium(III) sulfate is an inorganic compound with the formula Y_{2}(SO_{4})_{3}. The most common form is the anhydrate and octahydrate.

== Reactions ==
Yttrium sulfate can form double salts such as MY(SO_{4})_{2} and M_{3}Y(SO_{4})_{3}:

Y_{2}(SO_{4})_{3} + M_{2}SO_{4} → 2 MY(SO_{4})_{2}
Y_{2}(SO_{4})_{3} + 3 M_{2}SO_{4} → 2 M_{3}Y(SO_{4})_{3} (M = alkali metals)

== Synthesis ==
Yttrium(III) sulfate can be prepared using either corresponding oxide, hydroxide, or carbonate.

2 Y(OH)_{3} + 3 H_{2}SO_{4} → Y_{2}(SO_{4})_{3} + 6 H_{2}O
