= Americium(II) bromide =

Names
- IUPAC name Americium(II) bromide
- Other names Americium dibromide

Identifiers
CAS Number	39705-49-2
3D model (JSmol)	Interactive image
- InChI: InChI=1S/Am.2BrH/h;2*1H/q+2;;/p-2 Key: HSYWRKBZFLQIJZ-UHFFFAOYSA-L
- SMILES: [Br-].[Br-].[Am+2]

Properties
Chemical formula	AmBr_{2}
Molar mass	403 g·mol^{−1}

Related compounds
Other anions	Americium(II) chloride
- Except where otherwise noted, data are given for materials in their standard state (at 25 °C [77 °F], 100 kPa). Infobox references

Americium(II) bromide or americium dibromide is the chemical compound, a salt composed of an americium cation in the +2 oxidation state and 2 bromide ions in each formula unit, with the formula AmBr_{2}.

== Physical properties ==
It crystallises in the tetrahedral crystal system, different to americium dichloride. The dimensions of the unit cell are a = 11·592 and c = 7.121 Å.
