= Potassium perbromate =

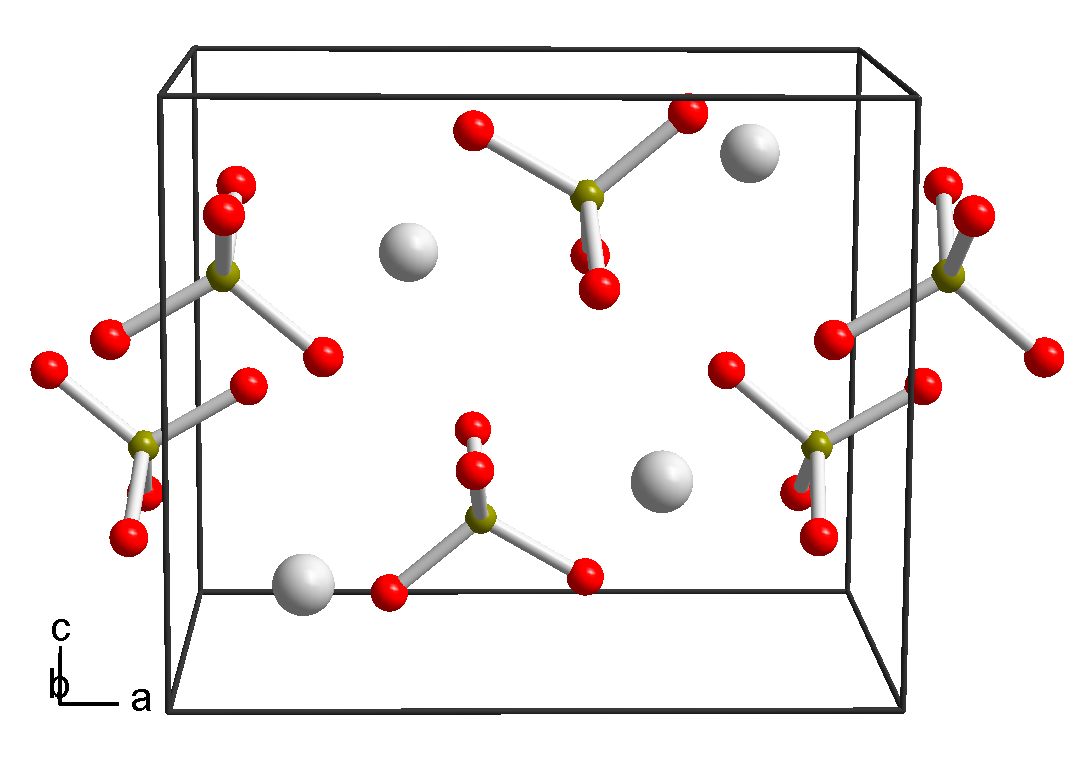
- ● K ● Br ● O

Names
- IUPAC name Potassium perbromate

Identifiers
CAS Number	22207-96-1
3D model (JSmol)	Interactive image
ChemSpider	9369771
PubChem CID	23682314
CompTox Dashboard (EPA)	DTXSID701336732
- InChI: InChI=1S/BrHO4.K/c2-1(3,4)5;/h(H,2,3,4,5);/q;+1/p-1 Key: VXLUZERCXISKBW-UHFFFAOYSA-M
- SMILES: [O-]Br(=O)(=O)=O.[K+]

Properties
Chemical formula	KBrO_{4}
Molar mass	182.998 g·mol^{−1}
Density	3.08 g/cm^{3}
- Except where otherwise noted, data are given for materials in their standard state (at 25 °C [77 °F], 100 kPa). Infobox references

Potassium perbromate is the chemical compound composed of the potassium ion and the perbromate ion, with the chemical formula KBrO_{4}.

== Preparation ==
Potassium perbromate can be prepared by reacting perbromic acid with potassium hydroxide:

HBrO_{4} + KOH → KBrO_{4} + H_{2}O
