= Tribromosilane =

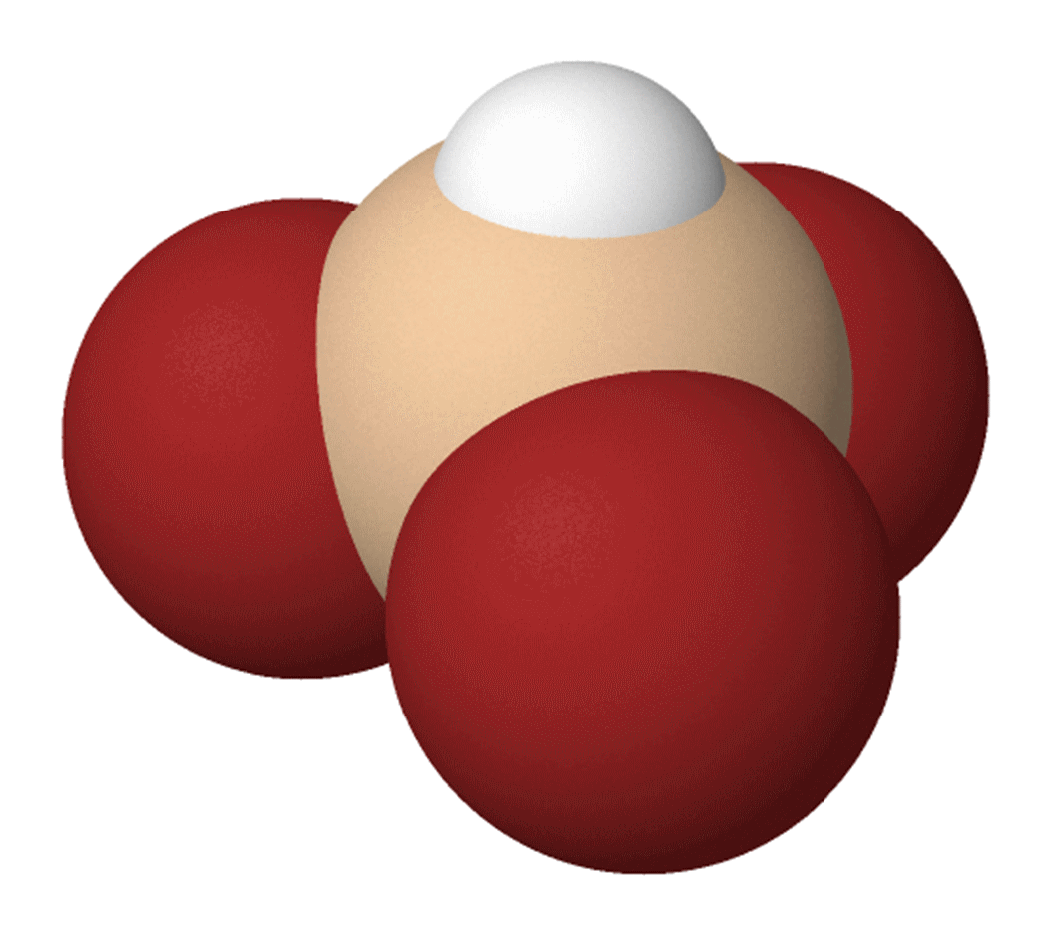

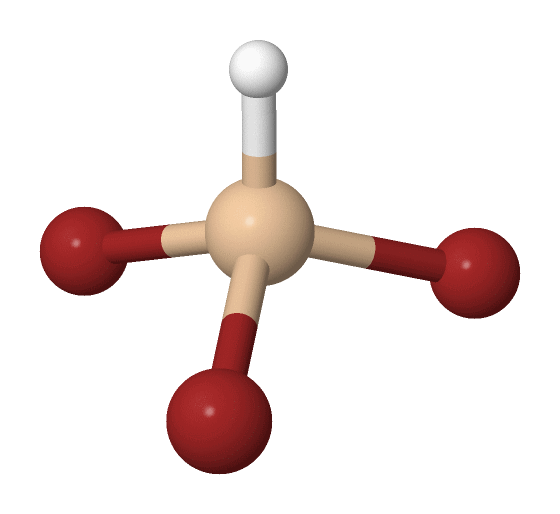

Names
- IUPAC name Tribromosilane
- Other names Silicobromoform; Tribromomonosilane

Identifiers
CAS Number	7789-57-3
3D model (JSmol)	Interactive image
ChemSpider	74222
ECHA InfoCard	100.029.250
PubChem CID	82244
UNII	H5DT3G5DA3
CompTox Dashboard (EPA)	DTXSID50160668
- InChI: InChI=1S/Br3HSi/c1-4(2)3/h4H
- SMILES: Br[SiH](Br)Br

Properties
Chemical formula	Br_{3}HSi
Molar mass	268.805 g·mol^{−1}
- Except where otherwise noted, data are given for materials in their standard state (at 25 °C [77 °F], 100 kPa). Infobox references

Tribromosilane is the chemical compound with the formula HBr_{3}Si. At high temperatures, it decomposes to produce silicon, and is an alternative to purified trichlorosilane of ultrapure silicon in the semiconductor industry.

The Schumacher Process of silicon deposition uses tribromosilane gas to produce polysilicon, but it has a number of cost and safety advantages over the Siemens Process to make polysilicon.

It may be prepared by heating crystalline silicon with gaseous hydrogen bromide at high temperature. It spontaneously combusts when exposed to air.
