= Holmium(III) telluride =

Identifiers
| CAS Number | 12162-61-7 |
| 3D model (JSmol) | Interactive image |
- InChI: InChI=1S/2Ho.3Te/q2*+3;3*-2 Key: XNNWQMLTXGTDMI-UHFFFAOYSA-N
- SMILES: [Ho+3].[Ho+3].[Te-2].[Te-2].[Te-2]

Properties
| Chemical formula | Ho_{2}Te_{3} |
| Molar mass | 712.66 g·mol^{−1} |
| Melting point | 1600 K |
- Except where otherwise noted, data are given for materials in their standard state (at 25 °C [77 °F], 100 kPa). Infobox references

Holmium(III) telluride is an inorganic compound, one of the tellurides of holmium, with the chemical formula Ho_{2}Te_{3}.

== Preparation ==
Holmium(III) telluride can be obtained by reacting tellurium and holmium in a stoichiometric ratio:

2 Ho + 3 Te → Ho_{2}Te_{3}

== Properties ==
Holmium(III) telluride can be dissolved in indium(III) telluride to form a solid solution containing HoInTe_{3} phase (peritectic temperature 890 K):

Ho_{2}Te_{3} + In_{2}Te_{3} → 2 HoInTe_{3}
