= Holmium acetylacetonate =

Names
- IUPAC name Tris(acetylacetonato)holmium(III)
- Systematic IUPAC name Tris[(Z)-4-oxopent-2-en-2-olato-κ^{2}O,O′]holmium(III)
- Other names Holmium(III) acetylacetonate

Identifiers
CAS Number	14589-33-4
3D model (JSmol)	Interactive image
ChemSpider	81131507
EC Number	804-943-6
PubChem CID	72727558
- InChI: InChI=1S/3C5H7O2.Ho/c3*1-4(6)3-5(2)7;/h3*3H,1-2H3;/q3*-1;+3 Key: UEKRGRZSLATUQV-UHFFFAOYSA-N
- SMILES: CC(=O)[CH-]C(=O)C.CC(=O)[CH-]C(=O)C.CC(=O)[CH-]C(=O)C.[Ho+3]

Properties
Chemical formula	C_{15}H_{21}HoO_{6}
Molar mass	462.257 g·mol^{−1}
Appearance	yellow-pink
Solubility in water	Insoluble
- Except where otherwise noted, data are given for materials in their standard state (at 25 °C [77 °F], 100 kPa). Infobox references

Holmium acetylacetonate is a coordination compound with the formula Ho(C_{5}H_{7}O_{2})_{3}. This anhydrous acetylacetonate complex is often discussed but unlikely to exist per se. The 8-coordinated dihydrate Ho(C_{5}H_{7}O_{2})_{3}(H_{2}O)_{2} is a more plausible formula based on the behavior of other lanthanide acetylacetonates. The dihydrate has been characterized by X-ray crystallography.

Attempts to dehydrate other lanthanide acetylacetonates result in decomposition.
