= Erbium iodate =

Identifiers
| CAS Number | 14723-96-7 anhydrous; 54172-09-7 dihydrate |
| 3D model (JSmol) | Interactive image |
| CompTox Dashboard (EPA) | DTXSID70163631 |
- InChI: InChI=1S/3HIO3.Er/c3*2-1(3)4;/h3*(H,2,3,4);/q;;;+3/p-3 Key: SJSQSCFANAWQCT-UHFFFAOYSA-K
- SMILES: [Er+3].O=I(=O)[O-].O=I(=O)[O-].O=I(=O)[O-]

Properties
| Chemical formula | Er(IO_{3})_{3} |
| Molar mass | 691.97 |
| Appearance | pale pink or orange crystals (anhydrous) pink or red crystals (dihydrate) |
| Density | 4.956 g·cm^{−3} (20 °C, dihydrate) |
- Except where otherwise noted, data are given for materials in their standard state (at 25 °C [77 °F], 100 kPa). Infobox references

Erbium iodate is an inorganic compound with the chemical formula Er(IO_{3})_{3}.

== Preparation ==
Erbium iodate can be obtained by reacting erbium periodate and periodic acid in water at 160 °C. The reaction will produce anhydrous and dihydrate crystals.

== Properties ==
Erbium iodate dihydrate is stable below 266 °C, loses two molecules of water at 289 °C, and decomposes at 589 °C to generate iodine and release oxygen.
