= Sodium perbromate =

Names
- IUPAC name Sodium perbromate

Identifiers
CAS Number	33497-30-2
3D model (JSmol)	Interactive image
ChemSpider	168096
PubChem CID	23697193
CompTox Dashboard (EPA)	DTXSID30187131
- InChI: InChI=1S/BrHO4.Na/c2-1(3,4)5;/h(H,2,3,4,5);/q;+1/p-1 Key: CLURAKRVQIPBCC-UHFFFAOYSA-M
- SMILES: [O-]Br(=O)(=O)=O.[Na+]

Properties
Chemical formula	NaBrO_{4}
Molar mass	166.89 g/mol
Density	2.57 g/cm^{3}
Melting point	266 °C
- Except where otherwise noted, data are given for materials in their standard state (at 25 °C [77 °F], 100 kPa). Infobox references

Sodium perbromate is the chemical compound composed of the sodium ion and the perbromate ion, with the chemical formula NaBrO_{4}.

== Preparation ==
Sodium perbromate can be prepared by reacting sodium bromate with fluorine and sodium hydroxide:

NaBrO_{3} + F_{2} + 2 NaOH → NaBrO_{4} + 2 NaF + H_{2}O

It can also be prepared by the oxidation of sodium bromate with xenon difluoride and water. NaBrO3 + XeF2 + H2O -> NaBrO4 + 2HF + Xe
