= Samarium(III) phosphate =

Identifiers
CAS Number	13465-57-1; monohydrate: 14913-18-9
3D model (JSmol)	Interactive image; monohydrate: Interactive image
ChemSpider	13931016
ECHA InfoCard	100.033.348
EC Number	236-698-0
PubChem CID	13710715; monohydrate: 16217379
CompTox Dashboard (EPA)	DTXSID10928706
- InChI: InChI=1S/H3O4P.Sm/c1-5(2,3)4;/h(H3,1,2,3,4);/q;+3/p-3 Key: BJRVEOKYZKROCC-UHFFFAOYSA-K; monohydrate: InChI=1S/H3O4P.H2O.Sm/c1-5(2,3)4;;/h(H3,1,2,3,4);1H2;/q;;+3/p-3 Key: GIUBLDXWAJRBHC-UHFFFAOYSA-K
- SMILES: [O-]P(=O)([O-])[O-].[Sm+3]; monohydrate: O.[O-]P(=O)([O-])[O-].[Sm+3]

Properties
Chemical formula	O_{4}PSm
Molar mass	245.33 g·mol^{−1}
Appearance	solid
Density	5.83 g·cm^{−3}
Solubility in water	insoluble
- Except where otherwise noted, data are given for materials in their standard state (at 25 °C [77 °F], 100 kPa). Infobox references

Samarium(III) phosphate is an inorganic compound, with the chemical formula of SmPO_{4}. It is one of the phosphates of samarium.

== Preparation ==
Samarium(III) phosphate can be obtained by reacting sodium metaphosphate with any soluble samarium(III) salt:

$$\mathsf{ SmCl_3 + NaPO_3  + H_2O \ \xrightarrow{}\ 2 SmPO_4\downarrow + NaCl + 2 HCl }$$

Samarium(III) phosphate can also be obtained by reacting phosphoric acid and samarium(III) chloride.

== Properties ==
Samarium(III) phosphate reacts with sodium fluoride at 750 °C to form Na_{2}SmF_{2}PO_{4}. Samarium(III) phosphate forms crystals of the monoclinic crystal system, with space group P2_{1}/n, and lattice parameters a = 0.6669 nm, b = 0.6868 nm, c = 0.6351 nm, β = 103.92 °, Z = 4.
