= Zirconium propionate =

Identifiers
CAS Number	25710-96-7
3D model (JSmol)	Interactive image
ChemSpider	7975962
EC Number	247-199-2
PubChem CID	9800197
- InChI: InChI=1S/4C3H6O2.Zr/c4*1-2-3(4)5;/h4*2H2,1H3,(H,4,5);/q;;;;+4/p-4 Key: RITQSUMSRSHZLF-UHFFFAOYSA-J
- SMILES: CCC(=O)[O-].CCC(=O)[O-].CCC(=O)[O-].CCC(=O)[O-].[Zr+4]

Properties
Chemical formula	C_{12}H_{20}O_{8}Zr
Molar mass	383.508 g·mol^{−1}

Hazards
- GHS labelling
Pictograms	(GHS07: Exclamation mark)
Signal word	Warning
Hazard statements	H315, H319
Precautionary statements	P264, P280, P302+P352, P305+P351+P338, P321, P332+P313, P337+P313, P362
- Except where otherwise noted, data are given for materials in their standard state (at 25 °C [77 °F], 100 kPa). Infobox references

Zirconium propionate is an ill-defined compound containing propionate and zirconium(IV). It is not soluble in water, but dissolves in isopropanol, ethanol and ethyl acetate. When tamped or untamped, it has a density of 1.14 g/cm^{3} or 0.98 g/cm^{3} respectively. It is used to promote adhesion in solvent-based inks.
