= Holmium disilicide =

Names
- Other names Holmium silicide, holmium(II) silicide

Identifiers
CAS Number	12136-24-2
3D model (JSmol)	Interactive image
ChemSpider	129556649
EC Number	235-226-0
PubChem CID	102601513
- InChI: InChI=1S/Ho.Si2/c;1-2 Key: UZIXUMDZCLDXCV-UHFFFAOYSA-N
- SMILES: [Si]#[Si].[Ho]

Properties
Chemical formula	HoSi_{2}
Molar mass	221.100 g·mol^{−1}
Appearance	dark gray cristals
Density	7.1 g/cm^{3}

Structure
Crystal structure	Hexagonal
- Except where otherwise noted, data are given for materials in their standard state (at 25 °C [77 °F], 100 kPa). Infobox references

Holmium disilicide is a binary inorganic compound of holmium and silicon with the chemical formula HoSi_{2}. It belongs to the class of rare-earth metal silicides, which are widely studied for their unique electronic, magnetic, and thermal properties. These materials find niche applications in semiconductor technology, high-temperature alloys, and solid-state physics.

== Synthesis ==
Holmium disilicide is typically synthesized using high-temperature methods. Elemental holmium and silicon are mixed and heated under inert atmosphere (e.g., argon) at temperatures above 1000 °C.

== Physical properties ==
The compound typically appears as a dark gray or black metallic powder or crystalline solid, depending on synthesis method and purity. HoSi_{2} exhibits a hexagonal crystal structure, space group P6/mmm.

== Uses ==
While not widely used in commercial applications, holmium disilicide is of interest in several specialized fields. It is studied for its magnetic phase transitions and electronic structure, especially in relation to other heavy rare-earth silicides. It is also investigated for thermoelectric potential, where its layered structure may enable efficient heat-to-electricity conversion. It is also considered for use in high-temperature contacts and silicide-based gate electrodes in microelectronics due to its stability and conductivity.
