= Promethium(III) phosphate =

promethium(III) phosphate

Identifiers
| CAS Number | 14014-68-7 |
| 3D model (JSmol) | Interactive image |
| PubChem CID | 159478665 (charge error) |
- InChI: InChI=1S/H3O4P.Pm/c1-5(2,3)4;/h(H3,1,2,3,4);/q;+3/p-3 Key: LWSFGPKHSQZZME-UHFFFAOYSA-K
- SMILES: [O-]P(=O)([O-])[O-].[Pm+3]

Properties
| Chemical formula | PmPO_{4} |
| Molar mass | 241.89 |
| Appearance | pale yellow solid (hydrate) garnet-red solid (anhydride) |
| Solubility in water | insoluble |
- Except where otherwise noted, data are given for materials in their standard state (at 25 °C [77 °F], 100 kPa). Infobox references

Promethium(III) phosphate is an inorganic compound, a salt of promethium and phosphate, with the chemical formula of PmPO_{4}. It is radioactive. Its hydrate can be obtained by precipitation of soluble promethium salt and diammonium hydrogen phosphate at pH 3~4 (or obtained by hydrothermal reaction), and the hydrate can be obtained by burning at 960 °C to obtain the anhydrous form. Its standard enthalpy of formation is −464 kcal/mol.
