= Neodymium perrhenate =

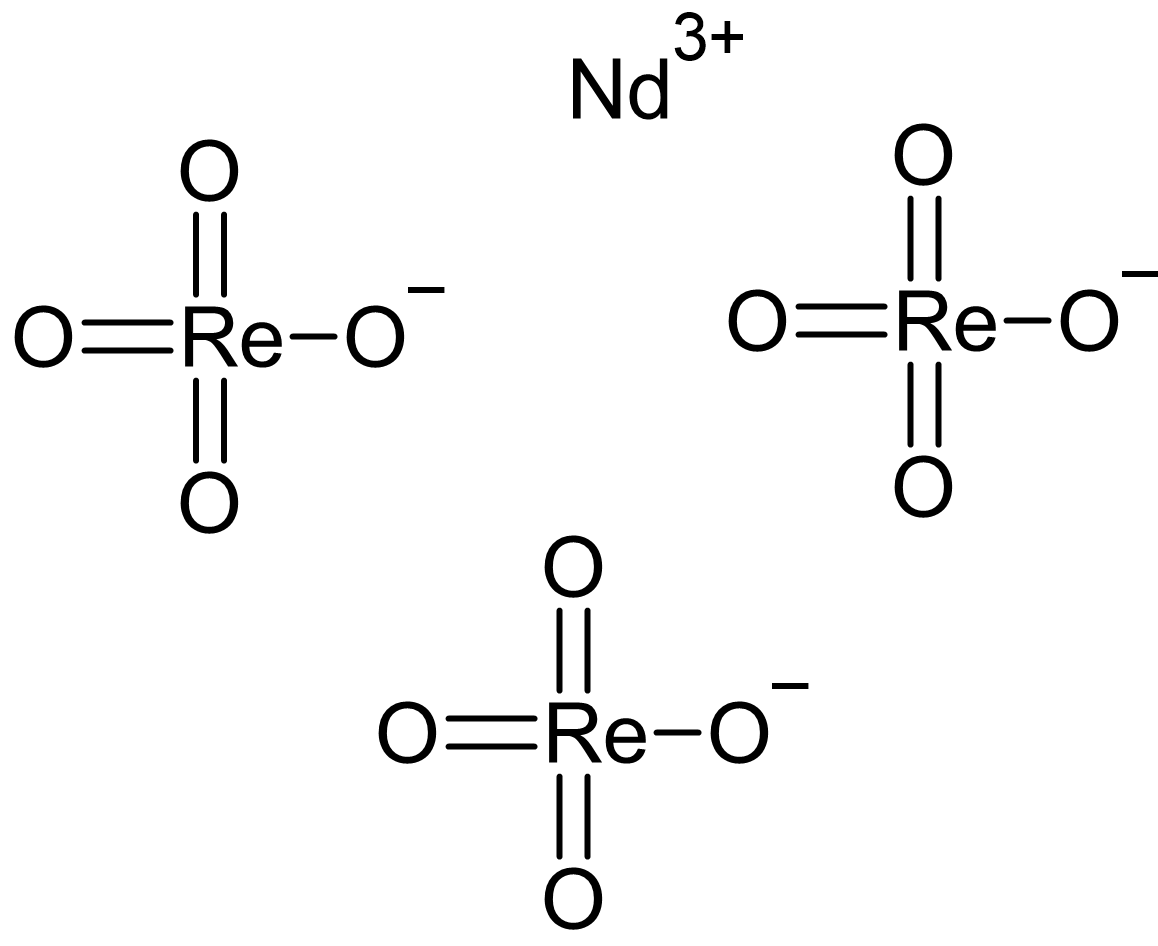

Identifiers
CAS Number	14020-41-8 anhydrate; 18222-80-5 tetrahydrate
3D model (JSmol)	Interactive image
- InChI: InChI=1S/Nd.12O.3Re/q+3;;;;;;;;;;3*-1;;; Key: YWVGJWGZZGKVIR-UHFFFAOYSA-N
- SMILES: [Nd+3].[O-][Re](=O)(=O)=O.[O-][Re](=O)(=O)=O.[O-][Re](=O)(=O)=O

Properties
Chemical formula	Nd(ReO_{4})_{3}
Solubility in water	soluble
- Except where otherwise noted, data are given for materials in their standard state (at 25 °C [77 °F], 100 kPa). Infobox references

Neodymium perrhenate is an inorganic compound with the chemical formula Nd(ReO_{4})_{3}, which exists in anhydrous and tetrahydrate. It can be obtained by reacting excess neodymium oxide with 240 g/L perrhenic acid solution. In its solution, NdReO_{4}^{2+} and Nd(ReO_{4})^{2+} can be observed with stability constants of 16.5 and 23.6, respectively.

Nd_{4}Re_{6}O_{19} can be obtained by reacting neodymium perrhenate and NdRe_{2} at high temperature.

== See also ==
- Neodymium
- Rhenium
- Perrhenate
