= Holmium diantimonide =

Identifiers
CAS Number	12437-29-5
3D model (JSmol)	Interactive image
ChemSpider	57533921
PubChem CID	71351921
CompTox Dashboard (EPA)	DTXSID10777256
- InChI: InChI=1S/Ho.2Sb Key: DGGBEOWDICCTET-UHFFFAOYSA-N
- SMILES: [Sb].[Sb].[Ho]

Properties
Chemical formula	HoSb_{2}
Molar mass	408.450 g·mol^{−1}
Density	8.94 g·cm^{−3}

Thermochemistry
Std enthalpy of formation (Δ_{f}H^{⦵}_{298})	−74 kJ·mol^{−1}
- Except where otherwise noted, data are given for materials in their standard state (at 25 °C [77 °F], 100 kPa). Infobox references

Holmium diantimonide is an inorganic compound with the chemical formula HoSb_{2}. It is one of the antimonides of holmium. It can be obtained by reacting holmium and antimony at a certain temperature (1000~1500 °C) and pressure (30~65 kbar). X-ray diffraction shows its space group C222, unit cell parameters a=3.343 Å, b=5.790 Å, c=7.840 Å, Z=2.

HoSb_{2} is also the crystal structure prototype of some compounds. Compounds belonging to the HoSb_{2} structure include LuSb_{2}, YSb_{2}, etc.
