= Holmium iodate =

Identifiers
CAS Number	23340-47-8 anhydrous; 24859-42-5 tetrahydrate
3D model (JSmol)	Interactive image
ChemSpider	20082500
EC Number	245-593-9
PubChem CID	21149397
CompTox Dashboard (EPA)	DTXSID20177900
- InChI: InChI=1S/Ho.3HIO3/c;3*2-1(3)4/h;3*(H,2,3,4)/q+3;;;/p-3 Key: RZAVVMZWGQFLIE-UHFFFAOYSA-K
- SMILES: [O-]I(=O)=O.[O-]I(=O)=O.[O-]I(=O)=O.[Ho+3]

Properties
Chemical formula	Ho(IO_{3})_{3}
Molar mass	689.64
Appearance	pink solid
- Except where otherwise noted, data are given for materials in their standard state (at 25 °C [77 °F], 100 kPa). Infobox references

Holmium iodate is an inorganic compound with the chemical formula Ho(IO_{3})_{3}. It can be obtained by reacting holmium periodate and periodic acid in water at 170 °C. Its solubility in water is 1.162±0.001 (25 °C, 103 mol·dm^{−3}). Adding ethanol or methanol to water will reduce the solubility.
