= Sodium hexafluorotitanate =

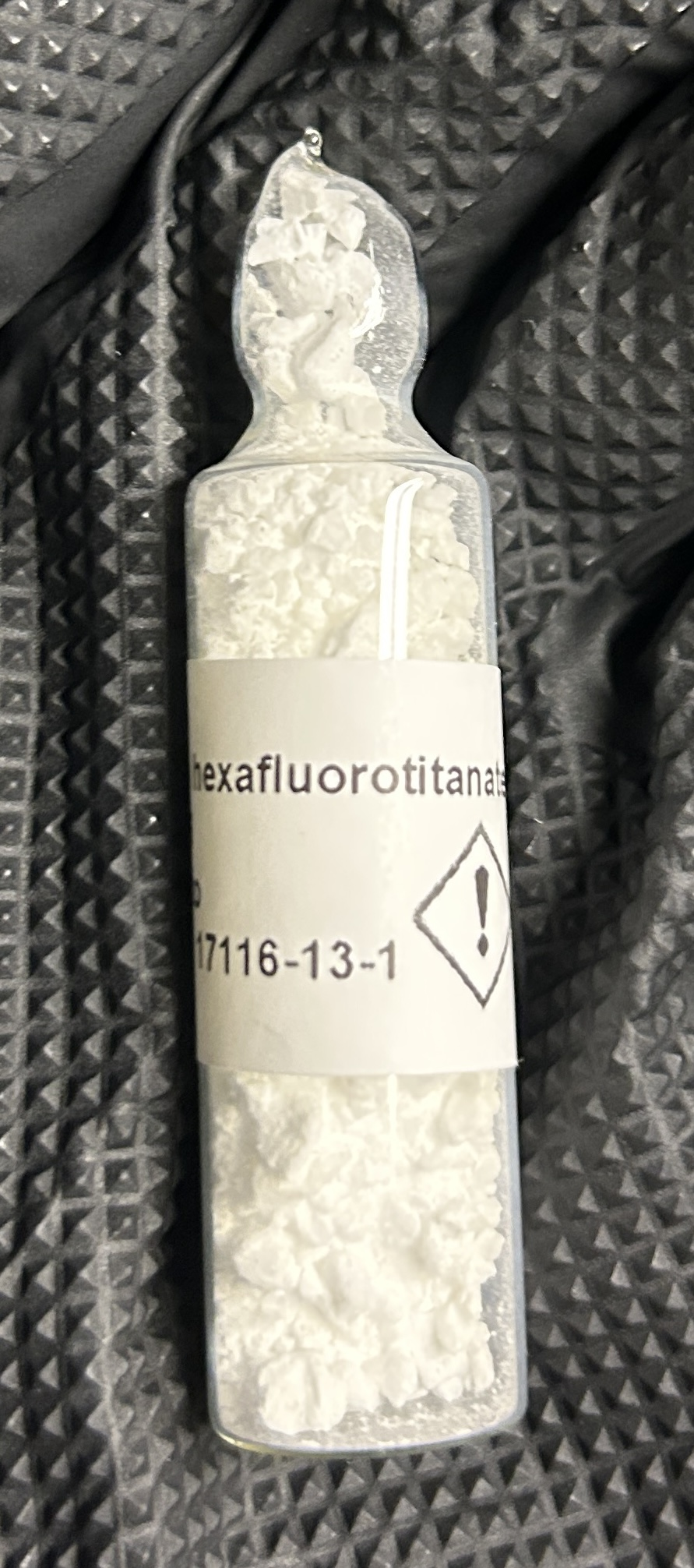
- Sodium hexafluorotitanate in a sealed ampoule

Names
- IUPAC name disodium; hexafluorotitanium(2-)
- Other names Disodium hexafluorotitanate, sodium fluotitanate(IV), sodium titanium fluoride

Identifiers
CAS Number	17116-13-1
3D model (JSmol)	Interactive image
ChemSpider	11221766
EC Number	241-181-8
PubChem CID	44717630
- InChI: InChI=1S/6FH.2Na.Ti/h6*1H;;;/q;;;;;;2*+1;+4/p-6 Key: HLJCWGPUCQTHFY-UHFFFAOYSA-H
- SMILES: [Na+].[Na+].F[Ti-2](F)(F)(F)(F)F

Properties
Chemical formula	F_{6}Na_{2}Ti
Molar mass	207.837 g·mol^{−1}
Appearance	White powder
Melting point	146–156 °C (295–313 °F; 419–429 K)
Solubility in water	soluble

Hazards
- GHS labelling
Pictograms	(GHS05: Corrosive) (GHS07: Exclamation mark)
Signal word	Warning
Hazard statements	H315, H319, H335
Precautionary statements	P233, P262, P280, P304, P305, P338, P340, P351, P403, P501
- Except where otherwise noted, data are given for materials in their standard state (at 25 °C [77 °F], 100 kPa). Infobox references

Sodium hexafluorotitanate is an inorganic compound of sodium, fluorine, and titanium with the chemical formula Na_{2}TiF_{6}.

== Physical properties ==
The compound forms white powder. It is mostly air and moisture stable, but forms small amounts of hydrofluoric acid (HF) on contact with moisture. It is soluble in water, forming a corrosive solution.

== Hazards identification ==
The compound is severely irritating to skin, eyes, and respiratory tract. If it is inhaled or swallowed, the compound may cause fluoride poisoning.
