= Erbium(III) selenate =

erbium(III) selenate

Identifiers
CAS Number	anhydrous: 20148-60-1; octahydrate: 26299-44-5
3D model (JSmol)	anhydrous: Interactive image; octahydrate: Interactive image
PubChem CID	anhydrous: 154726256; octahydrate: 154704137
- InChI: InChI=1S/2Er.3H2O4Se/c;;3*1-5(2,3)4/h;;3*(H2,1,2,3,4)/q2*+3;;;/p-6 Key: MOBNMXCYOYNHIL-UHFFFAOYSA-H; octahydrate: InChI=1S/2Er.3H2O4Se.8H2O/c;;3*1-5(2,3)4;;;;;;;;/h;;3*(H2,1,2,3,4);8*1H2/q2*+3;;;;;;;;;;;/p-6 Key: XXAGZLDPUWOOJR-UHFFFAOYSA-H
- SMILES: anhydrous: [O-][Se](=O)(=O)[O-].[O-][Se](=O)(=O)[O-].[O-][Se](=O)(=O)[O-].[Er+3].[Er+3]; octahydrate: O.O.O.O.O.O.O.O.[O-][Se](=O)(=O)[O-].[O-][Se](=O)(=O)[O-].[O-][Se](=O)(=O)[O-].[Er+3].[Er+3]

Properties
Chemical formula	Er_{2}O_{12}Se_{3}
Molar mass	763.419 g·mol^{−1}
- Except where otherwise noted, data are given for materials in their standard state (at 25 °C [77 °F], 100 kPa). Infobox references

Erbium(III) selenate is an inorganic compound, with the chemical formula Er_{2}(SeO_{4})_{3}. It exists as an anhydrate or an octahydrate.

== Preparation and properties ==
Monoclinic erbium(III) selenate octahydrate can be crystallized from the solution when dissolving erbium oxide in selenic acid:

Er_{2}O_{3} + 3 H_{2}SeO_{4} + 5 H_{2}O → Er_{2}(SeO_{4})_{3}·_{8}H_{2}O

Erbium(III) selenate octahydrate is first dehydrated by heating to obtain the anhydrous form, and then heated continuously to obtain erbium selenite and finally erbium(III) oxide.

It can crystallize with M_{2}SeO_{4} in aqueous solution to form double salts, such as K_{3}Er(SeO_{4})_{3}·nH_{2}O and NH_{4}Er(SeO_{4})_{2}·3H_{2}O, etc.
