= Copper(II) telluride =

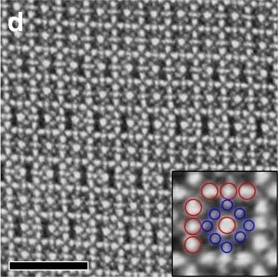
- TEM image of CuTe viewed along the a axis. Red and blue circles mark Te and Cu.

Names
- IUPAC name Copper(II) telluride

Identifiers
| CAS Number | 12019-23-7 |
| 3D model (JSmol) | Interactive image |
| ChemSpider | 74722 |
| ECHA InfoCard | 100.031.482 |
| EC Number | 234-644-0 |
| PubChem CID | 82801 |
| CompTox Dashboard (EPA) | DTXSID50893166 |
- InChI: InChI=1S/Cu.Te Key: QZCHKAUWIRYEGK-UHFFFAOYSA-N
- SMILES: [Cu]=[Te]

Properties
| Chemical formula | CuTe |
| Molar mass | 191.15 g/mol |
| Appearance | Yellow crystals |
| Density | 7.09 g/cm^{3} |
| Solubility in water | insoluble |

Structure
| Crystal structure | Orthorhombic), oP4 |
| Space group | Pmmn (No. 59) |
| Lattice constant | a = 0.315 nm, b = 0.409 nm, c = 0.695 nm |
| Formula units (Z) | 2 |
- Except where otherwise noted, data are given for materials in their standard state (at 25 °C [77 °F], 100 kPa). Infobox references

Copper(II) telluride is an inorganic compound with the chemical formula CuTe that occurs in nature as a rare mineral vulcanite.
