= Vanadium chloride =

Vanadium chloride may refer to:

- Vanadium(II) chloride, VCl_{2}
- Vanadium(III) chloride, VCl_{3}
- Vanadium(IV) chloride, VCl_{4}
- Vanadium(V) chloride, VCl_{5}
