= Vanadium fluoride =

Vanadium fluoride may refer to:

- Vanadium(II) fluoride (vanadium difluoride), VF_{2}
- Vanadium(III) fluoride (vanadium trifluoride), VF_{3}
- Vanadium(IV) fluoride (vanadium tetrafluoride), VF_{4}
- Vanadium(V) fluoride (vanadium pentafluoride), VF_{5}
