= Vanadium bromide =

Vanadium bromide may refer to:

- Vanadium(II) bromide (vanadium dibromide), VBr_{2}
- Vanadium(III) bromide (vanadium tribromide), VBr_{3}
