= Titanium(II) chloride =

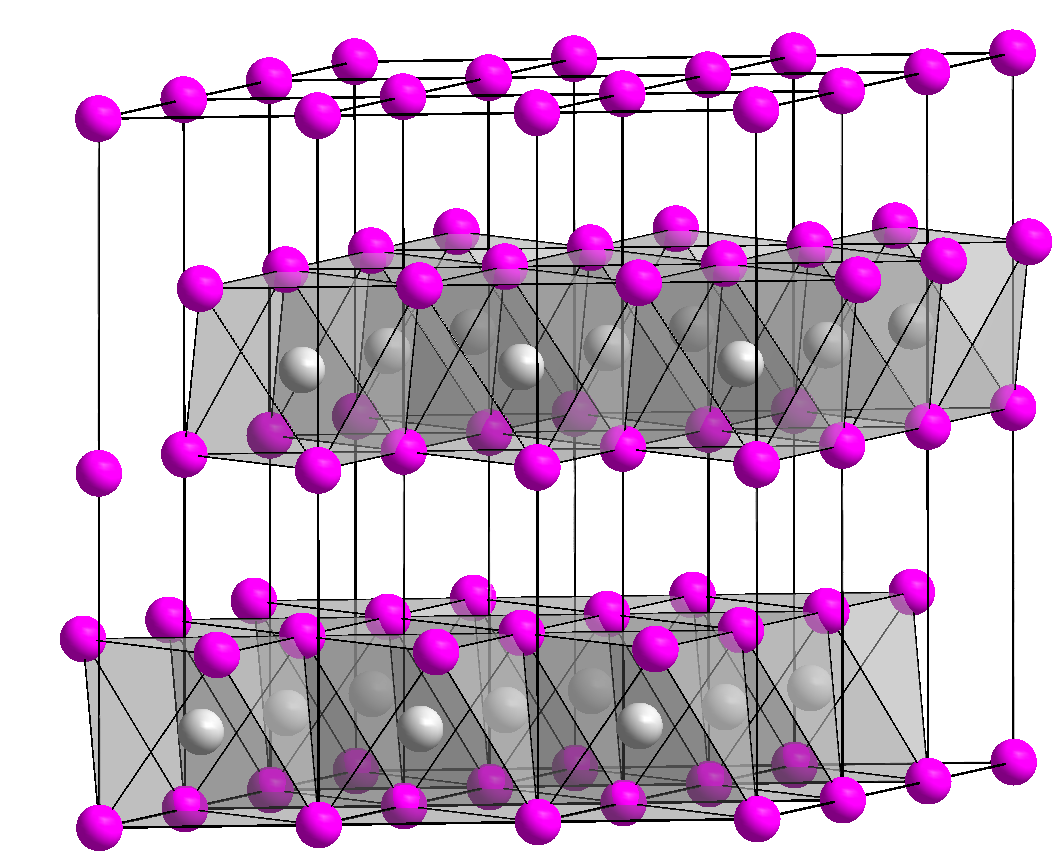

Identifiers
CAS Number	10049-06-6
3D model (JSmol)	Interactive image
ChemSpider	8466246
ECHA InfoCard	100.030.137
EC Number	233-164-9
PubChem CID	66228
UNII	BK26WI342Q
CompTox Dashboard (EPA)	DTXSID3064930
- InChI: InChI=1S/2ClH.Ti/h2*1H;/q;;+2/p-2 Key: ZWYDDDAMNQQZHD-UHFFFAOYSA-L; InChI=1/2ClH.Ti/h2*1H;/q;;+2/p-2 Key: ZWYDDDAMNQQZHD-NUQVWONBAH
- SMILES: [Ti+2].[Cl-].[Cl-]

Properties
Chemical formula	Cl_{2}Ti
Molar mass	118.77 g·mol^{−1}
Appearance	black hexagonal crystals
Density	3.13 g/cm^{3}
Melting point	1,035 °C (1,895 °F; 1,308 K)
Boiling point	1,500 °C (2,730 °F; 1,770 K)
Magnetic susceptibility (χ)	+570.0·10^{−6} cm^{3}/mol

Hazards
- Occupational safety and health (OHS/OSH)
Main hazards	pyrophoric
- GHS labelling
Pictograms	(GHS02: Flammable) (GHS05: Corrosive)
Signal word	Danger
Hazard statements	H250, H314
Precautionary statements	P210, P222, P260, P264, P280, P301+P330+P331, P302+P334, P303+P361+P353, P304+P340, P305+P351+P338, P310, P363, P370+P378, P405, P422
Safety data sheet (SDS)	External MSDS
- Except where otherwise noted, data are given for materials in their standard state (at 25 °C [77 °F], 100 kPa). verify (what is ?) Infobox references

Titanium(II) chloride is the chemical compound with the formula TiCl_{2}. The black solid has been studied only moderately, probably because of its high reactivity. Ti(II) is a strong reducing agent: it has a high affinity for oxygen and reacts irreversibly with water to produce H_{2}. The usual preparation is the thermal disproportionation of TiCl_{3} at 500 °C. The reaction is driven by the loss of volatile TiCl_{4}:

2 TiCl_{3} → TiCl_{2} + TiCl_{4}

The method is similar to that for the conversion of VCl_{3} into VCl_{2} and VCl_{4}.

TiCl_{2} crystallizes as the layered CdI_{2} structure. Thus, the Ti(II) centers are octahedrally coordinated to six chloride ligands.

== Derivatives ==
Molecular complexes are known such as TiCl_{2}(chel)_{2}, where chel is DMPE (CH_{3})_{2}PCH_{2}CH_{2}P(CH_{3})_{2} and TMEDA ((CH_{3})_{2}NCH_{2}CH_{2}N(CH_{3})_{2}). Such species are prepared by reduction of related Ti(III) and Ti(IV) complexes.

Unusual electronic effects have been observed in these species: TiCl_{2}[(CH_{3})_{2}PCH_{2}CH_{2}P(CH_{3})_{2}]_{2} is paramagnetic with a triplet ground state, but Ti(CH_{3})_{2}[(CH_{3})_{2}PCH_{2}CH_{2}P(CH_{3})_{2}]_{2} is diamagnetic.

A solid-state derivative of TiCl_{2} is Na_{2}TiCl_{4}, which has been prepared by the reaction of Ti metal with TiCl_{3} in a NaCl flux. This species adopts a linear chain structure wherein again the Ti(II) centers are octahedral with terminal, axial halides.
