= Vanadium(V) chloride chlorimide =

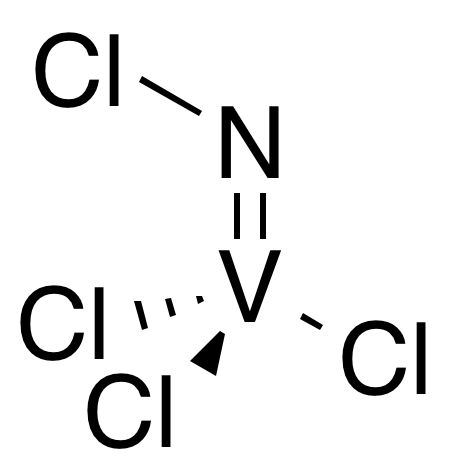

Identifiers
CAS Number	14989-38-9
3D model (JSmol)	Interactive image
ChemSpider	129557751
- InChI: InChI=1S/ClN.3ClH.V/c1-2;;;;/h;3*1H;/q;;;;+3/p-3 Key: SNGARBHUIAVTIM-UHFFFAOYSA-K
- SMILES: ClN=[V](Cl)(Cl)Cl

Properties
Chemical formula	Cl_{4}NV
Molar mass	206.75 g·mol^{−1}
Density	2.48 g/cm^{3}
Melting point	136 °C (277 °F; 409 K)
log P	2.94160

Related compounds
Other anions	VOCl_{3}; VCl_{5}; Cl_{3}VNBr; Cl_{3}VNI
Other cations	ReNCl_{4}
- Except where otherwise noted, data are given for materials in their standard state (at 25 °C [77 °F], 100 kPa). Infobox references

Vanadium (V) chloride chlorimide is a chemical compound containing vanadium in a +5 oxidation state bound to three chlorine atoms and with a double bond to a chlorimide group (=NCl). It has formula VNCl_{4}. This can be also considered as a chloroiminato complex.

== Production ==
Vanadium(V) chloride chlorimide can be made by chlorinating vanadium nitride at 120°. Or chlorine azide can react with vanadium tetrachloride to yield it. Or more conveniently it can be made by heating vanadium tetrachloride with sodium azide and chlorine gas.

== Properties ==
The melting point of Vanadium(V) chloride chlorimide is 136 °C. It can be sublimed in a vacuum below its melting point. The density of the solid is 2.48 g/cm^{3}. The solid has a triclinic crystal structure with unit cell a=7.64, b=7.14, c=5.91 Å; α=112.4°, β=94.9°, γ=107.8° with Z=2 (formulas per unit cell). The space group is P1̅.

Vanadium(V) chloride chlorimide is molecular. In the gas phase the V to N bond length is 1.651 Å, V to Cl bond length is 2.138 Å, N to Cl bond length is 1.597 Å. The bond angles are ∠ClVCl 113.4°, VNCl 169.7 and ∠NVCl 106.0.

In the solid form, the bond lengths are slightly different. V-Cl: 2.20, 2.30 and 2.38 Å, V=N bond is 1.64 Å long and N-Cl length is 1.59 Å. The VNC angle is 175.2°.

== Reactions ==
VCl_{3}NCl can crystallise with antimony pentachloride. Phosphines and nitrogen bases can form complexes with the vanadium in this compound. (triphenyl phosphine, tributyl phosphine, pyridine, bipyridine). A reaction with ammonium chloride yields the [Cl_{5}VNCl]^{2−} ion.
