= Titanium fluoride =

Titanium fluoride can refer to

- Titanium(III) fluoride (titanium trifluoride, TiF_{3}), a violet to purple-red solid
- Titanium tetrafluoride (TiF_{4}), a white hygroscopic solid with polymeric structure
