= Vanadium(II) iodide =

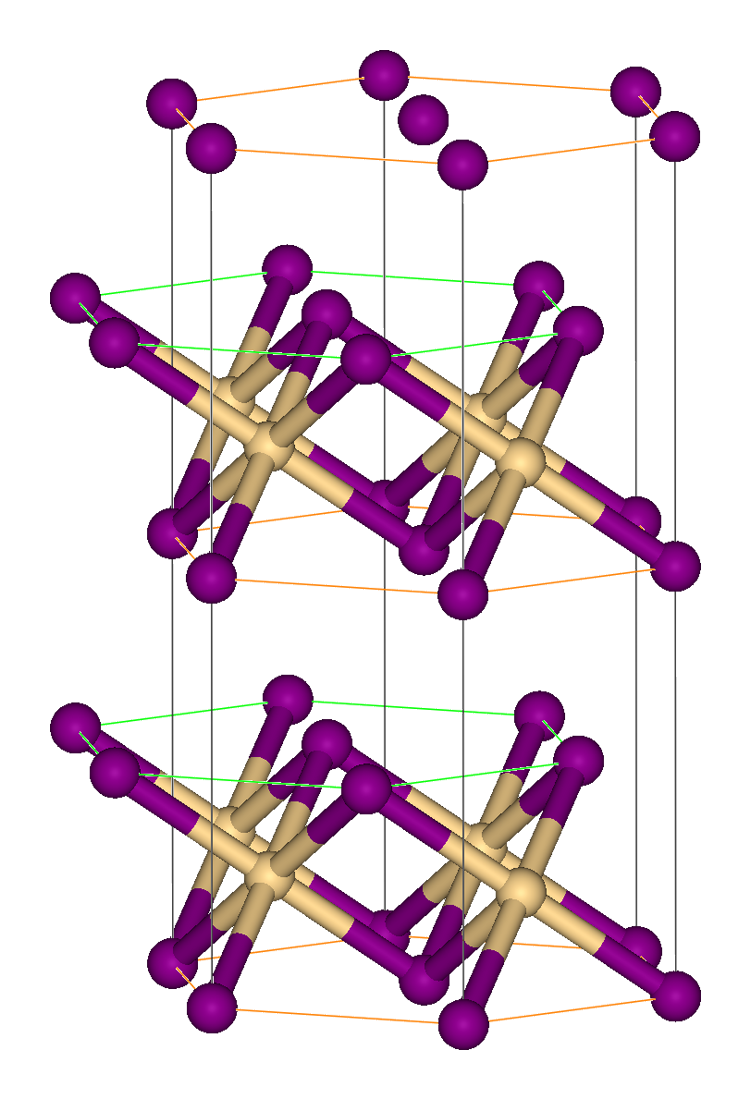

Identifiers
CAS Number	15513-84-5
3D model (JSmol)	Interactive image
ChemSpider	76640
ECHA InfoCard	100.035.935
EC Number	239-545-6
PubChem CID	84959
CompTox Dashboard (EPA)	DTXSID40935145
- InChI: InChI=1S/2HI.V/h2*1H;/q;;+2/p-2 Key: OJFNQCZRUJTCOZ-UHFFFAOYSA-L
- SMILES: [V+2].[I-].[I-]

Properties
Chemical formula	VI_{2}
Appearance	black mica-like
Density	5.44 g/cm^{3}
Melting point	750–800 °C (1,380–1,470 °F; 1,020–1,070 K) (sublimes)

Related compounds
Other anions	Vanadium(II) chloride; Vanadium(II) bromide
Related compounds	Vanadium(III) iodide
- Except where otherwise noted, data are given for materials in their standard state (at 25 °C [77 °F], 100 kPa). Infobox references

Vanadium(II) iodide is the inorganic compound with the formula VI_{2}. It is a black micaceous solid. It adopts the cadmium iodide structure, featuring octahedral V(II) centers. The hexahydrate [V(H_{2}O)_{6}]I_{2}, an aquo complex, is also known. It forms red-violet crystals. The hexahydrate dehydrates under vacuum to give a red-brown tetrahydrate with the formula V(H_{2}O)_{4}I_{2}.

== Preparation ==
The original synthesis of VI_{2} involved reaction of the elements.

Solvated vanadium(II) iodides can be prepared by reduction of vanadium(III) chlorides with trimethylsilyl iodide. It reacts with anhydrous ammonia to give the hexaammine complex.
