= Ammonium hexafluorovanadate =

Names
- IUPAC name Ammonium hexafluorovanadate
- Other names: Ammonium hexafluorovanadate(III); Triammonium vanadium hexafluoride

Identifiers
CAS Number	13815-31-1
3D model (JSmol)	Interactive image
ChemSpider	19995865
PubChem CID	129647085
- InChI: InChI=1S/6FH.3 H3N.V/h6*1H;3*1 H3;/p-3 Key: PURSFTZXXIKJST-UHFFFAOYSA-K
- SMILES: [F-].[F-].[F-].[F-].[F-] .[F-].[V].[NH4+].[NH 4+].[NH4+]

Properties
Chemical formula	F_{6}H_{12}N_{3}V
Molar mass	219.049 g·mol^{−1}
Appearance	green solid
- Except where otherwise noted, data are given for materials in their standard state (at 25 °C [77 °F], 100 kPa). Infobox references

Ammonium hexafluorovanadate is an inorganic chemical compound with the chemical formula (NH_{4})_{3}VF_{6}.

== Synthesis ==
Ammonium hexafluorovanadate can be prepared the solid state reaction of vanadium trioxide and ammonium bifluoride. Another method involves the solid state reaction of vanadium(III) fluoride with ammonium fluoride.

== Reactions ==
The compound decomposes to vanadium pentoxide if heated in open air:

4(NH_{4})_{3}VF_{6} + 11O_{2} → 2V_{2}O_{5} + 6N_{2} + 12H_{2}O + 24HF

== Related compounds ==
An ammonium hexafluorovanadate(V) with the formula NH_{4}VF_{6} has been reported.
