= VF4 =

VF4 can refer to

- Vanadium(IV) fluoride, a chemical compound with a formula VF_{4}
- Virtua Fighter 4, a video game
