= VF2 =

VF2 may refer to:

- Vanadium(II) fluoride, chemical formula VF_{2}
- vf2 algorithm, for graph isomorphism
- Virtua Fighter 2, a 1994 fighting video game
