= VF5 =

VF5 or VF_{5} may refer to:

- Virtua Fighter 5, a fighting game
- Vanadium(V) fluoride, a chemical compound
- Fighting Squadron 5 (VF-5), an aviation unit of the United States Navy
