= Titanium(III) bromide =

Names
- IUPAC name Titanium(III) bromide
- Other names Titanium tribromide Tribromotitanium

Identifiers
CAS Number	13135-31-4
3D model (JSmol)	Interactive image
ChemSpider	120705
PubChem CID	136975
CompTox Dashboard (EPA)	DTXSID601045966
- InChI: InChI=1S/3BrH.Ti/h3*1H;/q;;;+3/p-3 Key: MTAYDNKNMILFOK-UHFFFAOYSA-K
- SMILES: [Ti](Br)(Br)Br

Properties
Chemical formula	TiBr_{3}
Molar mass	287.579 g/mol
Appearance	blue-black solid

Hazards
NFPA 704 (fire diamond)	0 0 0

Related compounds
Other anions	Titanium(III) chloride Titanium(III) fluoride
Related compounds	Titanium(IV) bromide
- Except where otherwise noted, data are given for materials in their standard state (at 25 °C [77 °F], 100 kPa). Infobox references

Titanium(III) bromide is the inorganic compound with the formula TiBr_{3}. It is a blue black paramagnetic solid with a reddish reflection. It has few applications, although it is a catalyst for the polymerization of alkenes.

== Production and structure ==
TiBr_{3} can be produced by heating the tetrabromide in an atmosphere of hydrogen:

2 TiBr_{4} + H_{2} → 2 TiBr_{3} + 2 HBr

It can also be produced by comproportionation of titanium metal and titanium tetrabromide.

Ti + 3 TiBr_{4} → 4 TiBr_{3}

Two polymorphs of TiBr_{3} are known, each exhibiting octahedral Ti centers.

== Reactions ==
Heating the tribromide gives titanium(II) bromide together with the volatile tetrabromide:

2 TiBr_{3} → TiBr_{4} + TiBr_{2}

The solid dissolves in donor solvents (L) such as pyridine and nitriles to produce 3:1 adducts:

TiBr_{3} + 3 L → TiBr_{3}L_{3}
