= Ammonium hexafluorotitanate =

Identifiers
CAS Number	16962-40-6
3D model (JSmol)	Interactive image
ChemSpider	9496500
ECHA InfoCard	100.037.291
EC Number	241-036-9
PubChem CID	11321546
CompTox Dashboard (EPA)	DTXSID30937653
- InChI: InChI=1S/6FH.2H3N.Ti/h6*1H;2*1H3;/q;;;;;;;;+4/p-4 Key: NMGYKLMMQCTUGI-UHFFFAOYSA-J
- SMILES: [NH4+].[NH4+].F[Ti-2](F)(F)(F)(F)F

Properties
Chemical formula	F_{6}H_{8}N_{2}Ti
Molar mass	197.935 g·mol^{−1}
Appearance	white solid
Density	1.675g/cm^{3}

Related compounds
Other anions	Hexafluorosilicate; Hexafluorotitanic acid
- Except where otherwise noted, data are given for materials in their standard state (at 25 °C [77 °F], 100 kPa). Infobox references

Ammonium hexafluorotitanate is the inorganic compound with the chemical formula (NH_{4})_{2}[TiF_{6}]. A colorless salt, the compound consists of ammonium ions and the hexafluorotitanate dianion.

== Synthesis ==
The compound is encountered in the extraction of titanium from its principal ore ilmenite: the ore is treated with excess ammonium fluoride:

FeTiO_{3} + 10 NH_{4}F → (NH_{4})_{2}FeF_{4} + (NH_{4})_{2}TiF_{6} + 6 H_{2}O

After removal of iron impurities, the titanium is recovered as a hydrated titanium dioxide by treatment of the aqueous extract of the hexafluoride with ammonia:

(NH_{4})_{2}TiF_{6} + 4 NH_{3} + 2 H_{2}O → TiO_{2} + 6 NH_{4}F

== Structure ==
Many salts of hexafluorotitanate have been characterized by X-ray crystallography. In the lattice [TiF_{6}]^{2-} octahedra interact with the ammonium cations by hydrogen bonds.
