= Vanadium(II) chloride =

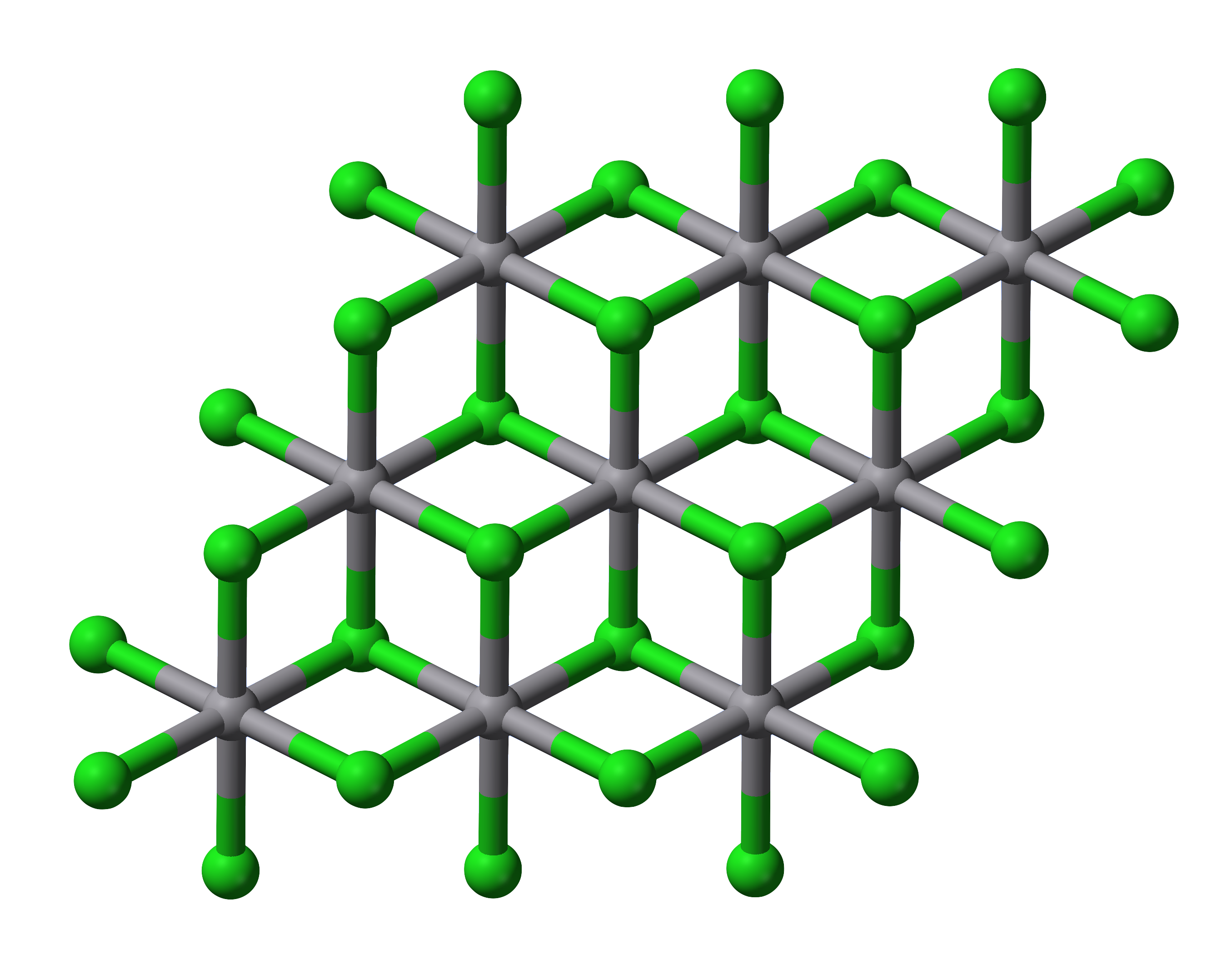
Plan view of a single layer in the crystal structure of vanadium(II) chloride
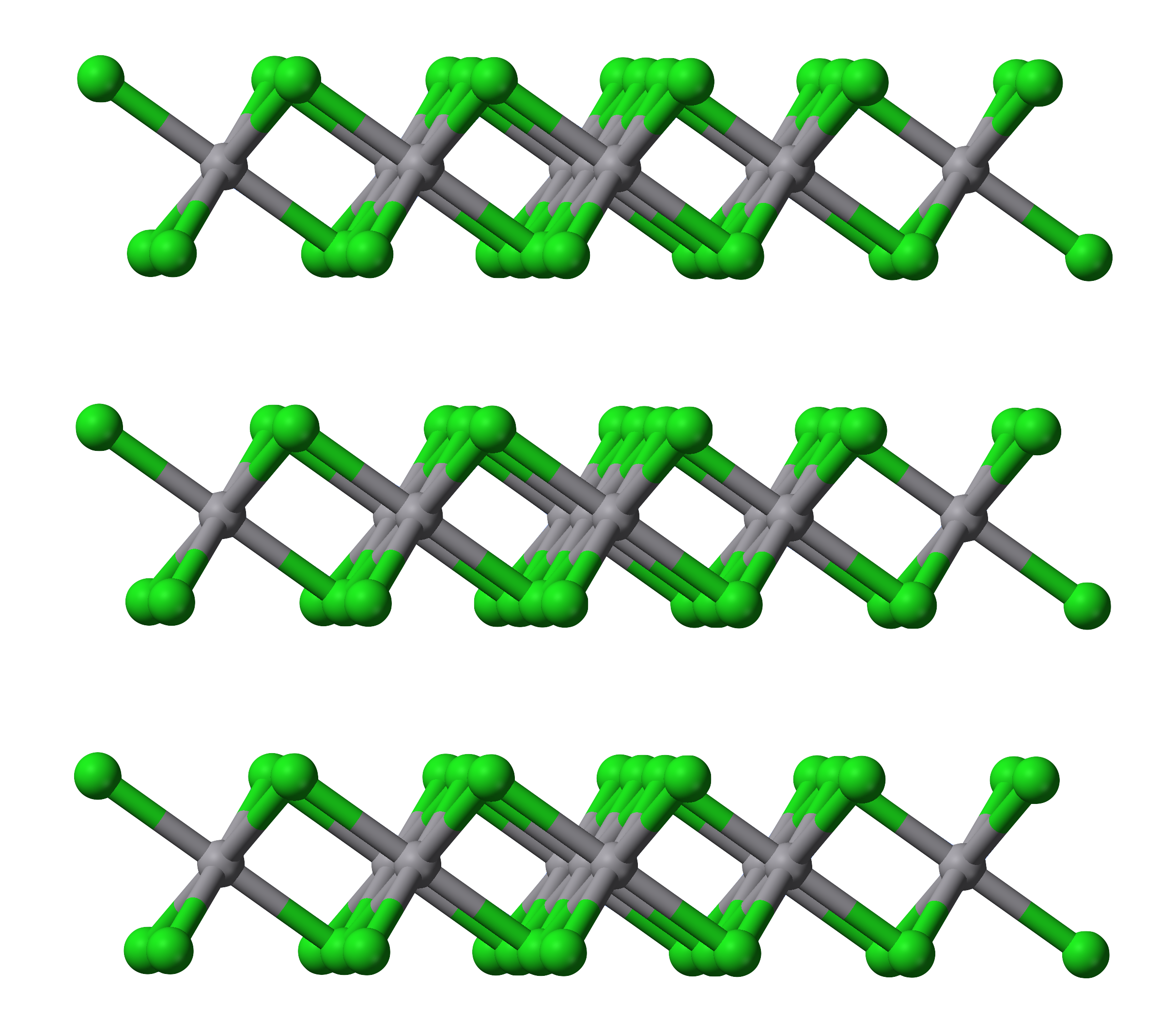
Layer stacking in the crystal structure of vanadium(II) chloride

Names
- IUPAC name Vanadium(II) chloride
- Other names Vanadous chloride

Identifiers
CAS Number	10580-52-6
3D model (JSmol)	Interactive image
ChemSpider	59733
ECHA InfoCard	100.031.057
EC Number	234-176-7
PubChem CID	66355
RTECS number	YW1575000
UNII	5V2RJ2EWG4
CompTox Dashboard (EPA)	DTXSID60147349
- InChI: InChI=1S/2ClH.V/h2*1H;/q;;+2/p-2 Key: ITAKKORXEUJTBC-UHFFFAOYSA-L; InChI=1/2ClH.V/h2*1H;/q;;+2/p-2 Key: ITAKKORXEUJTBC-NUQVWONBAZ
- SMILES: Cl[V]Cl

Properties
Chemical formula	VCl_{2}
Molar mass	121.847 g/mol
Appearance	pale green solid
Density	3.230 g/cm^{3}
Melting point	1,027 °C (1,881 °F; 1,300 K)
Boiling point	1,506 °C (2,743 °F; 1,779 K)
Solubility in water	soluble
Magnetic susceptibility (χ)	+2410.0·10^{−6} cm^{3}/mol

Structure
Crystal structure	CdI_{2}
Coordination geometry	octahedral

Hazards
- Occupational safety and health (OHS/OSH)
Main hazards	Reacts with oxygen rapidly
- GHS labelling
Pictograms	(GHS05: Corrosive) (GHS07: Exclamation mark)
Signal word	Danger
Hazard statements	H302, H314
Precautionary statements	P260, P264, P270, P280, P301+P312, P301+P330+P331, P303+P361+P353, P304+P340, P305+P351+P338, P310, P330, P363, P405

Related compounds
Other anions	vanadium(II) fluoride, vanadium(II) bromide, vanadium(II) iodide
Other cations	titanium(II) chloride, chromium(II) chloride
Related compounds	vanadium(III) chloride
- Except where otherwise noted, data are given for materials in their standard state (at 25 °C [77 °F], 100 kPa). verify (what is ?) Infobox references

Vanadium(II) chloride is the inorganic compound with the formula VCl_{2}, and is the most reduced vanadium chloride. Vanadium(II) chloride is an apple-green solid that dissolves in water to give purple solutions.

== Properties ==
VCl_{2} dissolves in water to give the purple hexaaquo ion [V(H_{2}O)_{6}]^{2+}. Evaporation of such solutions produces crystals of [V(H_{2}O)_{6}]Cl_{2}.

== Structure ==
Solid VCl_{2} adopts the cadmium iodide structure, featuring octahedral coordination geometry. VBr_{2} and VI_{2} are structurally and chemically similar to the dichloride. All have the d^{3} configuration, with a quartet ground state, akin to Cr(III).

== Preparation ==
Solid VCl_{2} is prepared by disproportionation of vanadium trichloride, which leaves a residue of VCl_{2} after evaporation of the tetrachloride:

2 VCl_{3} → VCl_{2} + VCl_{4}

The trichloride can also be reduced by heating under flowing hydrogen:

2 VCl_{3} + H_{2} → 2 VCl_{2} + 2 HCl

== Uses ==
Vanadium dichloride is used as a specialty reductant in organic chemistry. As an aqueous solution, it converts cyclohexylnitrate to cyclohexanone. It reduces phenyl azide into aniline.
