= Titanium tetrabromide =

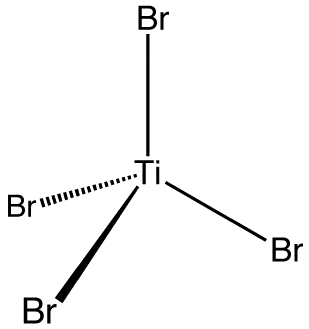
- Titanium tetrabromide

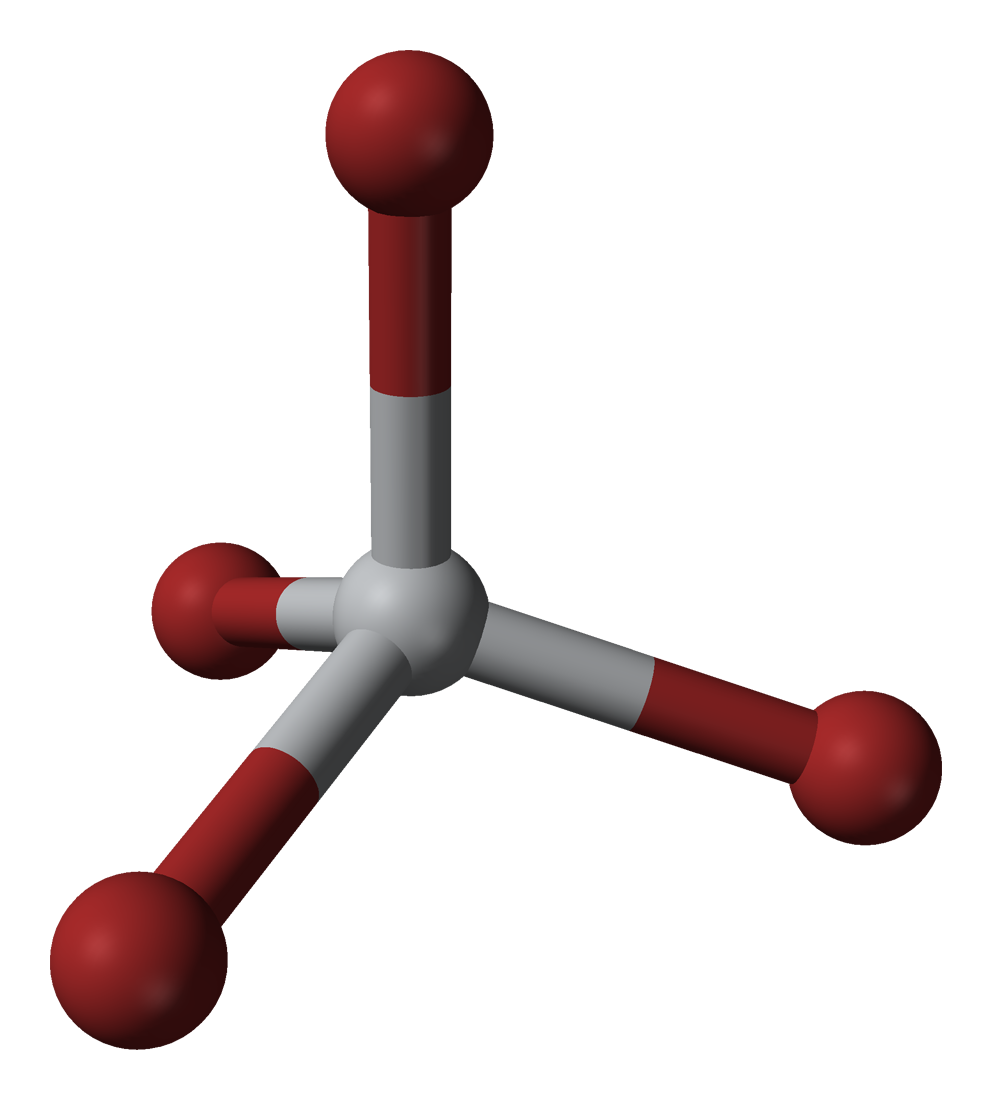
- Ball-and-stick model of the titanium tetrabromide molecule

Names
- IUPAC name Titanium(IV) bromide
- Other names Titanium tetrabromide

Identifiers
CAS Number	7789-68-6
3D model (JSmol)	Interactive image
ChemSpider	109876
ECHA InfoCard	100.029.259
EC Number	232-185-0
PubChem CID	123263
UNII	1CBW950X1W
CompTox Dashboard (EPA)	DTXSID90894990
- InChI: InChI=1S/4BrH.Ti/h4*1H;/q;;;;+4/p-4 Key: UBZYKBZMAMTNKW-UHFFFAOYSA-J
- SMILES: [Ti](Br)(Br)(Br)Br

Properties
Chemical formula	TiBr_{4}
Molar mass	367.483 g/mol
Appearance	brown crystals hygroscopic
Density	3.25 g/cm^{3}
Melting point	39 °C (102 °F; 312 K)
Boiling point	230 °C (446 °F; 503 K)
Solubility in water	hydrolyses
Solubility in other solvents	chlorocarbons, benzene

Structure
Crystal structure	cubic, Pa_{3}, Z = 8
Coordination geometry	Tetrahedral
Dipole moment	0 D

Hazards
- Occupational safety and health (OHS/OSH)
Main hazards	corrosive
- GHS labelling
Pictograms	(GHS05: Corrosive)
Signal word	Danger
Hazard statements	H314
Precautionary statements	P260, P264, P280, P301+P330+P331, P303+P361+P353, P304+P340, P305+P351+P338, P310, P363, P405
NFPA 704 (fire diamond)	3 0 1
Flash point	Non-flammable

Related compounds
Other anions	Titanium(IV) chloride Titanium(IV) fluoride Titanium(IV) iodide
Related compounds	Titanium(III) bromide
- Except where otherwise noted, data are given for materials in their standard state (at 25 °C [77 °F], 100 kPa). verify (what is ?) Infobox references

Titanium tetrabromide is the chemical compound with the formula TiBr_{4}. It is the most volatile transition metal bromide. The properties of TiBr_{4} are an average of TiCl_{4} and TiI_{4}. Some key properties of these four-coordinated Ti(IV) species are their high Lewis acidity and their high solubility in nonpolar organic solvents. TiBr_{4} is diamagnetic, reflecting the d^{0} configuration of the metal centre.

== Preparation and structure ==
This four-coordinated complex adopts a tetrahedral geometry. It can be prepared via several methods: (i) from the elements, (ii) via the reaction of TiO_{2} with carbon and bromine (see Kroll process), and (iii) by treatment of TiCl_{4} with HBr.

== Reactions ==
Titanium tetrabromide forms adducts such as TiBr_{4}(THF)_{2} and [TiBr_{5}]^{−}. With bulky donor ligands, such as 2-methylpyridine (2-Mepy), five-coordinated adducts form. TiBr_{4}(2-MePy) is trigonal bipyramidal with the pyridine in the equatorial plane.

TiBr_{4} has been used as a Lewis-acid catalyst in organic synthesis.

The tetrabromide and tetrachlorides of titanium react to give a statistical mixture of the mixed tetrahalides, TiBr_{4−x}Cl_{x} (x = 0-4). The mechanism of this redistribution reaction is uncertain. One proposed pathway invokes the intermediacy of dimers.

== Safety ==
TiBr_{4} hydrolyzes rapidly, potentially dangerously, to release hydrogen bromide, otherwise known as hydrobromic acid.
