= Vanadium oxydichloride =

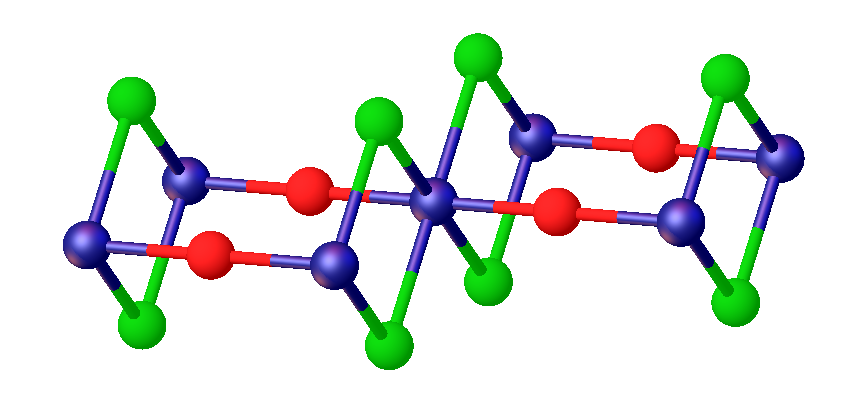

Names
- Other names Vanadyl dichloride

Identifiers
CAS Number	10213-09-9
3D model (JSmol)	Interactive image
ChemSpider	8351674
ECHA InfoCard	100.030.457
EC Number	233-517-7
PubChem CID	10176169
UNII	ET7948FWOY
CompTox Dashboard (EPA)	DTXSID0074429
- InChI: InChI=1S/2ClH.O.V/h2*1H;;/q;;-2;+4/p-2 Key: DBTDJKFFLFILHF-UHFFFAOYSA-L
- SMILES: [O-2].[Cl-].[Cl-].[V+4]

Properties
Chemical formula	VOCl_{2}
Molar mass	137.84 g/mol
Appearance	Green solid
Density	2.88 g/cm^{3}
- Except where otherwise noted, data are given for materials in their standard state (at 25 °C [77 °F], 100 kPa). Infobox references

Vanadium oxydichloride is the inorganic compound with the formula VOCl_{2}. One of several oxychlorides of vanadium, it is a hygroscopic green solid. It is prepared by comproportionation of vanadium trichloride and vanadium(V) oxides:

V_{2}O_{5} + VOCl_{3} + 3 VCl_{3} → 6 VOCl_{2}

As verified by X-ray crystallography, vanadium oxydichloride adopts a layered structure, featuring octahedral vanadium centers linked by doubly bridging oxide and chloride ligands.

From VOCl_{2}, various blue or green-colored oxotri- and oxotetrachloride salts can be prepared. Examples include N(CH_{3})_{4}VOCl_{3} and the pyridinium derivative (C_{5}H_{5}NH)_{2}VOCl_{4}.
