= Titanium tetrafluoride =

Titanium(IV) fluoride
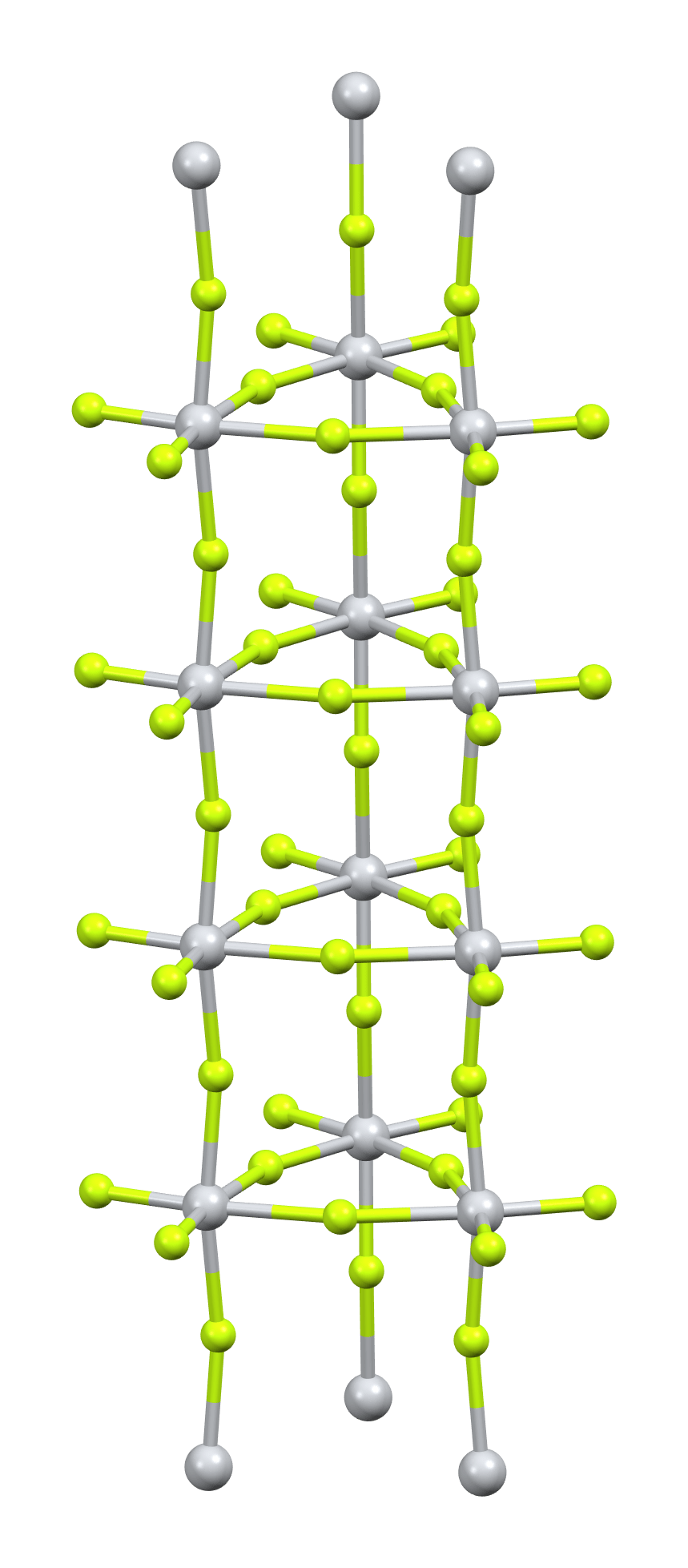
- Titanium(IV) fluoride

Names
- IUPAC name Titanium(IV) fluoride
- Other names Titanium tetrafluoride

Identifiers
CAS Number	7783-63-3
3D model (JSmol)	Interactive image
ChemSpider	7988529
ECHA InfoCard	100.029.106
EC Number	232-017-6
PubChem CID	121824
UNII	T08RW8YRG1
CompTox Dashboard (EPA)	DTXSID50894996
- InChI: InChI=1S/4FH.Ti/h4*1H;/q;;;;+4/p-4 Key: XROWMBWRMNHXMF-UHFFFAOYSA-J; InChI=1/4FH.Ti/h4*1H;/q;;;;+4/p-4 Key: XROWMBWRMNHXMF-XBHQNQODAM
- SMILES: F[Ti](F)(F)F

Properties
Chemical formula	TiF_{4}
Molar mass	123.861 g/mol
Appearance	white powder
Density	2.798 g/cm^{3}
Melting point	377 °C (711 °F; 650 K)
Boiling point	sublimes

Hazards
- GHS labelling
Pictograms	(GHS05: Corrosive) (GHS07: Exclamation mark)
Signal word	Danger
Hazard statements	H302, H312, H314, H332
Precautionary statements	P260, P264, P270, P271, P280, P301+P312, P301+P330+P331, P302+P352, P303+P361+P353, P304+P312, P304+P340, P305+P351+P338, P310, P312, P322, P330, P363, P405
NFPA 704 (fire diamond)	3 0 0

Related compounds
Other anions	Titanium(IV) bromide Titanium(IV) chloride Titanium(IV) iodide
Related compounds	Titanium(III) fluoride
- Except where otherwise noted, data are given for materials in their standard state (at 25 °C [77 °F], 100 kPa). verify (what is ?) Infobox references

Titanium(IV) fluoride is the inorganic compound with the formula TiF_{4}. It is a white hygroscopic solid. In contrast to the other tetrahalides of titanium, it adopts a polymeric structure. In common with the other tetrahalides, TiF_{4} is a strong Lewis acid.

== Preparation and structure ==
The traditional method involves treatment of titanium tetrachloride with excess hydrogen fluoride:

TiCl_{4} + 4 HF → TiF_{4} + 4 HCl

Purification is by sublimation, which involves reversible cracking of the polymeric structure. X-ray crystallography reveals that the Ti centres are octahedral, but conjoined in an unusual columnar structure.

== Reactions ==
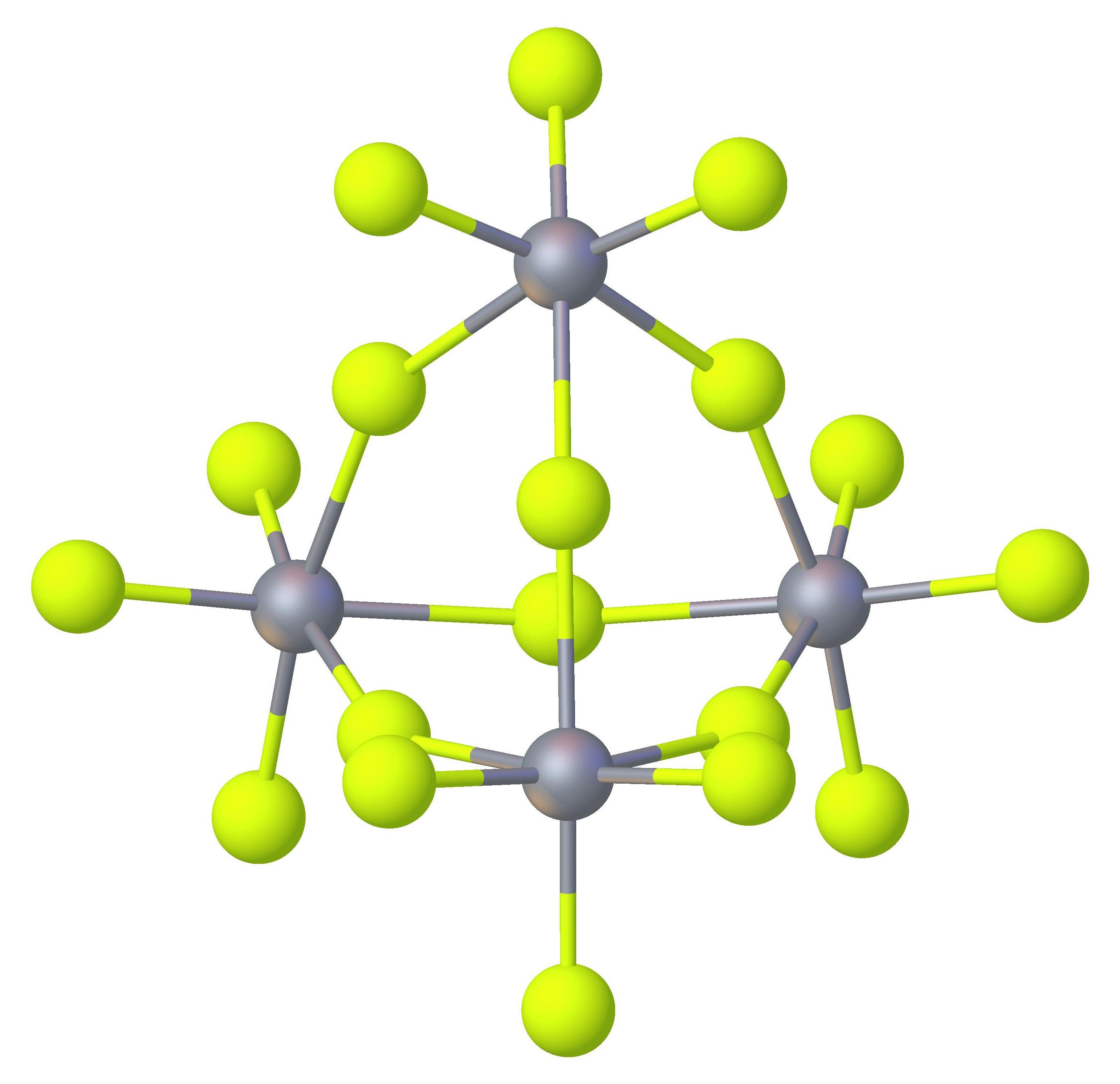
Structure of the [Ti_{4}F_{18}]^{2-} dianion

TiF_{4} forms adducts with many ligands. One example is the complex cis-TiF_{4}(CH_{3}CN)_{2}, which is formed by treatment with acetonitrile. It is also used as a reagent in the preparation of organofluorine compounds. With fluoride, the cluster [Ti_{4}F_{18}]^{2-} forms. It has an adamantane-like Ti_{4}F_{6} core.

Related to its Lewis acidity, TiF_{4} forms a variety of hexafluorides also called hexafluorotitanates. Hexafluorotitanic acid has been used commercially to clean metal surfaces. These salts are stable at pH<4 in the presence of hydrogen fluoride, otherwise they hydrolyze to give oxides.

== Use in dentistry ==
Titanium tetrafluoride has been evaluated for use in prevention of tooth decay, mainly in form of either a varnish or a mouth wash. It is believed to work by depositing a thin coat of titanium dioxide over the tooth enamel, acting as a barrier against further damage as well as by promoting the remineralisation. Its use is still considered experimental.
