= Hexafluorotitanic acid =

Names
- IUPAC name Hexafluorotitanic acid

Identifiers
| CAS Number | anhydrous: 17439-11-1 |
| 3D model (JSmol) | anhydrous: Interactive image |
| ChemSpider | anhydrous: 19989125 |
| ECHA InfoCard | 100.037.676 |
| EC Number | anhydrous: 241-460-4 |
| PubChem CID | anhydrous: 161221 |
| CompTox Dashboard (EPA) | anhydrous: DTXSID70893446 |
- InChI: Key: PFSXARRIPPWGNC-UHFFFAOYSA-J; anhydrous: InChI=1/6FH.Ti/h6*1H;/q;;;;;;+4/p-4/f6F.Ti.2H/h6*1h;;;/q6*-1;m;2*+1
- SMILES: anhydrous: [H+].[H+].F[Ti-2](F)(F)(F)(F)F

Properties
| Chemical formula | F_{6}H_{8}O_{3}Ti |
| Molar mass | 217.918 g·mol^{−1} |
| Appearance | colorless solid |
| Density | 2.10 g/cm^{3} |

Related compounds
| Other anions | Hexafluorosilicic acid Ammonium hexafluorotitanate |
- Except where otherwise noted, data are given for materials in their standard state (at 25 °C [77 °F], 100 kPa). Infobox references

Hexafluorotitanic acid (systematically named oxonium hexafluoridotitanate(2-)) is an inorganic compound with the chemical formula (H_{3}O)(H_{5}O_{2})[TiF_{6}]. According to X-ray crystallography, the salt consists of TiF_{6}^{2−} octahedral anions and two kinds of oxonium cations, (H_{3}O)^{+} and (H_{5}O_{2})^{+}.

As with most oxonium salts, it is only stable in acidic solution. Under basic conditions, closely related salts hydrolyse to a hydrated titanium dioxide:

(NH_{4})_{2}TiF_{6} + 4 NH_{3} + 2 H_{2}O → TiO_{2} + 6 NH_{4}F

A related salt is the anhydrous fluoronium hexafluoridotitanate(2-) or (H_{2}F)_{2}[TiF_{6}].
