= Vanadium pentafluoride =

Vanadium(V) fluoride
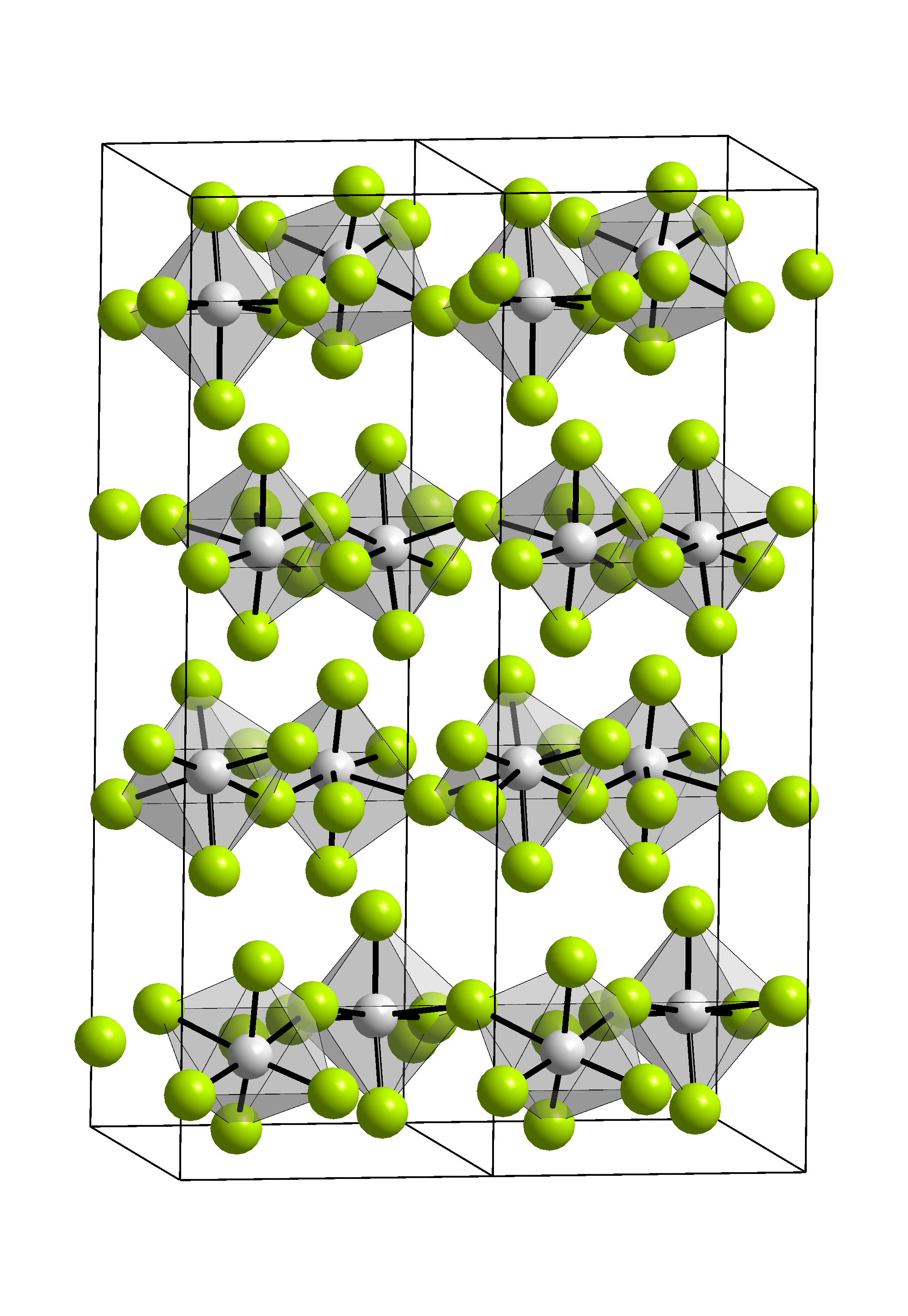

Names
- IUPAC name Vanadium(V) fluoride
- Other names Vanadium pentafluoride

Identifiers
CAS Number	7783-72-4
3D model (JSmol)	Interactive image
ChemSpider	10329757
ECHA InfoCard	100.029.112
EC Number	232-023-9
PubChem CID	13416578
UNII	1GNN7H50UE
- InChI: InChI=1S/5FH.V/h5*1H;/q;;;;;+5/p-5 Key: NFVUDQKTAWONMJ-UHFFFAOYSA-I
- SMILES: [F-].[F-].[F-].[F-].[F-].[V+5]

Properties
Chemical formula	VF_{5}
Molar mass	145.934
Appearance	colorless solid
Density	2.502 g/cm^{3} (solid); 2.483 g/cm^{3} (25 °C)
Melting point	19.5 °C (67.1 °F; 292.6 K)
Boiling point	48.3 °C (118.9 °F; 321.4 K)

Related compounds
Other anions	Vanadium(V) chloride
Other cations	Niobium(V) fluoride Tantalum(V) fluoride Phosphorus pentafluoride
Related Vanadium compounds	Vanadium(V) oxide Vanadium(II) fluoride Vanadium(III) fluoride Vanadium(IV) fluoride
- Except where otherwise noted, data are given for materials in their standard state (at 25 °C [77 °F], 100 kPa). verify (what is ?) Infobox references

Vanadium(V) fluoride is the inorganic compound with the chemical formula VF_{5}. It is a colorless volatile liquid that freezes near room temperature. It is a highly reactive compound, as indicated by its ability to fluorinate organic substances.

== Properties and structure ==
The compound is exclusively a monomer in the gas phase. In the gas phase it adopts D_{3h} symmetric trigonal bipyramidal geometry as indicated by electron diffraction. As a solid, VF_{5} forms a polymeric structure with fluoride-bridged octahedral vanadium centers.

The formation enthalpy of VF_{5} is -1429.4 ± 0.8 kJ/mol.

== Synthesis ==
Vanadium pentafluoride can be prepared by fluorination of vanadium metal:

2 V + 5 F_{2} → 2 VF_{5}

Alternatively, disproportionation of vanadium tetrafluoride yields equal amounts of the solid trifluoride and the volatile pentafluoride:

2 VF_{4} → VF_{3} + VF_{5}

This conversion is conducted at 650 °C. It can also be synthesized by using elemental fluorine to fluorinate industrial concentrates and raw materials so as to produce VF_{5} on an industrial scale. VF_{5} can be synthesized from the reaction of raw materials such as metallic Vanadium, ferrovanadium, vanadium (V) oxide and vanadium tetrafluoride with elemental fluorine.

VF_{5} ionises in the liquid state as reflected by the high values of Trouton's constant and electrical conductivities.

== Characteristics and reactivity ==
Interest in this highly corrosive compound began in the fifties when there were extensive studies of its physicochemical properties. It is a powerful fluorinating and oxidizing agent. It oxidizes elemental sulfur to sulfur tetrafluoride:

S + 4 VF_{5} → 4 VF_{4} + SF_{4}

Like other electrophilic metal halides, it hydrolyzes, first to the oxyhalide:

VF_{5} + H_{2}O → VOF_{3} + 2 HF

Then to the binary oxide:

2 VOF_{3} + 3 H_{2}O → V_{2}O_{5} + 6 HF

Hydrolysis is accelerated in the presence of base. Despite its tendency to hydrolyze, it can be dissolved in alcohols.

It is a Lewis acid, as illustrated by its formation of the hexafluorovanadate:

VF_{5} + KF → KVF_{6}

Vanadium pentafluoride is a weaker acid and mainly undergoes oxidative and fluorinating reactions.

The compound fluorinates unsaturated polyfluoroolefins into polyfluoroalkanes.

The compound dissolves without reaction in liquid Cl_{2} and Br_{2}. VF_{5} is moderately soluble in HF.

== Other reading ==
- Arnold F. Holleman, Nils Wiberg: Lehrbuch der Anorganischen Chemie, 102. Auflage, de Gruyter, Berlin 2007, S. 1545, ISBN 978-3-11-017770-1.
