= Titanium(II) bromide =

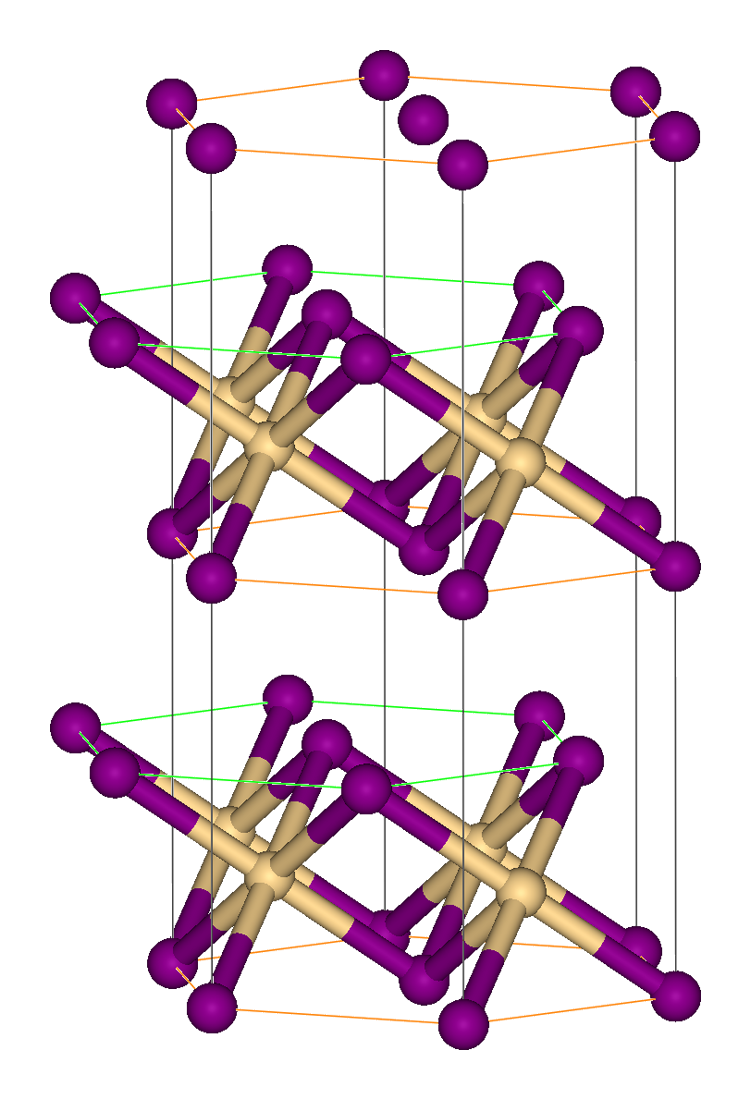

Identifiers
CAS Number	13783-04-5
3D model (JSmol)	Interactive image
ChemSpider	109721
PubChem CID	11390146
CompTox Dashboard (EPA)	DTXSID301312879
- InChI: InChI=1S/2BrH.Ti/h2*1H;/q;;+2/p-2 Key: AUZMWGNTACEWDV-UHFFFAOYSA-L
- SMILES: [Ti+2].[Br-].[Br-]

Properties
Chemical formula	TiBr_{2}
Molar mass	207.68
Appearance	black solid
Density	4.41 g/cm^{3}
- Except where otherwise noted, data are given for materials in their standard state (at 25 °C [77 °F], 100 kPa). Infobox references

Titanium(II) bromide is the inorganic compound with the formula TiBr_{2}. It is a black micaceous solid. It adopts the cadmium iodide structure, featuring octahedral Ti(II) centers. It arises via the reaction of the elements:

Ti + Br_{2} → TiBr_{2}

The compound reacts with caesium bromide to give the linear chain compound CsTiBr_{3}.
