= Vanadium(III) bromide =

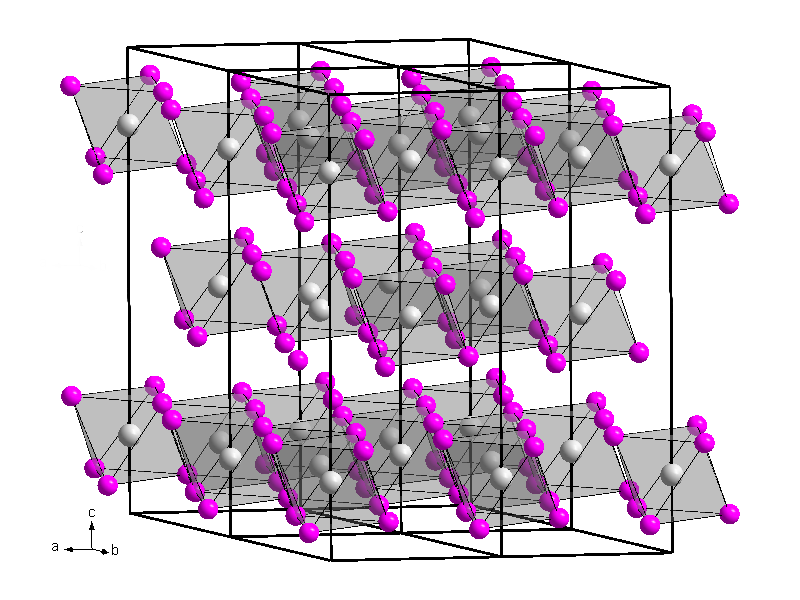
- Vanadium(III) bromide

Names
- IUPAC name Vanadium(III) bromide
- Other names Vanadium tribromide

Identifiers
CAS Number	13470-26-3
3D model (JSmol)	Interactive image
ChemSpider	11476059
ECHA InfoCard	100.033.382
EC Number	236-736-6
PubChem CID	83509
RTECS number	YW2750000
UNII	KB5CDP6ZK3
CompTox Dashboard (EPA)	DTXSID4065498
- InChI: InChI=1S/3BrH.V/h3*1H;/q;;;+3/p-3 Key: ZOYIPGHJSALYPY-UHFFFAOYSA-K; InChI=1/3BrH.V/h3*1H;/q;;;+3/p-3 Key: ZOYIPGHJSALYPY-DFZHHIFOAP
- SMILES: Br[V](Br)Br

Properties
Chemical formula	VBr_{3}
Molar mass	290.654 g/mol
Appearance	Green-black solid
Density	4 g/cm^{3}
Solubility in water	soluble
Solubility	soluble in THF (forms adduct)
Magnetic susceptibility (χ)	+2890.0·10^{−6} cm^{3}/mol

Structure
Coordination geometry	octahedral

Hazards
- GHS labelling
Pictograms	(GHS05: Corrosive)
Signal word	Danger
Hazard statements	H314
Precautionary statements	P260, P264, P280, P301+P330+P331, P302+P361+P354, P304+P340, P305+P354+P338, P316, P321, P363, P405, P501

Related compounds
Other anions	Vanadium(III) chloride
Other cations	Titanium(III) bromide Molybdenum(III) bromide
Related compounds	Vanadium(II) bromide
- Except where otherwise noted, data are given for materials in their standard state (at 25 °C [77 °F], 100 kPa). verify (what is ?) Infobox references

Vanadium(III) bromide, also known as vanadium tribromide, describes the inorganic compounds with the formula VBr_{3} and its hydrates. The anhydrous material is a green-black solid. In terms of its structure, the compound is polymeric with octahedral vanadium(III) surrounded by six bromide ligands.

== Preparation ==
VBr_{3} has been prepared by treatment of vanadium tetrachloride with hydrogen bromide:

2 VCl_{4} + 8 HBr → 2 VBr_{3} + 8 HCl + Br_{2}

The reaction proceeds via the unstable vanadium(IV) bromide (VBr_{4}), which releases Br_{2} near room temperature.

It is also possible to prepare vanadium(III) bromide by reacting bromine with vanadium or ferrovanadine:

2 V + 3 Br_{2} → 2 VBr_{3}
2 VFe + 6 Br_{2} → 2 VBr_{3} + FeBr_{3}

== Properties ==
=== Physical ===
Vanadium(III) bromide is present in the form of black, leafy, very hygroscopic crystals with a sometimes greenish sheen. It is soluble in water with green color. Its crystal structure is isotypic to that of vanadium(III) chloride with space group R3̅c (space group no. 167), a = 6.400 Å, c = 18.53 Å. When heated to temperatures of around 500 °C, a violet gas phase is formed, from which, under suitable conditions, red vanadium(IV) bromide can be separated by rapid cooling, which decomposes at −23 °C.

=== Chemical ===
Like vanadium(III) chloride, vanadium(III) bromide forms red-brown soluble complexes with dimethoxyethane and THF, such as mer-VBr_{3}(THF)_{3}.

Aqueous solutions prepared from VBr_{3} contain the cation trans-[VBr_{2}(H_{2}O)_{4}]^{+}. Evaporation of these solutions give the salt trans-[VBr_{2}(H_{2}O)_{4}]Br^{.}(H_{2}O)_{2}.
