= Titanium(III) fluoride =

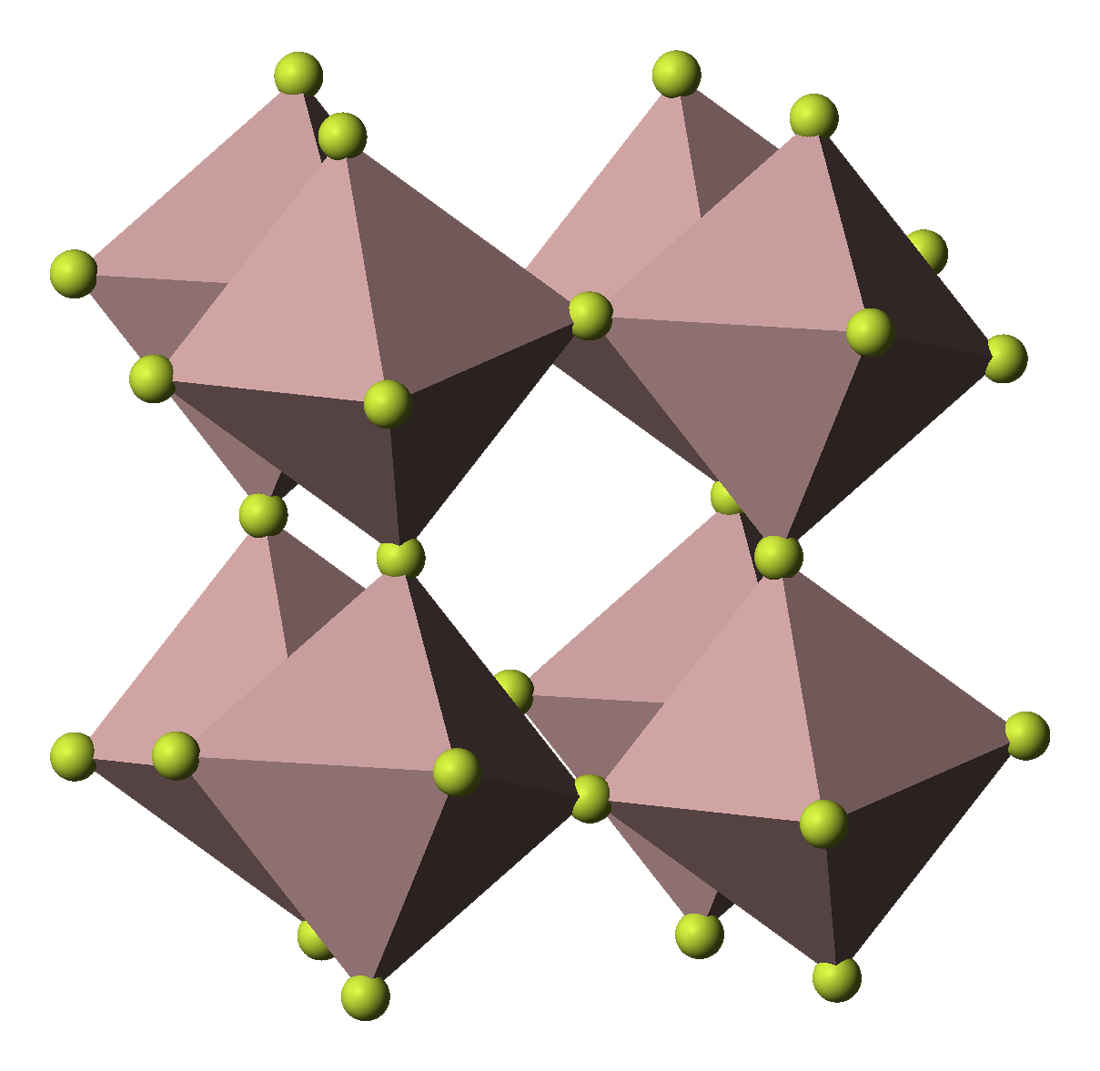
- Titanium(III) fluoride

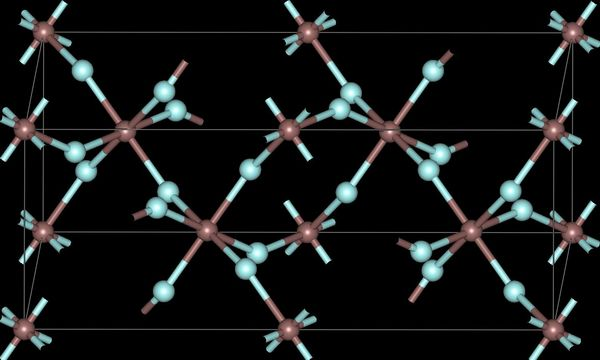

Names
- IUPAC name Titanium(III) fluoride
- Other names: Titanium trifluoride; Titanous fluoride; Trifluorotitanium

Identifiers
| CAS Number | 13470-08-1 |
| 3D model (JSmol) | Interactive image |
| ChemSpider | 75341 |
| ECHA InfoCard | 100.033.379 |
| EC Number | 236-732-4 |
| PubChem CID | 83506 |
| CompTox Dashboard (EPA) | DTXSID9065495 |
- InChI: InChI=1S/3FH.Ti/h3*1H;/q;;;+3/p-3 Key: NLPMQGKZYAYAFE-UHFFFAOYSA-K; InChI=1/3FH.Ti/h3*1H;/q;;;+3/p-3 Key: NLPMQGKZYAYAFE-DFZHHIFOAU
- SMILES: F[Ti](F)F

Properties
| Chemical formula | TiF_{3} |
| Molar mass | 104.862 g·mol^{−1} |
| Appearance | violet to purple-red powder |
| Density | 2.98 g/cm^{3} |
| Melting point | 1,200 °C (2,190 °F; 1,470 K) |
| Boiling point | 1,400 °C (2,550 °F; 1,670 K) |
| Solubility in water | soluble |
| Magnetic susceptibility (χ) | 1.3×10^{−9} cm^{3}/mol |

Structure
| Crystal structure | Rhombohedral, hR24 |
| Space group | R-3c, No. 167 |

Hazards
- Occupational safety and health (OHS/OSH)
| Main hazards | Corrosive |
- GHS labelling
| Pictograms | (GHS05: Corrosive) |
| Signal word | Danger |
| Hazard statements | H314 |
| Precautionary statements | P260, P280, P303+P361+P353, P304+P340+P310, P305+P351+P338, P363 |
| NFPA 704 (fire diamond) | 4 0 0 W |

Related compounds
| Other anions | Titanium(III) bromide; Titanium(III) chloride; Titanium(III) iodide |
| Related compounds | Titanium(IV) fluoride |
- Except where otherwise noted, data are given for materials in their standard state (at 25 °C [77 °F], 100 kPa). verify (what is ?) Infobox references

Titanium(III) fluoride is the inorganic compound with the formula TiF_{3}. A violet, paramagnetic solid, it is one of two titanium fluorides, the other being titanium tetrafluoride. It adopts a defect perovskite-like structure such that each Ti center has octahedral coordination geometry, and each fluoride ligand is doubly bridging.

Titanium(III) fluoride can be prepared by dissolution of titanium metal in hydrofluoric acid. It oxidizes to Titanium dioxide (TiO_{2}) above 100 °C (212 °F) in air.
