= Vanadium(III) iodide =

Names
- IUPAC name Vanadium(III) iodide
- Other names Vanadium triiodide

Identifiers
CAS Number	15513-94-7
3D model (JSmol)	Interactive image
ChemSpider	11178828
ECHA InfoCard	100.035.937
EC Number	239-547-7
PubChem CID	3627252
CompTox Dashboard (EPA)	DTXSID701045888
- InChI: InChI=1S/3HI.V/h3*1H;/q;;;+3/p-3 Key: AAWFOGYSSVYINI-UHFFFAOYSA-K
- SMILES: [I-].[I-].[I-].[V+3]

Properties
Chemical formula	VI_{3}
Molar mass	431.6549 g/mol
Appearance	black solid
Density	5.14 g/cm^{3}, solid
Solubility in water	soluble

Structure
Coordination geometry	octahedral

Related compounds
Other anions	Vanadium(III) bromide
Other cations	Titanium(III) iodide
Related compounds	VI_{2}
- Except where otherwise noted, data are given for materials in their standard state (at 25 °C [77 °F], 100 kPa). verify (what is ?) Infobox references

Vanadium(III) iodide is the inorganic compound with the formula VI_{3}. This paramagnetic solid is generated by the reaction of vanadium powder with iodine at around 500 °C. The black hygroscopic crystals dissolve in water to give green solutions, characteristic of V(III) ions.

The purification of vanadium metal by the chemical transport reaction involving the reversible formation of vanadium(III) iodides in the presence of iodine and its subsequent decomposition to yield pure metal:

2 V + 3 I_{2} ⇌ 2 VI_{3}

VI_{3} crystallizes in the motif adopted by bismuth(III) iodide: the iodides are hexagonal-closest packed and the vanadium centers occupy one third of the octahedral holes.

When solid samples are heated, the gas contains VI_{4}, which is probably the volatile vanadium component in the vapor transport method. Thermal decomposition of the triiodide leaves a residue of vanadium(II) iodide:

2 VI_{3} → VI_{2} + VI_{4} ΔH = 36.6 kcal/mol (153 kJ/mol); ΔS = 38.7 cal (162 J) mol^{−1} K^{−1}.
