= Vanadium(II) bromide =

Names
- IUPAC name Vanadium(II) bromide
- Other names Vanadium dibromide

Identifiers
CAS Number	14890-41-6
3D model (JSmol)	Interactive image
ChemSpider	8461357
PubChem CID	10285888
CompTox Dashboard (EPA)	DTXSID10437762
- InChI: InChI=1S/2BrH.V/h2*1H;/q;;+2/p-2 Key: WSJLOGNSKRVGAD-UHFFFAOYSA-L
- SMILES: Br[V]Br

Properties
Chemical formula	VBr_{2}
Molar mass	210.750 g/mol
Appearance	light-brown solid
Density	4.58 g/cm^{3}
Melting point	827 °C (1,521 °F; 1,100 K)
Boiling point	1,227 °C (2,241 °F; 1,500 K)
Solubility in water	reacts
Magnetic susceptibility (χ)	+3230.0·10^{−6} cm^{3}/mol

Structure
Crystal structure	trigonal

Related compounds
Other anions	vanadium(II) chloride, vanadium(II) iodide
Related compounds	vanadium(III) bromide
- Except where otherwise noted, data are given for materials in their standard state (at 25 °C [77 °F], 100 kPa). Infobox references

Vanadium(II) bromide is an inorganic compound with the formula VBr_{2}. It adopts the cadmium iodide structure, featuring octahedral V(II) centers. A hexahydrate is also known. The hexahydrate undergoes partial dehydration to give the tetrahydrate. Both the hexa- and tetrahydrates are bluish in color. The compound is produced by the reduction of vanadium(III) bromide with hydrogen.
