= Vanadium(III) chloride =

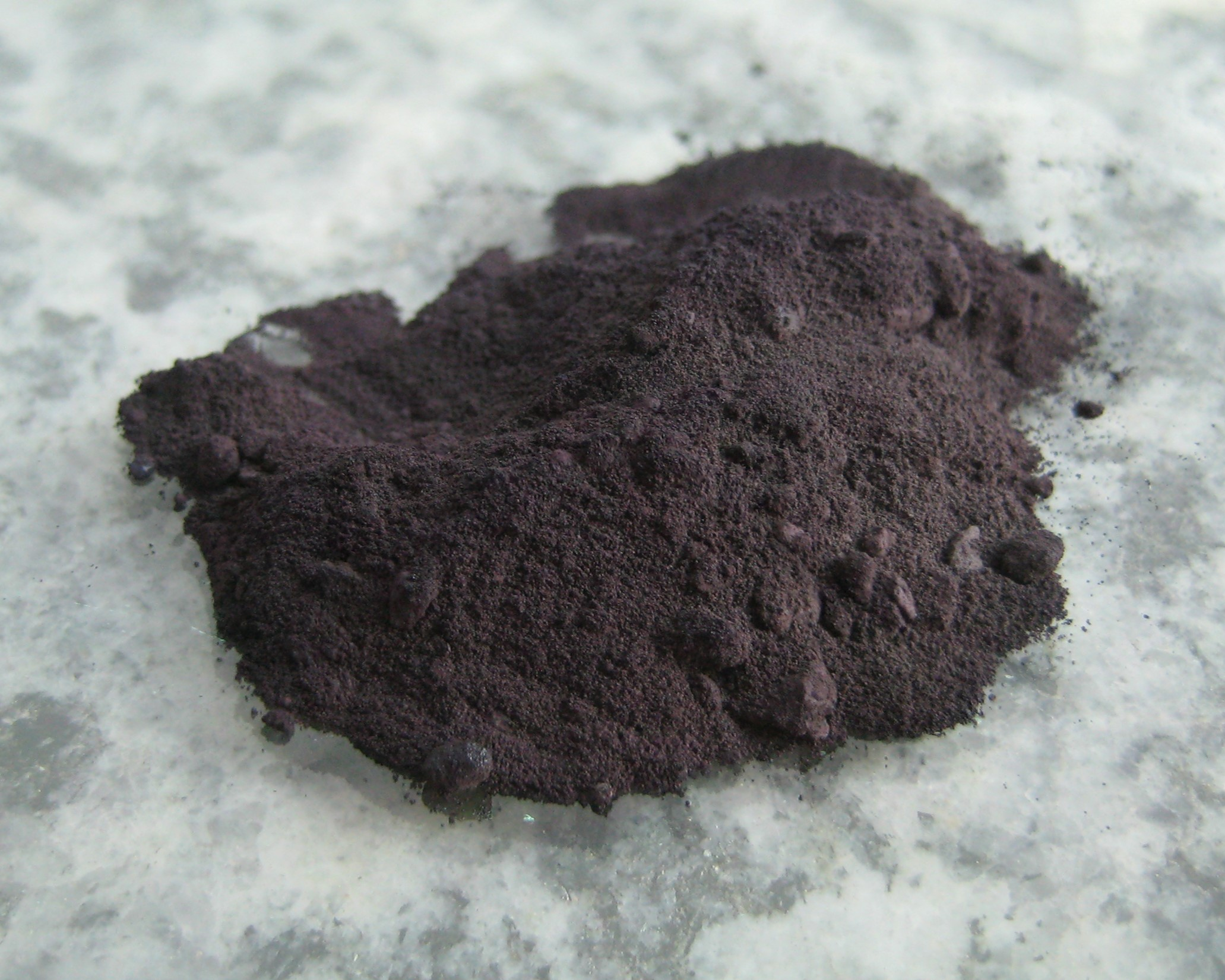
- Anhydrous

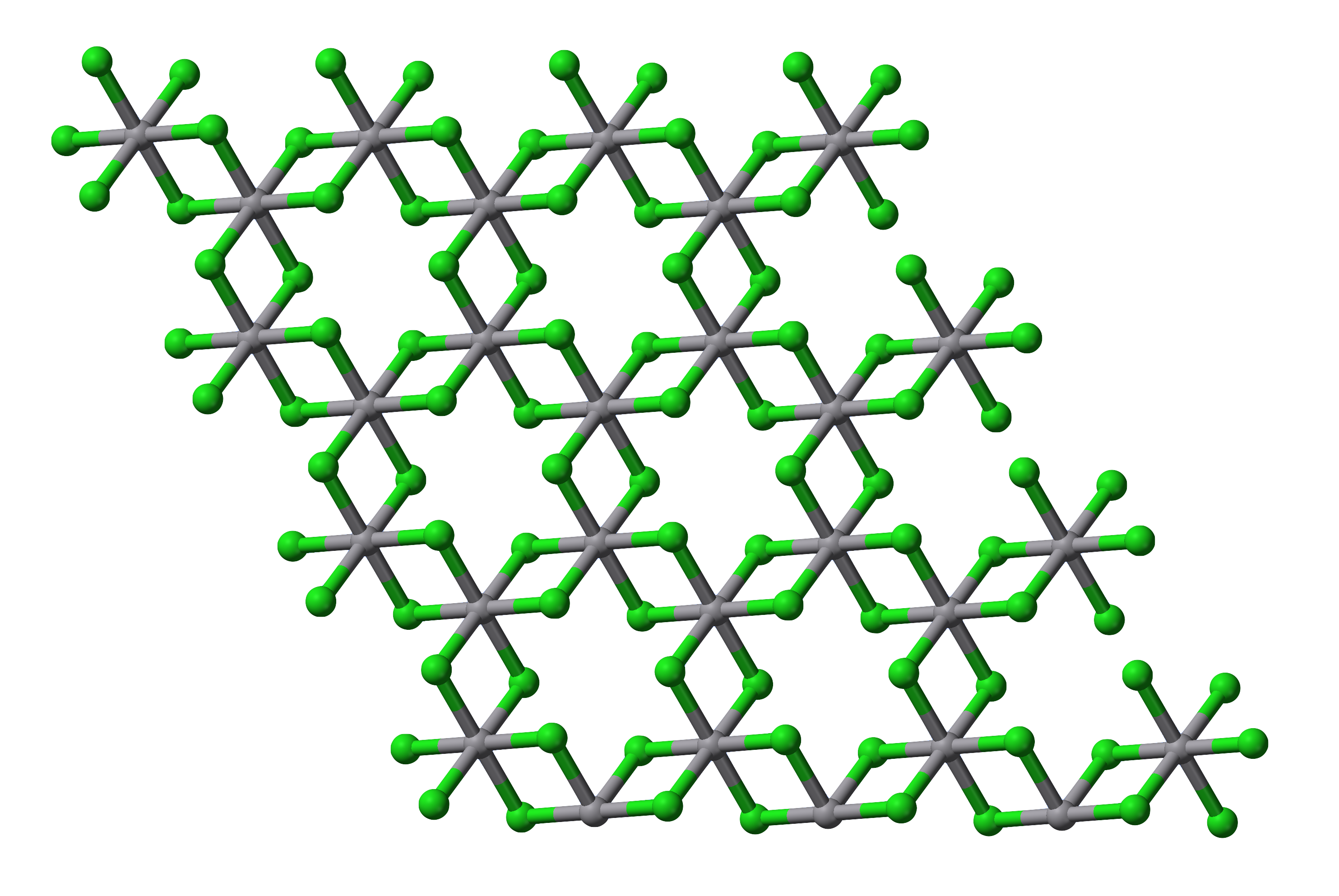
- Plan view of a single layer in the crystal structure of vanadium(III) chloride

Names
- IUPAC names Vanadium(III) chloride Vanadium trichloride

Identifiers
CAS Number	7718-98-1
3D model (JSmol)	anhydrous: Interactive image; hexahydrate: Interactive image
ChemSpider	10801024
ECHA InfoCard	100.028.859
EC Number	231-744-6
PubChem CID	62647
RTECS number	YW2800000
UN number	2475
CompTox Dashboard (EPA)	DTXSID3064776
- InChI: InChI=1S/3ClH.V/h3*1H;/q;;;+3/p-3 Key: HQYCOEXWFMFWLR-UHFFFAOYSA-K; InChI=1/3ClH.V/h3*1H;/q;;;+3/p-3 Key: HQYCOEXWFMFWLR-DFZHHIFOAB
- SMILES: anhydrous: Cl[V](Cl)Cl; hexahydrate: Cl[V-3](Cl)([OH2+])([OH2+])([OH2+])[OH2+].[Cl-].O.O

Properties
Chemical formula	VCl_{3}
Molar mass	157.30 g/mol
Appearance	violet crystals (anhydrous) green crystals (hexahydrate)
Density	2.8 g/cm^{3} (anhydrous); 1.84 g/cm^{3} (hexahydrate)
Melting point	350 °C (662 °F; 623 K) (decomposes, anhydrous)
Solubility in water	soluble
Magnetic susceptibility (χ)	+3030.0·10^{−6} cm^{3}/mol

Structure
Crystal structure	Trigonal, hR24
Space group	R3̅, No. 148
Lattice constant	a = 6.012 Å, b = 6.012 Å, c = 17.34 Å α = 90°, β = 90°, γ = 120° (anhydrous)

Thermochemistry
Heat capacity (C)	93.2 J mol^{−1} K^{−1}
Std molar entropy (S^{⦵}_{298})	131.0 J mol^{−1} K^{−1}
Std enthalpy of formation (Δ_{f}H^{⦵}_{298})	−580.7 kJ/mol
Gibbs free energy (Δ_{f}G^{⦵})	−511.2 kJ/mol

Hazards
- GHS labelling
Pictograms	(GHS05: Corrosive) (GHS07: Exclamation mark)
Signal word	Danger
Hazard statements	H302, H314
Precautionary statements	P260, P264, P270, P280, P301+P312+P330, P301+P330+P331, P303+P361+P353, P304+P340+P310, P305+P351+P338+P310, P363, P405, P501
NFPA 704 (fire diamond)	3 0 2
Flash point	Non-flammable

Related compounds
Other anions	Vanadium(III) fluoride Vanadium(III) bromide Vanadium(III) iodide
Other cations	Titanium(III) chloride Chromium(III) chloride Niobium(III) chloride Tantalum(III) chloride
Related compounds	Vanadium(II) chloride Vanadium(IV) chloride
- Except where otherwise noted, data are given for materials in their standard state (at 25 °C [77 °F], 100 kPa). verify (what is ?) Infobox references

Vanadium(III) chloride describes the inorganic compound with the formula VCl_{3} and its hydrates. It forms a purple anhydrous form and a green hexahydrate [VCl_{2}(H_{2}O)_{4}]Cl·2H_{2}O. These hygroscopic salts are common precursors to other vanadium(III) complexes and is used as a mild reducing agent.

== Structure and electronic configuration ==
VCl_{3} has the common layered BiI_{3} structure, a motif that features hexagonally closest-packed chloride framework with vanadium ions occupying the octahedral holes. VBr_{3} and VI_{3} adopt the same structure, but VF_{3} features a structure more closely related to ReO_{3}. The V^{3+}cation has a d^{2} electronic configuration with two unpaired electrons, making the compound paramagnetic. VCl_{3} is a Mott insulator and undergoes an antiferromagnetic transition at low temperatures.

Solid hexahydrate, [VCl_{2}(H_{2}O)_{4}]Cl·2H_{2}O, has a monoclinic crystal structure and consists of slightly distorted octahedral trans-[VCl_{2}(H_{2}O)_{4}]^{+} centers as well as chloride and two molecules of water of crystallization. The hexahydrate phase loses two water of crystallization to form the tetrahydrate if heated to 90 °C in a stream of hydrogen chloride gas.

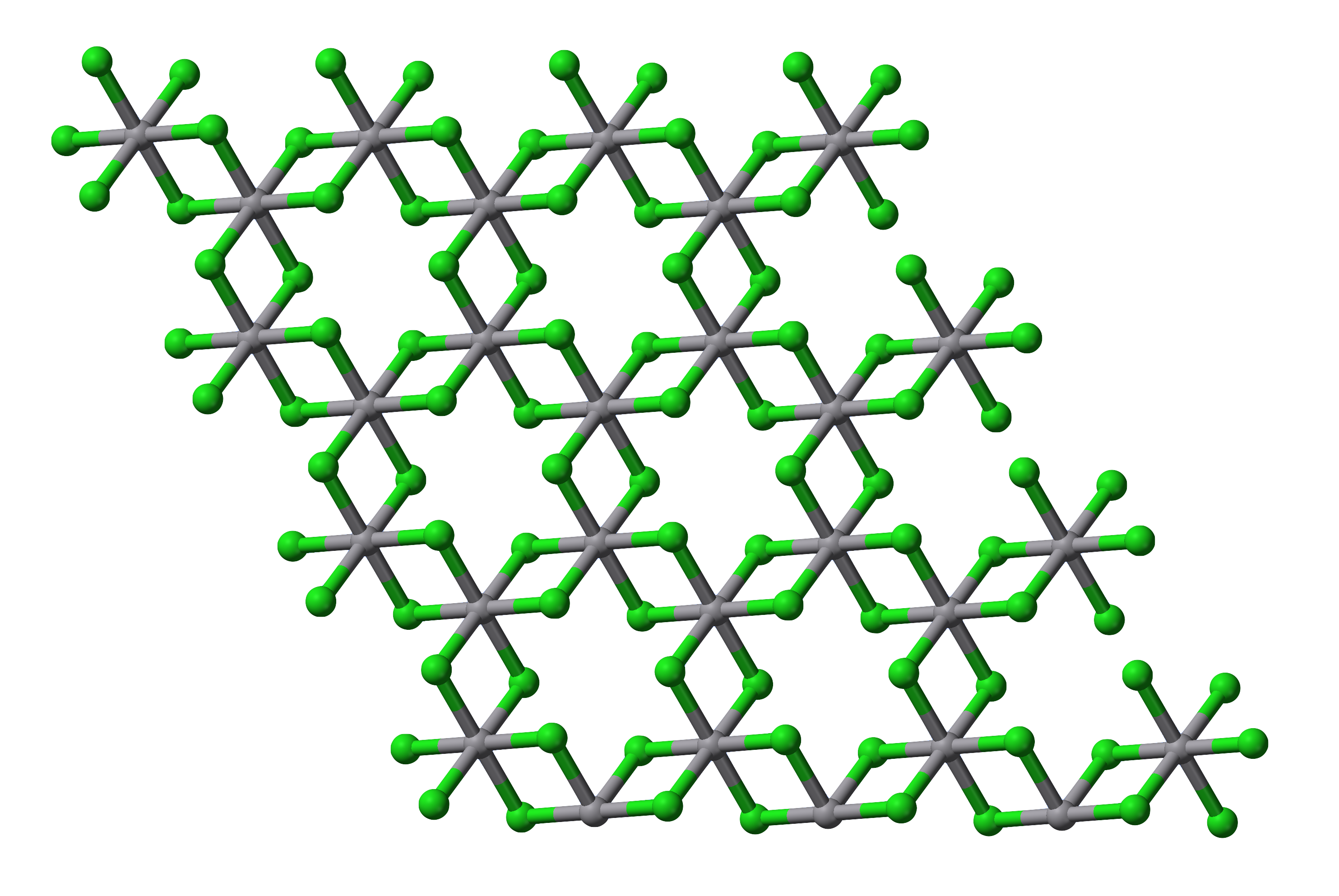
Plan view of a single layer in the crystal structure of vanadium(III) chloride

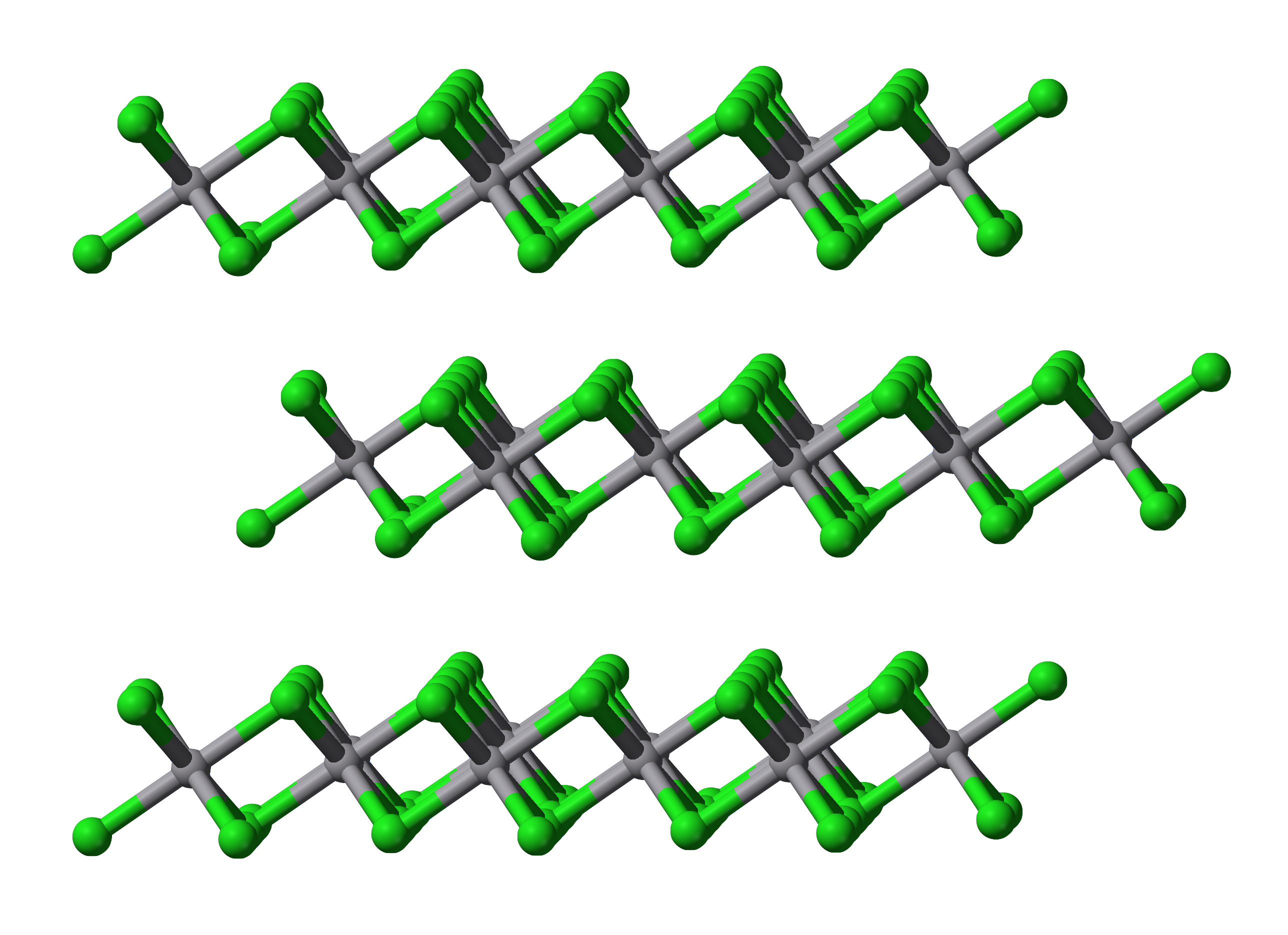
Layer stacking in the crystal structure of vanadium(III) chloride

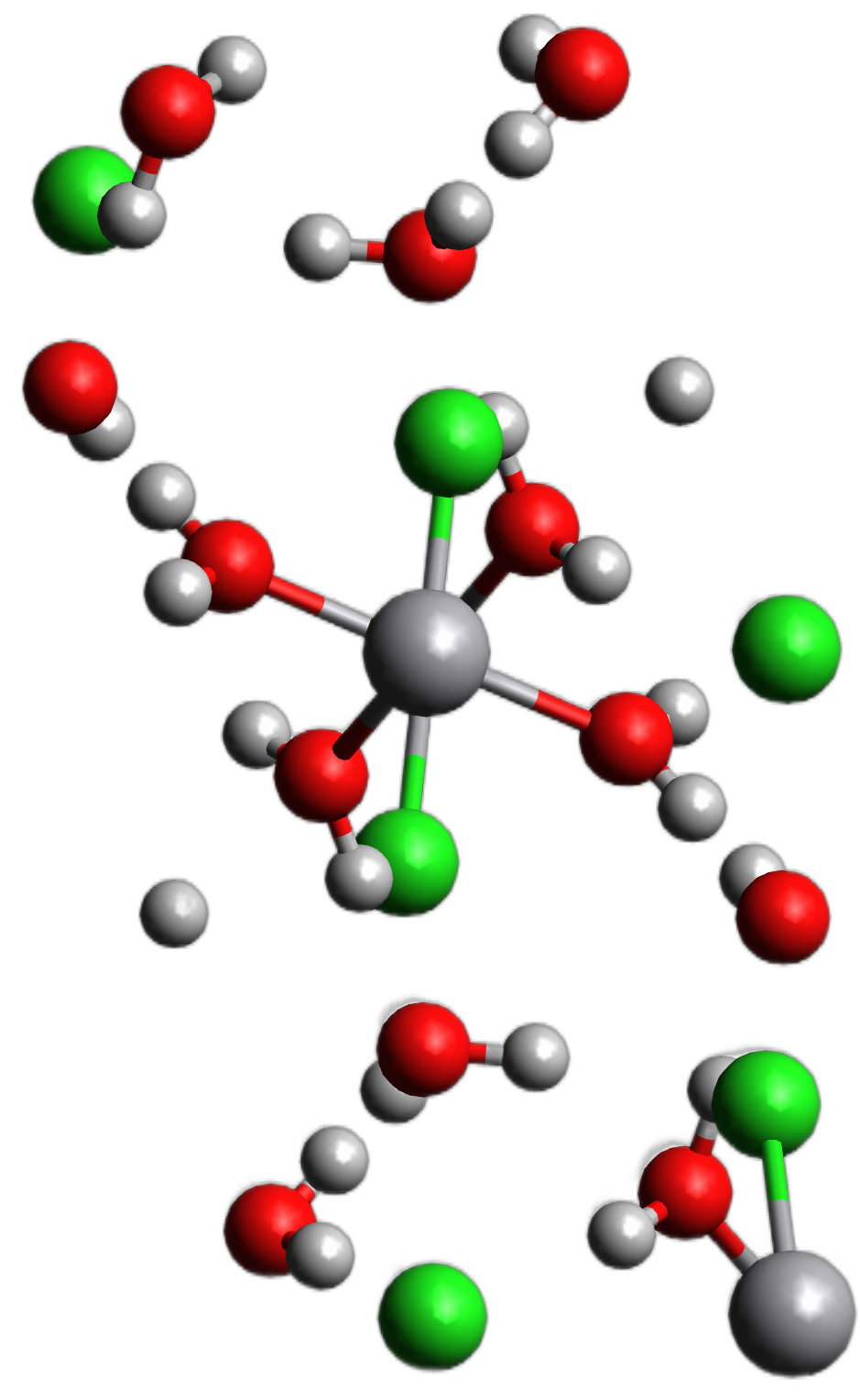
Unit cell of hexahydrate, featuring [VCl_{2}(H_{2}O)_{4}]^{+} centres

== Uses ==
Solutions of vanadium(III) chloride in sulfuric acid and hydrochloric acid are used as electrolytes in vanadium redox batteries. It is also used as a mild Lewis acid in organic synthesis. One example of such is its use as a catalyst in the cleavage of the acetonide group. Another example of the use of VCl_{3} as a reducing agent is shown in the determination of nitrate and nitrite concentration in water, where VCl_{3} reduces nitrate to nitrite. This method is a safer alternative to the cadmium column method.

== Preparation ==
VCl_{3} is prepared by heating VCl_{4} at 160–170 °C under a flowing stream of inert gas, which sweeps out the Cl_{2}. The bright red liquid converts to a purple solid.

The vanadium oxides can also be used to produce vanadium(III) chloride. For example, vanadium(III) oxide reacts with thionyl chloride at 200 °C:

V_{2}O_{3} + 3 SOCl_{2} → 2 VCl_{3} + 3 SO_{2}

The reaction of vanadium(V) oxide and disulfur dichloride also produces vanadium(III) chloride with the release of sulfur dioxide and sulfur.

The hexahydrate can be prepared by evaporation of acidic aqueous solutions of the trichloride.

== Reactions ==
When dissolved in water, the compound forms the green hydrate:

VCl_{3} + 4 H_{2}O → [VCl_{2}(H_{2}O)_{4}]^{+} + Cl^{−}

Heating of VCl_{3} decomposes with volatilization of VCl_{4}, leaving VCl_{2} above 350 °C. Upon heating under H_{2} at 675 °C (but less than 700 °C), VCl_{3} reduces to greenish VCl_{2}.

2 VCl_{3} + H_{2} → 2 VCl_{2} + 2 HCl

Comproportionation of vanadium trichloride and vanadium(V) oxides gives vanadium oxydichloride:

V_{2}O_{5} + VOCl_{3} + 3 VCl_{3} → 6 VOCl_{2}

The heating of the hexahydrate does not give the anhydrous form, instead undergoes partial hydrolysis and forms vanadium oxydichloride at 160 °C. In an inert atmosphere, it forms a trihydrate at 130 °C and at higher temperatures, it forms vanadium oxychloride.

Vanadium trichloride catalyses the pinacol coupling reaction of benzaldehyde (PhCHO) to 1,2-diphenyl-1,2-ethanediol by various reducing metals such as zinc:

Zn + 2 H_{2}O + 2 PhCHO → (PhCH(OH))_{2} + Zn(OH)_{2}

=== Complexes ===
VCl_{3} forms colorful adducts and derivatives with a broad scale of ligands. VCl_{3} dissolves in water to give the aquo complexes. From these solutions, the hexahydrate [VCl_{2}(H_{2}O)_{4}]Cl^{.}2H_{2}O crystallizes. In other words, two of the water molecules are not bound to the vanadium, whose structure resembles the corresponding Fe(III) derivative. Removal of the two bound chloride ligands gives the green hexaaquo complex [V(H_{2}O)_{6}]^{3+}.

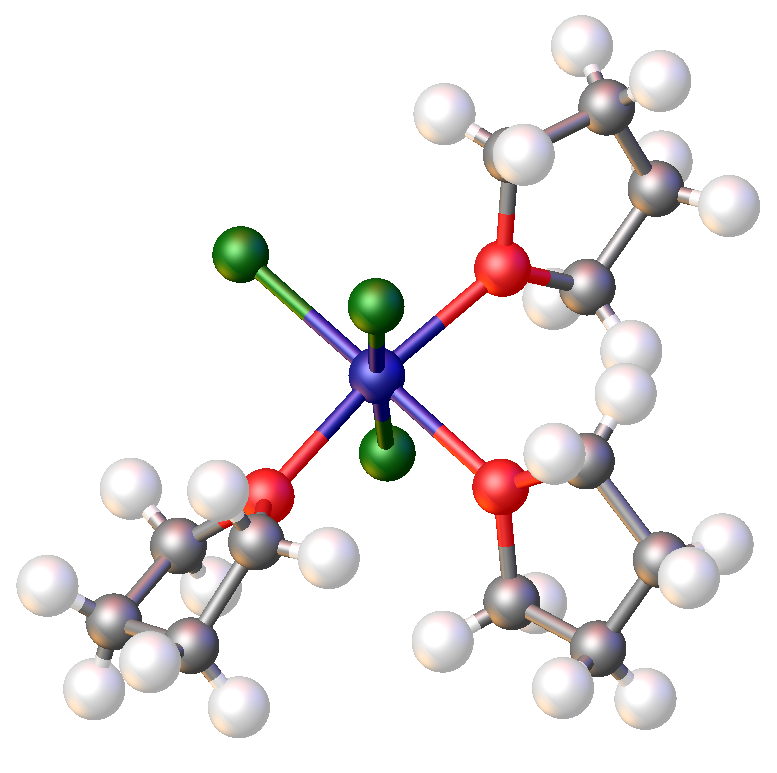
Structure of VCl_{3}(thf)_{3}.

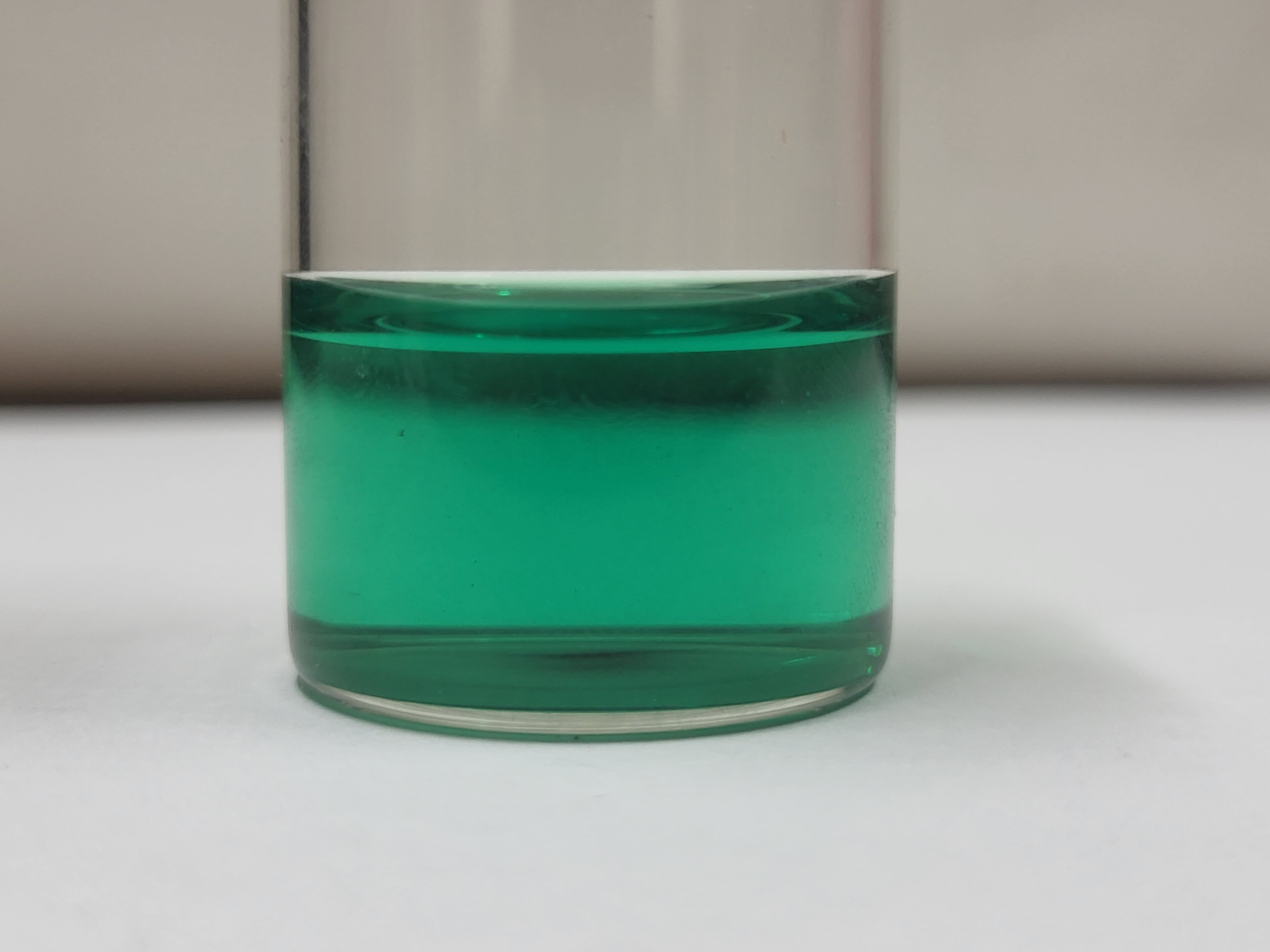
A solution of vanadium(III) chloride

With tetrahydrofuran, VCl_{3} forms the red/pink complex VCl_{3}(THF)_{3}, and the red complex [VCl_{3}(THF)_{2}]_{2}. Reduction of VCl_{3}(THF)_{3} gives [(V(THF)_{3})_{2}Cl_{3}]_{2}[Zn_{2}Cl_{6}], Caulton's reagent".

Vanadium(III) chloride reacts with acetonitrile to give the green adduct VCl_{3}(MeCN)_{3}. When treated with KCN, VCl_{3} converts to [V(CN)_{7}]^{4−} (early metals commonly adopt coordination numbers greater than 6 with compact ligands). Complementarily, larger metals can form complexes with rather bulky ligands. This aspect is illustrated by the isolation of VCl_{3}(NMe_{3})_{2}, containing two bulky NMe_{3} ligands. Vanadium(III) chloride is able to form complexes with other adducts, such as pyridine or triphenylphosphine oxide.

=== Organometallic derivatives ===
Vanadium(III) chloride as its thf complex is a precursor to V(mesityl)_{3}.

VCl_{3}(THF)_{3} + 3 LiC_{6}H_{2}-2,4,6-Me_{3} → V(C_{6}H_{2}-2,4,6-Me_{3})_{3}(THF) + 3 LiCl
