= Vanadium tetrafluoride =

Vanadium(IV) fluoride
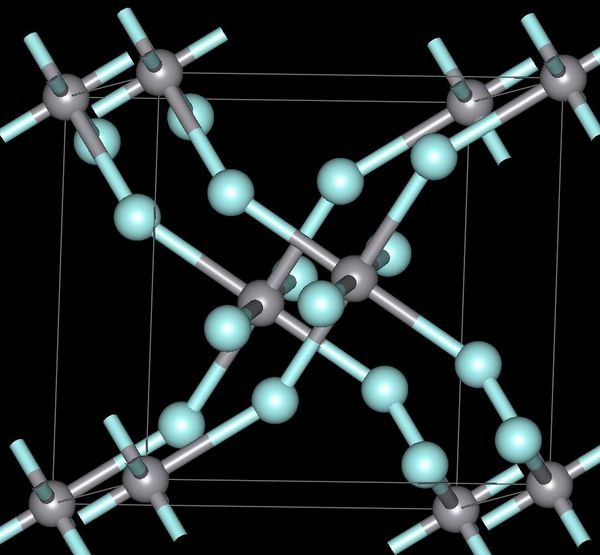
3D model of vanadium(IV) fluoride
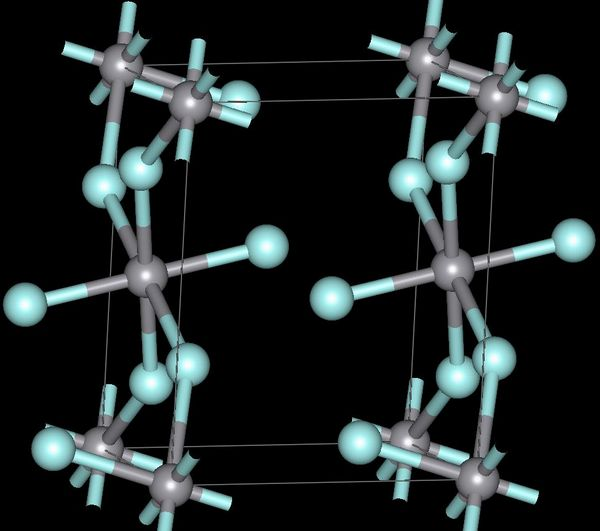
3D model of vanadium(IV) fluoride

Names
- IUPAC name vanadium tetrafluoride

Identifiers
CAS Number	10049-16-8
3D model (JSmol)	Interactive image
ChemSpider	11226730
ECHA InfoCard	100.030.143
EC Number	233-171-7
PubChem CID	44717705
UNII	M372NC1A3B
UN number	UN2923
CompTox Dashboard (EPA)	DTXSID50894991
- InChI: InChI=1S/4FH.V/h4*1H;/q;;;;+4/p-4 Key: JTWLHYPUICYOLE-UHFFFAOYSA-J; InChI=1/4FH.V/h4*1H;/q;;;;+4/p-4 Key: JTWLHYPUICYOLE-XBHQNQODAC
- SMILES: [V+4].[F-].[F-].[F-].[F-]

Properties
Chemical formula	F_{4}V
Molar mass	126.9351 g·mol^{−1}
Appearance	Lime green powder, hygroscopic
Odor	Odorless
Density	3.15 g/cm^{3} (20 °C); 2.975 g/cm^{3} (23 °C)
Melting point	325 °C (617 °F; 598 K) at 760 mmHg decomposes
Boiling point	Sublimes
Solubility in water	Very soluble
Solubility	Soluble in acetone, acetic acid Very slightly soluble in SO_{2}Cl_{2}, alcohols, CHCl_{3}

Structure
Crystal structure	Monoclinic, mP10
Space group	P2_{1}/c, No. 14

Thermochemistry
Std molar entropy (S^{⦵}_{298})	126 J/mol·K
Std enthalpy of formation (Δ_{f}H^{⦵}_{298})	−1412 kJ/mol
Gibbs free energy (Δ_{f}G^{⦵})	−1312 kJ/mol

Hazards
- Occupational safety and health (OHS/OSH)
Eye hazards	Causes serious damage
Skin hazards	Causes burns
- GHS labelling
Pictograms	(GHS05: Corrosive) (GHS06: Toxic)
Signal word	Danger
Hazard statements	H300, H314, H330
Precautionary statements	P260, P301+P310, P303+P361+P353, P304+P340, P305+P351+P338, P320, P330, P405, P501
- Except where otherwise noted, data are given for materials in their standard state (at 25 °C [77 °F], 100 kPa). verify (what is ?) Infobox references

Vanadium(IV) fluoride (VF_{4}) is an inorganic compound of vanadium and fluorine. It is paramagnetic yellow-brown solid that is very hygroscopic. Unlike the corresponding vanadium tetrachloride, the tetrafluoride is not volatile because it adopts a polymeric structure. It decomposes before melting.

== Preparation and reactions ==
VF_{4} can be prepared by treating VCl_{4} with HF:

VCl_{4} + 4 HF → VF_{4} + 4 HCl

It was first prepared in this way.

It decomposes at 325 °C, undergoing disproportionation to the tri- and pentafluorides:

2 VF_{4} → VF_{3} + VF_{5}

== Structure ==
The structure of VF_{4} is related to that of SnF_{4}. Each vanadium centre is octahedral, surrounded by six fluoride ligands. Four of the fluoride centers bridge to adjacent vanadium centres.

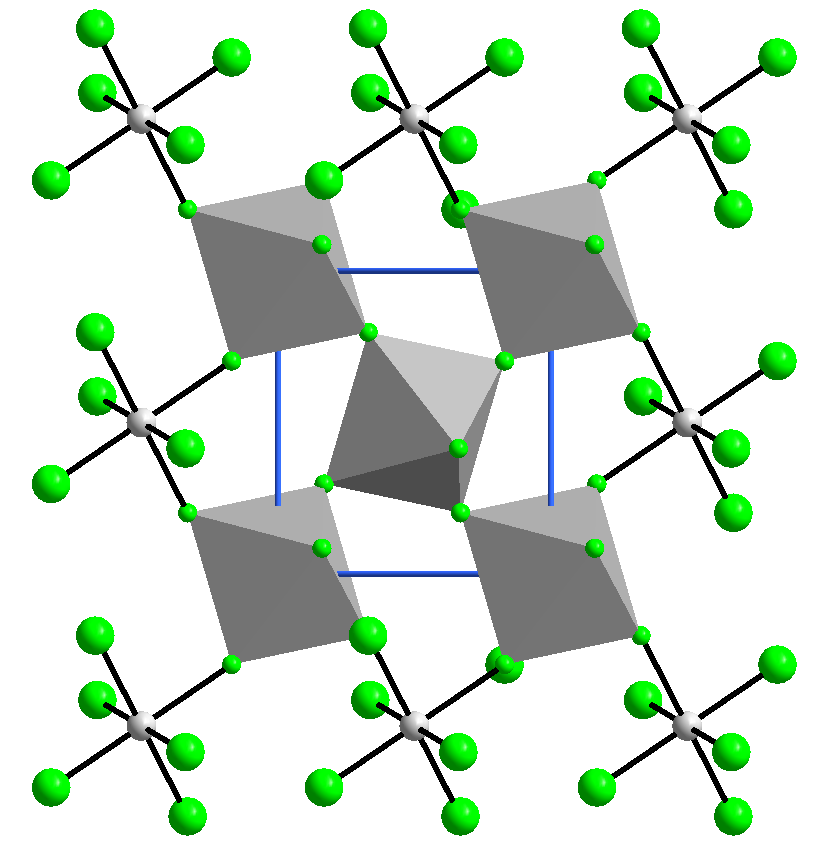
V^{4+}; F^{−}
