= Vanadium tetrachloride =

Chemical reagent used to produce other vanadium compounds

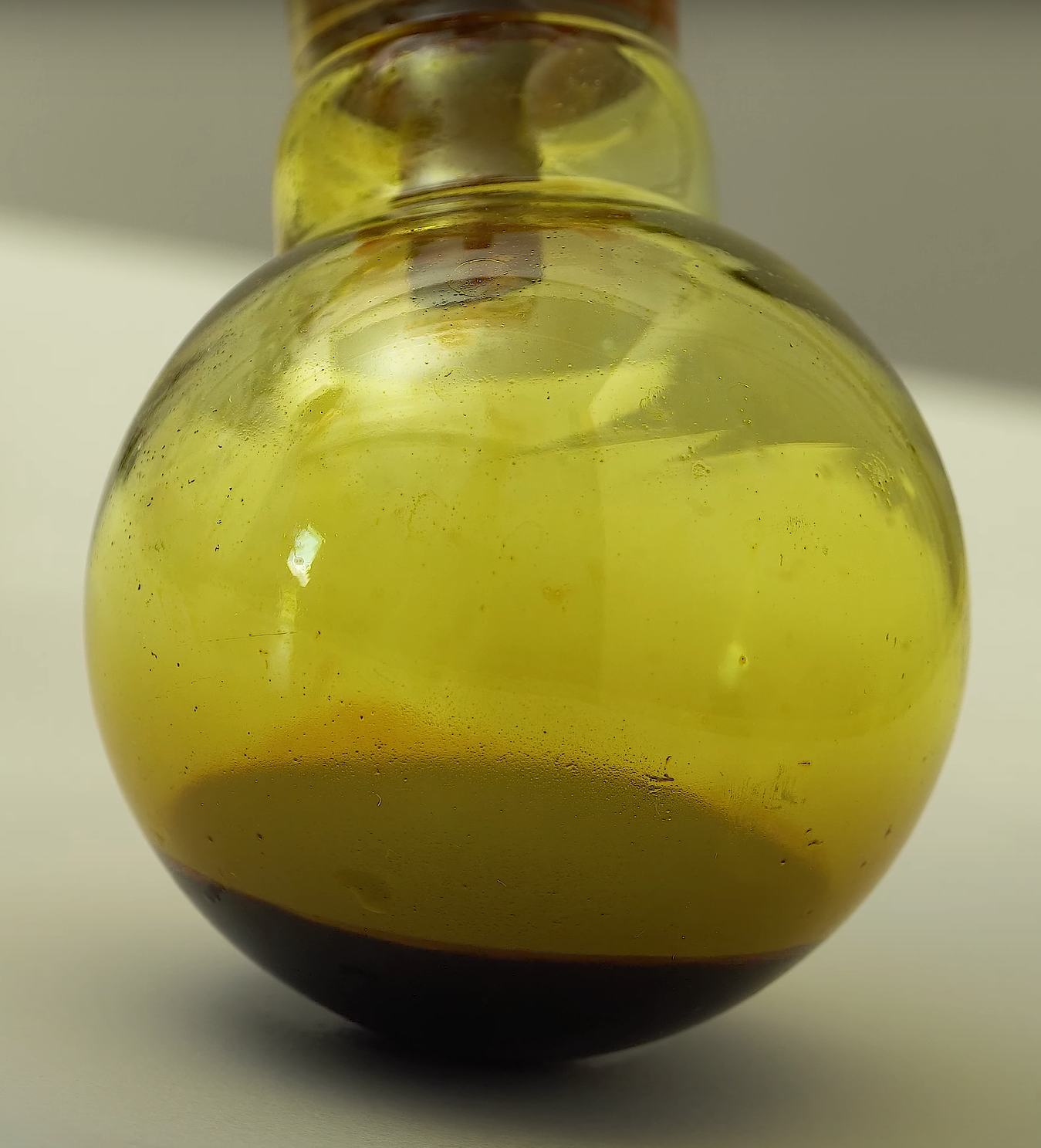

Structural formula of the vanadium tetrachloride molecule
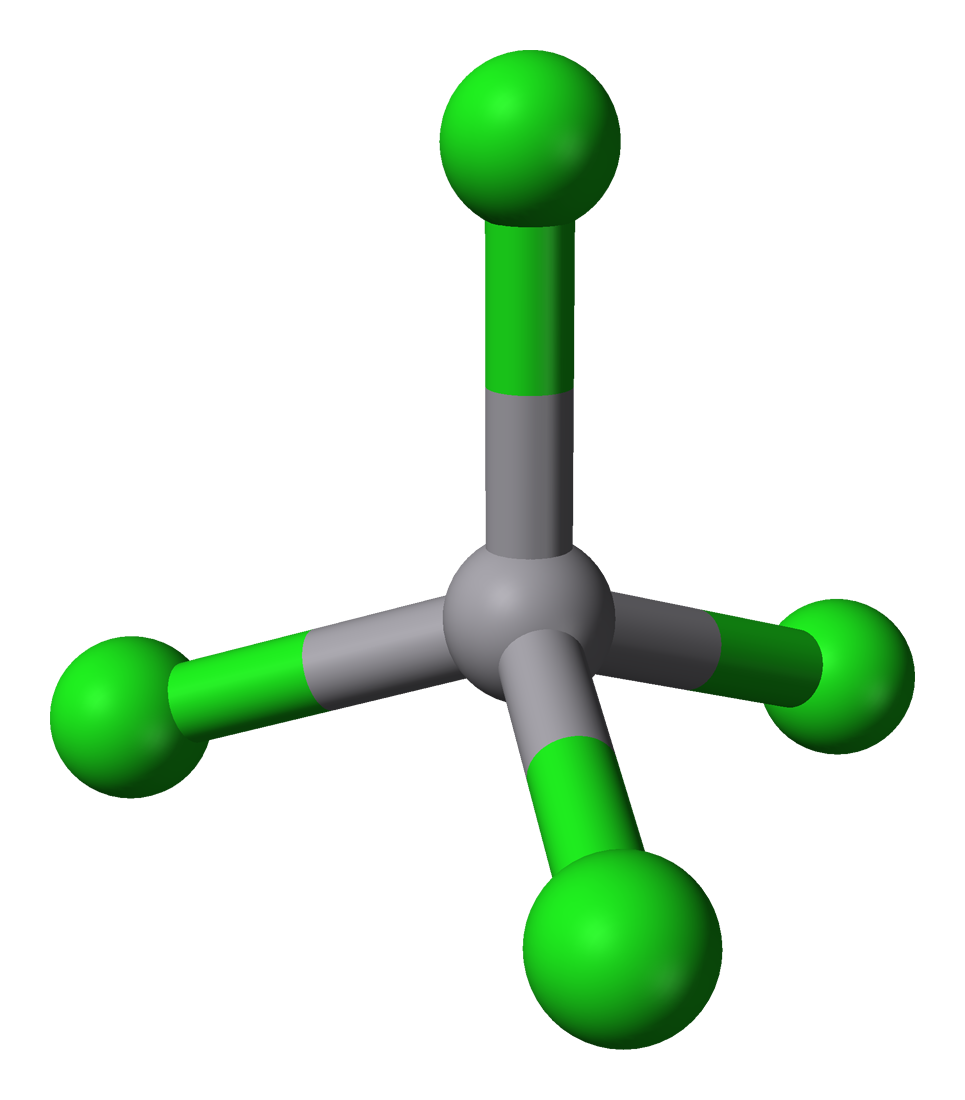
3D model of the vanadium tetrachloride molecule

Names
- IUPAC names Vanadium tetrachloride Vanadium(IV) chloride

Identifiers
CAS Number	7632-51-1
3D model (JSmol)	Interactive image
ChemSpider	19956660
ECHA InfoCard	100.028.692
EC Number	231-561-1
PubChem CID	24273
RTECS number	YW2625000
UNII	2I17MGM5YJ
CompTox Dashboard (EPA)	DTXSID0064757
- InChI: InChI=1S/4ClH.2V/h4*1H;;/q;;;;2*+2/p-4 Key: UNUHYFVFMNJHJW-UHFFFAOYSA-J; InChI=1/4ClH.2V/h4*1H;;/q;;;;2*+2/p-4 Key: UNUHYFVFMNJHJW-XBHQNQODAR
- SMILES: Cl[V](Cl)(Cl)Cl

Properties
Chemical formula	VCl_{4}
Molar mass	192.75 g/mol
Appearance	bright red liquid, moisture sensitive
Odor	pungent
Density	1.816 g/cm^{3}, liquid
Melting point	−24.5 °C (−12.1 °F; 248.7 K)
Boiling point	148 °C (298 °F; 421 K)
Solubility in water	decomposes
Solubility	soluble in CH_{2}Cl_{2}
Vapor pressure	7.9 Pa
Magnetic susceptibility (χ)	+1130.0·10^{−6} cm^{3}/mol

Structure
Coordination geometry	tetrahedral
Dipole moment	0 D

Hazards
- Occupational safety and health (OHS/OSH)
Main hazards	toxic; oxidizer; hydrolyzes to release HCl
- GHS labelling
Pictograms	(GHS05: Corrosive) (GHS08: Health hazard)
Signal word	Danger
Hazard statements	H301, H311, H314, H331
Precautionary statements	P260, P262, P264, P270, P271, P280, P301+P316, P301+P330+P331, P302+P352, P302+P361+P354, P304+P340, P305+P354+P338, P316, P321, P330, P361+P364, P363, P403+P233, P405, P501
NFPA 704 (fire diamond)	3 0 2 W
- Lethal dose or concentration (LD, LC)
LD_{50} (median dose)	160 mg/kg (rat, oral)

Related compounds
Other anions	Vanadium tetrafluoride; Vanadium disulfide; Vanadium tetrabromide
Other cations	Titanium tetrachloride; Chromium tetrachloride; Niobium tetrachloride; Tantalum tetrachloride
Related compounds	Vanadium trichloride
- Except where otherwise noted, data are given for materials in their standard state (at 25 °C [77 °F], 100 kPa). verify (what is ?) Infobox references

Vanadium tetrachloride is the inorganic compound with the formula VCl_{4}. This reddish-brown liquid serves as a useful reagent for the preparation of other vanadium compounds.

== Synthesis, bonding, basic properties ==
With one more valence electron than diamagnetic TiCl_{4}, VCl_{4} is a paramagnetic liquid. It is one of only a few paramagnetic compounds that is liquid at room temperature.

VCl_{4} is prepared by chlorination of vanadium metal. VCl_{5} does not form in this reaction; Cl_{2} lacks the oxidizing power to attack VCl_{4}. VCl_{5} can however be prepared indirectly from VF_{5} at −78 °C.

== Reactions ==
Consistent with its high oxidizing power, VCl_{4} reacts with HBr at −50 °C to produce VBr_{3}. The reaction proceeds via VBr_{4}, which releases Br_{2} during warming to room temperature.

2 VCl_{4} + 8 HBr → 2 VBr_{3} + 8 HCl + Br_{2}

VCl_{4} forms adducts with many donor ligands, for example, VCl_{4}(THF)_{2}.

It is the precursor to vanadocene dichloride.

=== Organic chemistry ===
In organic synthesis, VCl_{4} is used for the oxidative coupling of phenols. For example, it converts phenol into a mixture of 4,4'-, 2,4'-, and 2,2'-biphenols:

2 C_{6}H_{5}OH + 2 VCl_{4} → HOC_{6}H_{4}–C_{6}H_{4}OH + 2 VCl_{3} + 2 HCl

== Applications ==
VCl_{4} is a catalyst for the polymerization of alkenes, especially those useful in the rubber industry. The underlying technology is related to Ziegler–Natta catalysis, which involves the intermediacy of vanadium alkyls.
