= Vanadium(V) chloride =

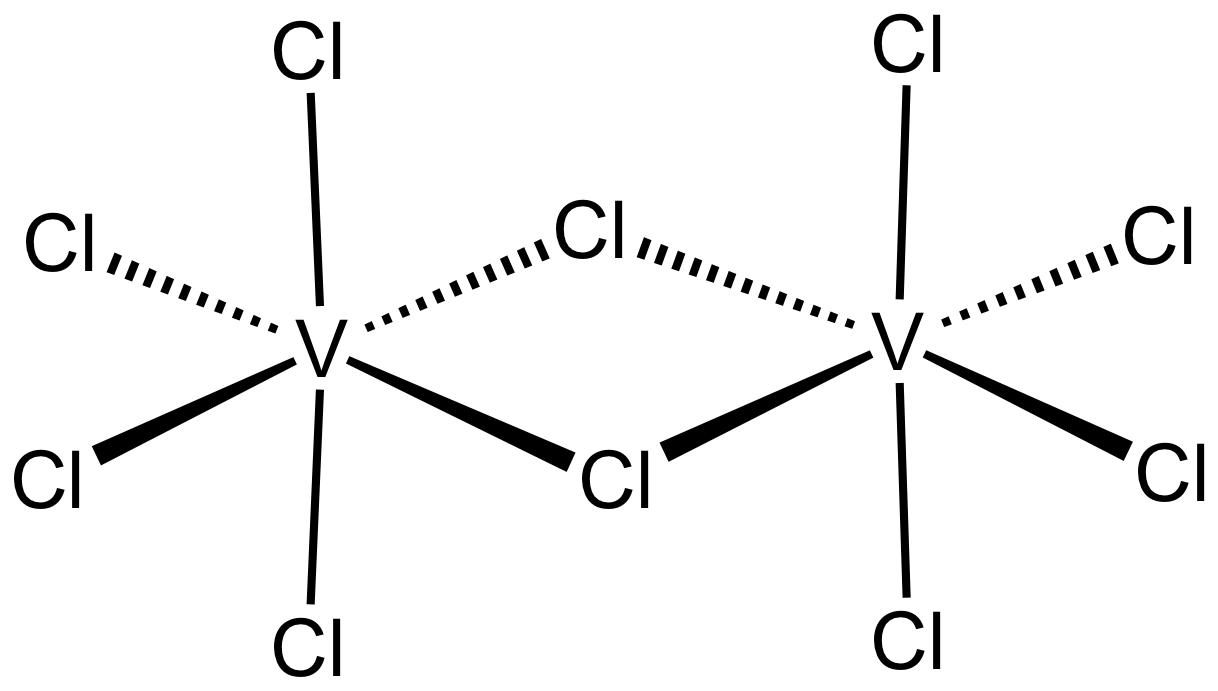

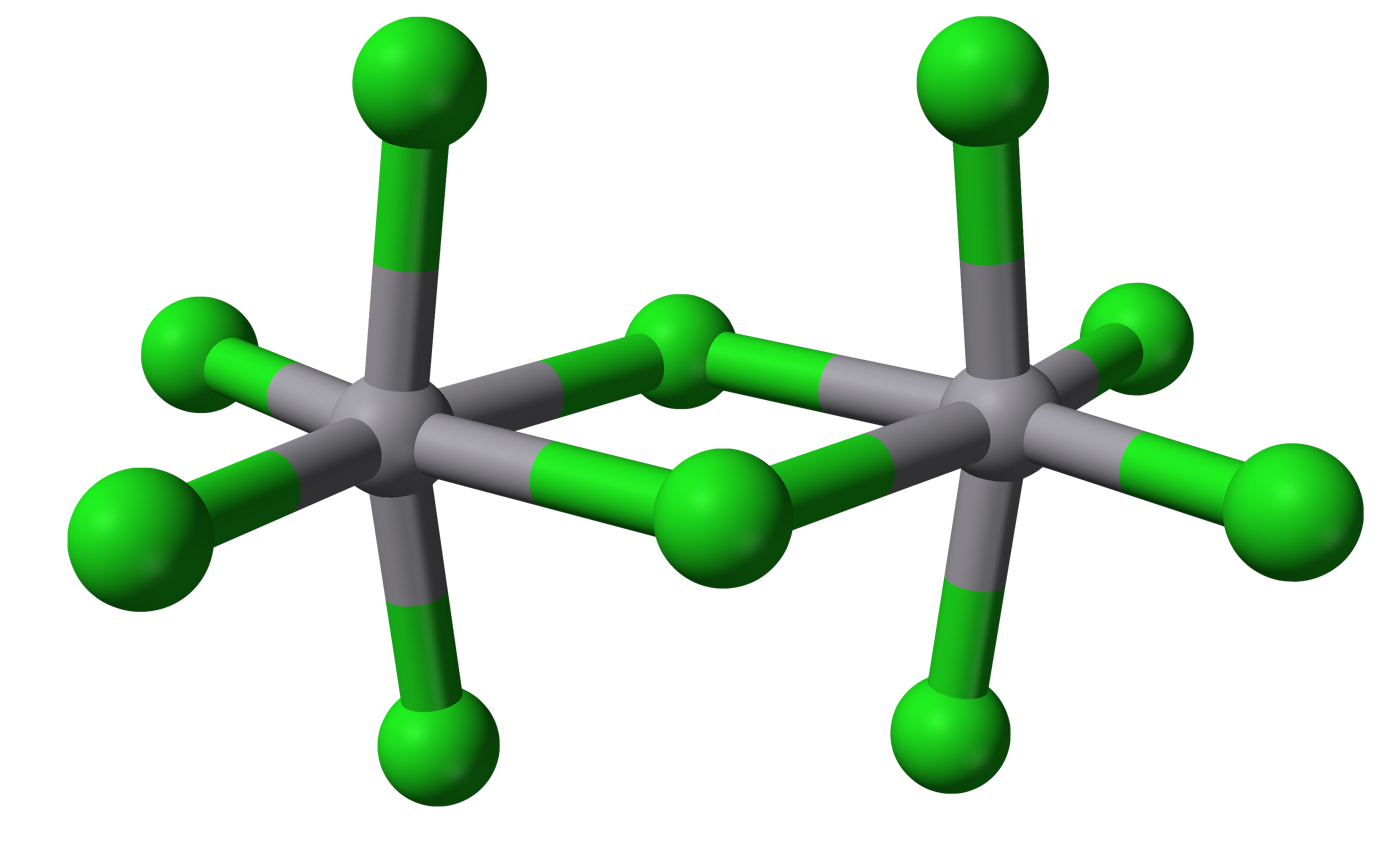

Names
- Other names vanadium pentachloride

Identifiers
CAS Number	1421358-80-6
3D model (JSmol)	monomer: Interactive image; dimer: Interactive image
PubChem CID	13643901
- InChI: InChI=1S/5ClH.V/h5*1H;/q;;;;;+5/p-5 Key: RPESBQCJGHJMTK-UHFFFAOYSA-I
- SMILES: monomer: Cl[V](Cl)(Cl)(Cl)Cl; dimer: Cl[V-]1(Cl)(Cl)(Cl)[Cl+][V-]([Cl+]1)(Cl)(Cl)(Cl)Cl

Properties
Chemical formula	Cl_{10}V_{2}
Molar mass	456.38 g·mol^{−1}
Appearance	black solid
Density	2.69 g/cm^{3}
Melting point	−10 °C (14 °F; 263 K) (decomposes)
- Except where otherwise noted, data are given for materials in their standard state (at 25 °C [77 °F], 100 kPa). Infobox references

Vanadium(V) chloride is the inorganic compound with the formula VCl_{5}. It is a black diamagnetic solid. The molecules adopt a bioctahedral structure similar to that of niobium(V) chloride.

== Preparation and reactions ==
Chlorine cannot oxidise vanadium(IV); chlorination of vanadium metal will yield only vanadium(IV) chloride. Vanadium(V) chloride is instead prepared from vanadium pentafluoride with excess boron trichloride as a chlorinating agent:

2 VF_{5} + 10 BCl_{3} → [VCl_{5}]_{2} + 10 BF_{2}Cl

It is unstable at room temperature, releasing gaseous chlorine and giving vanadium(IV) chloride:

[VCl_{5}]_{2} → 2 VCl_{4} + Cl_{2}

In contrast, the heavier analogues NbCl_{5} and TaCl_{5} are stable and not particularly oxidizing.
