= Vanadium(III) fluoride =

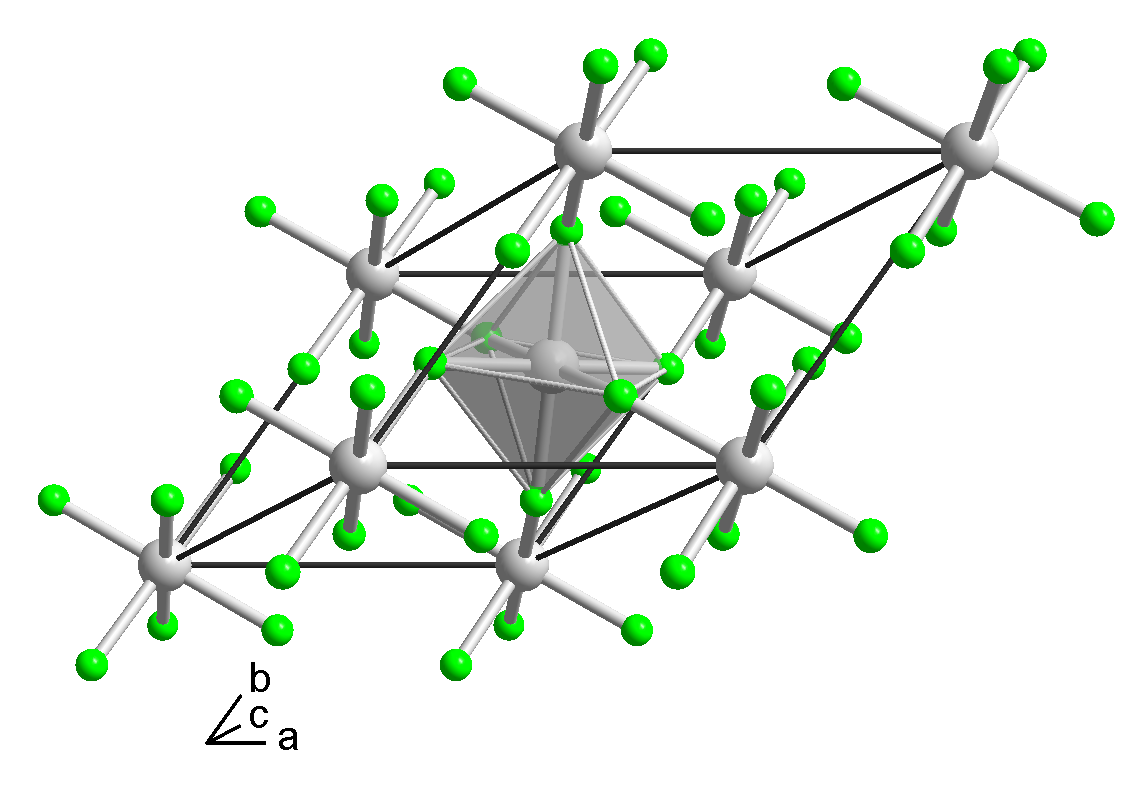

Names
- Other names Vanadium fluoride, Vanadium trifluoride

Identifiers
CAS Number	10049-12-4
3D model (JSmol)	Interactive image
ChemSpider	16057827
ECHA InfoCard	100.030.141
PubChem CID	66230
UNII	O3S3Z32R8P
CompTox Dashboard (EPA)	DTXSID50894890
- InChI: InChI=1S/3FH.V/h3*1H;/q;;;+3/p-3 Key: PASVSMBJEYQYSN-UHFFFAOYSA-K; InChI=1/3FH.V/h3*1H;/q;;;+3/p-3 Key: PASVSMBJEYQYSN-DFZHHIFOAM
- SMILES: [V+3].[F-].[F-].[F-]

Properties
Chemical formula	F_{3}V
Molar mass	107.9367 g·mol^{−1}
Appearance	Yellow-green powder (anhydrous); Green powder (trihydrate)
Density	3.363 g/cm^{3}
Melting point	1,395 °C (2,543 °F; 1,668 K) at 760 mmHg (anhydrous); ~ 100 °C (212 °F; 373 K) at 760 mmHg (trihydrate) decomposes
Boiling point	Sublimes
Solubility in water	Insoluble
Solubility	Insoluble in EtOH
Magnetic susceptibility (χ)	2.757·10^{−3} cm^{3}/mol

Structure
Crystal structure	Rhombohedral, hR24
Space group	R3̅c, No. 167
Point group	3̅ 2/m
Lattice constant	a = 5.17 Å, c = 13.402 Å α = 90°, β = 90°, γ = 120°

Hazards
- GHS labelling
Pictograms	(GHS05: Corrosive) (GHS06: Toxic)
Signal word	Danger
Hazard statements	H301, H311, H314, H331
Precautionary statements	P261, P280, P301+P310, P305+P351+P338, P310
NFPA 704 (fire diamond)	3 0 2

Related compounds
Other anions	Vanadium(III) chloride Vanadium(III) oxide Vanadium(III) nitride
Other cations	Vanadium(IV) fluoride
- Except where otherwise noted, data are given for materials in their standard state (at 25 °C [77 °F], 100 kPa). verify (what is ?) Infobox references

Vanadium(III) fluoride is the chemical compound with the formula VF_{3}. It is a yellow-green crystalline solid with hexacoordinate vanadium atoms and bridging fluorine atoms. The magnetic moment indicates the presence of two unpaired electrons. Similar to other transition-metal fluorides (such as MnF_{2}), it exhibits magnetic ordering at low temperatures (e.g. V_{2}F_{6}.4H_{2}O orders below 12 K).

== Preparation ==
Vanadium(III) fluoride is obtained in a two-step procedure from V_{2}O_{3}.

The first step entails conversion to the hexafluorovanadate(III) salt using ammonium bifluoride:

V_{2}O_{3} + 6 (NH_{4})HF_{2} → 2 (NH_{4})_{3}VF_{6} + 3 H_{2}O

In the second step, the hexafluorovanadate is thermally decomposed.

(NH_{4})_{3}VF_{6} → 3 NH_{3} + 3 HF + VF_{3}

The thermal decomposition of ammonium salts is a relatively common method for the preparation of inorganic solids.

It can also be prepared by treatment of V_{2}O_{3} with HF.

== General references ==
- Greenwood, Norman N.; Earnshaw, Alan (1997). Chemistry of the Elements (2nd ed.). Butterworth-Heinemann. doi:10.1016/C2009-0-30414-6. ISBN 978-0-08-037941-8.
