= Vanadium(II) fluoride =

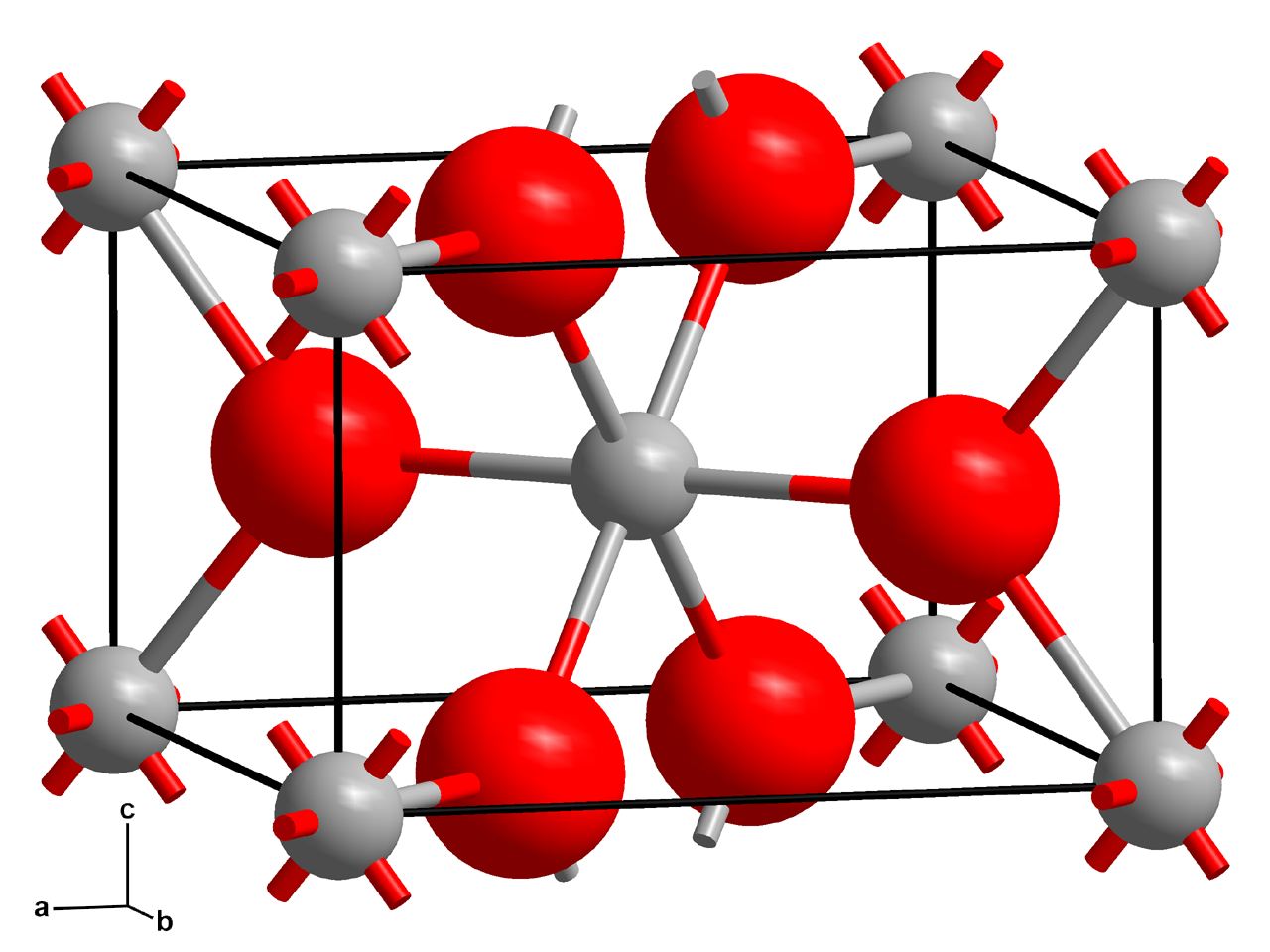

Names
- Other names Vanadium(II) fluoride

Identifiers
CAS Number	13842-80-3
3D model (JSmol)	Interactive image
PubChem CID	101602874
- InChI: InChI=1S/2FH.V/h2*1H;/q;;+2/p-2 Key: XHZLWOBYMWIKHM-UHFFFAOYSA-L
- SMILES: [F-].[F-].[V+2]

Properties
Chemical formula	F_{2}V
Molar mass	88.9383 g·mol^{−1}
Appearance	deep blue crystals
Density	3.954 g/cm^{3}
Solubility in water	soluble in water, forms [V(H_{2}O)_{6}]^{2+}
- Except where otherwise noted, data are given for materials in their standard state (at 25 °C [77 °F], 100 kPa). Infobox references

Vanadium(II) fluoride is a fluoride of vanadium, with the chemical formula of VF_{2}. It forms blue crystals.

== Structure ==
Vanadium(II) fluoride crystallizes in the tetragonal crystal system with space group P4_{2}/mnm (No. 136). Its lattice constants are a = 480.4 pm and c = 323.7 pm.

== Preparation ==
Vanadium(II) fluoride can be produced by the reduction of vanadium trifluoride by hydrogen in a hydrogen fluoride atmosphere at 1150 °C:

2 VF_{3} + H_{2} → 2 VF_{2} + 2 HF

== Reactions ==
Vanadium(II) fluoride is a strong reducing agent that can reduce nitrogen to hydrazine in the presence of magnesium hydroxide.

It dissolves in water to form [V(H_{2}O)_{6}]^{2+} ions.

V^{2+} + 6 H_{2}O → [V(H_{2}O)_{6}]^{2+}
