= Ruthenium(III) iodide =

Names
- Other names Ruthenium triiodide

Identifiers
| CAS Number | 715652-38-3 |
| 3D model (JSmol) | Interactive image; Interactive image |
| ChemSpider | 75623 |
| ECHA InfoCard | 100.034.226 |
| EC Number | 237-664-8 |
| PubChem CID | 83802 |
| CompTox Dashboard (EPA) | DTXSID90930261 |
- InChI: InChI=1S/3HI.Ru/h3*1H;/q;;;+3/p-3 Key: LJZVDOUZSMHXJH-UHFFFAOYSA-K
- SMILES: I[Ru](I)I; [I-].[I-].[I-].[Ru+3]

Properties
| Chemical formula | RuI_{3} |
| Density | 5.25 g cm^{−3} |
| Solubility in water | sparingly soluble |

Structure
| Crystal structure | hexagonal |

Thermochemistry
| Std molar entropy (S^{⦵}_{298}) | −247 J mol^{−1} K^{−1} |
| Std enthalpy of formation (Δ_{f}H^{⦵}_{298}) | −159 kJ mol^{−1} |

Related compounds
| Other anions | Ruthenium(III) fluoride Ruthenium(III) chloride Ruthenium(III) bromide |
| Other cations | Iron(III) iodide Osmium(III) iodide Technetium(III) iodide Rhodium(III) iodide |
- Except where otherwise noted, data are given for materials in their standard state (at 25 °C [77 °F], 100 kPa). Infobox references

Ruthenium(III) iodide is a chemical compound containing ruthenium and iodine with the formula RuI_{3}. It is a black solid.

== Structure ==
Ruthenium(III) iodide adopts an extended structure with octahedral coordination geometry at ruthenium. There is some doubt about the characterisation of ruthenium(III) iodide and it may be an oxohalide or a hydroxyhalide.

== Preparation ==
Ruthenium(III) iodide can be prepared in several ways.

The reaction of ruthenium tetroxide with aqueous hydroiodic acid:

RuO_{4} + excess HI → RuI_{3}

The thermal decomposition of pentaammineruthenium(III) iodide:

Ru(NH_{3})_{5}I_{3} → RuI_{3} + 5 NH_{3}

The salt metathesis reaction of hydrated ruthenium(III) chloride with potassium iodide in aqueous solution:

RuCl_{3}·xH_{2}O + 3 KI → RuI_{3} + 3 KCl + xH_{2}O

Direct combination of the elements has been reported to succeed under some conditions (350 °C) but not others (500 °C and 20 atm):

2 Ru + 3 I_{2} → 2 RuI_{3}
