= Ruthenium fluoride =

Ruthenium fluoride may refer to:

- Ruthenium(III) fluoride (ruthenium trifluoride), RuF_{3}
- Ruthenium(IV) fluoride (ruthenium tetrafluoride), RuF_{4}
- Ruthenium(V) fluoride (ruthenium pentafluoride), RuF_{5}
- Ruthenium(VI) fluoride (ruthenium hexafluoride), RuF_{6}
