= Iron fluoride =

Iron fluoride may refer to:

- Iron(II) fluoride (ferrous fluoride, FeF_{2}), a white solid
- Iron(II,III) fluoride (Fe_{2}F_{5})
- Iron(III) fluoride (ferric fluoride, FeF_{3}), a pale green solid
