= Rhodium fluoride =

Rhodium fluoride may refer to:

- Rhodium(III) fluoride (Rhodium trifluoride), RhF_{3}
- Rhodium(IV) fluoride (Rhodium tetrafluoride), RhF_{4}
- Rhodium(V) fluoride (Rhodium pentafluoride), RhF_{5}
- Rhodium(VI) fluoride (Rhodium hexafluoride), RhF_{6}
