= Iron bromide =

Iron bromide is a compound which comprises iron and bromine:

- Iron(II) bromide, ferrous bromide
- Iron(III) bromide, ferric bromide
