= Iron iodide =

Iron iodide may refer to:

- Iron(II) iodide (ferrous iodide, iron diiodide), FeI_{2}
- Iron(III) iodide (ferric iodide, iron triiodide), FeI_{3}, unstable
