= Ruthenium(III) fluoride =

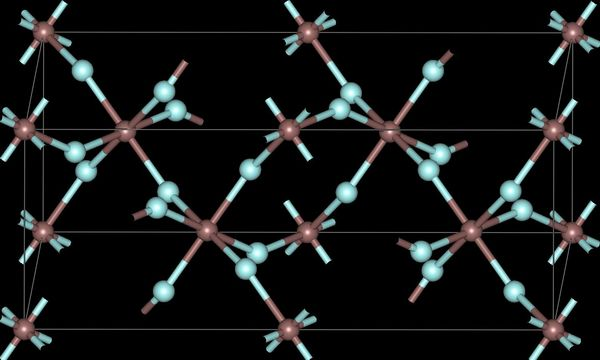

Identifiers
CAS Number	51621-05-7
3D model (JSmol)	Interactive image
ChemSpider	57450713
PubChem CID	12011490
CompTox Dashboard (EPA)	DTXSID50475784
- InChI: InChI=1S/3FH.Ru/h3*1H;/q;;;+3/p-3 Key: YRQNNUGOBNRKKW-UHFFFAOYSA-K
- SMILES: F[Ru](F)F

Properties
Chemical formula	F_{3}Ru
Molar mass	158.07 g·mol^{−1}
Appearance	dark brown solid
Density	5,36 g·cm^{−3}
Melting point	600 °C
Solubility in water	insoluble

Related compounds
Other anions	Ruthenium(III) chloride Ruthenium(III) bromide Ruthenium(III) iodide
Other cations	Rhodium(III) fluoride
Related compounds	Ruthenium(IV) fluoride Ruthenium(V) fluoride Ruthenium(VI) fluoride
- Except where otherwise noted, data are given for materials in their standard state (at 25 °C [77 °F], 100 kPa). Infobox references

Ruthenium(III) fluoride is a fluoride of ruthenium, with the chemical formula of RuF_{3}.

== Properties ==
Ruthenium(III) fluoride is a dark brown solid that is insoluble in water. It has a space group of R3̅c (No. 167).

== Preparation ==
Ruthenium(III) fluoride can be obtained from the reduction of ruthenium(V) fluoride by iodine at 250 °C:

5 RuF_{5} + I_{2} → 5 RuF_{3} + 2 IF_{5}
