= Tris(triphenylphosphine)rhodium carbonyl hydride =

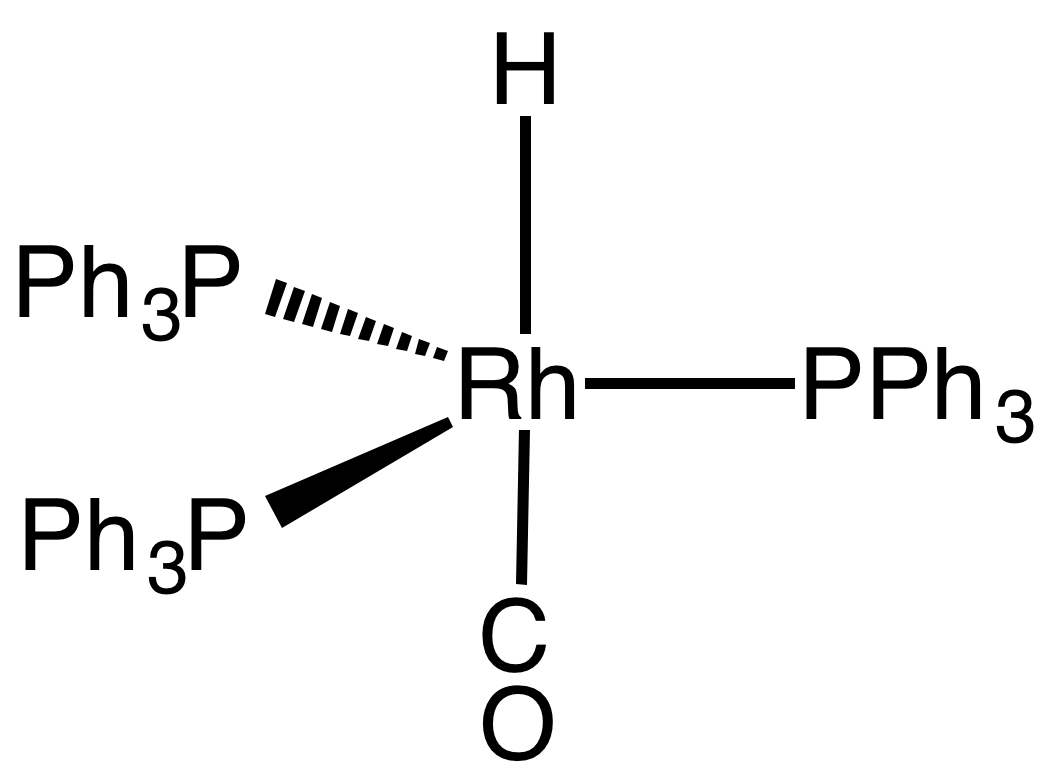

Identifiers
CAS Number	17185-29-4
3D model (JSmol)	Interactive image
ChemSpider	21171538
ECHA InfoCard	100.037.467
EC Number	241-230-3
PubChem CID	157050156
UNII	720P7594ZM
CompTox Dashboard (EPA)	DTXSID40904295
- InChI: InChI=1S/3C18H15P.CO.Rh.H/c3*1-4-10-16(11-5-1)19(17-12-6-2-7-13-17)18-14-8-3-9-15-18;1-2;;/h3*1-15H;;; Key: AACIZACVKFEETJ-UHFFFAOYSA-N
- SMILES: [C-]#[O+].C1=CC=C(C=C1)P(C2=CC=CC=C2)C3=CC=CC=C3.C1=CC=C(C=C1)P(C2=CC=CC=C2)C3=CC=CC=C3.C1=CC=C(C=C1)P(C2=CC=CC=C2)C3=CC=CC=C3.[RhH]

Properties
Chemical formula	C_{55}H_{46}OP_{3}Rh
Molar mass	918.78
Appearance	yellow solid
Melting point	172–174 °C (342–345 °F; 445–447 K) sealed capillary

Hazards
- GHS labelling
Pictograms	(GHS06: Toxic) (GHS07: Exclamation mark)
Signal word	Danger
Hazard statements	H301, H311, H315, H319, H331, H335
Precautionary statements	P261, P264, P270, P271, P280, P301+P310, P302+P352, P304+P340, P305+P351+P338, P311, P312, P321, P322, P330, P332+P313, P337+P313, P361, P362, P363, P403+P233, P405, P501
- Except where otherwise noted, data are given for materials in their standard state (at 25 °C [77 °F], 100 kPa). Infobox references

Carbonyl hydrido tris(triphenylphosphine)rhodium(I) [Carbonyl(hydrido)tris(triphenylphosphane)rhodium(I)] is an organorhodium compound with the formula [RhH(CO)(PPh_{3})_{3}] (Ph = C_{6}H_{5}). It is a yellow, benzene-soluble solid, which is used industrially for hydroformylation.

== Preparation ==
[RhH(CO)(PPh_{3})_{3}] was first prepared by the reduction of [RhCl(CO)(PPh_{3})_{2}], e.g. with sodium tetrahydroborate, or triethylamine and hydrogen, in ethanol in the presence of excess triphenylphosphine:

[RhCl(CO)(PPh_{3})_{2}] + NaBH_{4} + PPh_{3} → [RhH(CO)(PPh_{3})_{3}] + NaCl + BH_{3}

It can also be prepared from an aldehyde, rhodium trichloride and triphenylphosphine in basic alcoholic media.

== Structure ==
The complex adopts a trigonal bipyramidal geometry with trans CO and hydrido ligands, resulting in pseudo-C_{3v} symmetry. The Rh-P, Rh-C, and Rh-H distances are 2.32, 1.83, and 1.60 Å, respectively. This complex is one of a small number of stable pentacoordinate rhodium hydrides.

== Use in hydroformylation ==
This precatalyst was uncovered in attempts to use tris(triphenylphosphine)rhodium chloride as a hydroformylation catalyst. It was found that the complex would quickly carbonylate and that the catalytic activity of the resulting material was enhanced by a variety of additives but inhibited by halides. This inhibition did not occur in the presence of base, suggesting that the hydrido-complex represented the catalytic form of the complex.

=== Mechanistic considerations ===
[RhH(CO)(PPh_{3})_{3}] is a catalyst for the selective hydroformylation of 1-olefins to produce aldehydes at low pressures and mild temperatures. The selectivity for n-aldehydes increases in the presence of excess PPh_{3} and at low CO partial pressures. The first step in the hydroformylation process is the dissociative substitution of an alkene for a PPh_{3}. The migratory insertion of this 18-electron complex can result in either a primary or secondary rhodium alkyl. This step sets the regiochemistry of the product, however it is rapidly reversible. The 16-electron alkyl complex undergoes migratory insertion of a CO to form the coordinately unsaturated acyl. This species once again gives an 18-electron acyl complex. The last step involves β-H elimination via hydrogenolysis which results in the cleavage of the aldehyde product and regeneration of the rhodium catalyst.
