= Ammonium hexafluoroferrate =

Names
- IUPAC name Triazanium;hexafluoroiron(3-)
- Other names: Triammonium hexafluoroferrate(3-); Ammonium fluoroferrate(III); Ammonium hexafluoroferrate(III)

Identifiers
CAS Number	13815-28-6
3D model (JSmol)	Interactive image
ChemSpider	24491
PubChem CID	26287
CompTox Dashboard (EPA)	DTXSID70160504
- InChI: InChI=1S/6FH.Fe.3H3N/h6*1H;;3*1H3/q;;;;;;+3;;;/p-3 Key: UKKZLCVDDRMWPG-UHFFFAOYSA-K
- SMILES: [NH4+].[NH4+].[NH4+].F[Fe-3](F)(F)(F)(F)F

Properties
Chemical formula	F_{6}FeH_{12}N_{3}
Molar mass	223.952 g·mol^{−1}
Appearance	yellow-white crystals
Density	1.96 g/cm^{3}
- Except where otherwise noted, data are given for materials in their standard state (at 25 °C [77 °F], 100 kPa). Infobox references

Ammonium hexafluoroferrate is an inorganic compound with the chemical formula (NH_{4})_{3}FeF_{6}.

== Structure ==
Ammonium hexafluoroferrate is isomorphous with the analogous compounds of aluminum and trivalent titanium, vanadium, and chromium. It crystallizes in a cubic lattice.

== Synthesis ==
Ammonium hexafluoroferrate can be obtained by reacting ferric fluoride trihydrate and ammonium fluoride in water.

== Reactions ==
Upon heating, the compound loses two moles of ammonium fluoride, forming ammonium tetrafluoroferrate(III). Further heating results in the gradual loss of ammonium fluoride, the final products being iron(III) fluoride mixed with oxide.

The compound reacts with xenon difluoride to produce NH_{4}FeF_{4}, N_{2}, Xe, and HF.

== Uses ==
Ammonium hexafluoroferrate is used as a fire retardant.
