= Iron(III) iodide =

Names
- IUPAC name Iron(III) iodide
- Other names Ferric iodide

Identifiers
CAS Number	15600-49-4
3D model (JSmol)	Interactive image
ChemSpider	76688
PubChem CID	85017
CompTox Dashboard (EPA)	DTXSID50935338
- InChI: InChI=1S/Fe.3HI/h;3*1H/q+3;;;/p-3 Key: HEJPGFRXUXOTGM-UHFFFAOYSA-K
- SMILES: I[Fe](I)I

Properties
Chemical formula	FeI_{3}
Molar mass	436.56 g/mol
Appearance	Black solid
Solubility in water	decomposes
Solubility	sparingly soluble in dichloromethane

Related compounds
Other anions	FeF_{3}, FeCl_{3}, FeBr_{3}
Other cations	ScI_{3}, TiI_{3}, VI_{3}, MoI_{3}, WI_{3}, RhI_{3}, BiI_{3}
Related compounds	FeI_{2}
- Except where otherwise noted, data are given for materials in their standard state (at 25 °C [77 °F], 100 kPa). Infobox references

Iron(III) iodide is an inorganic compound with the chemical formula FeI_{3}. It is a thermodynamically unstable compound that is difficult to prepare. Nevertheless, iron(III) iodide has been synthesised in small quantities in the absence of air and water.

== Preparation ==
Iron(III) and iodide tend to undergo a redox reaction in which Fe^{3+} is reduced to Fe^{2+} and I^{−} is oxidised to I_{2}. This reaction can be avoided and iron(III) iodide can be synthesised by a photochemical reaction. Iron pentacarbonyl reacts with excess iodine in hexane under argon, releasing carbon monoxide and forming the complex diiodotetracarbonyliron(II), Fe(CO)_{4}I_{2}, as a light red solution.

Fe(CO)_{5} + I_{2} → Fe(CO)_{4}I_{2} + CO

This complex then undergoes oxidative photodecarbonylation at −20 °C in the presence of further iodine and actinic light. A black film of FeI_{3} is deposited as further carbon monoxide is evolved.

Fe(CO)_{4}I_{2} + ½I_{2} + hν → FeI_{3} + 4CO

== Reactivity ==
Iron(III) iodide is prone to light-induced decomposition to iron(II) iodide and iodine.

FeI_{3} + hν → FeI_{2} + ½I_{2}

Donor solvents such as tetrahydrofuran, acetonitrile, pyridine and water also promote this reaction: iron(III) iodide is extremely hygroscopic. It is sparingly soluble in dichloromethane. It reacts with iodide to form the tetraiodoferrate(III) ion.

FeI_{3} + I^{−} → FeI_{4}^{−}

Iron(III) iodide undergoes ligand exchange or metathesis with certain alkyl chlorides to reversibly form iron(III) chloride and the corresponding alkyl iodides.

FeI_{3} + 3 RCl ⇌ FeCl_{3} + 3 RI

Adducts of FeI_{3} are well known. An orange complex can be prepared from FeI_{2} and I_{2} in the presence of thiourea. Iron powder reacts with iodine-containing proligands to also give adducts of ferric iodide.

== See also ==
- Iron(II) iodide, FeI_{2}
