= Chlorobis(ethylene)rhodium dimer =

Identifiers
CAS Number	12081-16-2
3D model (JSmol)	Interactive image
ChemSpider	21241609
ECHA InfoCard	100.031.938
EC Number	235-145-0
PubChem CID	45357812
UNII	JF3CSZ2DN6
CompTox Dashboard (EPA)	DTXSID80923566
- InChI: InChI=1S/4C2H4.2ClH.2Rh/c4*1-2;;;;/h4*1-2H2;2*1H;;/p-2 Key: QPOCZCJMFQWGSP-UHFFFAOYSA-L
- SMILES: C=C.C=C.C=C.C=C.[Cl-].[Cl-].[Rh].[Rh]

Properties
Chemical formula	C_{8}H_{16}Cl_{2}Rh_{2}
Molar mass	388.93
Appearance	red solid

Hazards
- GHS labelling
Pictograms	(GHS07: Exclamation mark)
Signal word	Warning
Hazard statements	H315, H319
Precautionary statements	P264, P280, P302+P352, P305+P351+P338, P321, P332+P313, P337+P313, P362
- Except where otherwise noted, data are given for materials in their standard state (at 25 °C [77 °F], 100 kPa). Infobox references

Chlorobis(ethylene)rhodium dimer is an organorhodium compound with the formula Rh_{2}Cl_{2}(C_{2}H_{4})_{4}. Sometimes called Cramer's dimer (after Richard Cramer), it is a red-orange solid that is soluble in nonpolar organic solvents. The molecule consists of two bridging chloride ligands and four ethylene ligands. The ethylene ligands are labile and readily displaced even by other alkenes. A variety of homogeneous catalysts have been prepared from this complex.

== Preparation and reactions ==
The complex is prepared by treating an aqueous methanolic solution of hydrated rhodium trichloride with ethylene at room temperature. Rh(III) is reduced with oxidation of ethylene to acetaldehyde:

2 RhCl_{3}(H_{2}O)_{3} + 6 C_{2}H_{4} → Rh_{2}Cl_{2}(C_{2}H_{4})_{4} + 2 CH_{3}CHO + 4 HCl + 4 H_{2}O

Reflecting the lability of its ligands, the complex does not tolerate recrystallization.

The complex reacts slowly with water to give acetaldehyde. With HCl, it gives RhCl_{2}(C_{2}H_{2})_{2}^{−}. Rh_{2}Cl_{2}(C_{2}H_{4})_{4} catalyzes the dimerization of ethylene to 1-butene.

Carbonylation affords rhodium carbonyl chloride. Treatment with acetylacetone and aqueous KOH gives Rh(acac)(C_{2}H_{4})_{2}.
