= Dicarbonyl(acetylacetonato)rhodium(I) =

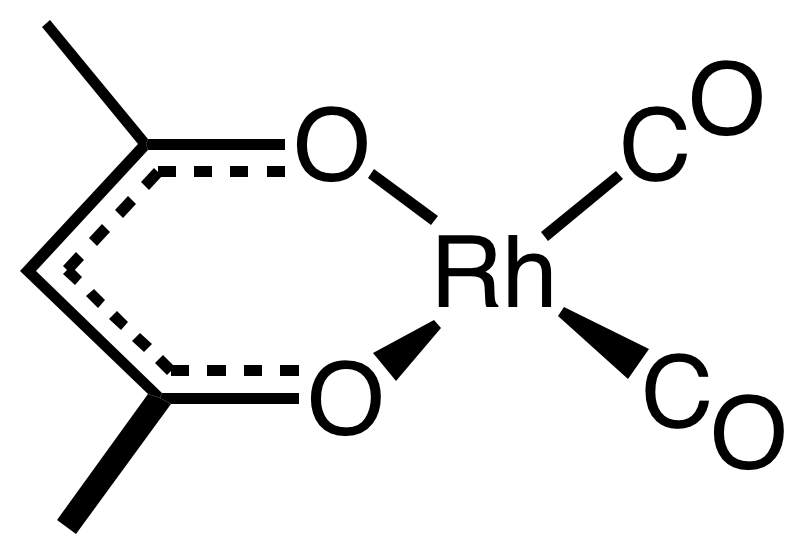

Names
- IUPAC name Dicarbonyl(acetylacetonato)rhodium(I)
- Systematic IUPAC name Dicarbonyl[(Z)-4-oxopent-2-en-2-olato-κ^{2}O,O′]rhodium(I)
- Other names Rhodium acetylacetonate dicarbonyl

Identifiers
CAS Number	14874-82-9
3D model (JSmol)	coordination form: Interactive image; ionic form: Interactive image
ChemSpider	9055018
ECHA InfoCard	100.035.392
PubChem CID	10879749
UNII	H77Y3D36FX
- InChI: InChI=1S/C5H8O2.2CO.Rh/c1-4(6)3-5(2)7;2*1-2;/h3,6H,1-2H3;;;/b4-3+;;; Key: GGRQQHADVSXBQN-FHJHGPAASA-N
- SMILES: coordination form: CC(=C[C-](C)O1)O[Rh+]1(C#[O])C#[O]; ionic form: C/C(=C/C(=O)C)/[O-].[C-]#[O+].[C-]#[O+].[Rh+]

Properties
Chemical formula	C_{7}H_{7}O_{4}Rh
Molar mass	258.034 g·mol^{−1}
Appearance	green solid
Density	1.95 g/cm^{3}
Melting point	155 °C (311 °F; 428 K)

Structure
Crystal structure	triclinic
Space group	P̅_{1}
Lattice constant	a = 6.5189 Å, b = 7.7614 Å, c = 9.205 Å α = 106.04°, β = 91.15°, γ = 100.21° at 20°C
Lattice volume (V)	439.3 Å^{3}
Formula units (Z)	2
- Except where otherwise noted, data are given for materials in their standard state (at 25 °C [77 °F], 100 kPa). Infobox references

Dicarbonyl(acetylacetonato)rhodium(I) is an organorhodium compound with the formula Rh(O_{2}C_{5}H_{7})(CO)_{2}. The compound consists of two CO ligands and an acetylacetonate. It is a dark green solid that dissolves in acetone and benzene, giving yellow solutions. The compound is used as a precursor to homogeneous catalysts.

== Structure ==
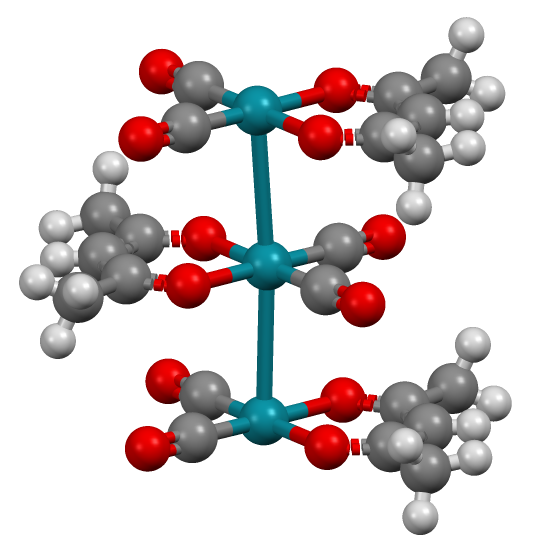
Portion of the lattice of Rh(acac)(CO)_{2} showing the "stacking" of the individual planar units through Rh---Rh interactions.

The complex adopts square planar molecular geometry. The molecules stack with Rh---Rh distances of about 326 pm. As such, it is representative of a linear chain compound.

== Preparation ==
It is prepared by treating rhodium carbonyl chloride with sodium acetylacetonate in the presence of base:

[(CO)_{2}RhCl]_{2} + 2 NaO_{2}C_{5}H_{7} → 2 Rh(O_{2}C_{5}H_{7})(CO)_{2} + 2 NaCl
