= Ruthenium(IV) fluoride =

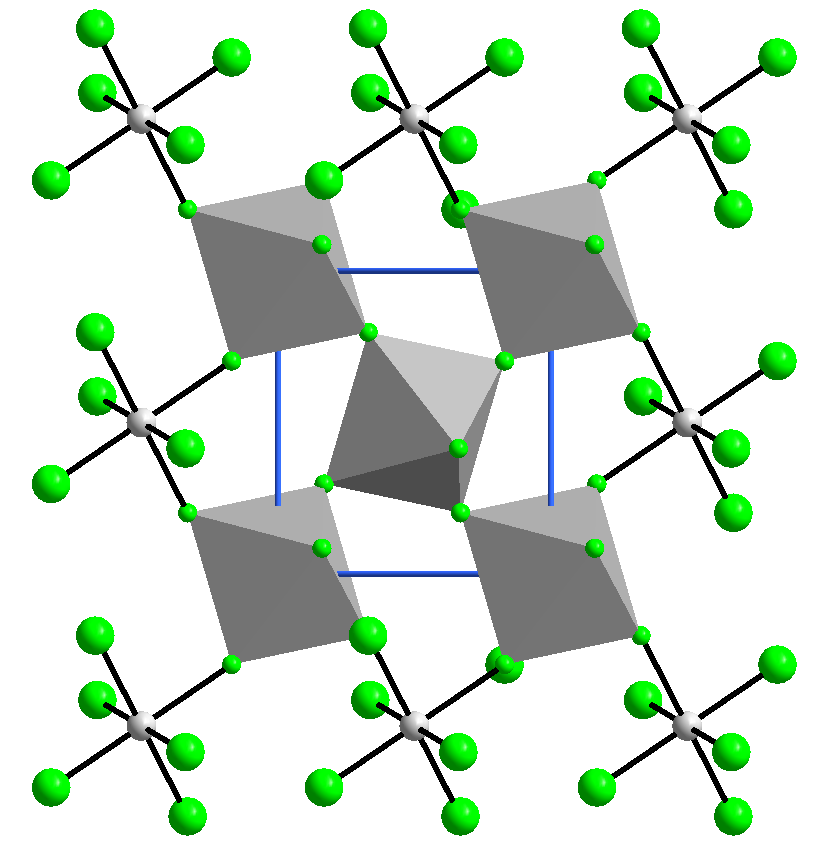

Names
- Other names Ruthenium tetrafluoride

Identifiers
CAS Number	71500-16-8
3D model (JSmol)	Interactive image
ChemSpider	146211
EC Number	238-533-8
PubChem CID	167109
- InChI: InChI=1S/4FH.Ru/h4*1H;/q;;;;+4/p-4 Key: CBIYWHCPXHKZME-UHFFFAOYSA-J
- SMILES: [F-].[F-].[F-].[F-].[Ru+4]

Properties
Chemical formula	F_{4}Ru
Molar mass	177.06 g·mol^{−1}
Appearance	pink crystals
Solubility in water	reacts with water

Structure
Crystal structure	monoclinic
Space group	P2_{1}/n
Lattice constant	a = 560.7 pm, b = 494.6 pm, c = 514.3 pm α = 90°, β = 121.27°, γ = 90°
Lattice volume (V)	128.3 Å^{3}
Formula units (Z)	2 units per cell

Related compounds
Related compounds	Rhodium tetrafluoride, platinum tetrafluoride
- Except where otherwise noted, data are given for materials in their standard state (at 25 °C [77 °F], 100 kPa). Infobox references

Ruthenium(IV) fluoride is a binary inorganic compound of ruthenium and fluorine with the formula RuF_{4}.

== Physical properties ==
RuF_{4} in the solid state is polymeric, with a three-dimensional structure of corrugated layers containing RuF_{6} octahedra joined by shared fluorine atoms. The crystalline structure is similar to that of vanadium tetrafluoride and is monoclinic.

Ruthenium tetrafluoride is an extremely reactive compound which darkens immediately upon contact with moisture, and reacts violently with water to deposit ruthenium dioxide. The compound can be stored in glass containers, which are, however, attacked if the sample is heated above 280 °C.

== Synthesis ==
The compound was first prepared in 1963 by Holloway and Peacock, who obtained a yellow solid by reducing ruthenium pentafluoride with iodine, using iodine pentafluoride as a solvent.

10RuF_{5} + I_{2} → 10RuF_{4} + 2IF_{5}

Subsequent studies have indicated that RuF_{4} produced by this way is impure. The pure, pink compound was isolated for the first time in 1992 by reacting KRuF_{6} with AsF_{5} at 20 °C in anhydrous hydrofluoric acid, with strict exclusion of water and oxygen. This synthesis exploits the very strong fluoride ion accepting capabilities of the Lewis acid AsF_{5}.

K_{2}RuF_{6} + 2AsF_{5} → RuF_{4} + 2KAsF_{6}
