= Rhodium(III) chloride =

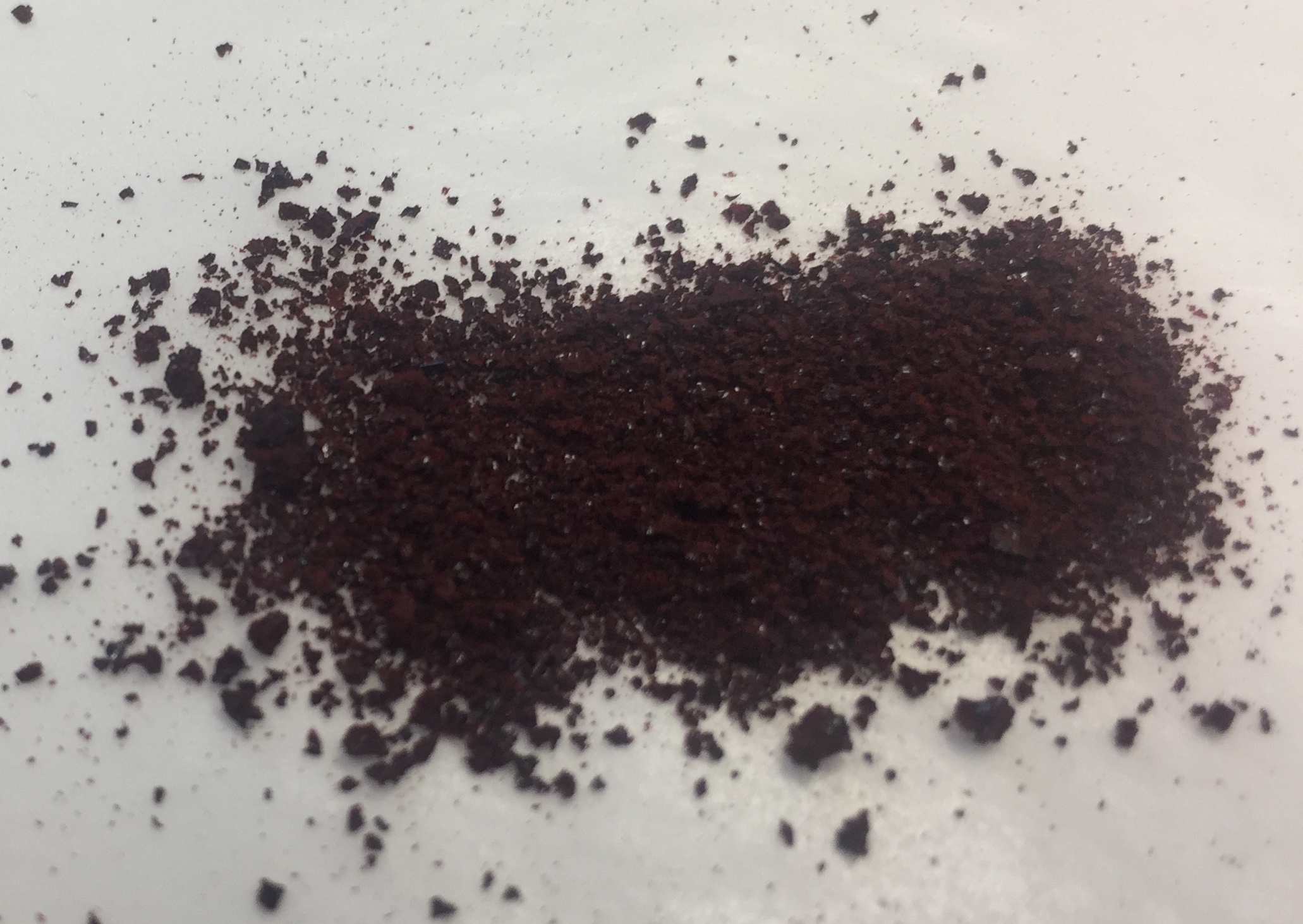
- Trihydrate

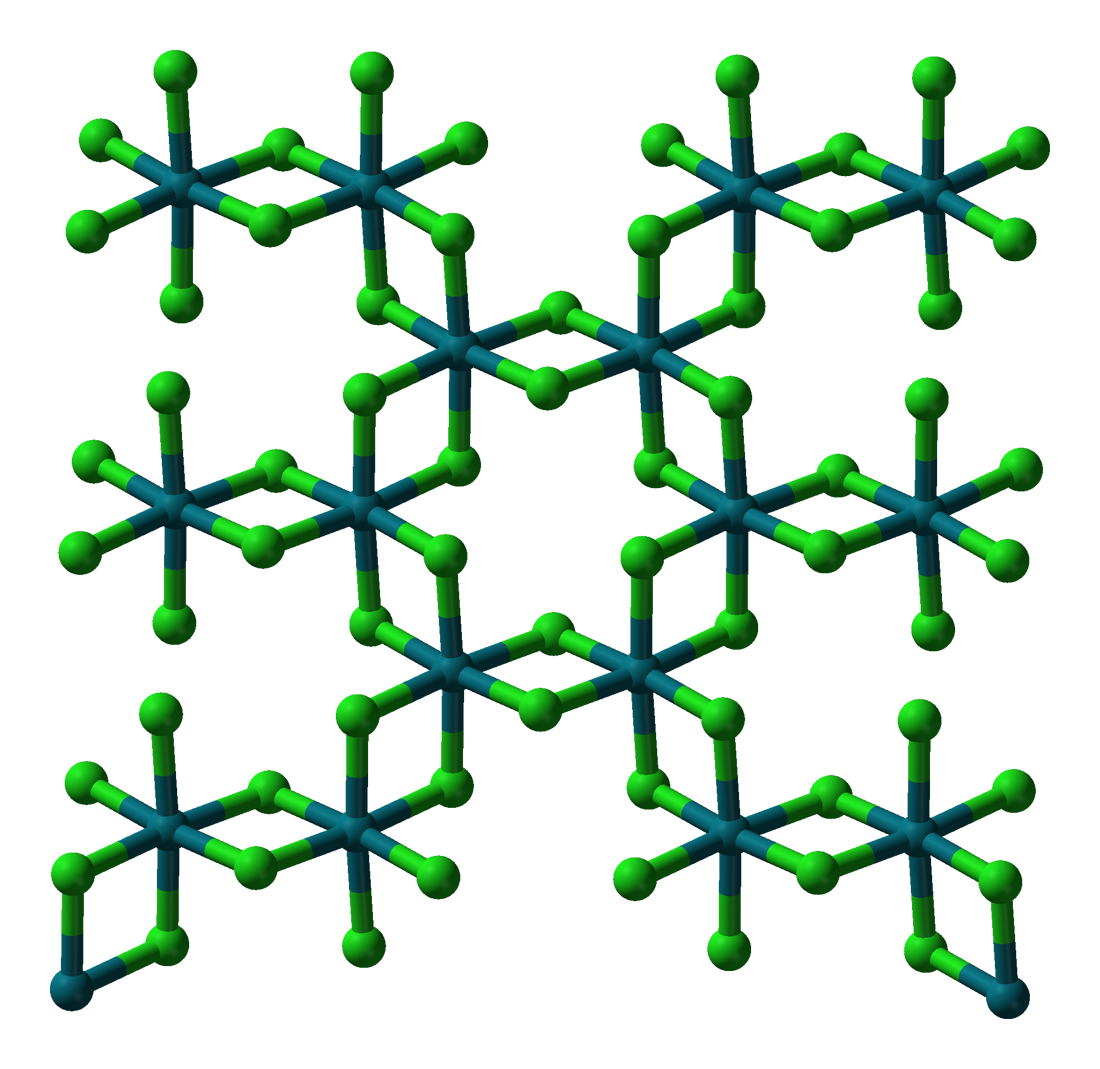
- Rhodium(III) chloride

Names
- Other names Rhodium trichloride

Identifiers
CAS Number	10049-07-7; 13569-65-8 (trihydrate)
3D model (JSmol)	Interactive image
ChemSpider	8096382
ECHA InfoCard	100.030.138
EC Number	233-165-4
PubChem CID	24872
RTECS number	VI9290000
UNII	Q4D88MX3Z8
CompTox Dashboard (EPA)	DTXSID5044497
- InChI: InChI=1S/3ClH.Rh/h3*1H;/q;;;+3/p-3 Key: SONJTKJMTWTJCT-UHFFFAOYSA-K; InChI=1S/3ClH.Rh/h3*1H;/q;;;+3/p-3; Key: SONJTKJMTWTJCT-UHFFFAOYSA-K
- SMILES: [Rh+3].[Cl-].[Cl-].[Cl-]

Properties
Chemical formula	RhCl_{3}
Molar mass	209.26 g/mol
Appearance	anhydrous: red-brown solid; trihydrate: dark red
Density	5.38 g/cm^{3}
Melting point	anhydrous: 450 °C (842 °F; 723 K); trihydrate: decomposes above 100 °C (212 °F; 373 K)
Solubility in water	anhydrous: insoluble; trihydrate: very soluble
Solubility	anhydrous: insoluble in acids, soluble in hydroxide and cyanide solutions, also soluble in aqua regia; trihydrate: very soluble in alcohols
Magnetic susceptibility (χ)	−7.5·10^{−6} cm^{3}/mol

Structure
Crystal structure	Monoclinic, mS16
Space group	C12/m1, No. 12
Lattice constant	a = 5.95 Å, b = 10.3 Å, c = 6.03 Å α = 90°, β = 109.2°, γ = 90°
Lattice volume (V)	348.993 Å^{3}
Formula units (Z)	4
Coordination geometry	octahedral

Thermochemistry
Std enthalpy of formation (Δ_{f}H^{⦵}_{298})	−234 kJ/mol

Hazards
- GHS labelling
Pictograms	(GHS05: Corrosive) (GHS07: Exclamation mark) (GHS08: Health hazard) (GHS09: Environmental hazard)
Signal word	Danger
Hazard statements	H290, H302, H318, H341, H410, H413
Precautionary statements	P203, P234, P264, P264+P265, P270, P273, P280, P301+P317, P305+P354+P338, P317, P318, P330, P390, P391, P405, P501
Flash point	Nonflammable
- Lethal dose or concentration (LD, LC)
LD_{50} (median dose)	>500 mg/kg (rat, oral); 1302 mg/kg (rat, oral)

Related compounds
Other anions	Rhodium(III) fluoride Rhodium(III) bromide Rhodium(III) iodide
Other cations	Cobalt(II) chloride Iridium(III) chloride
Related compounds	Ruthenium(III) chloride Palladium(II) chloride
- Except where otherwise noted, data are given for materials in their standard state (at 25 °C [77 °F], 100 kPa). verify (what is ?) Infobox references

Rhodium(III) chloride refers to inorganic compounds with the formula RhCl_{3}(H_{2}O)_{n}, where n varies from 0 to 3. These are diamagnetic red-brown solids. The soluble trihydrated (n = 3) salt is the usual compound of commerce. It is widely used to prepare compounds used in homogeneous catalysis.

== Structures ==
Rhodium trichloride and its various hydrates can be considered the default halides of rhodium. By contrast, its lighter congener cobalt does not form a stable trichloride, mainly being available as cobalt(II) chloride.

Anhydrous rhodium chloride is a dense red-brown solid. According to X-ray crystallography, it crystallises in the motif seen also for YCl_{3} and AlCl_{3} (see image in upper right). The metal centres are octahedral, and the halides are doubly bridging. The octahedral molecular geometry adopted by RhCl_{3} is characteristic of most rhodium(III) complexes. The anhydrous material is insoluble in common solvents and, for that reason, of little value in the laboratory.

=== Hydrates and aqueous solutions ===
Although hydrated rhodium trichloride is widely marketed and often used, the structure of this red solid has not been elucidated crystallographically. This reddish solid (see picture in box) is often described as RhCl_{3}(H_{2}O)_{3}, but this composition has not been confirmed crystallographically.

Aqueous solutions of "rhodium trichloride hydrate" have been characterized by ^{103}Rh NMR spectroscopy. Several species are detected, the proportions of which change with time and depend on the concentration of chloride. The relative distribution of these species determines the colour of the solutions, which can range from yellow (the hexaaquo ion) to "raspberry-red". Some of these species are the aquo complexes [Rh(H_{2}O)_{6}]^{3+}, [RhCl(H_{2}O)_{5}]^{2+}, cis- and trans-[RhCl_{2}(H_{2}O)_{4}]^{+}, and two isomers of [RhCl_{3}(H_{2}O)_{3}]. These species have been separated by ion exchange chromatography and individually characterized by UV-vis spectroscopy.

== Preparation ==
RhCl_{3}(H_{2}O)_{3} is produced from salts such as Na_{3}RhCl_{6}, the latter being obtained in the purification of rhodium from the other platinum group metals such as platinum and iridium. The trisodium salt is converted to H_{3}RhCl_{6} by ion exchange chromatography. Recrystallization of this acidic salt from water affords the hydrated trichloride, sometimes called "soluble rhodium trichloride." Anhydrous RhCl_{3} is prepared by reaction of chlorine with rhodium sponge metal at 200–300 °C. Above 800 °C, the anhydrous chloride reverts to Rh metal and chlorine.

== Coordination complexes ==
Despite the complexity of its solutions, hydrated rhodium trichloride is the precursor to a wide variety of complexes prepared in high yields.These complexes generally arise by substitution reactions, whereby of water and chloride are replaced by more basic ligands as described in the sections below. These reactions are facilitated by the fact that hydrated rhodium trichloride is soluble in a range of polar organic solvents.

=== Oxygen and nitrogen-based ligands ===
Evidence for the affinity of rhodium chlorides for oxygen-based ligands is provided by the chloro-aquo complexes discussed above. Rhodium trichloride reacts with acetylacetone to give rhodium acetylacetonate.

Aqueous solutions of rhodium trichloride react with ammonia to give the salt pentamminerhodium chloride, [RhCl(NH_{3})_{5}]Cl_{2}. As for other metal-ammine complexes, the term "ammine" refers to ammonia bound to a metal ion as a ligand. Zinc reduction of this cation followed by the addition of sulfate gives the colourless hydride complex [HRh(NH_{3})_{5}]SO_{4}. Some rhodium ammine chlorides are used in the purification of rhodium from its ores.

Upon boiling in a mixture of ethanol and pyridine (py), hydrated rhodium trichloride converts to trans-[RhCl_{2}(py)_{4})]Cl. In the absence of a reductant, the reaction affords fac-[RhCl_{3}(py)_{3}], analogous to the thioether derivatives. Oxidation of aqueous ethanolic solution of pyridine and RhCl_{3}(H_{2}O)_{3} by air affords a blue paramagnetic oxygen-bridged compound, [Cl(py)_{4}Rh-O_{2}-Rh(py)_{4}Cl]^{5+}.

=== Thioethers and tertiary phosphines ===
Rhodium(III) also forms a range of complexes with soft Lewis bases, such as thioethers, phosphines, and arsines. Such ligands form Rh(III) complexes, but unlike the "hard" N- and O-based ligands, these complexes often can be reduced to Rh(I) derivatives. The reactions are facilitated by the solubility of rhodium trichloride in alcohols, which also dissolve the organic ligands. Thus, ethanolic solutions of hydrated rhodium trichloride react with diethyl sulfide:

"RhCl_{3}(H_{2}O)_{3}" + 3 S(C_{2}H_{5})_{2} → RhCl_{3}(S(C_{2}H_{5})_{2})_{3} + 3H_{2}O

This complex has been used as source of anhydrous rhodium trichloride that is soluble in lipophilic solvents. Both fac and mer stereoisomers of such complexes have been isolated.

Reaction of RhCl_{3}(H_{2}O)_{3} under mild conditions with tertiary phosphines affords adducts akin to the aforementioned thioether complexes. When these reactions are conducted in boiling ethanol solution, reduction occurs, leading to rhodium(I) derivatives. A famous derivative is [RhCl(PPh_{3})_{3}] known as Wilkinson's catalyst. Either the ethanol solvent or the phosphine serves as reductant:

"RhCl_{3}(H_{2}O)_{3}" + 3 P(C_{6}H_{5})_{3} + CH_{3}CH_{2}OH → RhCl(P(C_{6}H_{5})_{3})_{3} + 3 H_{2}O + 2 HCl + CH_{3}CHO
"RhCl_{3}(H_{2}O)_{3}" + 4 P(C_{6}H_{5})_{3} → RhCl(P(C_{6}H_{5})_{3})_{3} + 2 H_{2}O + 2 HCl + OP(C_{6}H_{5})_{3}

=== Alkenes and carbon monoxide ===
Unlike most other air-stable metal salts, hydrated rhodium trichloride reacts under mild conditions (near room temperature, one atmosphere) with carbon monoxide and many olefins. This behavior opens the doors to extensive inventory of organorhodium compounds. Most of these substrates cause reduction of rhodium(III) to rhodium(I). The resulting Rh(I) complexes engage the carbon-based ligands by pi-backbonding.

Reaction of hydrated rhodium trichloride with olefins affords compounds of the type Rh_{2}Cl_{2}(alkene)_{4}. Specifically, ethylene gives chlorobis(ethylene)rhodium dimer ([(C_{2}H_{4})_{2}Rh(μ−Cl)]_{2}). With 1,5-cyclooctadiene, cyclooctadiene rhodium chloride dimer ([(C_{8}H_{12})_{2}Rh(μ−Cl)]_{2}) is produced.

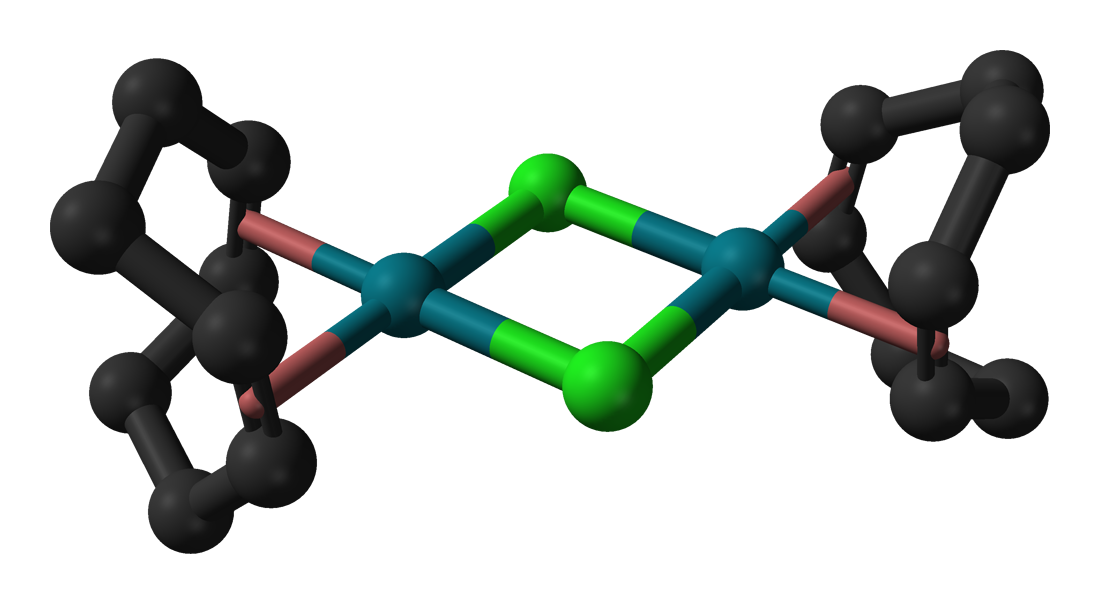
Structure of the cyclooctadiene rhodium chloride dimer.

When hydrated rhodium trichloride is treated with cyclopentadienes, organometallic half sandwich compounds can be produced. For example, treating hydrated rhodium trichloride with pentamethylcyclopentadiene in hot methanol leads to the precipitation of solid pentamethylcyclopentadienyl rhodium dichloride dimer:

2 C_{5}(CH_{3})_{5}H + 2 "RhCl_{_{3}}(H_{_{2}}O)_{_{3}}" → [(C_{5}(CH_{3})_{5})RhCl_{2}]_{2} + 2 HCl + 6 H_{2}O

A solution of hydrated rhodium trichloride in methanol reacts with carbon monoxide to produce H[RhCl_{2}(CO)_{2}], which contains the dicarbonyldichloridorhodate(I) anion. Further carbonylation in the presence of sodium citrate as a reductant leads to tetrarhodium dodecacarbonyl, Rh_{4}(CO)_{12}, a rhodium(0) cluster compound. Solid RhCl_{3}(H_{2}O)_{3} reacts with flowing CO gives the volatile compound [(CO)_{2}Rh(μ-Cl)]_{2}.

Numerous Rh-CO-phosphine complexes have been prepared in the course of extensive investigations on hydroformylation catalysis. RhCl(PPh_{3})_{3} reacts with CO to give trans-RhCl(CO)(PPh_{3})_{2}, stoichiometrically analogous to but less nucleophilic than Vaska's complex. trans-RhCl(CO)(PPh_{3})_{2} reacts with a mixture of NaBH_{4} and PPh_{3} to give HRh(CO)(PPh_{3})_{3}, a highly active catalyst for the hydroformylation of alkenes.

== Catalysis ==
Beginning especially in the 1960s, RhCl_{3}(H_{2}O)_{3} was demonstrated to be catalytically active for a variety of reactions involving CO, H_{2}, and alkenes. These compounds are fundamental petrochemical feedstocks, so their manipulation can be consequential. For example, RhCl_{3}(H_{2}O)_{3} was shown to dimerise ethylene to a mixture of cis and trans 2-butene:

2 CH_{2}=CH_{2} → CH_{3}−CH_{2}−CH=CH_{2}

Ethylene dimerization was shown to involve catalysis by the aforementioned ethylene complexes. This and many related discoveries nurtured the then young field of homogeneous catalysis, wherein the catalysts are dissolved in the medium with the substrate. Previous to this era, most metal catalysts were "heterogeneous", i.e. the catalysts were solids and the substrates were either liquid or gases.

Another advance in homogeneous catalysis was the finding that PPh_{3}-derived complexes were active catalytically as well as soluble in organic solvents, The best known such catalyst being Wilkinson's catalyst that catalyzes the hydrogenation and isomerization of alkenes.

The hydroformylation of alkenes is catalyzed by the related RhH(CO)(PPh_{3})_{3}. Catalysis by rhodium is so efficient that it has significantly displaced the previous technology based on less expensive cobalt catalysts.
