= Ruthenium(III) bromide =

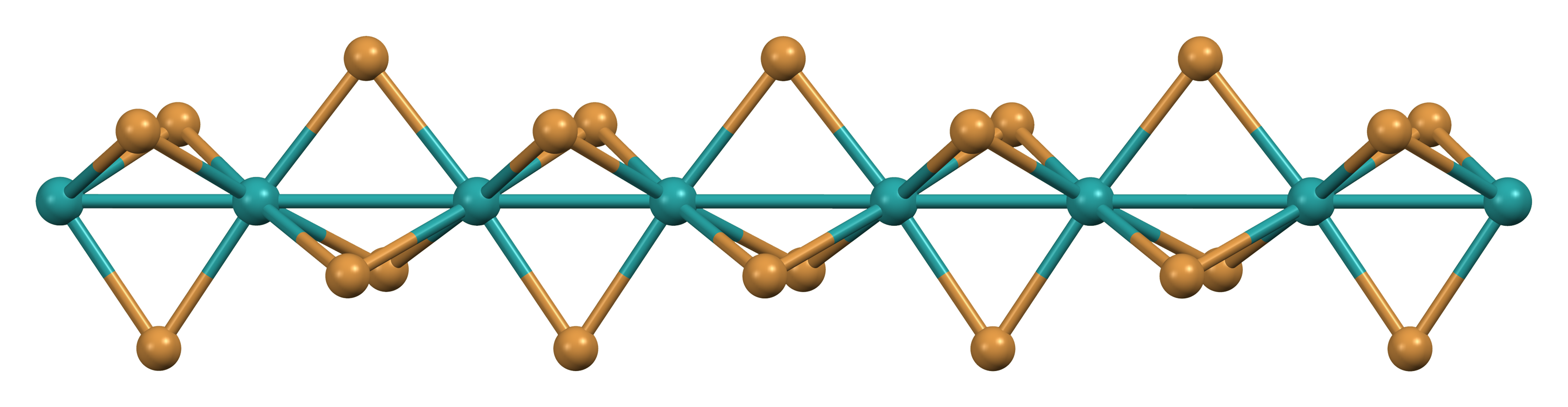

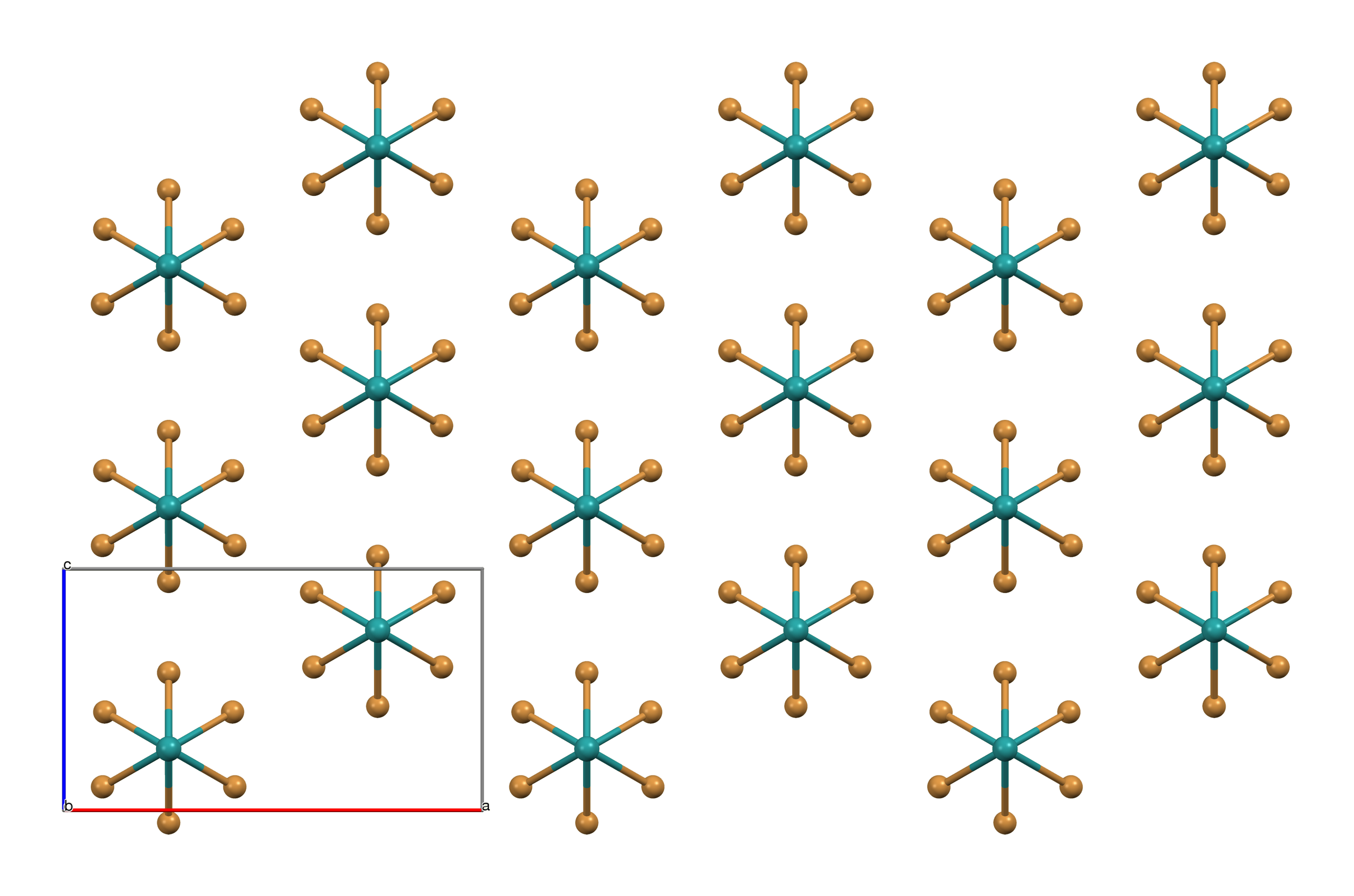

Identifiers
CAS Number	14014-88-1
3D model (JSmol)	Interactive image; Interactive image
ChemSpider	75924
ECHA InfoCard	100.034.377
EC Number	237-829-4
PubChem CID	176290
UNII	VJ7MYGN19I
CompTox Dashboard (EPA)	DTXSID40930716
- InChI: InChI=1S/3BrH.Ru/h3*1H;/q;;;+3/p-3 Key: WYRXRHOISWEUST-UHFFFAOYSA-K
- SMILES: Br[Ru](Br)Br; [Br-].[Br-].[Br-].[Ru+3]

Properties
Chemical formula	RuBr_{3}
Molar mass	340.782 g/mol

Structure
Crystal structure	orthorhombic
Space group	Pmmn, No. 59
Coordination geometry	octahedral

Hazards
- GHS labelling
Pictograms	(GHS05: Corrosive)
Signal word	Danger
Hazard statements	H314
Precautionary statements	P260, P264, P280, P301+P330+P331, P303+P361+P353, P304+P340, P305+P351+P338, P310, P321, P363, P405, P501

Related compounds
Other anions	Ruthenium(III) chloride
Other cations	Rhodium(III) bromide Iron(III) bromide Molybdenum(III) bromide
- Except where otherwise noted, data are given for materials in their standard state (at 25 °C [77 °F], 100 kPa). Infobox references

Ruthenium(III) bromide is a chemical compound of ruthenium and bromine with the formula RuBr_{3}. It is a dark brown solid that decomposes above 400 °C.

== Structure ==
The crystal structures of ruthenium(III) bromide contain parallel (RuBr_{3})_{∞} columns. The compound undergoes a phase transition around 384 K (111 °C) from an ordered orthorhombic structure in space group Pnmm with alternating long and short Ru-Ru distances to a disordered hexagonal TiI_{3}-like structure in space group P6_{3}/mcm with (on average) equal Ru-Ru distances. In the disordered polymorph, the Ru-Ru distances are not believed to actually be equal but appear so due to a random distribution of two distinct column conformations. Both polymorphs consist of hexagonally close-packed bromide ions.

== Preparation ==
Ruthenium(III) bromide can be prepared by the reaction of ruthenium metal with bromine at high temperature and pressure (720 K and 20 bar):

2 Ru + 3 Br_{2} → 2 RuBr_{3}
