= Rhodium(III) bromide =

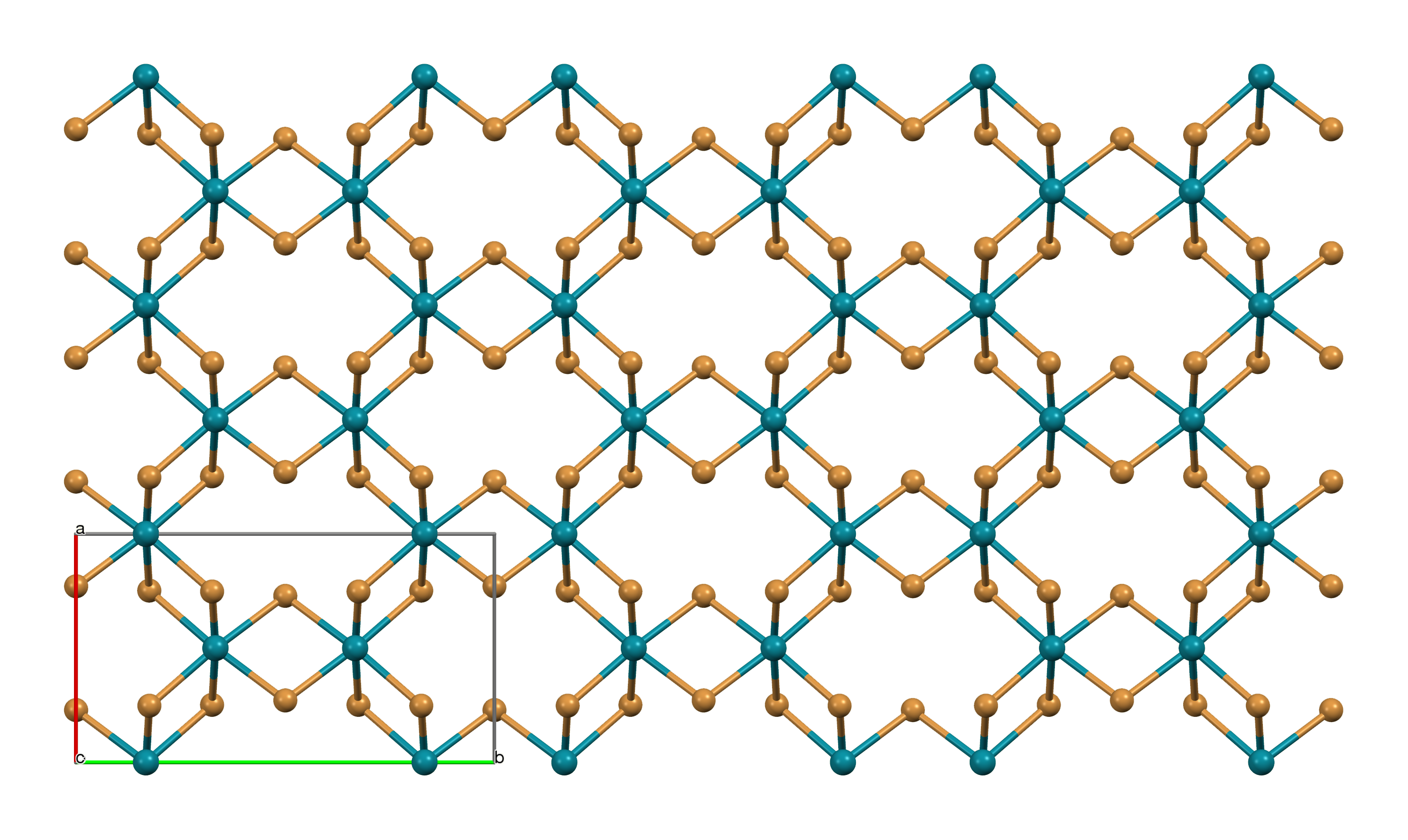

Names
- Other names Rhodium tribromide

Identifiers
CAS Number	15608-29-4
3D model (JSmol)	Interactive image
ChemSpider	76689
ECHA InfoCard	100.036.064
EC Number	239-687-9
PubChem CID	85020
CompTox Dashboard (EPA)	DTXSID40935367
- InChI: InChI=1S/3BrH.Rh/h3*1H;/q;;;+3/p-3 Key: MMRXYMKDBFSWJR-UHFFFAOYSA-K
- SMILES: [Br-].[Br-].[Br-].[Rh+3]

Properties
Chemical formula	RhBr_{3}
Molar mass	342 g/mol
Appearance	red-brown solid
Solubility in water	soluble
Solubility	soluble in methanol, ethanol

Related compounds
Other anions	Rhodium(III) fluoride; Rhodium(III) chloride; Rhodium(III) iodide
- Except where otherwise noted, data are given for materials in their standard state (at 25 °C [77 °F], 100 kPa). Infobox references

Rhodium(III) bromide refers to inorganic compounds of the formula RhBr_{3}(H_{2}O)_{n} where n = 0 or approximately three. Both forms are brown solids. The hydrate is soluble in water and lower alcohols. It is used to prepare rhodium bromide complexes. Rhodium bromides are similar to the chlorides, but have attracted little academic or commercial attention.

== Structure ==
Rhodium(III) bromide adopts the aluminium chloride crystal structure.

== Reactions ==
Rhodium(III) bromide is a starting material for the synthesis of other rhodium halides. For example, it reacts with bromine trifluoride to form rhodium(IV) fluoride and with aqueous potassium iodide to form rhodium(III) iodide. Like most other rhodium trihalides, anhydrous RhBr_{3} is insoluble in water. The dihydrate RhBr_{3}·2H_{2}O forms when rhodium metal reacts with hydrochloric acid and bromine.
