= Bis(triphenylphosphine)rhodium carbonyl chloride =

Names
- Other names Bis(triphenylphosphine)rhodium(I) carbonyl chloride

Identifiers
CAS Number	13938-94-8; trans: 15318-33-9; cis: 16353-77-8
3D model (JSmol)	Interactive image
EC Number	237-712-8
PubChem CID	11319966
UNII	trans: 100LRS254G; cis: 84NQM9263V
- InChI: InChI=1S/2C18H15P.CO.ClH.Rh/c2*1-4-10-16(11-5-1)19(17-12-6-2-7-13-17)18-14-8-3-9-15-18;1-2;;/h2*1-15H;;1H;/p-1 Key: RMJBMLFXJWHQJH-UHFFFAOYSA-M
- SMILES: [C-]#[O+].C1=CC=C(C=C1)P(C2=CC=CC=C2)C3=CC=CC=C3.C1=CC=C(C=C1)P(C2=CC=CC=C2)C3=CC=CC=C3.[Cl-].[Rh]

Properties
Chemical formula	RhCl(CO)[P(C_{6}H_{5})_{3}]_{2}
Molar mass	690.94
Appearance	yellow solid

Hazards
- GHS labelling
Pictograms	(GHS07: Exclamation mark)
Signal word	Warning
Hazard statements	H302, H312, H315, H319, H332
Precautionary statements	P261, P264, P270, P271, P273, P280, P301+P312, P302+P352, P304+P312, P304+P340, P305+P351+P338, P312, P321, P322, P330, P332+P313, P337+P313, P362, P363, P403+P233, P405, P501
- Except where otherwise noted, data are given for materials in their standard state (at 25 °C [77 °F], 100 kPa). Infobox references

Bis(triphenylphosphine)rhodium carbonyl chloride is the organorhodium complex with the formula [RhCl(CO)(PPh_{3})_{2}]. This complex of rhodium(I) is a bright yellow, air-stable solid. It is the Rh analogue of Vaska's complex, the corresponding iridium complex. With regards to its structure, the complex is square planar with mutually trans triphenylphosphine (PPh_{3}) ligands. The complex is a versatile homogeneous catalyst.

== Synthesis and reactions ==
Bis(triphenylphosphine)rhodium carbonyl chloride was originally prepared by treating Rh_{2}Cl_{2}(CO)_{4} with triphenylphosphine. However, it is typically produced by the carbonylation of Wilkinson's catalyst:

RhCl[P(C_{6}H_{5})_{3}]_{3} + CO → RhCl(CO)[P(C_{6}H_{5})_{3}]_{2} + P(C_{6}H_{5})_{3}

In homogeneous catalysis, this conversion is typically an undesirable side-reaction since [RhCl(CO)(PPh_{3})_{2}] is a poor hydrogenation catalyst.

Bis(triphenylphosphine)rhodium carbonyl chloride is the precursor to tris(triphenylphosphine)rhodium carbonyl hydride, an important catalyst for hydroformylation.

RhCl(CO)[P(C_{6}H_{5})_{3}]_{2} + NaBH_{4} + P(C_{6}H_{5})_{3} → RhH(CO)[P(C_{6}H_{5})_{3}]_{3} + NaCl + BH_{3}
