= Dichlorotetrakis(pyridine)rhodium(III) chloride =

Identifiers
CAS Number	14077-30-6
3D model (JSmol)	Interactive image
ChemSpider	140437
EC Number	237-929-8
PubChem CID	159721
- InChI: InChI=1S/4C5H5N.3ClH.Rh/c4*1-2-4-6-5-3-1;;;;/h4*1-5H;3*1H;/q;;;;;;;+3/p-3 Key: SIIBZAPGWNBRSK-UHFFFAOYSA-K
- SMILES: C1=CC=NC=C1.C1=CC=NC=C1.C1=CC=NC=C1.C1=CC=NC=C1.[Cl-].[Cl-].[Cl-].[Rh+3]

Properties
Chemical formula	C_{20}H_{20}Cl_{3}N_{4}Rh
Molar mass	525.66 g·mol^{−1}
Appearance	yellow solid

Hazards
- GHS labelling
Pictograms	(GHS07: Exclamation mark)
Signal word	Warning
Hazard statements	H315, H319, H335
Precautionary statements	P261, P264, P271, P280, P302+P352, P304+P340, P305+P351+P338, P312, P321, P332+P313, P337+P313, P362, P403+P233, P405, P501
- Except where otherwise noted, data are given for materials in their standard state (at 25 °C [77 °F], 100 kPa). Infobox references

Dichlorotetrakis(pyridine)rhodium(III) chloride is the chloride salt of the coordination complex with the formula [RhCl_{2}(pyridine)_{4}]^{+}. Various hydrates are known, but all are yellow solids. The tetrahydrate initially crystallizes from water. The tetrahydrate converts to the monohydrate upon vacuum drying at 100 °C.

The hydrates of [RhCl_{2}(pyridine)_{4}]Cl are prepared by heating rhodium trichloride with an excess of pyridine in the presence of a catalytic amount of a reductant.

== Related complexes ==
The molecular complex RhCl_{3}(pyridine)_{3} is an intermediate in the synthesis of [RhCl_{2}(pyridine)_{4}]Cl.
