= Technetium(III) iodide =

Identifiers
CAS Number	1509903-36-9
3D model (JSmol)	Interactive image
- InChI: InChI=1S/3HI.Tc/h3*1H;/q;;;+3/p-3 Key: GRXKOOLXSFLODZ-UHFFFAOYSA-K
- SMILES: [Tc+3].[I-].[I-].[I-]

Properties
Chemical formula	TcI_{3}
Appearance	black solid
Solubility in water	insoluble
- Except where otherwise noted, data are given for materials in their standard state (at 25 °C [77 °F], 100 kPa). Infobox references

Technetium(III) iodide is an inorganic compound with the chemical formula TcI_{3}. It is the first iodide of technetium discovered and was first reported in 2013. Theoretical studies have shown that a single layer of TcI_{3} is ferromagnetic.

It can be obtained by the reaction of Tc_{2}(CH_{3}COO)_{4}Cl_{2} and hydrogen iodide at 150 °C, or by the reaction of technetium and iodine at 300~400 °C. It decomposes in a vacuum at 450 °C to produce the metal technetium.
