= Rhodium(IV) fluoride =

Names
- Other names Rhodium tetrafluoride

Identifiers
| CAS Number | 60617-65-4 |
| 3D model (JSmol) | Interactive image |
| PubChem CID | 15806680 |
| CompTox Dashboard (EPA) | DTXSID401336826 |
- InChI: InChI=1S/4FH.Rh/h4*1H;/q;;;;+4/p-4 Key: NEZZNADHMSRTOQ-UHFFFAOYSA-J
- SMILES: F[Rh](F)(F)F

Properties
| Chemical formula | RhF_{4} |
| Appearance | purple-red solid |

Related compounds
| Other anions | rhodium dioxide |
| Related compounds | rhodium(III) fluoride rhodium(V) fluoride rhodium(VI) fluoride |
- Except where otherwise noted, data are given for materials in their standard state (at 25 °C [77 °F], 100 kPa). Infobox references

Rhodium(IV) fluoride is a chemical compound of rhodium and fluorine. It is formed when rhodium(III) bromide reacts with bromine trifluoride. Iridium(IV) fluoride, palladium(IV) fluoride and platinum(IV) fluoride have the same crystal structure.
