= Iron(II) bromide =

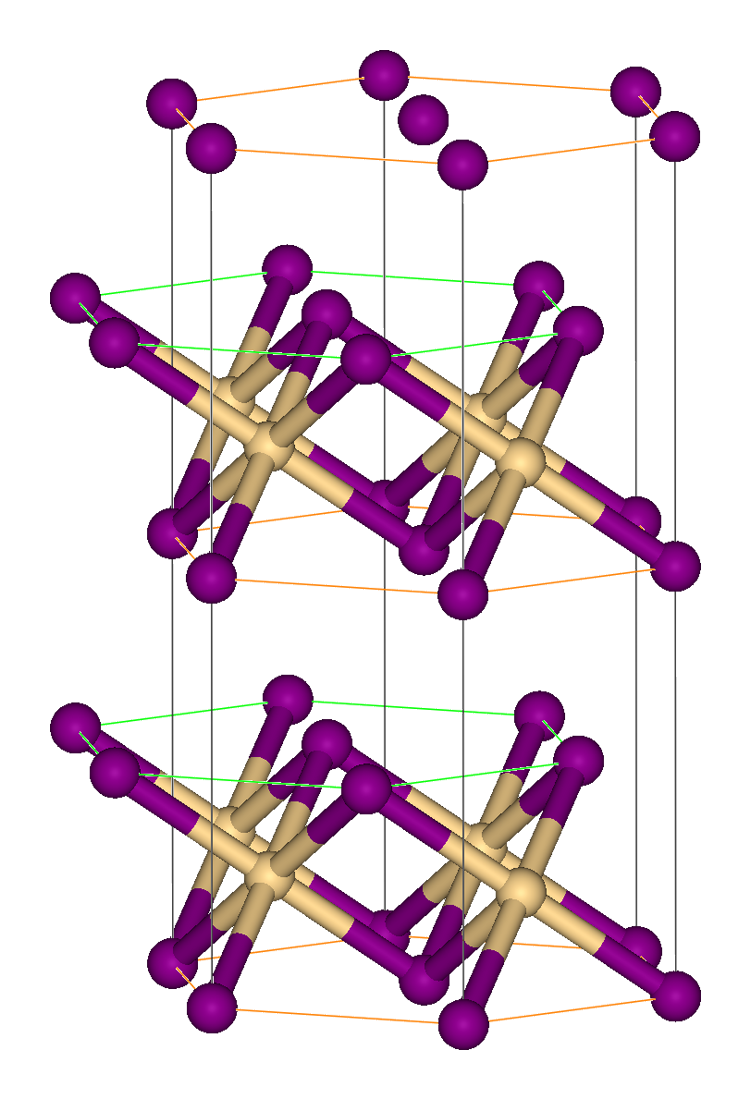

Names
- IUPAC name Iron(II) bromide
- Other names Ferrous bromide

Identifiers
CAS Number	20049-61-0 tetrahydrate; 7789-46-0 anhydrous
3D model (JSmol)	anhydrous: Interactive image; tetrahydrate: Interactive image
ChemSpider	74218
ECHA InfoCard	100.029.244
PubChem CID	425646
UNII	EA3X054RBZ
CompTox Dashboard (EPA)	DTXSID201014482 DTXSID80976870, DTXSID201014482
- InChI: InChI=1S/2BrH.Fe/h2*1H;/q;;+2/p-2 Key: GYCHYNMREWYSKH-UHFFFAOYSA-L; InChI=1/2BrH.Fe/h2*1H;/q;;+2/p-2 Key: GYCHYNMREWYSKH-NUQVWONBAN
- SMILES: anhydrous: Br[Fe]Br; tetrahydrate: Br[Fe-4](Br)([OH2+])([OH2+])([OH2+])[OH2+]

Properties
Chemical formula	FeBr_{2}
Molar mass	215.65 g mol^{−1}
Appearance	yellow-brown solid
Density	4.63 g cm^{−3}, solid
Melting point	684 °C (1,263 °F; 957 K) (anhydrous); 27 °C (Hexahydrate)
Boiling point	934 °C (1,713 °F; 1,207 K)
Solubility in water	117 g / 100 ml
Solubility in other solvents	THF, methanol, ethanol
Magnetic susceptibility (χ)	+13,600·10^{−6} cm^{3}/mol

Structure
Crystal structure	Rhombohedral, hP3, SpaceGroup = P-3m1, No. 164
Coordination geometry	octahedral

Hazards
- Occupational safety and health (OHS/OSH)
Main hazards	none

Related compounds
Other anions	Iron(II) fluoride Iron(II) chloride Iron(II) iodide
Other cations	Manganese(II) bromide Cobalt(II) bromide
Related compounds	Vanadium(II) bromide Iron(III) bromide
- Except where otherwise noted, data are given for materials in their standard state (at 25 °C [77 °F], 100 kPa). verify (what is ?) Infobox references

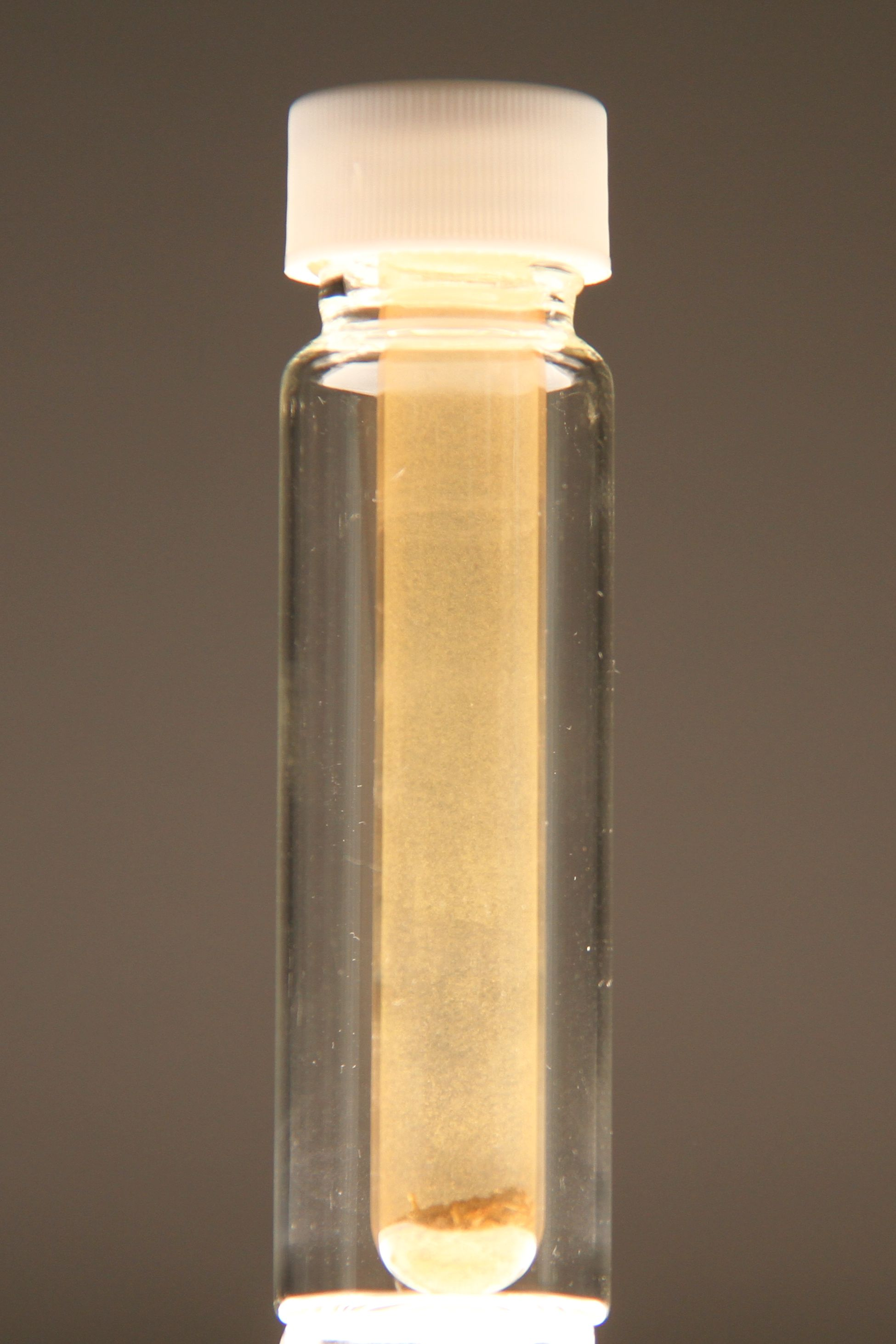
Iron(II) bromide anhydrous

Iron(II) bromide refers to inorganic compounds with the chemical formula FeBr_{2}(H_{2}O)_{x}. The anhydrous compound (x = 0) is a yellow or brownish-colored paramagnetic solid. The tetrahydrate is also known, all being pale colored solids. They are common precursor to other iron compounds.

== Structure ==
Like most metal halides, FeBr_{2} adopts a polymeric structure consisting of isolated metal centers cross-linked with halides. It crystallizes with the CdI_{2} structure, featuring close-packed layers of bromide ions, between which are located Fe(II) ions in octahedral holes. The packing of the halides is slightly different from that for FeCl_{2}, which adopts the CdCl_{2} motif. The tetrahydrates FeX_{2}(H_{2}O)_{4} (X = Cl, Br) have similar structures, with octahedral metal centers and mutually trans halides.

== Synthesis and reactions ==
FeBr_{2} is synthesized using a methanol solution of concentrated hydrobromic acid and iron powder. It adds the methanol solvate [Fe(MeOH)_{6}]Br_{2} together with hydrogen gas. Heating the methanol complex in a vacuum gives pure FeBr_{2}.

FeBr_{2} reacts with two equivalents of tetraethylammonium bromide to give [(C_{2}H_{5})_{4}N]_{2}FeBr_{4}. FeBr_{2} reacts with bromide and bromine to form the intensely colored, mixed-valence species [FeBr_{3}Br_{9}]^{−}.

== Magnetism ==
FeBr_{2} possesses a strong metamagnetism at 4.2 K and has long been studied as a prototypical metamagnetic compound.
