= Rhodium(III) iodide =

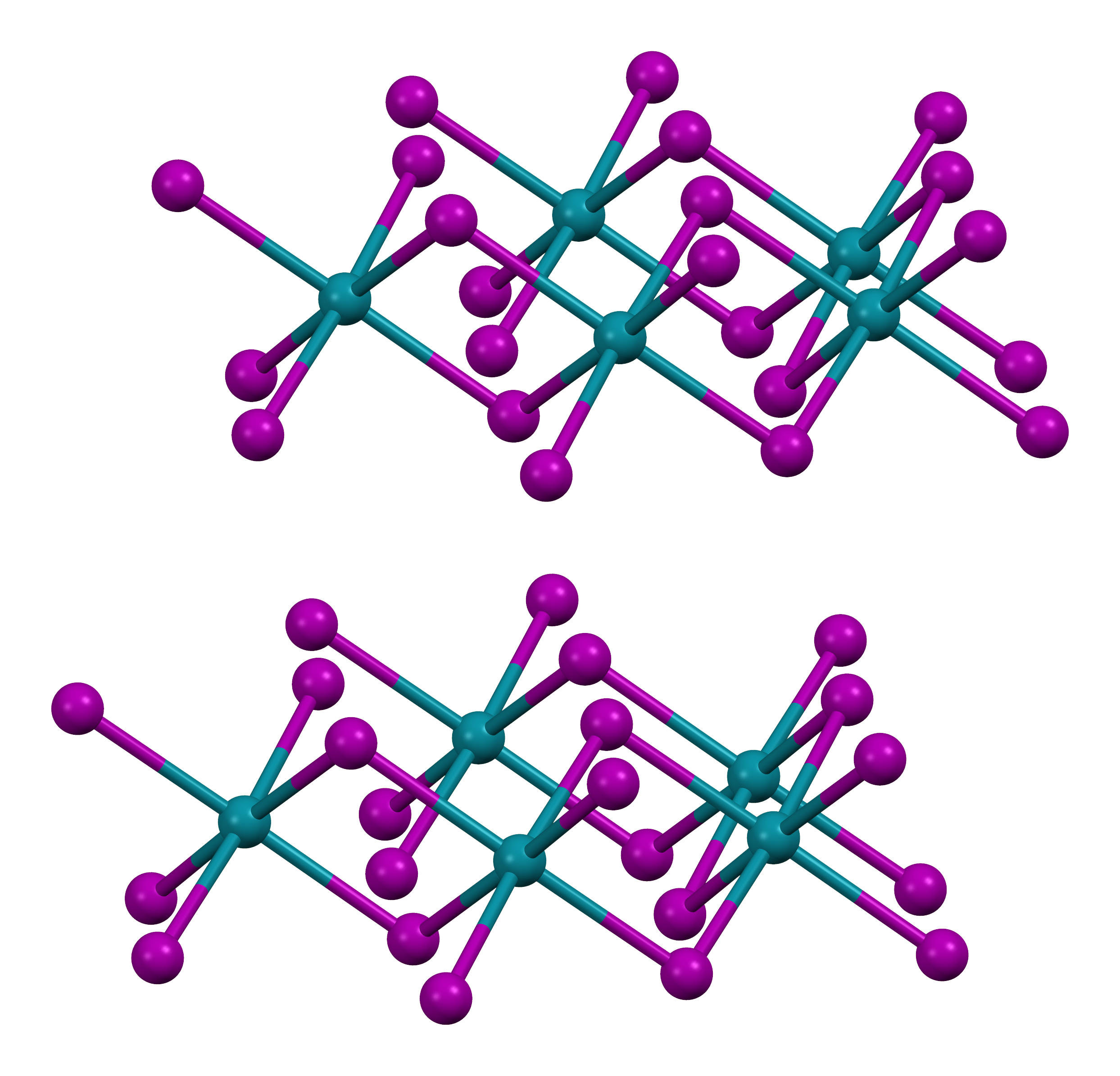

Identifiers
CAS Number	15492-38-3
3D model (JSmol)	Interactive image
ChemSpider	76627
ECHA InfoCard	100.035.913
EC Number	239-521-5
PubChem CID	4428348
CompTox Dashboard (EPA)	DTXSID00329389 DTXSID40403197, DTXSID00329389
- InChI: InChI=1S/3HI.Rh/h3*1H;/q;;;+3/p-3 Key: KXAHUXSHRWNTOD-UHFFFAOYSA-K
- SMILES: [Rh](I)(I)I

Properties
Chemical formula	I_{3}Rh
Molar mass	483.61890 g·mol^{−1}

Hazards
- GHS labelling
Pictograms	(GHS09: Environmental hazard)
Signal word	Warning
Hazard statements	H413
Precautionary statements	P273, P501

Related compounds
Other anions	Rhodium(III) bromide; Rhodium(III) chloride; Rhodium(III) fluoride
- Except where otherwise noted, data are given for materials in their standard state (at 25 °C [77 °F], 100 kPa). Infobox references

Rhodium(III) iodide is an inorganic compound with the formula RhI_{3}. It is a black solid. Some rhodium(III) iodides are used as commercial catalysts.

== Structure ==
RhI_{3} adopts same crystal structure motif as AlCl_{3} and YCl_{3}. The structure consists of cubic close-packed iodide ions and rhodium ions filling a third of the octahedral interstices, forming a layers.

== Preparation ==
Rhodium(III) iodide can be synthesised by the reaction of aqueous potassium iodide with rhodium(III) bromide.

RhBr_{3} + 3KI → RhI_{3} + 3KBr

== Reactivity ==
Rhodium(III) iodide is only known in the anhydrous form. Unlike the other rhodium(III) halides, it does not form hydrates. The related anion [RhI_{6}]^{3−} was previously thought not to form but has since been prepared by diffusion of RhCl_{3}·3H_{2}O through a layer of hydroiodic acid into piperazine.

Although RhI_{3} and [RhI_{6}]^{3−} remain laboratory curiosities, other rhodium(III) iodides have had a major impact technologically. They are catalysts used in the Monsanto process, which at one time was the dominant method for producing acetic acid, a commodity chemical. One intermediate in that cycle is [(CH_{3})Rh(CO)_{2}I_{3}]^{−}.
