= Rhodium carbonyl chloride =

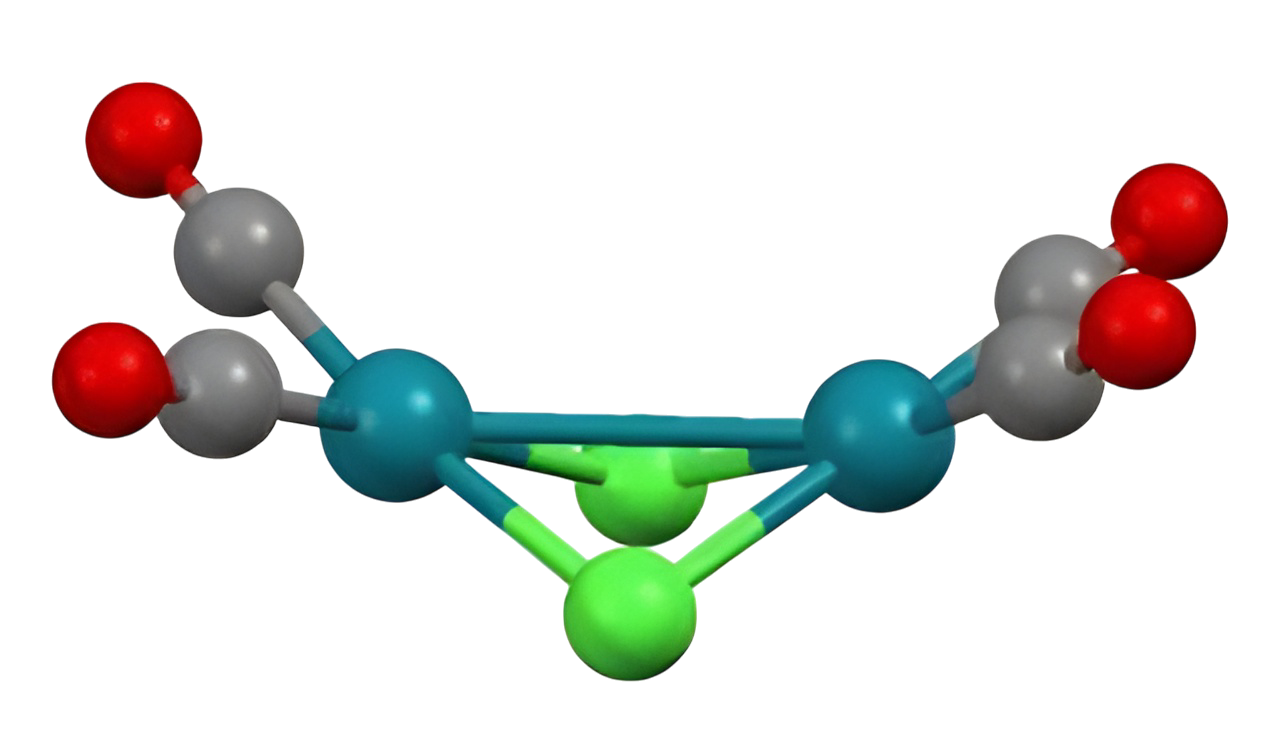

Names
- IUPAC name Di-μ-chloro-tetracarbonyldirhodium(I)
- Other names: Rhodium carbonyl chloride(I); Rhodium(I) carbonyl chloride; Rhodium(I) dicarbonyl chloride dimer; Tetracarbonyldi-μ−chlorodirhodium(I); Dirhodium tetracarbonyl dichloride

Identifiers
CAS Number	14523-22-9
3D model (JSmol)	Interactive image
ChemSpider	21241281
ECHA InfoCard	100.035.021
EC Number	238-540-6
PubChem CID	10293666 (charge error)
UNII	CRZ1K8LPMR
- InChI: InChI=1S/4CO.2ClH.2Rh/c4*1-2;;;;/h;;;;2*1H;;/q;;;;;;2*+1/p-2 Key: FGKDXBICTVUSPK-UHFFFAOYSA-L
- SMILES: [C-]#[O+].[C-]#[O+].[C-]#[O+].[C-]#[O+].[Cl-].[Cl-].[Rh+].[Rh+]

Properties
Chemical formula	C_{4}O_{4}Cl_{2}Rh_{2}
Molar mass	388.76
Appearance	red brown volatile solid
Density	2.708 g/cm^{3}
Melting point	120–125 °C (248–257 °F; 393–398 K)

Hazards
- GHS labelling
Pictograms	(GHS06: Toxic) (GHS07: Exclamation mark)
Signal word	Danger
Hazard statements	H301, H302, H330
Precautionary statements	P260, P264, P270, P271, P284, P301+P316, P301+P317, P304+P340, P316, P320, P321, P330, P403+P233, P405, P501
- Except where otherwise noted, data are given for materials in their standard state (at 25 °C [77 °F], 100 kPa). Infobox references

Rhodium carbonyl chloride is an organorhodium compound with the formula Rh_{2}Cl_{2}(CO)_{4}. It is a red-brown volatile solid that is soluble in nonpolar organic solvents. It is a precursor to other rhodium carbonyl complexes, some of which are useful in homogeneous catalysis.

== Structure ==
The molecule consists of two planar Rh(I) centers linked by two bridging chloride ligands and four CO ligands. X-ray crystallography shows that the two Rh(I) centers are square planar with the dihedral angle of 126.8° between the two RhCl_{2} planes. The metals are nonbonding.

== Synthesis and reactions ==
First prepared by Walter Hieber, it is typically prepared by treating hydrated rhodium trichloride with flowing carbon monoxide, according to this idealized redox equation:

2 RhCl_{3}(H_{2}O)_{3} + 6 CO → Rh_{2}Cl_{2}(CO)_{4} + 2 COCl_{2} + 6 H_{2}O.

The complex reacts with triphenylphosphine to give the bis(triphenylphosphine)rhodium carbonyl chloride:

Rh_{2}Cl_{2}(CO)_{4} + 4 PPh_{3} → 2 trans-RhCl(CO)(PPh_{3})_{2} + 2 CO

With chloride salts, the dichloride anion forms:

Rh_{2}Cl_{2}(CO)_{4} + 2 Cl^{−} → 2 cis-[RhCl_{2}(CO)_{2}]^{−}

With acetylacetone, rhodium carbonyl chloride reacts to give dicarbonyl(acetylacetonato)rhodium(I).

The dimer reacts with a variety of Lewis bases (:B) to form adducts RhCl(CO)_{2}:B. Its reaction with tetrahydrothiophene and the corresponding enthalpy are:

1/2 Rh_{2}Cl_{2}(CO)_{4} + :S(CH_{2})_{4} → RhCl(CO)_{2}:S(CH_{2})_{4} ΔH = -31.8 kJ mol^{−1}

This enthalpy corresponds to the enthalpy change for a reaction forming one mole of the product, RhCl(CO)_{2}:S(CH_{2})_{4}, from the acid dimer. The dissociation energy for rhodium(I) dicarbonyl chloride dimer, which is an energy contribution prior to reaction with the donor,

Rh_{2}Cl_{2}(CO)_{4} → 2 RhCl(CO)_{2}

has been determined by the ECW model to be 87.1 kJ mol^{−1}

N-heterocyclic carbene (NHC) ligands react with rhodium carbonyl chloride to give monomeric cis-[RhCl(NHC)(CO)_{2}] complexes. The IR spectra of these complexes have been used to estimate the donor strength of NHCs.
