= Iron(II) iodide =

Names
- IUPAC name Iron(II) iodide
- Other names Ferrous iodide

Identifiers
CAS Number	7783-86-0
3D model (JSmol)	Interactive image
ChemSpider	74200
ECHA InfoCard	100.029.119
EC Number	232-031-2
PubChem CID	82220
UNII	F5452U54PN
CompTox Dashboard (EPA)	DTXSID301014473 DTXSID10329658, DTXSID301014473
- InChI: InChI=1S/Fe.2HI/h;2*1H/q+2;;/p-2 Key: BQZGVMWPHXIKEQ-UHFFFAOYSA-L; InChI=1/Fe.2HI/h;2*1H/q+2;;/p-2 Key: BQZGVMWPHXIKEQ-NUQVWONBAN
- SMILES: I[Fe]I

Properties
Chemical formula	FeI_{2}
Molar mass	309.65 g/mol
Appearance	White to off-white or grey powder
Density	5.315 g/cm^{3}
Melting point	587 °C (1,089 °F; 860 K)
Boiling point	827 °C (1,521 °F; 1,100 K)
Solubility in water	soluble
Magnetic susceptibility (χ)	+13,600·10^{−6} cm^{3}/mol

Hazards
- GHS labelling
Pictograms	(GHS05: Corrosive) (GHS07: Exclamation mark) (GHS08: Health hazard)
Signal word	Danger
Hazard statements	H302, H312, H314, H315, H319, H332, H335, H360
Precautionary statements	P203, P260, P264, P264+P265, P270, P271, P280, P301+P317, P301+P330+P331, P302+P352, P302+P361+P354, P304+P340, P305+P351+P338, P305+P354+P338, P316, P317, P318, P319, P321, P330, P332+P317, P337+P317, P362+P364, P363, P403+P233, P405, P501

Related compounds
Other anions	Iron(II) fluoride Iron(II) chloride Iron(II) bromide
Other cations	Manganese(II) iodide Cobalt(II) iodide
Related Iron iodides	Iron(III) iodide
- Except where otherwise noted, data are given for materials in their standard state (at 25 °C [77 °F], 100 kPa). Infobox references

Iron(II) iodide is an inorganic compound with the chemical formula FeI_{2}. It is used as a catalyst in organic reactions.

== Properties ==
Iron(II) iodide is a hygroscopic red-violet to black solid that is soluble in water, ethanol and diethyl ether. Rapid oxidation occurs in solution and in moist air. It turns whitish when exposed to air. The solution in water is colorless.

== Structure ==
Iron(II) iodide adopts the same crystal structure as cadmium iodide (CdI_{2}). It crystallizes in the trigonal crystal system of the cadmium hydroxide type with the space group P3̅m1 (space group no. 164) and lattice constants a = 404 pm, c = 675 pm.

== Preparation ==
Iron(II) iodide can be synthesised by the reaction of iron with iodine at 500 °C:

Fe + I_{2} → FeI_{2}

This is in contrast to the other iron(II) halides, which are best prepared by reaction of heated iron with the appropriate hydrohalic acid.

Fe + 2 HX → FeX_{2} + H_{2}

Alternatively, the synthesis can be carried out by treating freshly reduced iron with concentrated hydriodic acid under a nitrogen atmosphere in methanol. The initially obtained hexamethanol solvate is then thermally decomposed to anhydrous iodide:

Fe + 2 HI + 6 MeOH → FeI_{2}·6MeOH + H_{2}
FeI_{2}·6 MeOH → FeI_{2} + 6 MeOH

Extremely finely divided iron(II) iodide is obtained by thermal decomposition of tetracarbonyldiiodidoiron(II) (Fe(CO)_{4}I_{2}).

In contrast to the ferrous fluoride, chloride and bromide, which form known hydrates, the diiodide is speculated to form a stable tetrahydrate but it has not been characterized directly.

Dissolving iron metal in hydroiodic acid is another route to aqueous solutions of iron(II) iodide. Crystalline hydrates precipitate from these solutions.

== Applications ==
Iron(II) iodide is used as an ingredient in homeopathic medicines. In the field of application it is known as Ferrum jodatum. However, the attributed effect, particularly against glandular diseases, has not been scientifically confirmed.

It is also used for the production of alkali iodides.
