= Iron(II) fluoride =

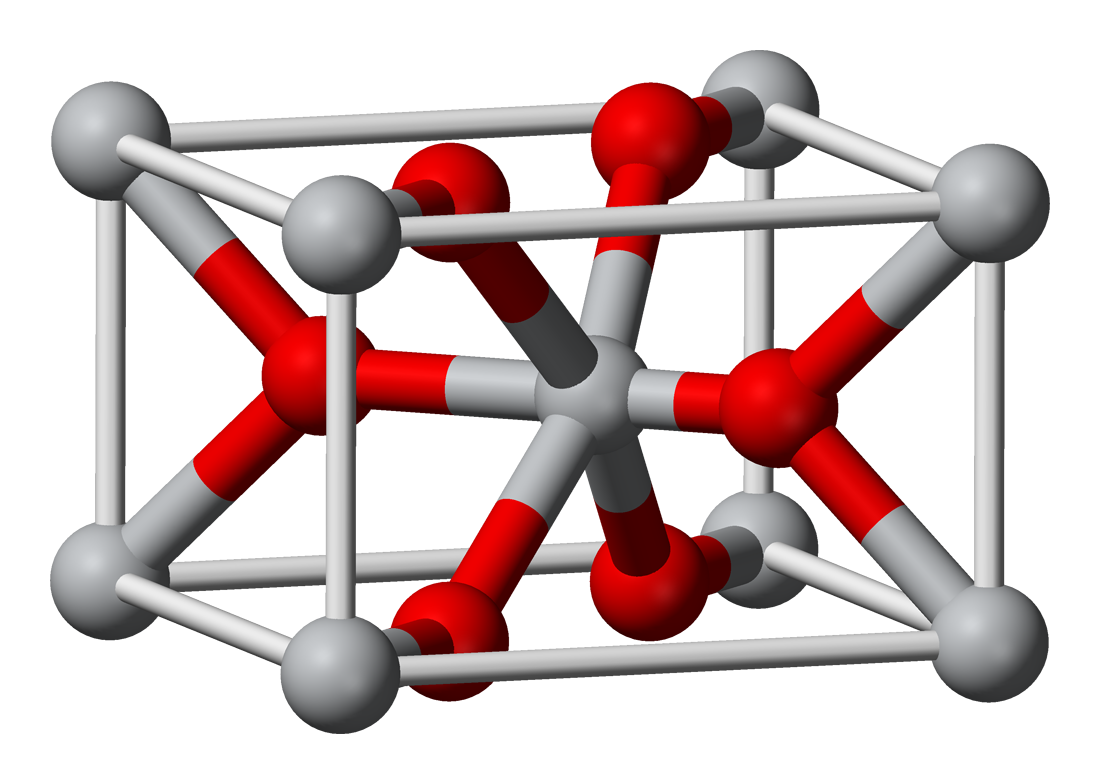

Identifiers
CAS Number	7789-28-8 anhydrous; 13940-89-1 (tetrahydrate)
3D model (JSmol)	Interactive image
ChemSpider	74215
ECHA InfoCard	100.029.232
PubChem CID	522690
UNII	NP4W87HLVO
CompTox Dashboard (EPA)	DTXSID50894779
- InChI: InChI=1S/2FH.Fe/h2*1H;/q;;+2/p-2 Key: FZGIHSNZYGFUGM-UHFFFAOYSA-L; InChI=1/2FH.Fe/h2*1H;/q;;+2/p-2 Key: FZGIHSNZYGFUGM-NUQVWONBAX
- SMILES: F[Fe]F

Properties
Chemical formula	FeF_{2}
Molar mass	93.84 g/mol (anhydrous); 165.902 g/mol (tetrahydrate)
Appearance	colorless transparent crystals
Density	4.09 g/cm^{3} (anhydrous); 2.20 g/cm^{3} (tetrahydrate)
Melting point	970 °C (1,780 °F; 1,240 K) (anhydrous); 100 °C (tetrahydrate)
Boiling point	1,100 °C (2,010 °F; 1,370 K) (anhydrous)
Solubility product (K_{sp})	2.36×10^{−6}
Solubility	insoluble in ethanol, ether; dissolves in HF
Magnetic susceptibility (χ)	+9500.0·10^{−6} cm^{3}/mol

Structure
Crystal structure	Rutile (tetragonal), tP6
Space group	P4_{2}/mnm, No. 136

Hazards
- Occupational safety and health (OHS/OSH)
Main hazards	Causes severe skin burns & eye damage; Hazardous decomposition products formed under fire conditions- Iron oxides
- GHS labelling
Pictograms	(GHS05: Corrosive) (GHS08: Health hazard) (GHS09: Environmental hazard)
NFPA 704 (fire diamond)	4 0 2 COR
Flash point	not applicable

Related compounds
Other anions	Iron(II) chloride Iron(II) bromide Iron(II) iodide Iron(II) oxide
Other cations	Manganese(II) fluoride Cobalt(II) fluoride
Related compounds	Iron(III) fluoride
- Except where otherwise noted, data are given for materials in their standard state (at 25 °C [77 °F], 100 kPa). verify (what is ?) Infobox references

Iron(II) fluoride or ferrous fluoride is an inorganic compound with the molecular formula FeF_{2}. It forms a tetrahydrate FeF_{2}·4H_{2}O that is often referred to by the same names. The anhydrous and hydrated forms are white crystalline solids.

== Structure and bonding ==
Anhydrous FeF_{2} adopts the TiO_{2} rutile structure. As such, the iron cations are octahedral and fluoride anions are trigonal planar.

The tetrahydrate can exist in two structures, or polymorphs. One form is rhombohedral and the other is hexagonal, the former having a disorder.

Like most fluoride compounds, the anhydrous and hydrated forms of iron(II) fluoride feature high spin metal center. Low temperature neutron diffraction studies show that the FeF_{2} is antiferromagnetic. Heat capacity measurements reveal an event at 78.3 K corresponding to ordering of antiferromagnetic state.

== Selected physical properties ==
FeF_{2} sublimes between 958 and 1178 K. Using Torsion and Knudsen methods, the heat of sublimation was experimentally determined and averaged to be 271 ± 2 kJ mole^{−1}.

The following reaction is proposed in order to calculate the atomization energy for Fe^{+}:

FeF_{2} + e → Fe^{+} + F_{2} (or 2F) + 2e

== Synthesis and reactions ==
The anhydrous salt can be prepared by reaction of ferrous chloride with anhydrous hydrogen fluoride. It is slightly soluble in water (with solubility product K_{sp} = 2.36×10^{−6} at 25 °C) as well as dilute hydrofluoric acid, giving a pale green solution. It is insoluble in organic solvents.

The tetrahydrate can be prepared by dissolving iron in warm hydrated hydrofluoric acid and precipitating the result by addition of ethanol. It oxidizes in moist air to give, inter alia, a hydrate of iron(III) fluoride, (FeF_{3})_{2}·9H_{2}O.

== Uses ==
FeF_{2} is used to catalyze some organic reactions.

== Battery research ==
FeF_{2} has been investigated as a cathode material for both lithium-ion and fluoride-ion batteries. Unlike conventional metal oxides, which rely on an intercalation-based lithium storage mechanism, FeF_{X} (x = 2, 3) operates via a complex conversion mechanism, resulting in higher energy density. Fluoride cathodes are stable up to 1000°C. Stability not only enhances safety and lowers the risk of thermal runaway.

FeF_{X} exhibits distinctive phase evolution, intermediate phases, and morphological transformations during lithiation and delithiation. A stable lattice of fluoride anions is maintained throughout charge and discharge cycles, consistent with high cycling reversibility.
