= Iron(III) fluoride =

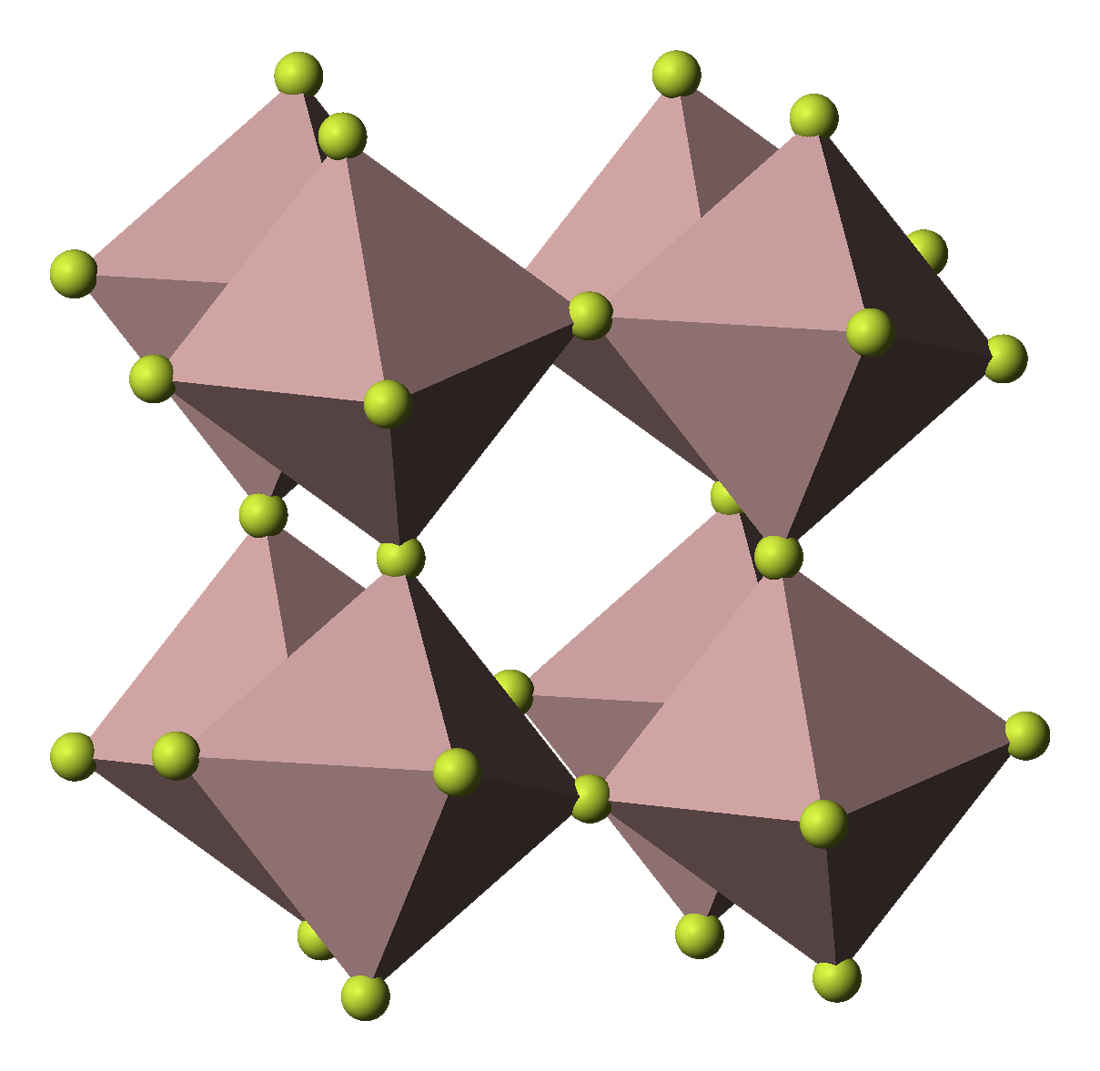

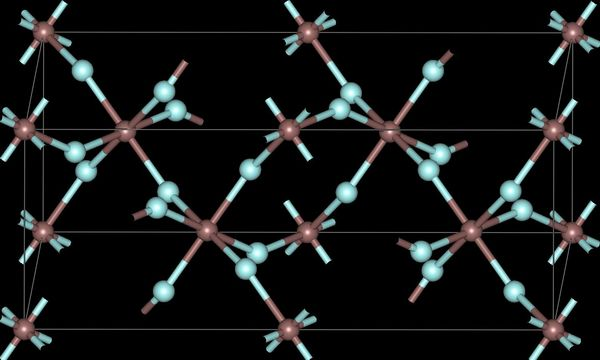

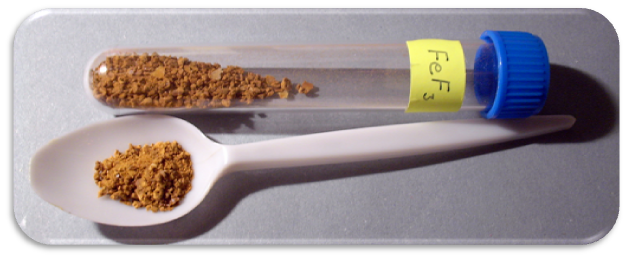

Names
- Other names: Iron trifluoride; Ferric fluoride

Identifiers
CAS Number	7783-50-8; 15469-38-2 (trihydrate)
3D model (JSmol)	Interactive image
ChemSpider	22958
ECHA InfoCard	100.029.093
PubChem CID	24552
RTECS number	NO6865000
UNII	0309P36Q66
CompTox Dashboard (EPA)	DTXSID1064823
- InChI: InChI=1S/3FH.Fe/h3*1H;/q;;;+3/p-3 Key: SHXXPRJOPFJRHA-UHFFFAOYSA-K; InChI=1/3FH.Fe/h3*1H;/q;;;+3/p-3 Key: SHXXPRJOPFJRHA-DFZHHIFOAS
- SMILES: F[Fe](F)F

Properties
Chemical formula	FeF_{3}
Molar mass	112.840 g/mol (anhydrous); 166.89 g/mol (trihydrate)
Appearance	pale green crystals
Density	3.87 g/cm^{3} (anhydrous); 2.3 g/cm^{3} (trihydrate)
Melting point	> 1,000 °C (1,830 °F; 1,270 K)
Solubility in water	slightly soluble (anhydrous); 49.5 g/100 mL (trihydrate)
Solubility	negligible in alcohol, ether, benzene
Magnetic susceptibility (χ)	+13,760·10^{−6} cm^{3}/mol

Structure
Crystal structure	Rhombohedral, hR24
Space group	R-3c, No. 167

Hazards
- GHS labelling
Pictograms	(GHS05: Corrosive) (GHS06: Toxic) (GHS07: Exclamation mark)
Signal word	Danger
Hazard statements	H301, H302, H311, H312, H314, H331, H332
Precautionary statements	P260, P262, P264, P270, P271, P280, P301+P316, P301+P317, P301+P330+P331, P302+P352, P302+P361+P354, P304+P340, P305+P354+P338, P316, P317, P321, P330, P361+P364, P362+P364, P363, P403+P233, P405, P501
Threshold limit value (TLV)	2.5 mg/m^{3} as F 1 mg/m^{3} as Fe (sol. iron salts)
- Lethal dose or concentration (LD, LC)
LD_{50} (median dose)	601 mg/kg (mouse, ip)
- NIOSH (US health exposure limits)
PEL (Permissible)	2.5 mg/m^{3}, as F

Related compounds
Other anions	Iron(III) oxide; Iron(III) chloride
Other cations	Manganese(III) fluoride; Cobalt(III) fluoride; Ruthenium(III) fluoride
Related compounds	Iron(II) fluoride
- Except where otherwise noted, data are given for materials in their standard state (at 25 °C [77 °F], 100 kPa). verify (what is ?) Infobox references

Iron(III) fluoride, also known as ferric fluoride, are inorganic compounds with the formula FeF_{3}(H_{2}O)_{x} where x = 0 or 3. They are mainly of interest by researchers, unlike the related iron(III) chloride. Anhydrous iron(III) fluoride is white, whereas the hydrated forms are light pink.

== Chemical and physical properties ==
Iron(III) fluoride is a thermally robust, antiferromagnetic solid consisting of high spin Fe(III) centers, which is consistent with the pale colors of all forms of this material. Both anhydrous iron(III) fluoride as well as its hydrates are hygroscopic.

== Structure ==
The anhydrous form adopts a simple structure with octahedral Fe(III)F_{6} centres interconnected by linear Fe-F-Fe linkages. In the language of crystallography, the crystals are classified as rhombohedral with an R-3c space group. The structural motif is similar to that seen in ReO_{3}. Although the solid is nonvolatile, it evaporates at high temperatures, the gas at 987 °C consists of FeF_{3}, a planar molecule of D_{3h} symmetry with three equal Fe-F bonds, each of length 176.3 pm. At very high temperatures, it decomposes to give FeF_{2} and F_{2}.

Two crystalline forms—or more technically, polymorphs—of FeF_{3}·3H_{2}O are known, the α and β forms. These are prepared by evaporation of an HF solution containing Fe^{3+} at room temperature (α form) and above 50 °C (β form). The space group of the β form is P4/m, and the α form maintains a P4/m space group with a J6 substructure. The solid α form is unstable and converts to the β form within days. The two forms are distinguished by their difference in quadrupole splitting from their Mössbauer spectra.

== Preparation, occurrence, reactions ==
Anhydrous iron(III) fluoride is prepared by treating virtually any anhydrous iron compound with fluorine. More practically and like most metal fluorides, it is prepared by treating the corresponding chloride with hydrogen fluoride:

FeCl_{3} + 3 HF → FeF_{3} + 3 HCl

It also forms as a passivating film upon contact between iron (and steel) and hydrogen fluoride. The hydrates crystallize from aqueous hydrofluoric acid.

The material is a fluoride acceptor. With xenon hexafluoride it forms [XeF_{5}]^{+}[FeF_{4}]^{−}.

Pure FeF_{3} is not yet known among minerals. However, hydrated form is known as the very rare fumarolic mineral topsøeite. Generally a trihydrate, its chemistry is slightly more complex: FeF[F_{0.5}(H_{2}O)_{0.5}]_{4}·H_{2}O.

== Applications ==
The primary commercial use of iron(III) fluoride in the production of ceramics.

Some cross coupling reaction are catalyzed by ferric fluoride-based compounds. Specifically the coupling of biaryl compounds are catalyzed by hydrated iron(II) fluoride complexes of N-heterocyclic carbene ligands. Other metal fluorides also catalyse similar reactions. Iron(III) fluoride has also been shown to catalyze chemoselective addition of cyanide to aldehydes to give the cyanohydrins.

== Safety ==
The anhydrous material is a powerful dehydrating agent. The formation of ferric fluoride may have been responsible for the explosion of a cylinder of hydrogen fluoride gas.
