= Ruthenium pentafluoride =

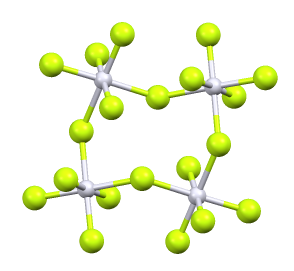

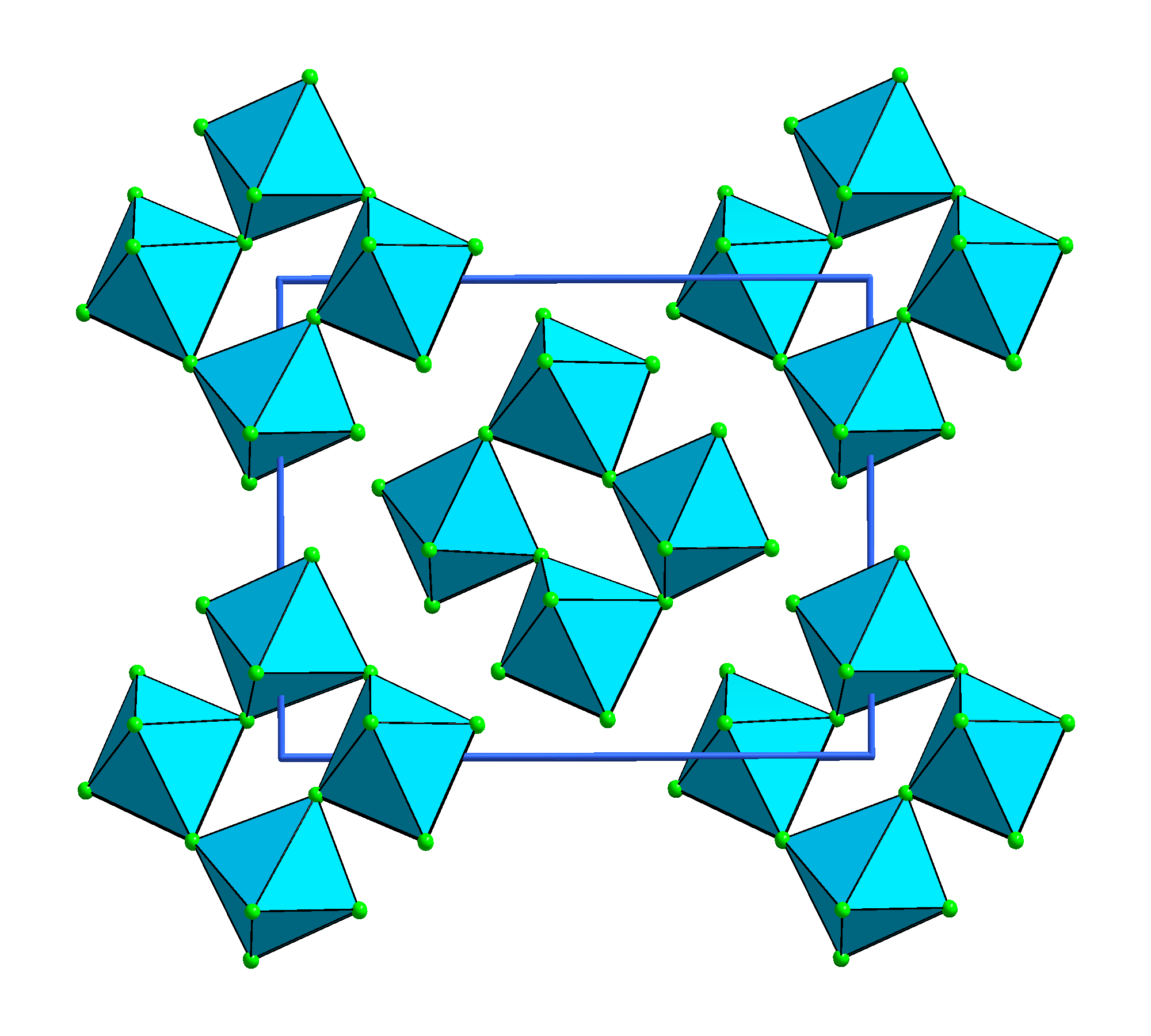

Names
- IUPAC name ruthenium(V) fluoride
- Other names Ruthenium(V) fluoride, Ruthenium(5+) pentafluoride

Identifiers
CAS Number	14521-18-7
3D model (JSmol)	monomer: Interactive image; tetramer: Interactive image
ChemSpider	103872048
ECHA InfoCard	100.035.015
EC Number	238-533-8
PubChem CID	101946419
CompTox Dashboard (EPA)	DTXSID20932536
- InChI: InChI=1S/5FH.Ru/h5*1H;/q;;;;;+5/p-5 Key: IUSPGFXRAJDYRG-UHFFFAOYSA-I
- SMILES: monomer: F[Ru](F)(F)(F)F; tetramer: F[Ru-]1(F)(F)(F)[F+][Ru-](F)(F)(F)(F)[F+][Ru-](F)(F)(F)(F)[F+][Ru-](F)(F)(F)(F)[F+]1

Properties
Chemical formula	F_{5}Ru
Molar mass	196.06 g/mol
Appearance	green solid
Density	3.82 g/cm^{3}
Melting point	86.5 °C (187.7 °F; 359.6 K)
Boiling point	227 °C (441 °F; 500 K)
- Except where otherwise noted, data are given for materials in their standard state (at 25 °C [77 °F], 100 kPa). Infobox references

Ruthenium pentafluoride is the inorganic compound with the empirical formula RuF_{5}. This green volatile solid has rarely been studied but is of interest as a binary fluoride of ruthenium, i.e. a compound containing only Ru and F. It is sensitive toward hydrolysis. Its structure consists of Ru_{4}F_{20} tetramers, as seen in the isostructural platinum pentafluoride. Within the tetramers, each Ru adopts octahedral molecular geometry, with two bridging fluoride ligands.

Ruthenium pentafluoride reacts with iodine to give ruthenium(III) fluoride.
