= Iron(III) bromide =

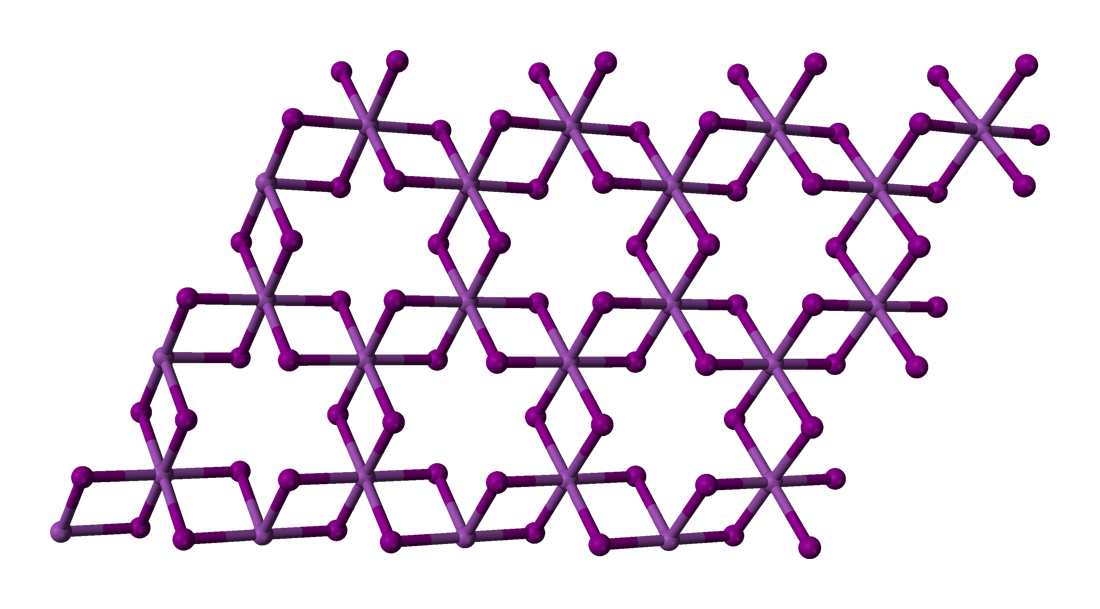

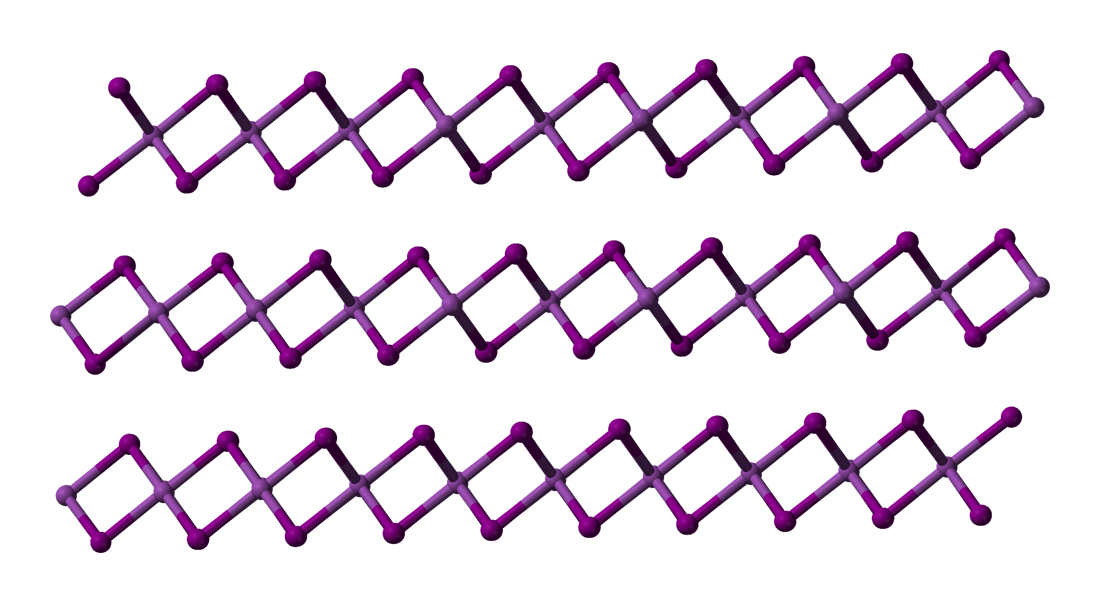

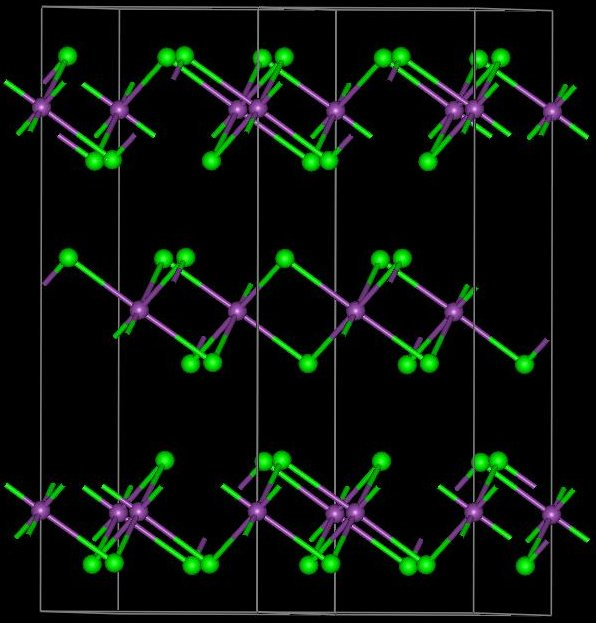

Names
- IUPAC name Iron(III) bromide
- Other names Ferric bromide Iron tribromide tribromoiron

Identifiers
CAS Number	10031-26-2
3D model (JSmol)	Interactive image
ChemSpider	23830
ECHA InfoCard	100.030.069
EC Number	233-089-1
PubChem CID	25554
UNII	9RDO128EH7
CompTox Dashboard (EPA)	DTXSID40894107
- InChI: InChI=1S/3BrH.Fe/h3*1H;/q;;;+3/p-3 Key: FEONEKOZSGPOFN-UHFFFAOYSA-K; InChI=1/3BrH.Fe/h3*1H;/q;;;+3/p-3 Key: FEONEKOZSGPOFN-DFZHHIFOAP
- SMILES: [Fe](Br)(Br)Br

Properties
Chemical formula	FeBr_{3}
Molar mass	295.56 g mol^{−1}
Appearance	brown solid
Odor	odorless
Density	4.50 g cm^{−3}
Melting point	200 °C (392 °F; 473 K) (decomposes)

Structure
Crystal structure	Trigonal, hR24
Space group	R-3, No. 148

Hazards
- Occupational safety and health (OHS/OSH)
Main hazards	corrosive
- GHS labelling
Pictograms	(GHS07: Exclamation mark)
Signal word	Warning
Hazard statements	H315, H319, H335
NFPA 704 (fire diamond)	3 0 0
- Except where otherwise noted, data are given for materials in their standard state (at 25 °C [77 °F], 100 kPa). verify (what is ?) Infobox references

Iron(III) bromide is the chemical compound with the formula FeBr_{3}. Also known as ferric bromide, this red-brown odorless compound is used as a Lewis acid catalyst in the halogenation of aromatic compounds. It dissolves in water to give acidic solutions.

== Structure, synthesis and basic properties ==
FeBr_{3} forms a polymeric structure featuring six-coordinate, octahedral Fe centers. Although inexpensively available commercially, FeBr_{3} can be prepared by treatment of iron metal with bromine:

2 Fe + 3 Br_{2} → 2 FeBr_{3}

Above 200 °C, FeBr_{3} decomposes to ferrous bromide:

2FeBr_{3} → 2FeBr_{2} + Br_{2}

Iron(III) chloride is considerably more stable, reflecting the greater oxidizing power of chlorine. FeI_{3} is not stable, as iron(III) will oxidize iodide ions.

== Uses ==
Ferric bromide is occasionally used as an oxidant in organic chemistry, e.g. for the conversion of alcohols to ketones. It is used as a Lewis acidic catalyst for bromination of aromatic compounds. For the latter applications, it is often generated in situ.

== See also ==
- Iron(II) bromide, the lower bromide of iron
