= Rhodium trifluoride =

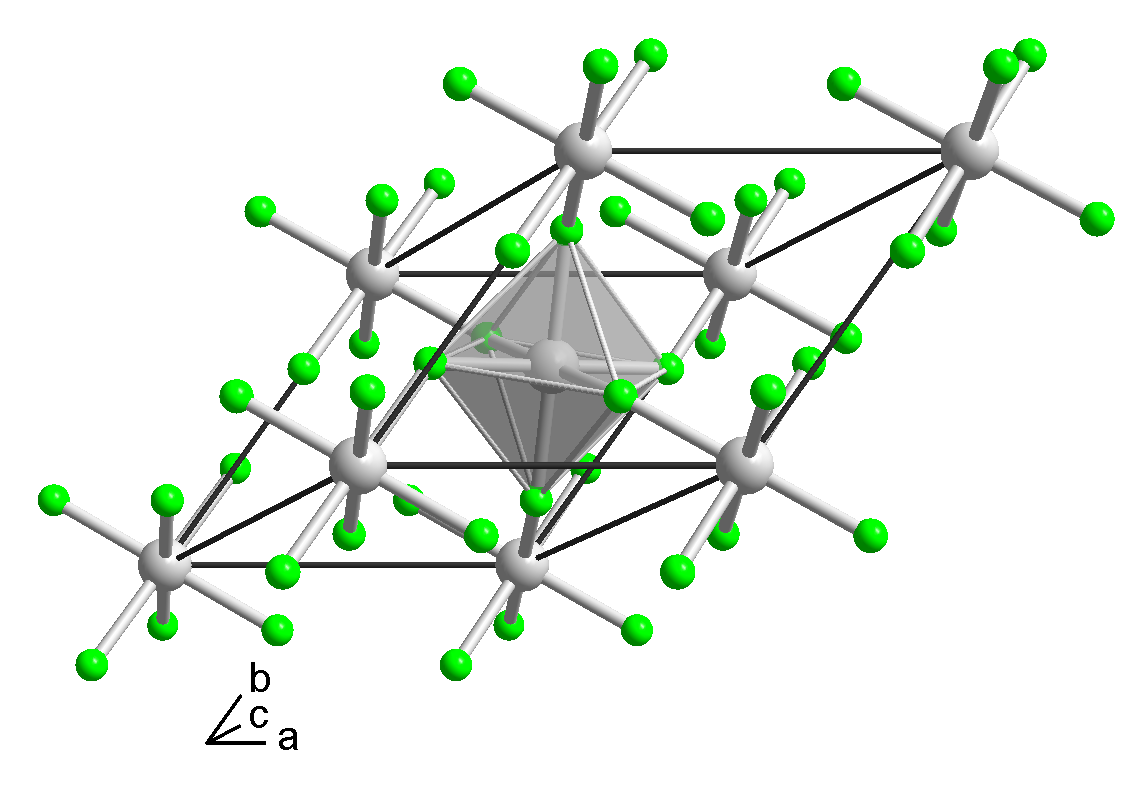

Names
- IUPAC name Rhodium(III) fluoride
- Other names Rhodium trifluoride

Identifiers
CAS Number	60804-25-3
3D model (JSmol)	Interactive image
ChemSpider	28687977
PubChem CID	21688473
CompTox Dashboard (EPA)	DTXSID601336941 DTXSID90578682, DTXSID601336941
- InChI: InChI=1S/3FH.Rh/h3*1H;/q;;;+3/p-3 Key: TXUZMGFRPPRPQA-UHFFFAOYSA-K
- SMILES: [F-].[F-].[F-].[Rh+3]

Properties
Chemical formula	RhF_{3}
Molar mass	159.90070 g·mol^{−1}
Appearance	red-brown solid
Density	5.38 g/cm^{3}

Structure
Crystal structure	Trigonal
Space group	R3c
Lattice constant	a = 4.873, c = 13.550
Formula units (Z)	6
- Except where otherwise noted, data are given for materials in their standard state (at 25 °C [77 °F], 100 kPa). Infobox references

Rhodium(III) fluoride or rhodium trifluoride is the inorganic compound with the formula RhF_{3}. It is a red-brown, diamagnetic solid.

== Synthesis and structure ==
The compound is prepared by fluorination of rhodium trichloride:

2 RhCl_{3} + 3 F_{2} → 2 RhF_{3} + 3 Cl_{2}

It can also be obtained by direct combination of the elements:

2 Rh + 3 F_{2} → 2 RhF_{3}

Anhydrous RhF_{3} is insoluble in water and does not react with it, but the hydrates RhF_{3}·6H_{2}O and RhF_{3}·9H_{2}O can be prepared by adding hydrofluoric acid to aqueous rhodium(III) solutions.

According to X-ray crystallography, the compound adopts the same structure as vanadium trifluoride, wherein the metal achieves octahedral coordination geometry.
