= Tin(II) fluoride =

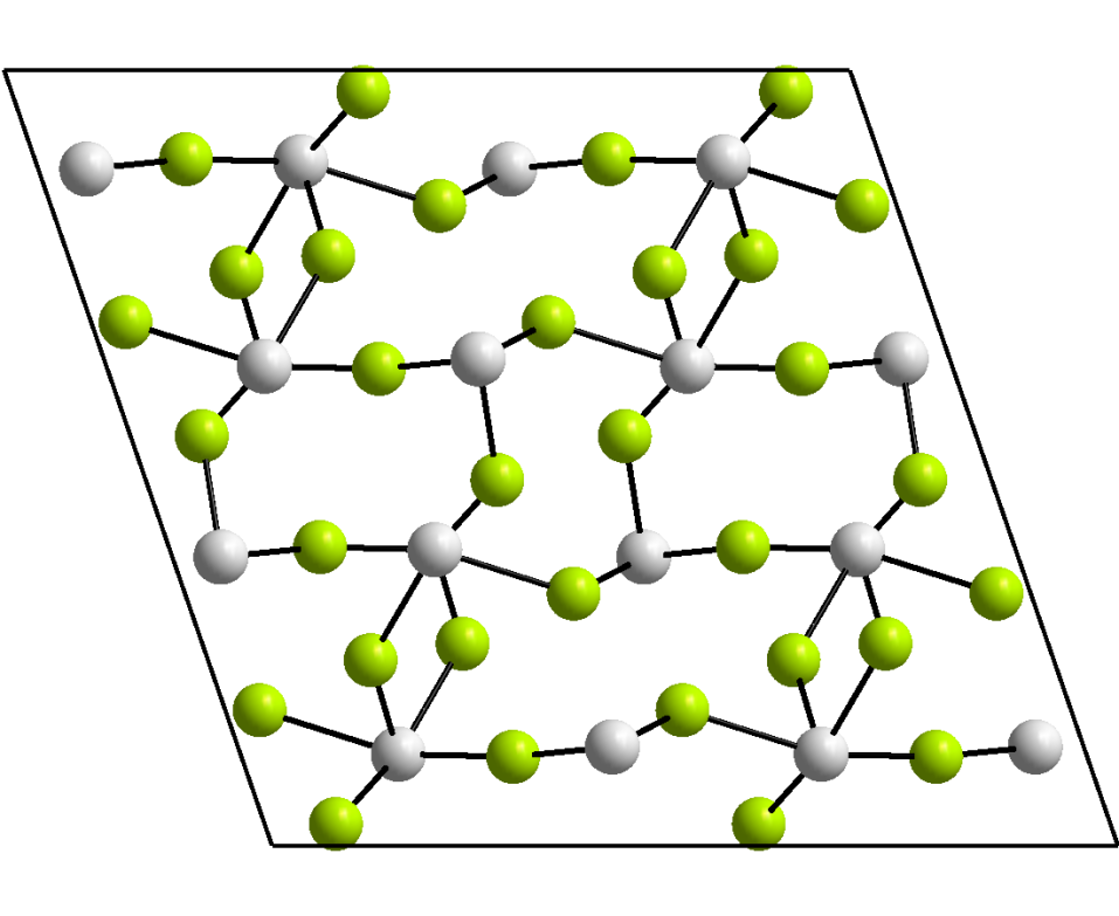
- Sn^{2+}; F^{−}

Names
- IUPAC name Tin(II) fluoride
- Other names Stannous fluoride

Identifiers
CAS Number	7783-47-3
3D model (JSmol)	Interactive image
ChEBI	CHEBI:135933
ChemSpider	22956
DrugBank	DB11092
ECHA InfoCard	100.029.090
EC Number	231-999-3
KEGG	D05919
PubChem CID	24550
RTECS number	XQ3450000
UNII	3FTR44B32Q
UN number	3288
CompTox Dashboard (EPA)	DTXSID6064822
- InChI: InChI=1S/2FH.Sn/h2*1H;/q;;+2/p-2 Key: ANOBYBYXJXCGBS-UHFFFAOYSA-L
- SMILES: F[Sn]F

Properties
Chemical formula	SnF_{2}
Molar mass	156.69 g/mol
Appearance	colorless solid
Density	4.57 g/cm^{3}
Melting point	213 °C (415 °F; 486 K)
Boiling point	850 °C (1,560 °F; 1,120 K)
Solubility in water	31 g/100 mL (0 °C); 35 g/100 mL (20 °C); 78.5 g/100 mL (106 °C)
Solubility	soluble in KOH, KF; negligible in ethanol, ether, chloroform

Structure
Crystal structure	Monoclinic, mS48
Space group	C2/c, No. 15

Pharmacology
ATC code	A01AA04 (WHO)

Hazards
NFPA 704 (fire diamond)	2 0 0
Flash point	Non-flammable
Safety data sheet (SDS)	ICSC 0860

Related compounds
Other anions	Tin(II) chloride, Tin(II) bromide, Tin(II) iodide
Other cations	Difluorocarbene, Carbon tetrafluoride, Difluorosilylene, Silicon tetrafluoride, Difluorogermylene, Germanium tetrafluoride, Tin tetrafluoride, Lead(II) fluoride, Lead(IV) fluoride
- Except where otherwise noted, data are given for materials in their standard state (at 25 °C [77 °F], 100 kPa). verify (what is ?) Infobox references

Tin(II) fluoride, commonly referred to commercially as stannous fluoride (from Latin stannum, 'tin'), is a chemical compound with the formula SnF_{2}. It is a colourless solid used as an ingredient in toothpastes.

== Oral health benefits ==
Stannous fluoride is an alternative to sodium fluoride for the prevention of cavities (tooth decay). It was first released commercially in 1956, in Crest toothpaste. It was discovered and developed by Joseph Muhler and William Nebergall. In recognition of their innovation, they were inducted into the Inventor's Hall of Fame.

The fluoride in stannous fluoride helps to convert the calcium mineral hydroxyapatite in teeth into fluorapatite, which makes tooth enamel more resistant to bacteria-generated acid attacks. The calcium present in plaque and saliva reacts with fluoride to form calcium fluoride on the tooth surface; over time, this calcium fluoride dissolves to allow calcium and fluoride ions to interact with the tooth and form fluoride-containing apatite within the tooth structure. This chemical reaction inhibits demineralisation and can promote remineralisation of tooth decay. The resulting fluoride-containing apatite is more insoluble, and more resistant to acid and tooth decay.

In addition to fluoride, the stannous ion has benefits for oral health when incorporated in a toothpaste. At similar fluoride concentrations, toothpastes containing stannous fluoride have been shown to be more effective than toothpastes containing sodium fluoride for reducing the incidence of dental caries and dental erosion, as well as reducing gingivitis. Some stannous fluoride-containing toothpastes also contain ingredients that improve stain removal. Stabilised stannous fluoride formulations provide greater bioavailability of the stannous and fluoride ion, increasing their oral health benefits. A systematic review revealed that stabilised stannous-fluoride–containing toothpastes had a positive effect on the reduction of plaque, gingivitis and staining, with a significant reduction in calculus and halitosis (bad breath) compared to other toothpastes. A specific formulation of stabilised stannous fluoride toothpastes has shown superior protection against dental erosion and dentine hypersensitivity compared to other fluoride-containing and fluoride-free toothpastes.

Stannous fluoride was once used under the trade name Fluoristan in the original formulation of the toothpaste brand Crest, though it was later replaced with sodium monofluorophosphate under the trade name Fluoristat. Stabilised stannous fluoride is now the active ingredient in Crest/Oral B Pro-Health brand toothpaste. Although concerns have been previously raised that stannous fluoride may cause tooth staining, this can be avoided by proper brushing and by using a stabilised stannous fluoride toothpaste. Any stannous fluoride staining that occurs due to improper brushing is not permanent, and Crest/Oral B Pro-Health states that its particular formulation is resistant to staining.

== Production ==
SnF_{2} can be prepared by evaporating a solution of SnO in 40% HF.

SnO + 2 HF → SnF_{2} + H_{2}O

== Aqueous solutions ==
Readily soluble in water, SnF_{2} is hydrolysed. At low concentration, it forms species such as SnOH^{+}, Sn(OH)_{2} and Sn(OH)_{3}^{−}. At higher concentrations, predominantly polynuclear species are formed, including Sn_{2}(OH)_{2}^{2+} and Sn_{3}(OH)_{4}^{2+}. Aqueous solutions readily oxidise to form insoluble precipitates of Sn^{IV}, which are ineffective as a dental prophylactic. Studies of the oxidation using Mössbauer spectroscopy on frozen samples suggests that O_{2} is the oxidizing species.

== Lewis acidity ==
SnF_{2} acts as a Lewis acid. For example, it forms a 1:1 complex (CH_{3})_{3}NSnF_{2} and 2:1 complex [(CH_{3})_{3}N]_{2}SnF_{2} with trimethylamine, and a 1:1 complex with dimethylsulfoxide, (CH_{3})_{2}SO·SnF_{2}.
In solutions containing the fluoride ion, F^{−}, it forms the fluoride complexes SnF_{3}^{−}, Sn_{2}F_{5}^{−}, and SnF_{2}(OH_{2}). Crystallization from an aqueous solution containing NaF produces compounds containing polynuclear anions, e.g. NaSn_{2}F_{5} or Na_{4}Sn_{3}F_{10} depending on the reaction conditions, rather than NaSnF_{3}. The compound NaSnF_{3}, containing the pyramidal SnF_{3}^{−} anion, can be produced from a pyridine–water solution. Other compounds containing the pyramidal SnF_{3}^{−} anion are known, such as Ca(SnF_{3})_{2}.

== Reducing properties ==
SnF_{2} is a reducing agent, with a standard reduction potential of E^{o} (Sn^{IV}/ Sn^{II}) = +0.15 V. Solutions in HF are readily oxidised by a range of oxidizing agents (O_{2}, SO_{2} or F_{2}) to form the mixed-valence compound Sn_{3}F_{8} (containing Sn^{II} and Sn^{IV} and no Sn–Sn bonds).

== Structure ==
The monoclinic form contains tetramers, Sn_{4}F_{8}, where there are two distinct coordination environments for the Sn atoms. In each case, there are three nearest neighbours, with Sn at the apex of a trigonal pyramid, and the lone pair of electrons sterically active. Other forms reported have the GeF_{2} and paratellurite structures.

== Molecular SnF_{2} ==
In the vapour phase, SnF_{2} forms monomers, dimers, and trimers. Monomeric SnF_{2} is a non-linear with an Sn−F bond length of 206 pm. Complexes of SnF_{2}, sometimes called difluorostannylene, with an alkyne and aromatic compounds deposited in an argon matrix at 12 K have been reported.

== Safety ==
Stannous fluoride can cause redness and irritation if it is inhaled or comes into contact with the eyes. If ingested, it can cause abdominal pains and shock. Rare but serious allergic reactions are possible; symptoms include itching, swelling, and difficulty breathing. Certain formulations of stannous fluoride in dental products may cause mild tooth discoloration; this is not permanent and can be removed by brushing, or can be prevented by using a stabilised stannous fluoride toothpaste.
