= Tetrabromide =

Tetrabromide may refer to:

- Carbon tetrabromide, CBr_{4}
- Germanium tetrabromide, GeBr_{4}
- Hafnium tetrabromide, HfBr_{4}
- Iridium tetrabromide, IrBr_{4}
- Neptunium tetrabromide, NpBr_{4}
- Osmium tetrabromide, OsBr_{4}
- Platinum tetrabromide, PtBr_{4}
- Polonium tetrabromide, PoBr_{4}
- Protactinium tetrabromide, PaBr_{4}
- Selenium tetrabromide, SeBr_{4}
- Silicon tetrabromide, SiBr_{4}
- Tellurium tetrabromide, TeBr_{4}
- Thorium tetrabromide, ThBr_{4}
- Tin tetrabromide, SnBr_{4}
- Titanium tetrabromide, TiBr_{4}
- Uranium tetrabromide, UBr_{4}
- Zirconium tetrabromide, ZrBr_{4}

== See also ==
- Acetylene tetrabromide or Tetrabromoethane (TBE), C_{2}H_{2}Br_{4}
- tetrafluoride
- tetrachloride
- tetraiodide
