= Tin iodide =

Tin iodide may refer to two different ionic compounds.

- Tin(II) iodide or stannous iodide
- Tin(IV) iodide or stannic iodide
