= Tin bromide =

Tin bromide can refer to the following:

- Tin(II) bromide, SnBr_{2}
- Tin(IV) bromide, SnBr_{4}
