= Germanium bromide =

Germanium bromide may refer to:

- Germanium(II) bromide (germanium dibromide), GeBr_{2}
- Germanium(IV) bromide (germanium tetrabromide), GeBr_{4}
