= Tin fluoride =

Tin fluoride can refer to:

- Tin(II) fluoride (stannous fluoride), SnF_{2}
- Tin(IV) fluoride (stannic fluoride), SnF_{4}
