= Germanium(II) iodide =

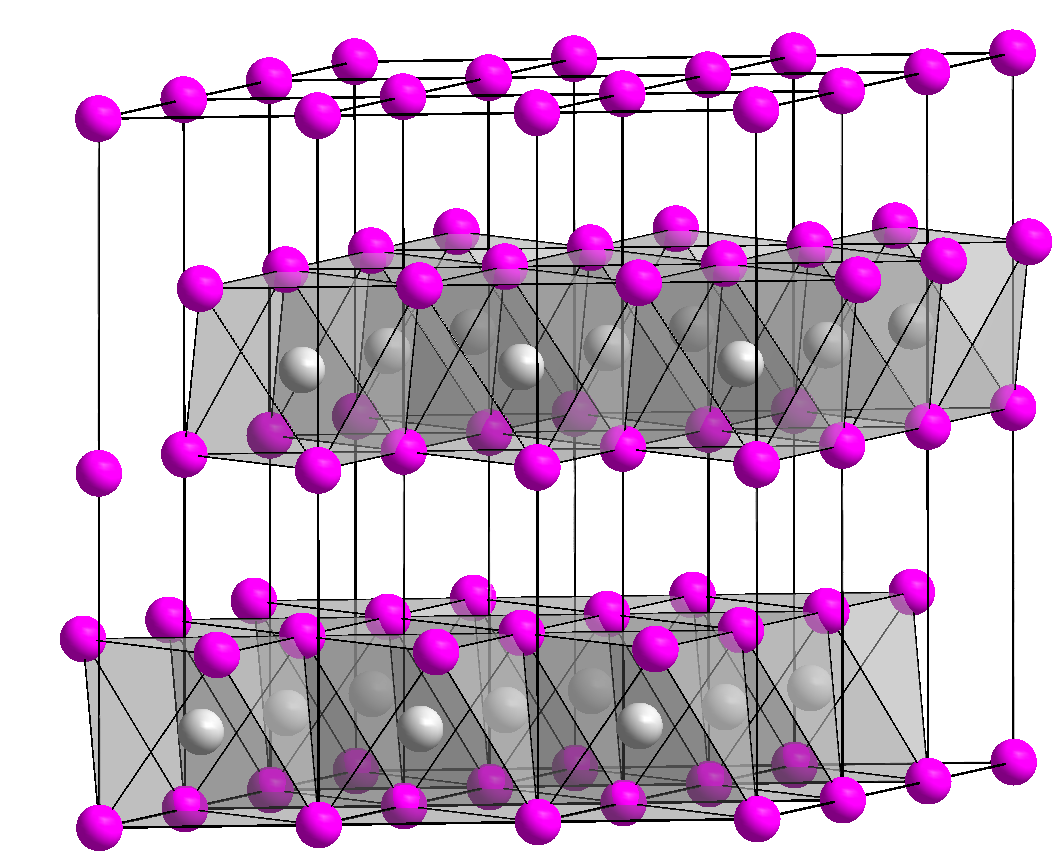

Identifiers
| CAS Number | 13573-08-5 |
| 3D model (JSmol) | Interactive image |
| ChemSpider | 4885744 |
| ECHA InfoCard | 100.033.620 |
| EC Number | 236-998-1 |
| PubChem CID | 6327215 |
| CompTox Dashboard (EPA) | DTXSID50929131 |
- InChI: InChI=1S/GeI2/c2-1-3 Key: IAGYEMVJHPEPGE-UHFFFAOYSA-N
- SMILES: I[Ge]I

Properties
| Chemical formula | GeI_{2} |
| Molar mass | 326.439 g·mol^{−1} |
| Appearance | yellow solid |
| Density | 5.37 g·cm^{−3} (25 °C) |
| Melting point | 428 °C |
| Boiling point | 550 °C (decomposes) |

Structure
| Space group | P3̅m1 (No. 164) |

Related compounds
| Other anions | germanium(II) fluoride germanium(II) chloride germanium(II) bromide |
| Other cations | tin(II) iodide lead(II) iodide |
| Related compounds | germanium(IV) iodide |
- Except where otherwise noted, data are given for materials in their standard state (at 25 °C [77 °F], 100 kPa). Infobox references

Germanium(II) iodide is an iodide of germanium, with the chemical formula of GeI_{2}.

== Preparation ==
Germanium(II) iodide can be produced by reacting germanium(IV) iodide with hydriodic acid and hypophosphorous acid and water:

GeI_{4} + H_{2}O + H_{3}PO_{2} → GeI_{2} + H_{3}PO_{3} + 2 HI

It can also be formed by the reaction of germanium monosulfide or germanium monoxide and hydrogen iodide.

GeO + 2 HI → GeI_{2} + H_{2}O

GeS + 2 HI → GeI_{2} + H_{2}S}

It can also be produced from the direct reaction of germanium and iodine at 200 – 400 °C:

Ge + I_{2} → GeI_{2}

Germanium(II) iodide can also be formed from the decomposition of HGeI_{3}, which can be prepared by reacting HGeCl_{3} with hydroiodic acid:

HGeCl_{3} + 3 HI → HGeI_{3} + HCl

HGeI_{3} → GeI_{2} + HI

== Properties ==
Germanium(II) iodide is a yellow crystal that slowly hydrolyzes into germanium(II) hydroxide in the presence of moisture. It is insoluble in hydrocarbons and slightly soluble in chloroform and carbon tetrachloride. It has a cadmium iodide structure with lattice parameters a = 413 pm and c = 679 pm. It disproportionates to germanium and germanium tetraiodide at 550 °C.

== Applications ==
Germanium(II) iodide can react with carbene to form stable compounds. It is also used in the electronics industry to produce germanium layers epitaxially through disproportionation reactions.
