= Lead fluoride =

Lead fluoride may refer to:

- Lead(II) fluoride (lead difluoride, plumbous fluoride, PbF_{2}), a white powder
- Lead(IV) fluoride (lead tetrafluoride, tetrafluoroplumbane, PbF_{4}), white to beige crystals
