= Barium hexafluorogermanate =

Names
- IUPAC name barium(2+); hexafluorogermanium(2-)

Identifiers
CAS Number	60897-63-4
3D model (JSmol)	Interactive image
ChemSpider	34996542
PubChem CID	16703831
- InChI: InChI=1S/Ba.F6Ge/c;1-7(2,3,4,5)6/q+2;-2 Key: AQQNUPLMYBELTR-UHFFFAOYSA-N
- SMILES: F[Ge-2](F)(F)(F)(F)F.[Ba+2]

Properties
Chemical formula	BaF_{6}Ge
Molar mass	323.947 g·mol^{−1}
Appearance	White crystals
Density	4.56 g/cm^{3}
Melting point	665

Hazards
- GHS labelling
Pictograms	(GHS06: Toxic)
Signal word	Danger
Hazard statements	H301, H332
- Except where otherwise noted, data are given for materials in their standard state (at 25 °C [77 °F], 100 kPa). Infobox references

Barium hexafluorogermanate is an inorganic chemical compound with the chemical formula BaGeF_{6}.

== Synthesis ==
Barium hexafluorogermanate can be prepared by reacting hydrofluoric acid with germanium dioxide and then with barium chloride.

== Chemical properties ==
The compound decomposes to germanium tetrafluoride when heated to about 700 °C.

BaGeF_{6} → BaF_{2} + GeF_{4}↑
