= Germanium dibromide =

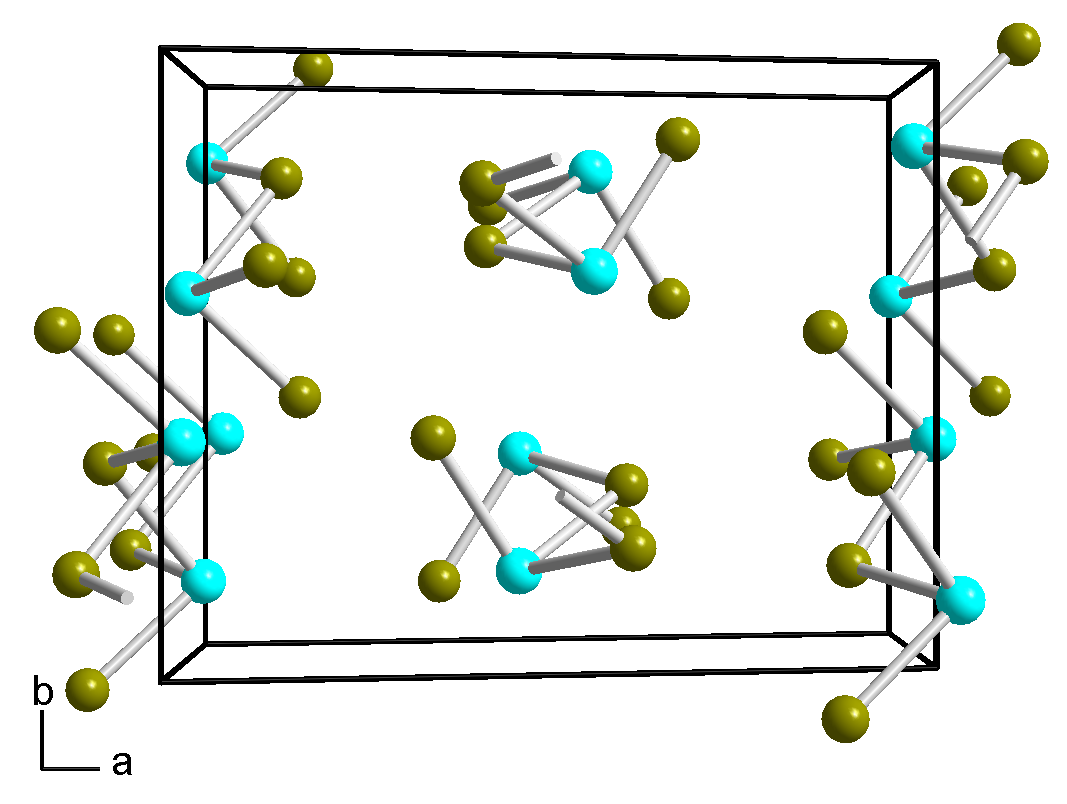

Identifiers
CAS Number	24415-00-7
3D model (JSmol)	Interactive image
ChemSpider	4885753
ECHA InfoCard	100.155.797
EC Number	627-437-5
PubChem CID	6327224
- InChI: InChI=1S/Br2Ge/c1-3-2 Key: DUVPPTXIBVUIKL-UHFFFAOYSA-N
- SMILES: Br[Ge]Br

Properties
Chemical formula	Br_{2}Ge
Molar mass	232.438 g·mol^{−1}
Appearance	white to pale yellow solid
Melting point	120–125 °C; 143–144 °C (when heating rapidly)

Hazards
- GHS labelling
Pictograms	(GHS05: Corrosive)
Signal word	Danger
Hazard statements	H314
Precautionary statements	P260, P264, P280, P301+P330+P331, P302+P361+P354, P304+P340, P305+P354+P338, P316, P321, P363, P405, P501

Related compounds
Other anions	Germanium difluoride Germanium dichloride Germanium diiodide
Other cations	Tin dibromide Lead dibromide
Related compounds	Germanium tetrabromide
- Except where otherwise noted, data are given for materials in their standard state (at 25 °C [77 °F], 100 kPa). Infobox references

Germanium dibromide is a bromide of germanium with the chemical formula GeBr_{2}.

== Preparation ==
Germanium dibromide can be obtained by reducing germanium tetrabromide with germanium or zinc.

Ge + GeBr_{4} → 2 GeBr_{2}

== Properties ==
Germanium dibromide is a yellow-white solid that is soluble in ethanol and acetone. It disproportionates into germanium tetrabromide and germanium. It hydrolyzes to germanium dihydroxide. Germanium dibromide is monoclinic, space group P2_{1}/c (No. 14), lattice parameters a = 11.68 Å, b = 9.12 Å, c = 7.02 Å, and β = 101.9°. It can react with cyclopentadienylsodium or cyclopentadienylthallium in ether solvent to form germanocene.
