= Iridium bromide =

Iridium bromide may refer to:

- Iridium(IV) bromide (iridium tetrabromide), IrBr_{4}
- Iridium(III) bromide (iridium tribromide), IrBr_{3}
