= Lithium hexafluorostannate =

Names
- IUPAC name Dilithium hexafluorostannate(2-)

Identifiers
CAS Number	17029-16-2
3D model (JSmol)	Interactive image
ChemSpider	19949061
- InChI: InChI=1S/6FH.2Li.Sn/h6*1H;;;/q;;;;;;2*+1;+4/p-6 Key: LDTWGZJNXIAELR-UHFFFAOYSA-H
- SMILES: [Li+].[Li+].F[Sn-2](F)(F)(F)(F)F

Properties
Chemical formula	F_{6}Li_{2}Sn
Molar mass	246.58 g·mol^{−1}
Appearance	White powder
Density	g/cm^{3}
Solubility in water	Insoluble

Hazards
- GHS labelling
Signal word	Danger
Hazard statements	H301, H315, H319, H335
- Except where otherwise noted, data are given for materials in their standard state (at 25 °C [77 °F], 100 kPa). Infobox references

Lithium hexafluorostannate is an inorganic chemical compound with the chemical formula Li_{2}SnF_{6}.

== Synthesis ==
The compound can be prepared by reacting ammonium hexachlorostannate, lithium carbonate, and fluorine gas at 400 °C, or by reacting lithium stannate with hydrofluoric acid.

== Physical properties ==
The compound forms white crystals of the monoclinic system.

Lithium hexafluorostannate forms a dihydrate.
