= Ammonium hexabromostannate(IV) =

Names
- Other names Diammonium hexabromostannate, ammonium tin bromide

Identifiers
| CAS Number | 16925-34-1 |
- InChI: Key: GRDTXJSFXZWQBO-UHFFFAOYSA-J

Properties
| Chemical formula | Br_{6}H_{8}N_{2}Sn |
| Molar mass | 634.212 g·mol^{−1} |
| Appearance | colorless crystals |
| Density | 3.50 g/cm^{3} |
| Solubility in water | soluble |
- Except where otherwise noted, data are given for materials in their standard state (at 25 °C [77 °F], 100 kPa). Infobox references

Ammonium hexabromostannate(IV) is an inorganic chemical compound with the chemical formula (NH_{4})_{2}SnBr_{6}.

== Synthesis ==
The compound can be prepared by mixing concentrated solutions of ammonium bromide and tin(IV) bromide in 47% hydrobromic acid.

== Physical properties ==
Ammonium hexabromostannate(IV) forms colorless crystals of cubic system, space group Fm3m. Soluble in water.
