= Ammonium hexachlorostannate =

Names
- IUPAC name diazanium; tin(4+); hexachloride
- Other names Ammonium hexachlorostannate(IV), ammonium tin chloride, stannic ammonium chloride, diammonium hexachlorostannate, pink salt

Identifiers
CAS Number	16960-53-5
3D model (JSmol)	Interactive image
ChemSpider	14921064
ECHA InfoCard	100.037.288
EC Number	241-033-2
PubChem CID	167595
- InChI: InChI=1S/6ClH.2H3N.Sn/h6*1H;2*1H3;/q;;;;;;;;+4/p-4 Key: UDMAVAHFQCVSSE-UHFFFAOYSA-J
- SMILES: [NH4+].[NH4+].[Cl-].[Cl-].[Cl-].[Cl-].[Cl-].[Cl-].[Sn+4]

Properties
Chemical formula	Cl_{6}H_{8}N_{2}Sn
Molar mass	367.49 g·mol^{−1}
Appearance	White acidic crystals
Density	2.5 g/cm^{3}

Hazards
- GHS labelling
Pictograms	(GHS07: Exclamation mark)
Signal word	Warning
Hazard statements	H315, H319, H335, H412
- Except where otherwise noted, data are given for materials in their standard state (at 25 °C [77 °F], 100 kPa). Infobox references

Ammonium hexachlorostannate (also known as pink salt) is an inorganic chemical compound with the chemical formula (NH_{4})_{2}SnCl_{6}.

== Synthesis ==
A reaction of pure tin tetrachloride with ammonium chloride:

SnCl_{4} + 2NH_{4}Cl → (NH_{4})_{2}SnCl_{6}

== Physical properties ==
The compound is composed of white crystals and is a corrosive agent.

== Use ==
The compound is used as a mordant in dyeing.
