= Germanium(IV) iodide =

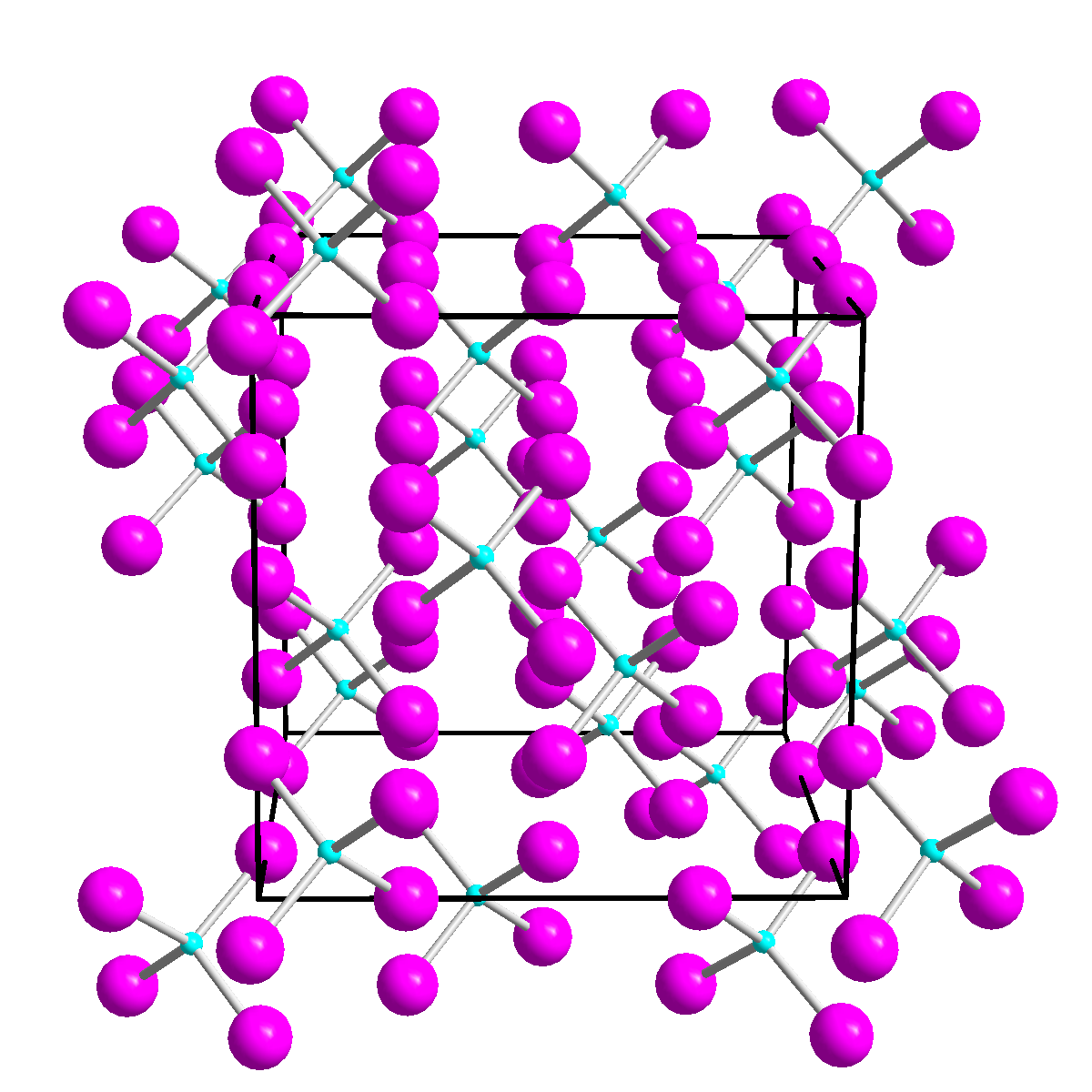

Identifiers
CAS Number	13450-95-8
3D model (JSmol)	Interactive image
ChemSpider	75317
ECHA InfoCard	100.033.271
EC Number	236-613-7
PubChem CID	83479
CompTox Dashboard (EPA)	DTXSID7065469
- InChI: InChI=1S/GeI4/c2-1(3,4)5 Key: CUDGTZJYMWAJFV-UHFFFAOYSA-N
- SMILES: [Ge](I)(I)(I)I

Properties
Chemical formula	GeI_{4}
Molar mass	580.248 g·mol^{−1}
Appearance	varies (thermochromic); red crystals (r.t.)
Density	4.32 g·cm^{−3}
Melting point	146 °C (419 K)
Solubility	Soluble in non-polar solvents such as carbon disulfide, chloroform and benzene

Hazards
- GHS labelling
Pictograms	(GHS05: Corrosive)
Signal word	Danger
Hazard statements	H314
Precautionary statements	P260, P264, P264+P265, P280, P301+P330+P331, P302+P361+P354, P304+P340, P305+P354+P338, P316, P317, P321, P363, P405, P501

Related compounds
Other anions	Germanium tetrafluoride; Germanium tetrachloride; Germanium tetrabromide
Other cations	Carbon tetraiodide; Silicon tetraiodide; Tin tetraiodide
Related compounds	Germanium(II) iodide
- Except where otherwise noted, data are given for materials in their standard state (at 25 °C [77 °F], 100 kPa). Infobox references

Germanium(IV) iodide is an inorganic compound with the chemical formula GeI_{4}.

== Preparation ==
Germanium(IV) iodide can be obtained by the reaction of germanium and iodine or the reaction of germanium dioxide and 57% hydriodic acid:

GeO_{2} + 4 HI → GeI_{4} + 2 H_{2}O

== Chemical properties ==
Germanium(IV) iodide reacts with tetraalkyl tin at 250 °C to form R_{2}SnI_{2} and R_{2}GeI_{2} (R= Et, Bu, Ph). It reacts with germanium and sulfur at high temperatures to produce red GeSI_{2} and orange Ge_{2}S_{3}I_{2}. It reacts with diiron nonacarbonyl in an ionic liquid ([BMIm]Cl/AlCl_{3}) at 130 °C to obtain Ge_{12}[Fe(CO)_{3}]_{8}I_{4}.

12 GeI_{4} + 15 Fe_{2}(CO)_{9} → Ge_{12}[Fe(CO)_{3}]_{8}I_{4} + 22 FeI_{2} + 111 CO↑

== Physical properties ==
Germanium(IV) iodide is an orange-red crystalline solid that hydrolyzes in water. It is soluble in carbon disulfide and benzene, but less soluble in carbon tetrachloride and chloroform. It begins to decompose into germanium(II) iodide and iodine above its melting point. Germanium(IV) iodide crystallizes in the cubic crystal system, space group Pa3̅ (space group no. 205), with the lattice parameter a = 11.89 Å. The crystal structure consists of tetrahedral GeI_{4} molecules.
