= Germanium tetrabromide =

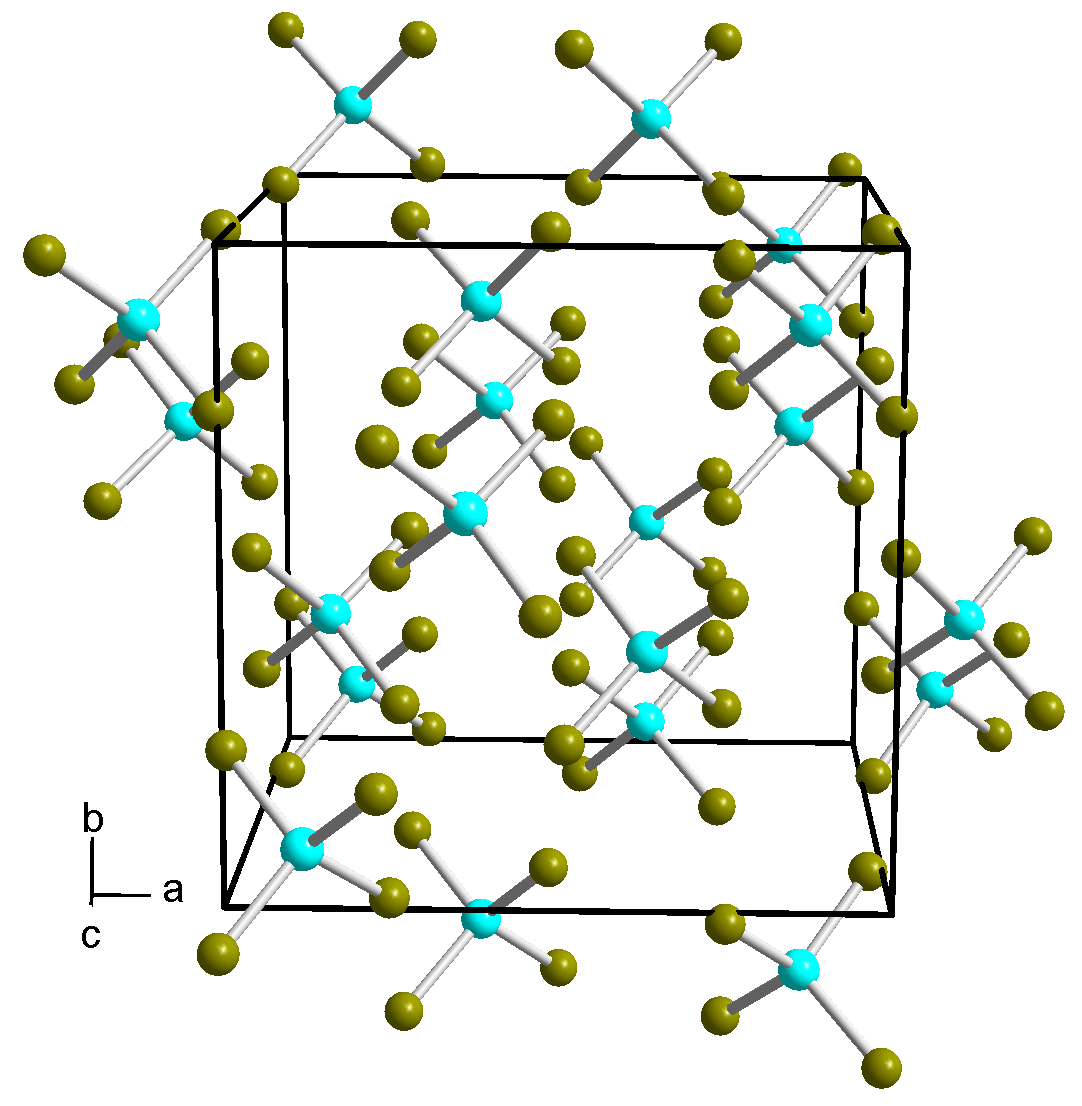

Names
- IUPAC name tetrabromogermane

Identifiers
CAS Number	13450-92-5
3D model (JSmol)	Interactive image
ChemSpider	24230
ECHA InfoCard	100.033.270
EC Number	236-612-1
PubChem CID	26011
CompTox Dashboard (EPA)	DTXSID2065468
- InChI: InChI=1S/Br4Ge/c1-5(2,3)4 Key: VJHDVMPJLLGYBL-UHFFFAOYSA-N
- SMILES: [Ge](Br)(Br)(Br)Br

Properties
Chemical formula	Br_{4}Ge
Molar mass	392.246 g·mol^{−1}
Appearance	Colorless solid
Density	2.123 g/cm^{3}
Melting point	26 °C (79 °F; 299 K)
Boiling point	185.9 °C (366.6 °F; 459.0 K)

Hazards
- GHS labelling
Pictograms	(GHS05: Corrosive)
Signal word	Danger
Hazard statements	H314
Precautionary statements	P260, P264, P280, P301+P330+P331, P303+P361+P353, P304+P340, P305+P351+P338, P310, P321, P363, P405, P501

Structure
Crystal structure	α-Cubic (SnI_{4} type) β-Monoclinic (SnBr_{4} type)

Thermochemistry
Std enthalpy of formation (Δ_{f}H^{⦵}_{298})	83.3 kcal/mol

Related compounds
Other anions	Germanium tetrafluoride Germanium tetrachloride Germanium tetraiodide
Other cations	Carbon tetrabromide Silicon tetrabromide Tin(IV) bromide
Related compounds	Germanium dibromide
- Except where otherwise noted, data are given for materials in their standard state (at 25 °C [77 °F], 100 kPa). Infobox references

Germanium tetrabromide is the inorganic compound with the formula GeBr_{4}. It is a colorless solid that melts near room temperature. It can be formed by treating solid germanium with bromine, or by treating a germanium-copper mixture with bromine:

Ge + Br_{2} → GeBr_{4}

From this reaction, GeBr_{4} has a heat of formation of 83.3 kcal/mol.

The compound is liquid at 25 °C, and forms an interlocking liquid structure. From room temperature down to −60 °C the structure takes on a cubic α form, whereas at lower temperatures it takes on a monoclinic β form.
