= Germanium tetrafluoride =

Names
- IUPAC names Germanium tetrafluoride Tetrafluorogermane; Tetrafluoridogermanium
- Other names Germanium(IV) fluoride Germanium fluoride

Identifiers
CAS Number	7783-58-6
3D model (JSmol)	Interactive image
ChemSpider	74195
ECHA InfoCard	100.029.101
EC Number	232-011-3
PubChem CID	82215
UNII	X83T8V2NRK
CompTox Dashboard (EPA)	DTXSID1064829
- InChI: InChI=1S/F4Ge/c1-5(2,3)4 Key: PPMWWXLUCOODDK-UHFFFAOYSA-N
- SMILES: F[Ge](F)(F)F

Properties
Chemical formula	GeF_{4}
Molar mass	148.634 g/mol
Appearance	colourless gas
Density	6.074 g/L (gas), 2.46 g/mL (liquid)
Melting point	−15 °C (5 °F; 258 K) at 4 bar
Boiling point	−36.5 °C (−33.7 °F; 236.7 K) sublimates
Magnetic susceptibility (χ)	−50.0·10^{−6} cm^{3}/mol

Structure
Molecular shape	tetrahedral

Thermochemistry
Std enthalpy of formation (Δ_{f}H^{⦵}_{298})	−8.008 kJ/g

Hazards
- Occupational safety and health (OHS/OSH)
Main hazards	Reacts with water to form HF, corrosive
- GHS labelling
Pictograms	(GHS05: Corrosive) (GHS06: Toxic) (GHS08: Health hazard)
Signal word	Danger
Hazard statements	H314, H331, H372
Precautionary statements	P260, P264, P270, P271, P280, P301+P330+P331, P303+P361+P353, P304+P340, P305+P351+P338, P310, P311, P314, P321, P363, P403+P233, P405, P410+P403, P501
NFPA 704 (fire diamond)	3 0 2 W
Flash point	Non-flammable

Related compounds
Other anions	Germanium tetrachloride Germanium tetrabromide Germanium tetraiodide
Other cations	Carbon tetrafluoride Silicon tetrafluoride Tin tetrafluoride Lead tetrafluoride
Related compounds	Germanium difluoride
- Except where otherwise noted, data are given for materials in their standard state (at 25 °C [77 °F], 100 kPa). verify (what is ?) Infobox references

Germanium tetrafluoride (GeF_{4}) is a chemical compound of germanium and fluorine. It is a colorless gas.

== Synthesis ==
Germanium tetrafluoride is formed by treating germanium with fluorine:

Ge + 2 F_{2} → GeF_{4}

Alternatively germanium dioxide combines with hydrofluoric acid (HF):

GeO_{2} + 4 HF → GeF_{4} + 2 H_{2}O

It is also formed during the thermal decomposition of a complex salt, Ba[GeF_{6}]:

Ba(GeF_{6}) → GeF_{4} + BaF_{2}

== Properties ==
Germanium tetrafluoride is a noncombustible, strongly fuming gas with a garlic-like odor. It reacts with water to form hydrofluoric acid and germanium dioxide. Decomposition occurs above 1000 °C.

Reaction of GeF_{4} with fluoride sources produces GeF_{5}^{−} anions with octahedral coordination around Ge atom due to polymerization. The structural characterization of a discrete trigonal bipyramidal GeF_{5}^{−} anion was achieved by a "naked" fluoride reagent 1,3-bis(2,6-diisopropylphenyl)imidazolium fluoride.

== Uses ==
In combination with disilane, germanium tetrafluoride is used for in the synthesis of SiGe.
