= Tin(IV) fluoride =

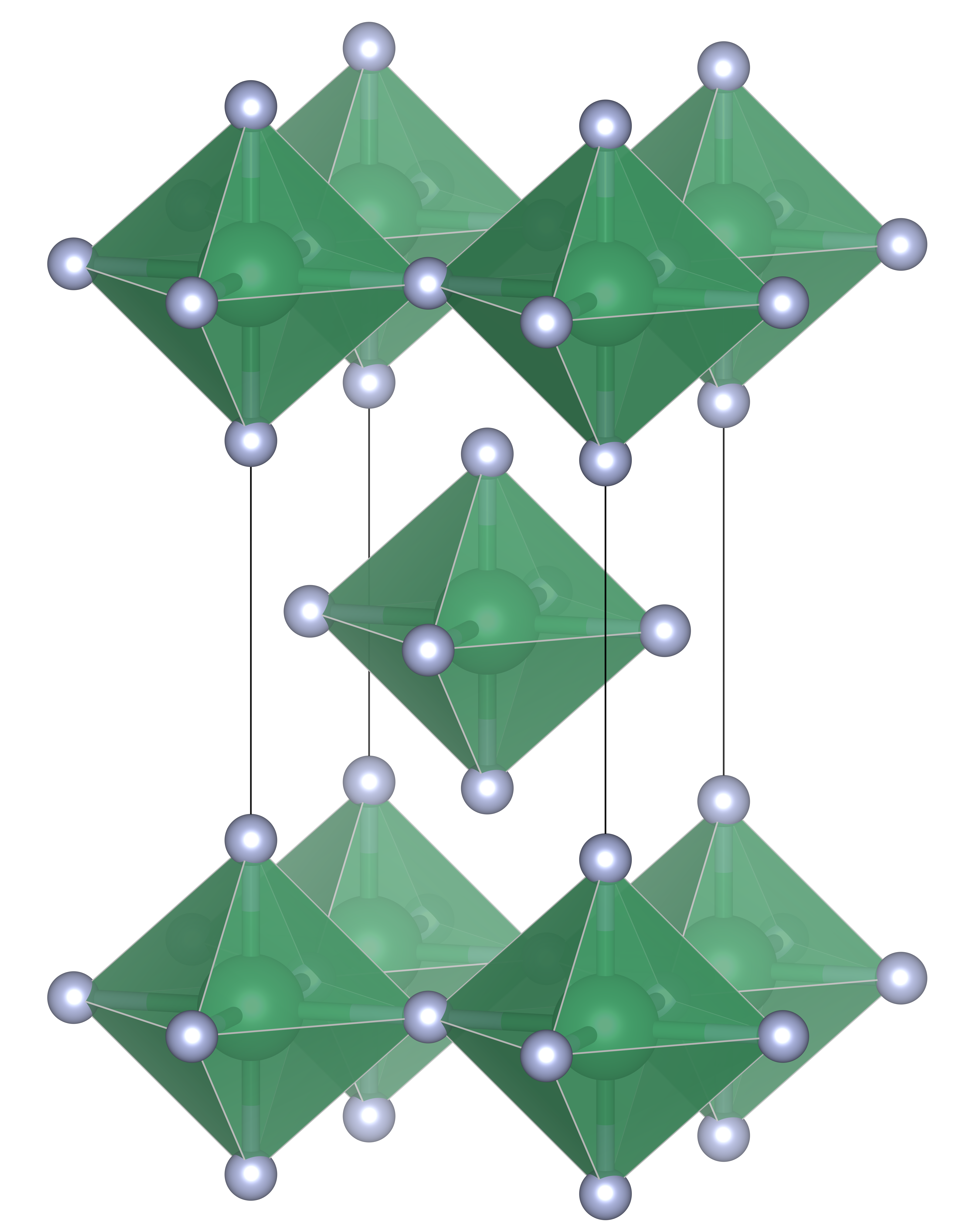
- Unit cell of tin(IV) fluoride

Names
- IUPAC name tin(IV) fluoride
- Other names stannic fluoride, tin tetrafluoride

Identifiers
CAS Number	7783-62-2
3D model (JSmol)	Interactive image
ChemSpider	118680
ECHA InfoCard	100.029.105
EC Number	232-016-0
PubChem CID	134654
UNII	HNZ2XMR1ZF
- InChI: InChI=1S/4FH.Sn/h4*1H;/q;;;;+4/p-4 Key: YUOWTJMRMWQJDA-UHFFFAOYSA-J
- SMILES: [F-].[F-].[F-].[F-].[Sn+4]

Properties
Chemical formula	SnF_{4}
Molar mass	194.704 g/mol
Appearance	white solid
Density	4.78 g / cm^{3}
Melting point	above 700 °C (sublimes)

Structure
Crystal structure	Tetragonal, tI10
Space group	I4/mmm, No. 139

Hazards
- GHS labelling
Pictograms	(GHS05: Corrosive) (GHS07: Exclamation mark)
Signal word	Danger
Hazard statements	H302, H312, H314, H332
Precautionary statements	P260, P264, P270, P271, P280, P301+P317, P301+P330+P331, P302+P352, P302+P361+P354, P304+P340, P305+P354+P338, P316, P317, P321, P330, P362+P364, P363, P405, P501

Related compounds
Other anions	Tin(IV) chloride Tin(IV) bromide Tin(IV) iodide
Other cations	Carbon tetrafluoride Silicon tetrafluoride Germanium tetrafluoride Lead tetrafluoride
Related compounds	Tin(II) fluoride
- Except where otherwise noted, data are given for materials in their standard state (at 25 °C [77 °F], 100 kPa). verify (what is ?) Infobox references

Tin(IV) fluoride is a chemical compound of tin and fluorine with the chemical formula SnF_{4}. It is a white solid. As reflected by its melting point above 700 °C, the tetrafluoride differs significantly from the other tetrahalides of tin.

== Synthesis and reaction ==
SnF_{4} can be prepared by the reaction of tin(IV) chloride with anhydrous hydrogen fluoride:

SnCl_{4} + 4HF → SnF_{4} + 4HCl

When treated with alkali metal fluorides (e.g. KF), tin(IV) fluoride forms hexafluorostannates:

SnF_{4} + 2 KF → K_{2}SnF_{6}

In K_{2}SnF_{6}, tin adopts an octahedral geometry.

Otherwise, SnF_{4} behaves as a Lewis acid forming a variety of adducts with the formula L_{2}·SnF_{4} and L·SnF_{4}.

== Structure ==
Unlike the heavier tin tetrahalides, which contain tetrahedrally coordinated tin, tin(IV) fluoride contains octahedrally coordinated tin. The octahedra share four corners. There are two terminal, unshared, fluorine atoms trans to one another. The melting point of SnF_{4} is much higher (700 °C) than the other tin(IV) halides: (SnCl_{4}, −33.3 °C; SnBr_{4}, 31 °C; SnI_{4}, 144 °C). The structure can also be contrasted with the tetrafluorides of the lighter members of group 14, (CF_{4}, SiF_{4} and GeF_{4}), all of which in the solid state form molecular crystals.

== See also ==
- Stannous fluoride
