= Tin(IV) chloride =

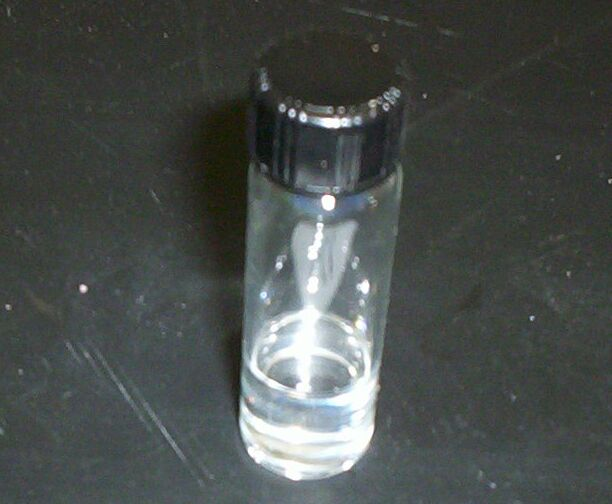
Tin (IV) chloride
Anhydrous Tin(IV) chloride
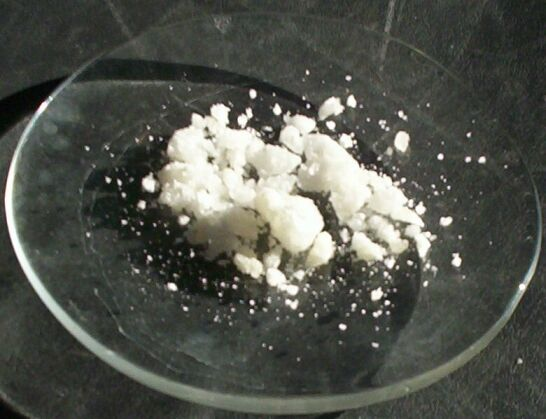
Tin(IV) chloride pentahydrate.jpg
Tin(IV) chloride pentahydrate

Names
- IUPAC name: Tetrachlorostannane; Tin tetrachloride; Tin(IV) chloride
- Other names Stannic chloride

Identifiers
CAS Number	7646-78-8; 10026-06-9 (pentahydrate)
3D model (JSmol)	anhydrous: Interactive image; pentahydrate: Interactive image
ChemSpider	22707
ECHA InfoCard	100.028.717
EC Number	231-588-9
PubChem CID	24287
RTECS number	XP8750000
UNII	67H76LFL3V
UN number	1827
CompTox Dashboard (EPA)	DTXSID1029679
- InChI: InChI=1S/4ClH.Sn/h4*1H;/q;;;;+4/p-4 Key: HPGGPRDJHPYFRM-UHFFFAOYSA-J; InChI=1/4ClH.Sn/h4*1H;/q;;;;+4/p-4 Key: HPGGPRDJHPYFRM-XBHQNQODAC
- SMILES: anhydrous: Cl[Sn](Cl)(Cl)Cl; pentahydrate: Cl[Sn-2](Cl)(Cl)([OH2+])([OH2+])Cl.O.O.O

Properties
Chemical formula	SnCl_{4}
Molar mass	260.50 g/mol (anhydrous); 350.60 g/mol (pentahydrate)
Appearance	Colorless fuming liquid
Odor	Acrid
Density	2.226 g/cm^{3} (anhydrous); 2.04 g/cm^{3} (pentahydrate)
Melting point	−34.07 °C (−29.33 °F; 239.08 K) (anhydrous); 56 °C (133 °F; 329 K) (pentahydrate)
Boiling point	114.15 °C (237.47 °F; 387.30 K)
Solubility in water	hydrolysis, very hygroscopic (anhydrous); very soluble (pentahydrate)
Solubility	soluble in alcohols, toluene, chloroform, acetone, hydrocarbons, CCl_{4}, CS_{2}
Vapor pressure	2.4 kPa (18 mmHg)
Magnetic susceptibility (χ)	−115×10^{−6} cm^{3}/mol
Refractive index (n_{D})	1.512

Structure
Crystal structure	Monoclinic
Space group	P2_{1}/c
Point group	2/m
Lattice constant	a = 9.8642 Å, b = 6.6800 Å, c = 9.9377 Å α = 90°, β = 102.945°, γ = 90°
Lattice volume (V)	638.2 Å^{3}
Formula units (Z)	4

Hazards
- GHS labelling
Pictograms	(GHS05: Corrosive)
Signal word	Danger
Hazard statements	H314, H412
Precautionary statements	P260, P264, P273, P280, P301+P330+P331, P303+P361+P353, P304+P340, P305+P351+P338, P310, P321, P363, P405, P501
NFPA 704 (fire diamond)	3 0 1
Safety data sheet (SDS)	ICSC 0953

Related compounds
Other anions	Tin(IV) fluoride; Tin(IV) bromide; Tin(IV) iodide
Other cations	Carbon tetrachloride; Silicon tetrachloride; Germanium tetrachloride; Lead(IV) chloride
Related compounds	Tin(II) chloride
- Except where otherwise noted, data are given for materials in their standard state (at 25 °C [77 °F], 100 kPa). verify (what is ?) Infobox references

Tin(IV) chloride, also known as tin tetrachloride or stannic chloride, is an inorganic compound of tin and chlorine with the formula SnCl_{4}. It is a colorless hygroscopic liquid, which fumes on contact with air. It is used as a precursor to other tin compounds. It was first discovered by Andreas Libavius (1550–1616) and was known as spiritus fumans libavii.

== Preparation ==
It is prepared from reaction of chlorine gas with tin at 115 °C (239 °F):

Sn + 2Cl_{2} → SnCl_{4}

== Structure ==
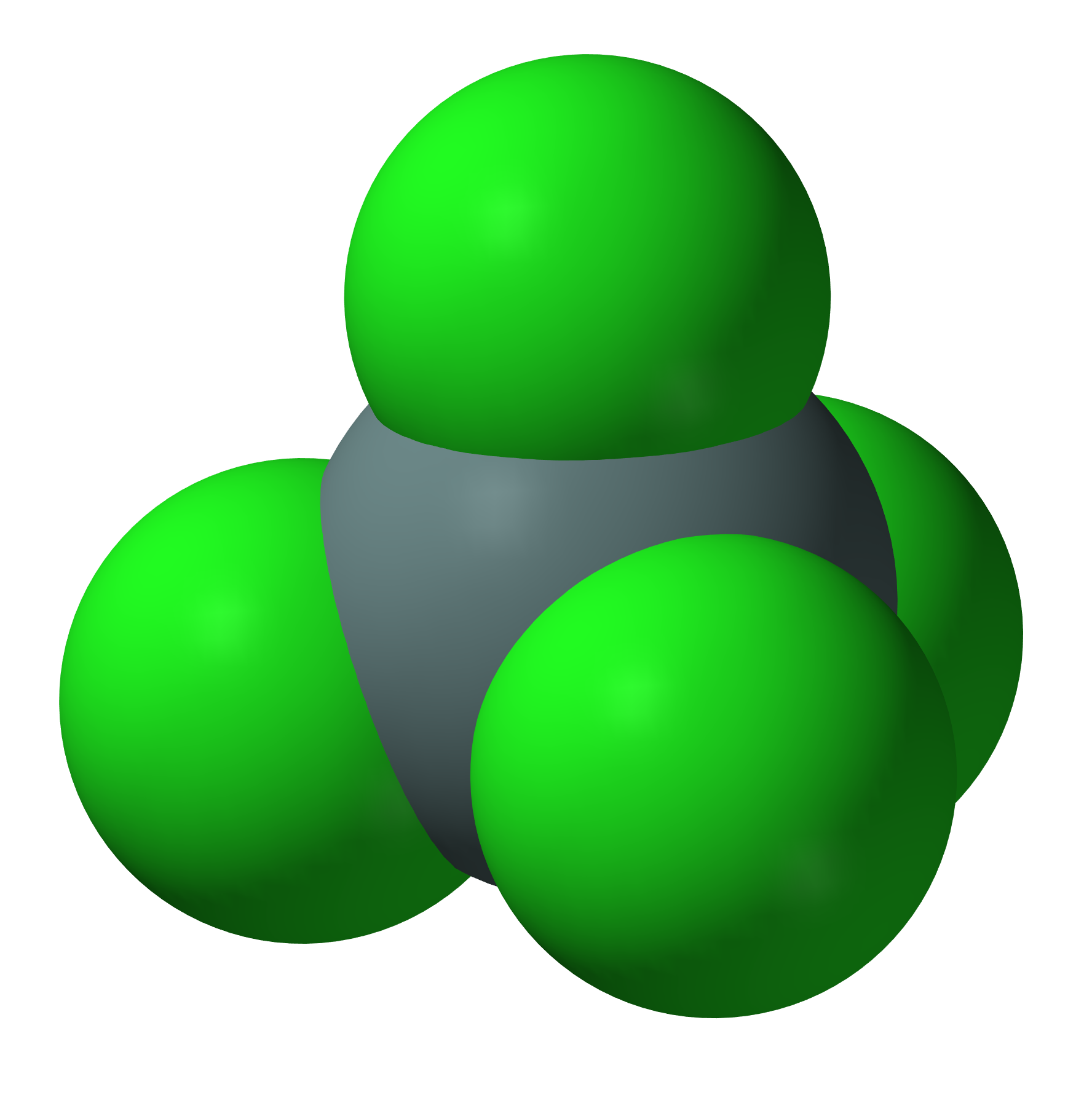
Space-filling model of anhydrous SnCl_{4}.

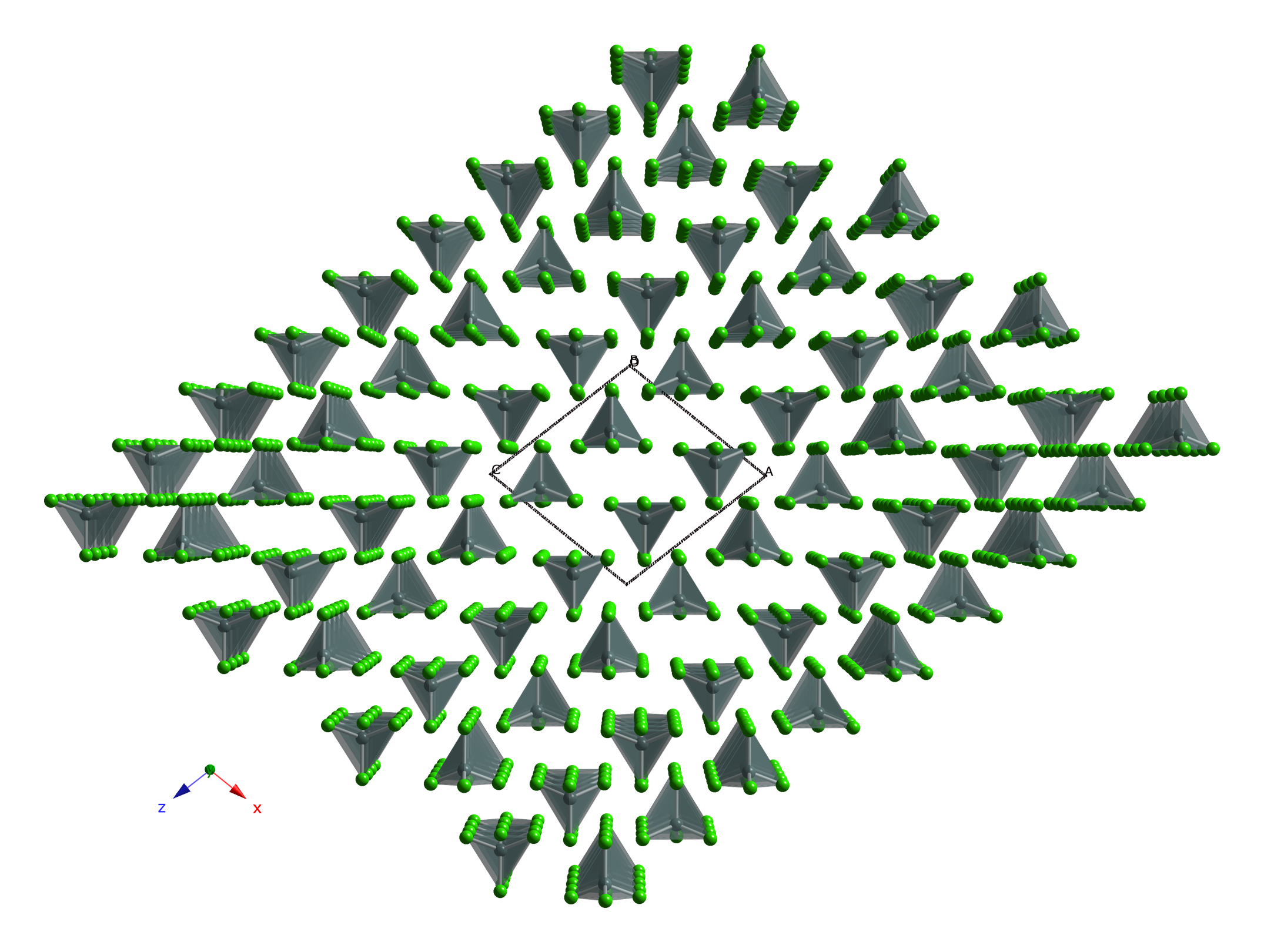
Structure of solid SnCl_{4}.

Anhydrous tin(IV) chloride solidifies at −33 °C (−27 °F) to give monoclinic crystals with the P2_{1}/c space group. It is isostructural with SnBr_{4}. The molecules adopt near-perfect tetrahedral symmetry with average Sn–Cl distances of 227.9(3) pm.

== Reactions ==
Tin(IV) chloride is well known as a Lewis acid. Thus it forms hydrates. The pentahydrate SnCl_{4}·5H_{2}O was formerly known as butter of tin. These hydrates consist of cis-[SnCl_{4}(H_{2}O)_{2}] molecules together with varying amounts of water of crystallization. The additional water molecules link together the molecules of [SnCl_{4}(H_{2}O)_{2}] through hydrogen bonds. A pentahydrate has also been crystallized. In cis-SnCl_{4}(H_{2}O)_{2}·3H_{2}O, the Sn-Cl bonds are 238.3 pm. Although the pentahydrate is the most common hydrate, lower hydrates have also been characterised.

Aside from water, other Lewis bases form adducts with SnCl_{4}. These include ammonia and organophosphines.

The ammonium salt of [SnCl_{6}]^{2−} is formed from ammonium chloride. It is called "pink salt":

SnCl_{4} + 2 (NH_{4})Cl → (NH_{4})_{2}SnCl_{6}

The analogous reaction with hydrochloric acid gives "hexachlorostannic acid".

Reaction of the tetrachloride with hydrogen fluoride gives tin tetrafluoride:

SnCl_{4} + 4 HF → SnF_{4} + 4 HCl

Tin(IV) chloride undergoes redistribution with tin(IV) bromide as assessed by ^{119}Sn NMR and Raman spectroscopy. Equilibrium is achieved in seconds at room temperature. By contrast, halide exchange for related germanium and especially silicon halides is slower.

== Applications ==
=== Precursor to organotin compounds ===
Anhydrous tin(IV) chloride is a major precursor in organotin chemistry. Upon treatment with Grignard reagents, tin(IV) chloride gives tetraalkyltin compounds:

SnCl_{4} + 4 RMgCl → SnR_{4} + 4 MgCl_{2}

Anhydrous tin(IV) chloride reacts with tetraorganotin compounds in redistribution reactions:

SnCl_{4} + SnR_{4} → 2 SnCl_{2}R_{2}

These organotin halides are useful precursors to catalysts (e.g., dibutyltin dilaurate) and polymer stabilizers.

=== Organic synthesis ===
SnCl_{4} is used in Friedel–Crafts reactions as a Lewis acid catalyst. For example, the acetylation of thiophene to give 2-acetylthiophene is promoted by tin(IV) chloride. Similarly, tin(IV) chloride is useful for nitrations.

== Safety ==
Stannic chloride was used as a chemical weapon in World War I, as it formed an irritating (but non-deadly) dense smoke on contact with air. It was supplanted by a mixture of silicon tetrachloride and titanium tetrachloride near the end of the war due to shortages of tin.
