= Tin(II) iodide =

- Sn^{2+} (I^{−})_{2}

Names
- IUPAC name tin(II) iodide
- Other names stannous iodide

Identifiers
CAS Number	10294-70-9
3D model (JSmol)	Interactive image
ChemSpider	23483
ECHA InfoCard	100.030.594
EC Number	233-667-3
PubChem CID	9951390
UNII	OSH64454WG
CompTox Dashboard (EPA)	DTXSID40904018
- InChI: InChI=1S/2HI.Sn/h2*1H;/q;;+2/p-2 Key: JTDNNCYXCFHBGG-UHFFFAOYSA-L; InChI=1/2HI.Sn/h2*1H;/q;;+2/p-2 Key: JTDNNCYXCFHBGG-NUQVWONBAK
- SMILES: [Sn](I)I

Properties
Chemical formula	I_{2}Sn
Molar mass	372.519 g·mol^{−1}
Appearance	red to red-orange solid
Density	5.28 g/cm^{3}
Melting point	320 °C (608 °F; 593 K)
Boiling point	714 °C (1,317 °F; 987 K)
Solubility in water	0.98 g/100 g

Related compounds
Other anions	tin dichloride, tin(II) bromide
Other cations	lead(II) iodide
Related compounds	tin tetraiodide
- Except where otherwise noted, data are given for materials in their standard state (at 25 °C [77 °F], 100 kPa). verify (what is ?) Infobox references

Tin(II) iodide, also known as stannous iodide, is the inorganic compound with the formula SnI_{2}. It is a red-orange solid. It reacts with iodine to give tin(IV) iodide.

Tin(II) iodide can be synthesised by heating metallic tin with a mixture iodine in 2 M hydrochloric acid.

Sn + I_{2} → SnI_{2}

== Structure ==
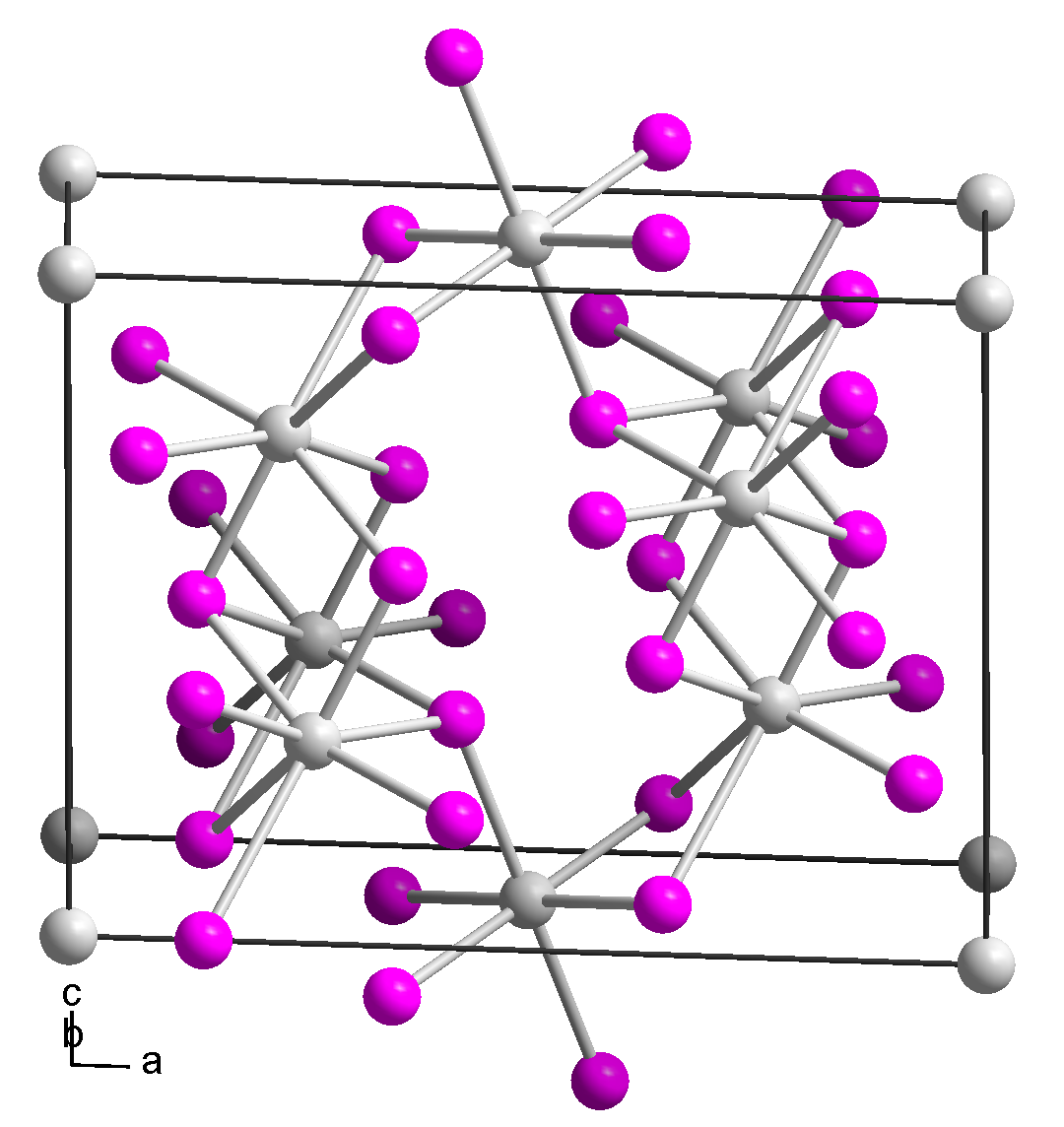
Structure of solid SnI2. Color code: violet = I, gray = Sn.

It crystallizes in a unique motif. According to X-ray crystallography, some Sn(II) centers are bound to six iodide ligands others Sn(II) sites are distorted.
