= Tin(IV) bromide =

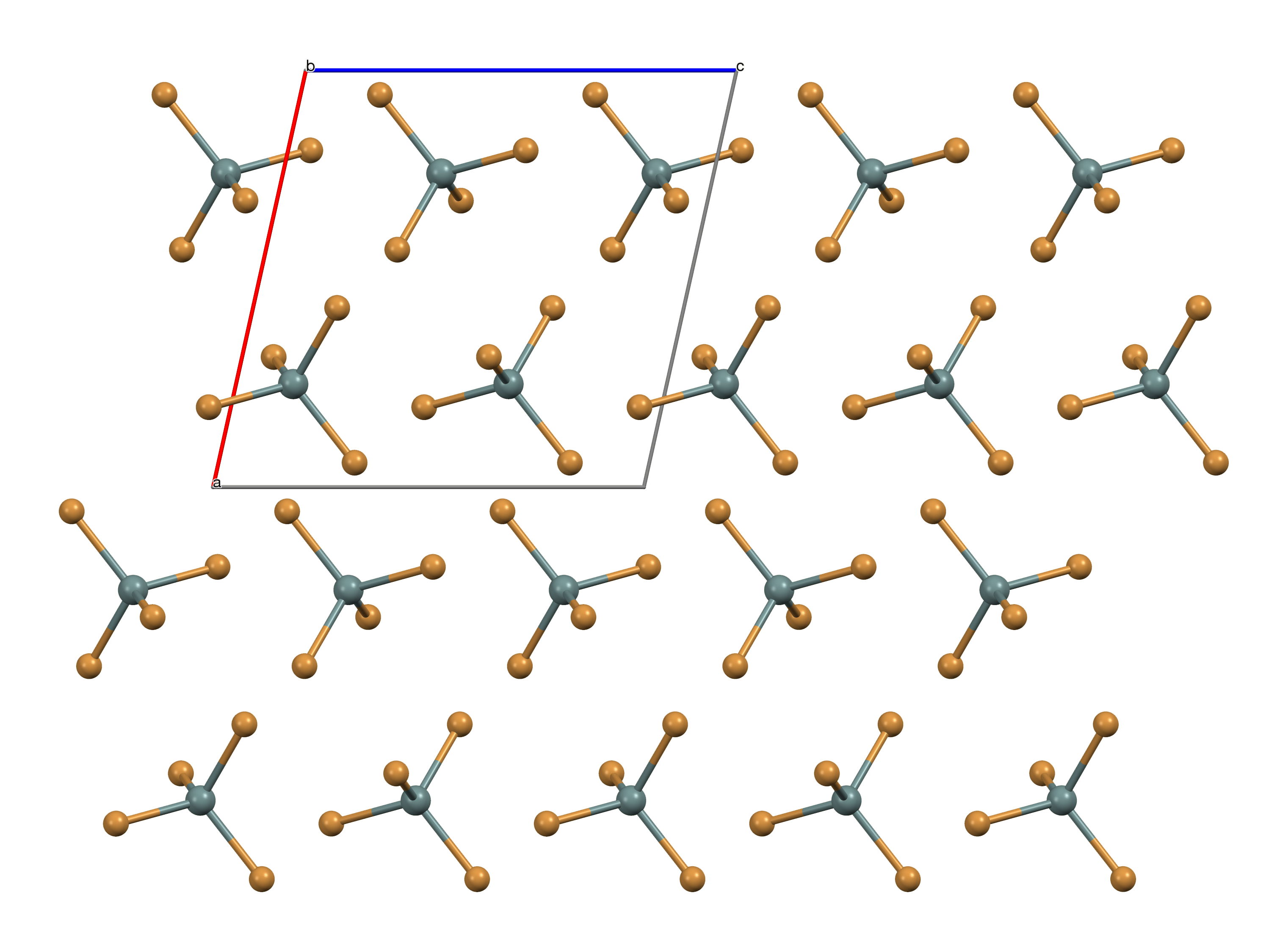

Names
- IUPAC name tetrabromostannane
- Other names tin tetrabromide, stannic bromide, bromostannic acid

Identifiers
CAS Number	7789-67-5
3D model (JSmol)	Interactive image
ChemSpider	23018
ECHA InfoCard	100.029.258
EC Number	232-184-5
PubChem CID	24616
UNII	23C21BW281
CompTox Dashboard (EPA)	DTXSID1064873
- InChI: InChI=1S/4BrH.Sn/h4*1H;/q;;;;+4/p-4 Key: LTSUHJWLSNQKIP-UHFFFAOYSA-J; InChI=1/4BrH.Sn/h4*1H;/q;;;;+4/p-4 Key: LTSUHJWLSNQKIP-XBHQNQODAB
- SMILES: Br[Sn](Br)(Br)Br

Properties
Chemical formula	SnBr_{4}
Molar mass	438.33 g/mol
Appearance	colourless
Density	3.340 g/cm^{3} (at 35 °C)
Melting point	31 °C (88 °F; 304 K)
Boiling point	205 °C (401 °F; 478 K)
Solubility in water	soluble
Magnetic susceptibility (χ)	−149.0·10^{−6} cm^{3}/mol

Hazards
- GHS labelling
Pictograms	(GHS05: Corrosive) (GHS07: Exclamation mark)
Signal word	Danger
Hazard statements	H314, H335
Precautionary statements	P260, P264, P271, P280, P301+P330+P331, P302+P361+P354, P304+P340, P305+P354+P338, P316, P319, P321, P363, P403+P233, P405, P501

Related compounds
Other anions	Tin(IV) fluoride Tin(IV) chloride Tin(IV) iodide
Other cations	Carbon tetrabromide Silicon tetrabromide Germanium tetrabromide
Related compounds	Tin(II) bromide
- Except where otherwise noted, data are given for materials in their standard state (at 25 °C [77 °F], 100 kPa). verify (what is ?) Infobox references

Tin(IV) bromide is the chemical compound SnBr_{4}. It is a colourless low melting solid.

== Structure ==
SnBr_{4} crystallises in a monoclinic crystal system with molecular SnBr_{4} units that have distorted tetrahedral geometry. The mean Sn-Br bond length is 242.3 pm.

== Preparation ==
SnBr_{4} can be prepared by reaction of the elements at standard temperature and pressure (STP):

Sn + 2Br_{2} → SnBr_{4}

== Reactions ==
In aqueous solution SnBr_{4} dissolves to give a series of octahedral (six-ligated) bromo-aquo complexes. These include SnBr_{4}(H_{2}O)_{2} and cis- and trans-[SnBr_{2}(H_{2}O)_{4}]^{2+}.

SnBr_{4} forms 1:1 and 1:2 complexes with ligands. With trimethylphosphine both SnBr_{4}·P(CH_{3})_{3} and SnBr_{4}·2P(CH_{3})_{3}.

Tin(IV) bromide undergoes redistribution with tin(IV) chloride as assessed by ^{119}Sn NMR and Raman spectroscopy. Equilibrium is achieved in seconds at room temperature. By contrast, halide exchange for related germanium and especially silicon halides is slower.
