= Iridium tetrabromide =

Names
- Other names: Iridium(IV) bromide; Tetrabromoiridium

Identifiers
| CAS Number | 7789-64-2 |
| 3D model (JSmol) | Interactive image |
| ChemSpider | 13905634 |
| ECHA InfoCard | 100.029.255 |
| EC Number | 232-180-3 |
| PubChem CID | 14029372 |
| CompTox Dashboard (EPA) | DTXSID70999078 |
- InChI: InChI=1S/4BrH.Ir/h4*1H;/q;;;;+4/p-4 Key: IYWTUWKWQJIZPO-UHFFFAOYSA-J
- SMILES: Br[Ir](Br)(Br)Br

Properties
| Chemical formula | Br_{4}Ir |
| Molar mass | 511.833 g·mol^{−1} |
| Appearance | black crystalline solid |
| Solubility in water | soluble |
| Solubility | alcohol |

Related compounds
| Related compounds | Osmium tetrabromide |

Hazards
- GHS labelling
| Pictograms | (GHS07: Exclamation mark) |
| Signal word | Warning |
| Hazard statements | H315, H319, H335 |
| Precautionary statements | P261, P264, P264+P265, P271, P280, P302+P352, P304+P340, P305+P351+P338, P319, P321, P332+P317, P337+P317, P362+P364, P403+P233, P405, P501 |
- Except where otherwise noted, data are given for materials in their standard state (at 25 °C [77 °F], 100 kPa). Infobox references

Iridium tetrabromide is a binary inorganic compound of iridium and bromine with the chemical formula IrBr_{4}. It is a deliquescent black solid.

== Synthesis ==
Iridium tetrabromide can be prepared by reacting iridium(IV) oxide with hydrobromic acid:

IrO_{2} + 4HBr → IrBr_{4} + 2H_{2}O

== Chemical properties ==
Iridium tetrabromide reacts with water:

IrBr_{4} + 4H_{2}O → Ir(OH)_{4} + 4HBr

Iridium tetrabromide decomposes when heated:

IrBr_{4} → Ir + 2Br_{2}
