= Silicon tetrabromide =

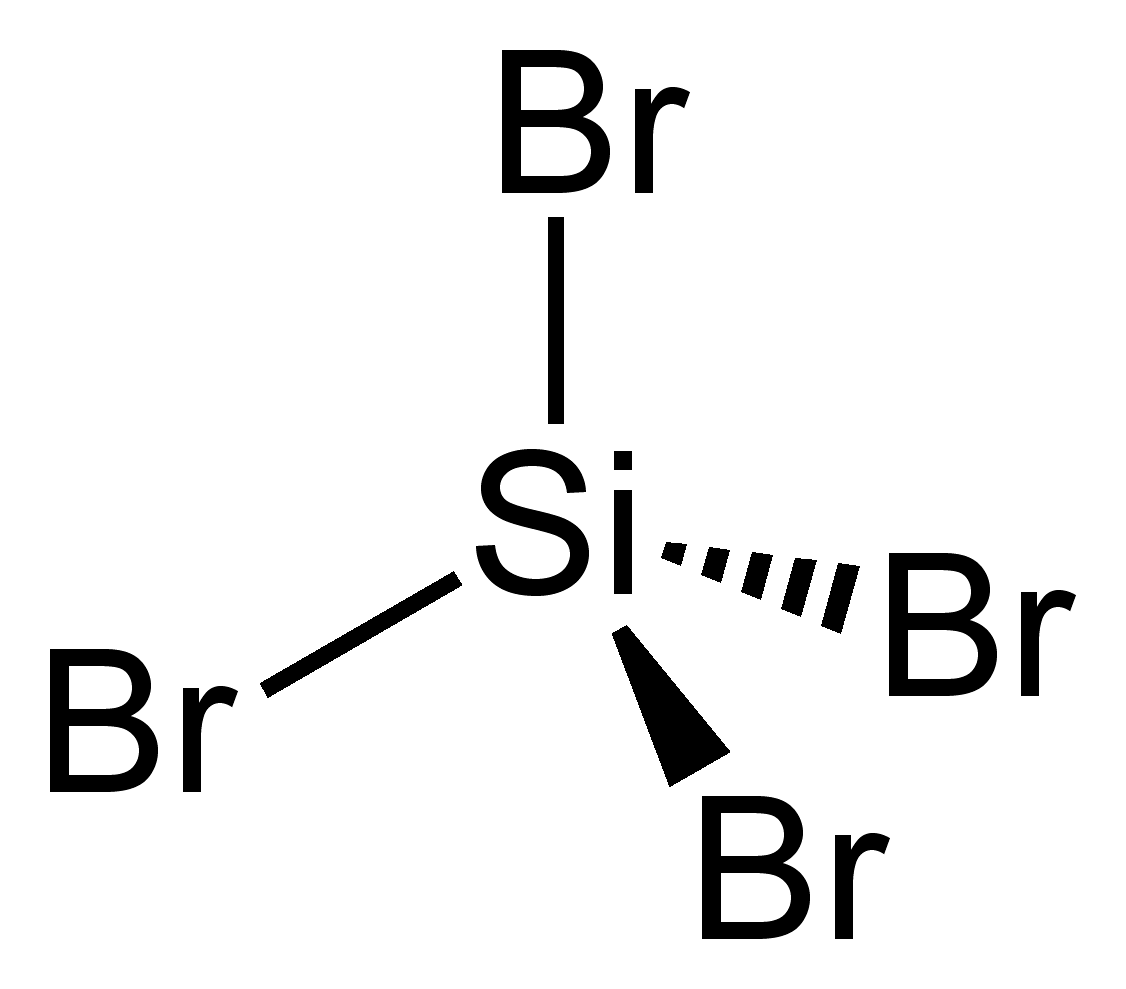
Stereo structural formula of silicon tetrabromide
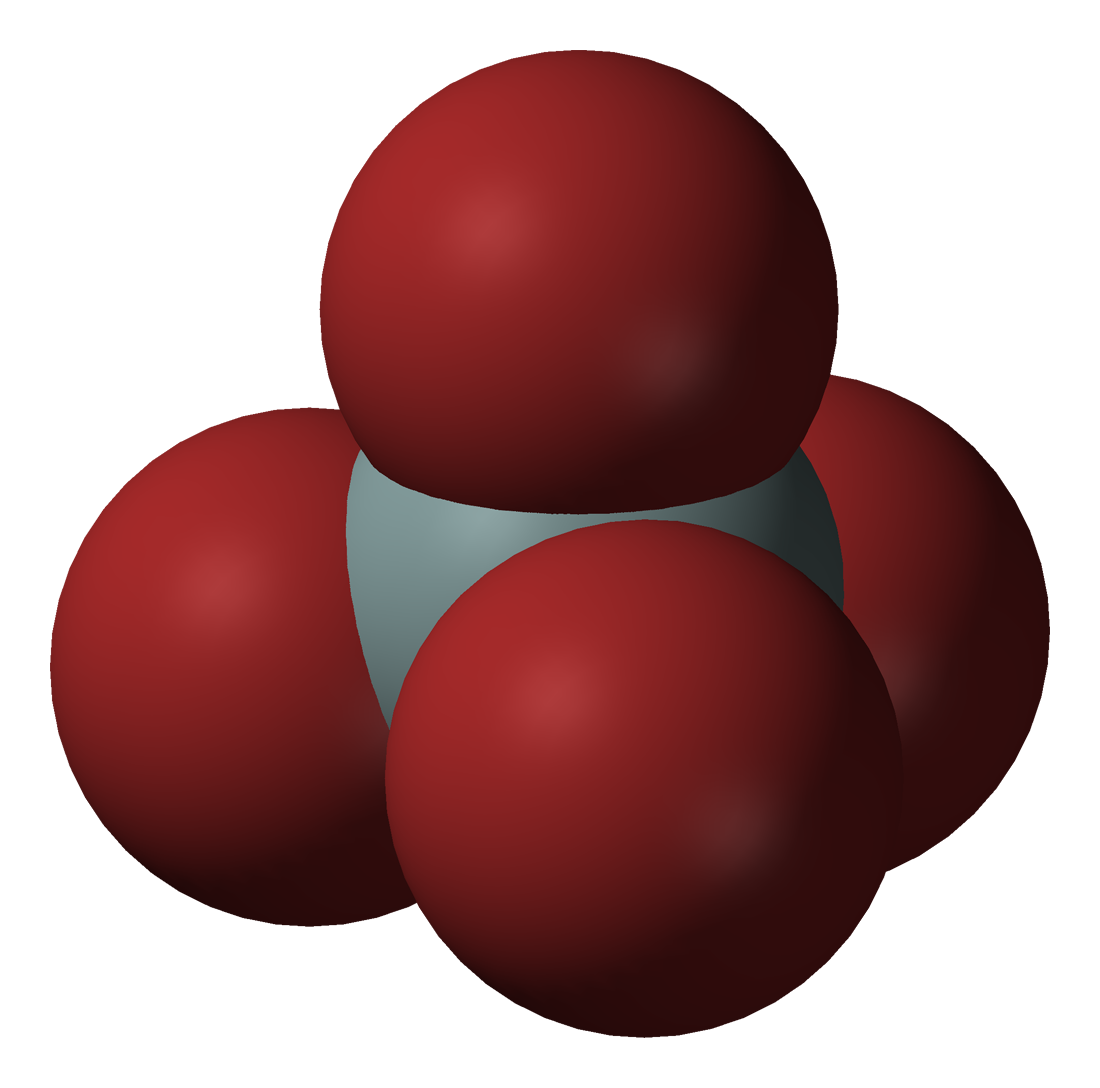
Space fill model of silicon tetrabromide
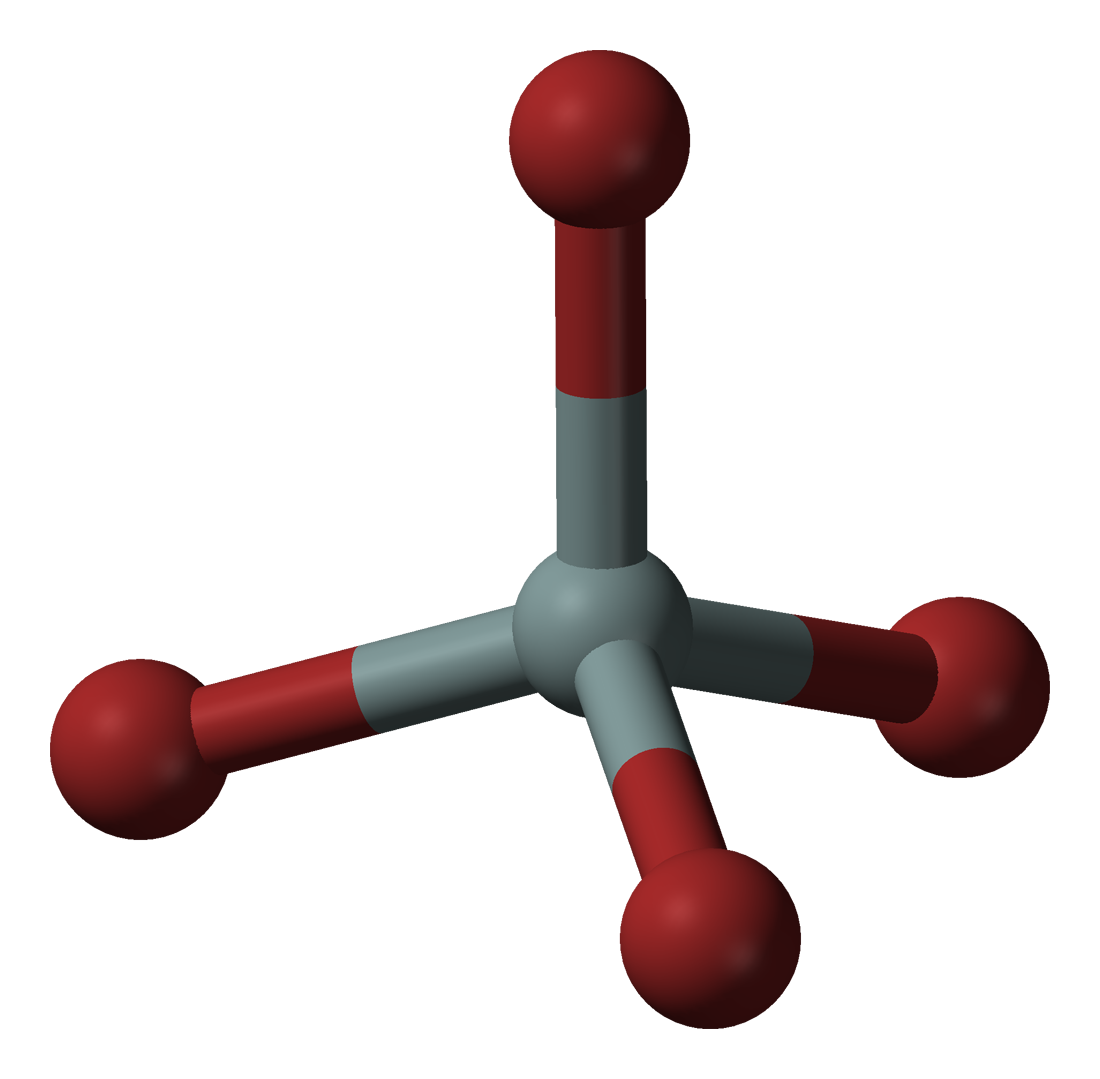
- Ball and stick model of silicon tetrabromide

Names
- IUPAC name Silicon tetrabromide
- Other names Silicon bromide Silicon(IV) bromide

Identifiers
CAS Number	7789-66-4
3D model (JSmol)	Interactive image
ChemSpider	74225
ECHA InfoCard	100.029.257
EC Number	232-182-4
PubChem CID	82247
UNII	8GAC9YWL42
UN number	3264
CompTox Dashboard (EPA)	DTXSID6064872
- InChI: InChI=1S/Br4Si/c1-5(2,3)4 Key: AIFMYMZGQVTROK-UHFFFAOYSA-N
- SMILES: Br[Si](Br)(Br)Br

Properties
Chemical formula	Br_{4}Si
Molar mass	347.701 g·mol^{−1}
Appearance	Colorless liquid
Density	2.79 g·cm^{−3}
Melting point	5 °C (41 °F; 278 K)
Boiling point	153 °C (307 °F; 426 K)
Magnetic susceptibility (χ)	−128.6·10^{−6} cm^{3}/mol
Refractive index (n_{D})	1.5685

Hazards
- GHS labelling
Pictograms	(GHS05: Corrosive) (GHS07: Exclamation mark)
Signal word	Danger
Hazard statements	H302, H312, H314, H332, H335
Precautionary statements	P260, P264, P270, P271, P280, P301+P312, P301+P330+P331, P302+P352, P303+P361+P353, P304+P312, P304+P340, P305+P351+P338, P310, P312, P321, P322, P330, P363, P403+P233, P405, P501
NFPA 704 (fire diamond)	3 0 2 W

Related compounds
Related tetrahalosilanes	Silicon tetrachloride Silicon tetrafluoride Silicon tetraiodide
Related compounds	Platinum(IV) bromide Tellurium tetrabromide Tetrabromomethane; Tin(IV) bromide Titanium tetrabromide Zirconium(IV) bromide
- Except where otherwise noted, data are given for materials in their standard state (at 25 °C [77 °F], 100 kPa). Infobox references

Silicon tetrabromide, also known as tetrabromosilane, is the inorganic compound with the formula SiBr_{4}. This colorless liquid has a suffocating odor due to its tendency to hydrolyze with release of hydrogen bromide. The general properties of silicon tetrabromide closely resemble those of the more commonly used silicon tetrachloride.

== Comparison of SiX_{4} ==
The properties of the tetrasilanes, all of which are tetrahedral, are significantly affected by nature of the halide. These trends apply also to the mixed halides. Melting points, boiling points, and bond lengths increase with the atomic mass of the halide. The opposite trend is observed for the Si-X bond energies.

	SiH_{4}	SiF_{4}	SiCl_{4}	SiBr_{4}	SiI_{4}
b.p. (˚C)	−111.9	−90.3	56.8	155.0	290.0
m.p. (˚C)	−185	−95.0	−68.8	5.0	155.0
Si-X bond length (Å)		1.55	2.02	2.20	2.43
Si-X bond energy (kJ/mol)	384	582	391	310	234

== Lewis acidity ==
Covalently saturated silicon complexes like SiBr_{4}, along with tetrahalides of germanium (Ge) and tin (Sn), are Lewis acids. Although silicon tetrahalides obey the octet rule, they add Lewis basic ligands to give adducts with the formula SiBr_{4}L and SiBr_{4}L_{2} (where L is a Lewis base). The Lewis acidic properties of the tetrahalides tend to increase as follows: SiI_{4} < SiBr_{4} < SiCl_{4} < SiF_{4}. This trend is attributed to the relative electronegativities of the halogens.

The strength of the Si-X bonds decrease in the order: Si-F > Si-Cl > Si-Br > Si-I.

== Synthesis ==
Silicon tetrabromide is synthesized by the reaction of silicon with hydrogen bromide at 600 °C.

Si + 4 HBr → SiBr_{4} + 2 H_{2}

Side products include dibromosilane (SiH_{2}Br_{2}) and tribromosilane (SiHBr_{3}).

Si + 2 HBr → SiH_{2}Br_{2}
Si + 3 HBr → SiHBr_{3} + H_{2}

It can also be produced by treating silicon-copper mixture with bromine:

Si + Br_{2} → SiBr_{4}

== Reactivity ==
Like other halosilanes, SiBr_{4} can be converted to hydrides, alkoxides, amides, and alkyls, i.e., products with the following functional groups: Si-H, Si-OR, Si-NR_{2}, Si-R, and Si-X bonds respectively.

Silicon tetrabromide can be readily reduced by hydrides or complex hydrides.

4 R_{2}AlH + SiBr_{4} → SiH_{4} + 4 R_{2}AlBr

Reactions with alcohols and amines proceed as follows:

SiBr_{4} + 4 ROH → Si(OR)_{4} + 4 HBr

SiBr_{4} + 8 HNR_{2} → Si(NR_{2})_{4} + 4 HNR_{2}HBr

Grignard reactions with metal alkyl halides are particularly important reactions due to their production of organosilicon compounds which can be converted to silicones.

SiBr_{4} + n RMgX → R_{n}SiBr_{4−n} + n MgXBr

Redistribution reactions occur between two different silicon tetrahalides (as well as halogenated polysilanes) when heated to 100 ˚C, resulting in various mixed halosilanes. The melting points and boiling points of these mixed halosilanes generally increase as their molecular weights increase. (Can occur with X= H, F, Cl, Br, and I)

2 SiBr_{4} + 2 SiCl_{4} → SiBr_{3}Cl + 2 SiBr_{2}Cl_{2} + SiBrCl_{3}
Si_{2}Cl_{6} + Si_{2}Br_{6} → Si_{2}Cl_{n}Br_{6−n}

Silicon tetrabromide hydrolyzes readily when exposed to air causing it to fume:

SiBr_{4} + 2 H_{2}O → SiO_{2} + 4 HBr

Silicon tetrabromide is stable in the presence of oxygen at room temperature, but bromosiloxanes form at 670–695 ˚C .

2 SiBr_{4} + 1/2 O_{2} → Br_{3}SiOSiBr_{3} + Br_{2}

== Uses ==
Due to its close similarity to silicon tetrachloride, there are few applications unique to SiBr_{4}. The pyrolysis of SiBr_{4} does have the advantage of depositing silicon at faster rates than that of SiCl_{4}, however SiCl_{4} is usually preferred due to its availability in high purity. Pyrolysis of SiBr_{4} followed by treatment with ammonia yields silicon nitride (Si_{3}N_{4}) coatings, a hard compound used for ceramics, sealants, and the production of many cutting tools.
