= Tin(IV) iodide =

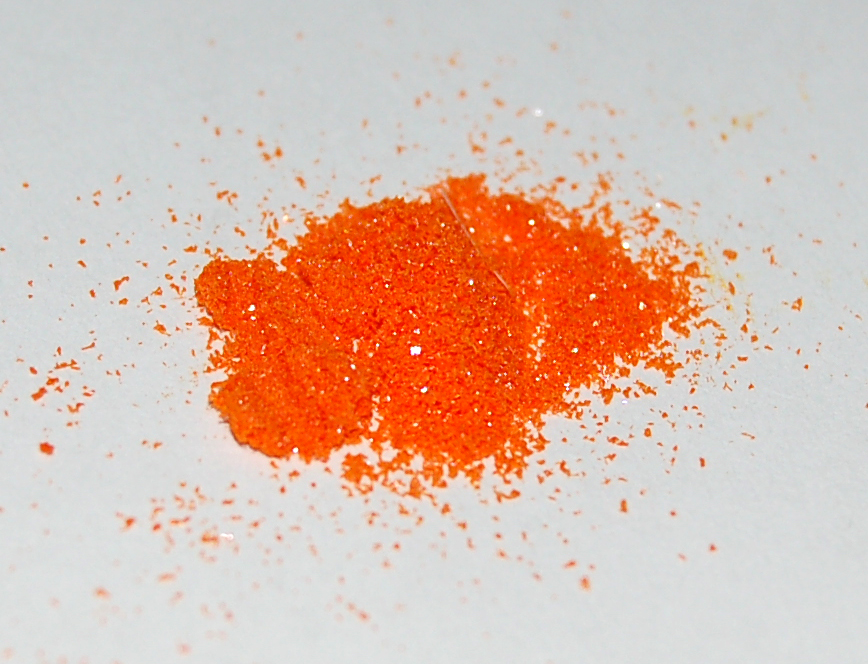
Photograph of a sample of tin tetraiodide
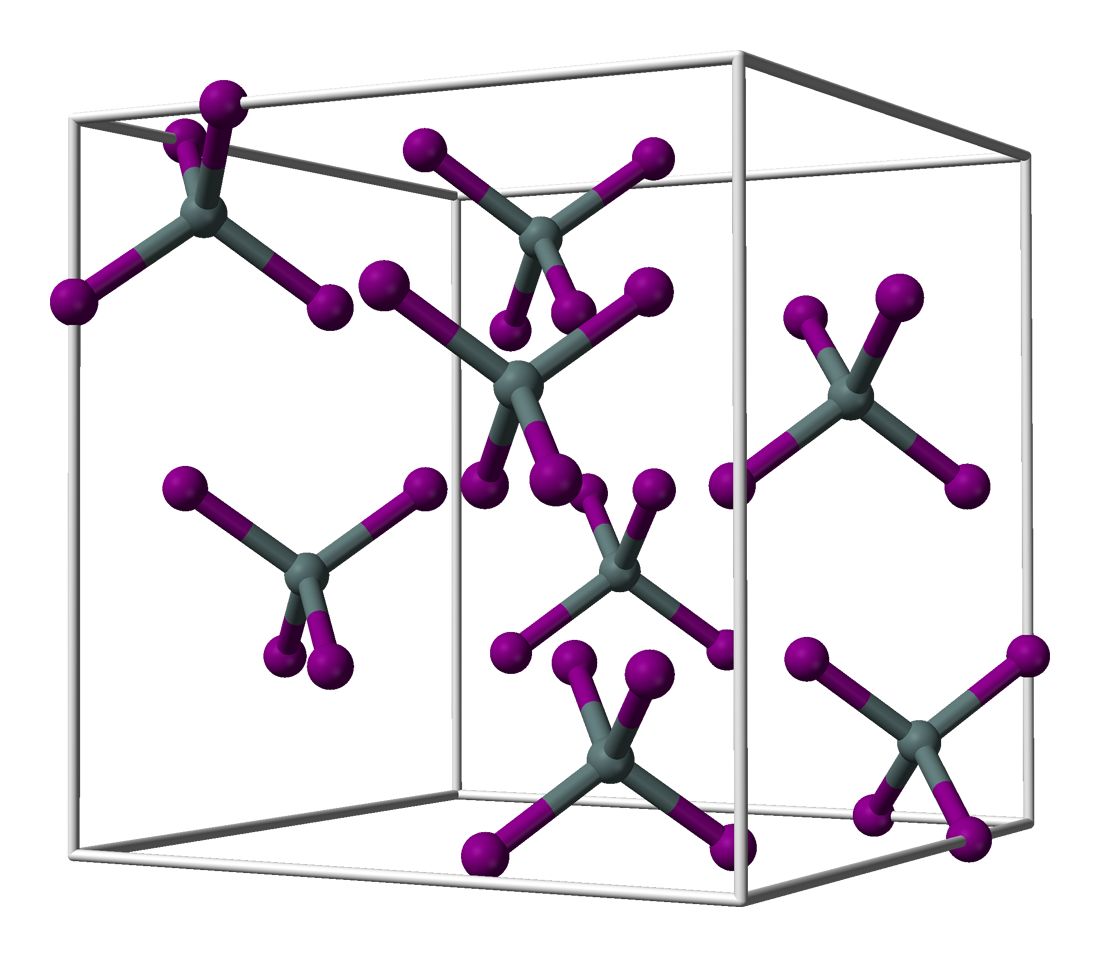
Ball-and-stick model of the unit cell of tin tetraiodide
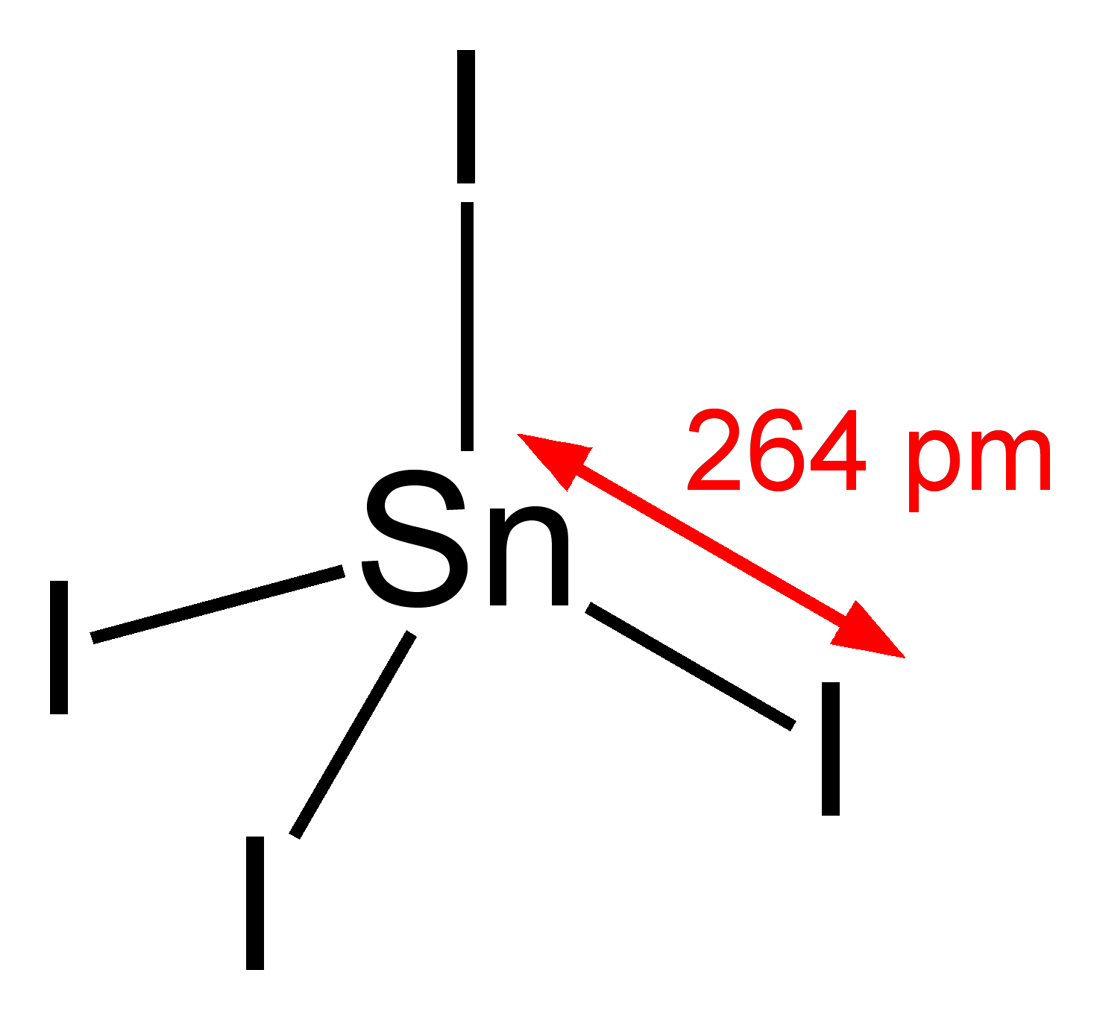
Structure and dimensions of the tin(IV) iodide molecule
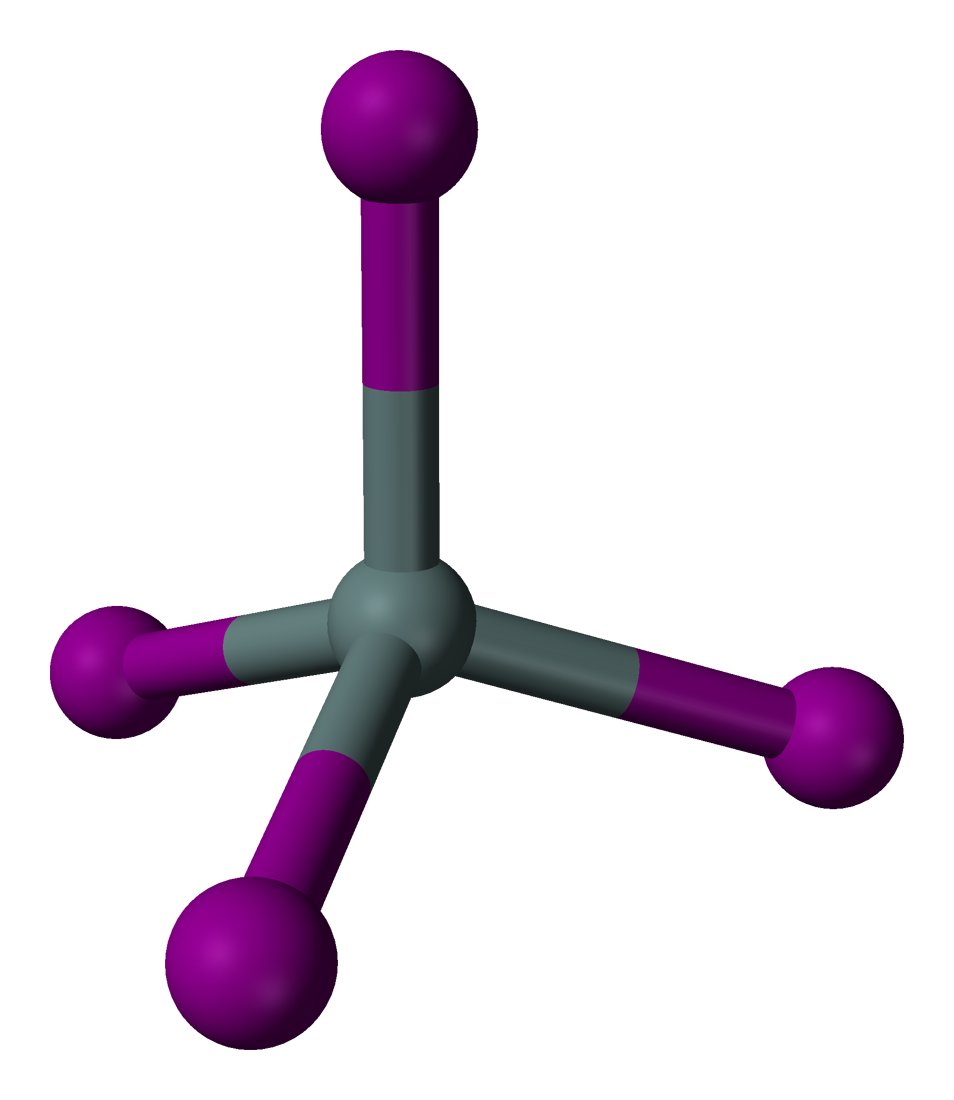
Ball-and-stick model of the tin(IV) iodide molecule

Names
- IUPAC name tin(IV) iodide
- Other names: Tin tetraiodide; Stannic iodide

Identifiers
CAS Number	7790-47-8
3D model (JSmol)	Interactive image
ChemSpider	23033
ECHA InfoCard	100.029.281
EC Number	232-208-4
PubChem CID	11490544
UNII	8H688BW69X
CompTox Dashboard (EPA)	DTXSID6064876
- InChI: InChI=1S/4HI.Sn/h4*1H;/q;;;;+4/p-4 Key: QPBYLOWPSRZOFX-UHFFFAOYSA-J; InChI=1/4HI.Sn/h4*1H;/q;;;;+4/p-4 Key: QPBYLOWPSRZOFX-XBHQNQODAO
- SMILES: [Sn](I)(I)(I)I

Properties
Chemical formula	SnI_{4}
Molar mass	626.328 g·mol^{−1}
Appearance	red-orange crystalline solid
Density	4.56 g/cm^{3}
Melting point	143 °C (289 °F; 416 K)
Boiling point	348.5 °C (659.3 °F; 621.6 K)
Refractive index (n_{D})	2.106

Structure
Crystal structure	Cubic, cP40
Space group	Pa-3 No. 205

Hazards
- GHS labelling
Pictograms	(GHS05: Corrosive) (GHS07: Exclamation mark) (GHS08: Health hazard)
Signal word	Danger
Hazard statements	H302, H312, H314, H317, H332, H334
Precautionary statements	P233, P260, P264, P270, P271, P272, P280, P284, P301+P317, P301+P330+P331, P302+P352, P302+P361+P354, P304+P340, P305+P354+P338, P316, P317, P321, P330, P333+P317, P342+P316, P362+P364, P363, P403, P405, P501

Related compounds
Other anions	Tin(IV) fluoride; Tin(IV) chloride; Tin(IV) bromide
Other cations	Carbon tetraiodide; Silicon tetraiodide; Germanium tetraiodide; Titanium tetraiodide
Related compounds	Tin(II) iodide
- Except where otherwise noted, data are given for materials in their standard state (at 25 °C [77 °F], 100 kPa). verify (what is ?) Infobox references

Tin(IV) iodide, also known as stannic iodide, is the chemical compound with the formula SnI_{4}. This tetrahedral molecule crystallizes as a bright orange solid that dissolves readily in nonpolar solvents such as benzene.

== Preparation ==
The compound is usually prepared by the reaction of tin and iodine:

Sn + 2 I_{2} → SnI_{4}

== Chemical properties ==
The compound hydrolyses in water. In hydroiodic acid, it reacts to form a rare example of a hexaiodometallate (here hexaiodostannate(IV)):

SnI_{4} + 2 I^{−} → [SnI_{6}]^{2−}

== Physical properties ==
Tin(IV) iodide is an orange solid under standard conditions. It has a cubic crystal structure with the space group Pa3̅ (space group no. 205), the lattice parameter a = 1226 pm and eight formula units per unit cell. This corresponds approximately to a cubic close packing of iodine atoms in which 1/8 of all tetrahedral gaps are occupied by tin atoms. This leads to discrete tetrahedral SnI_{4} molecules.

== See also ==
- Tin(II) iodide
- Tin(IV) chloride
