= Lead tetrafluoride =

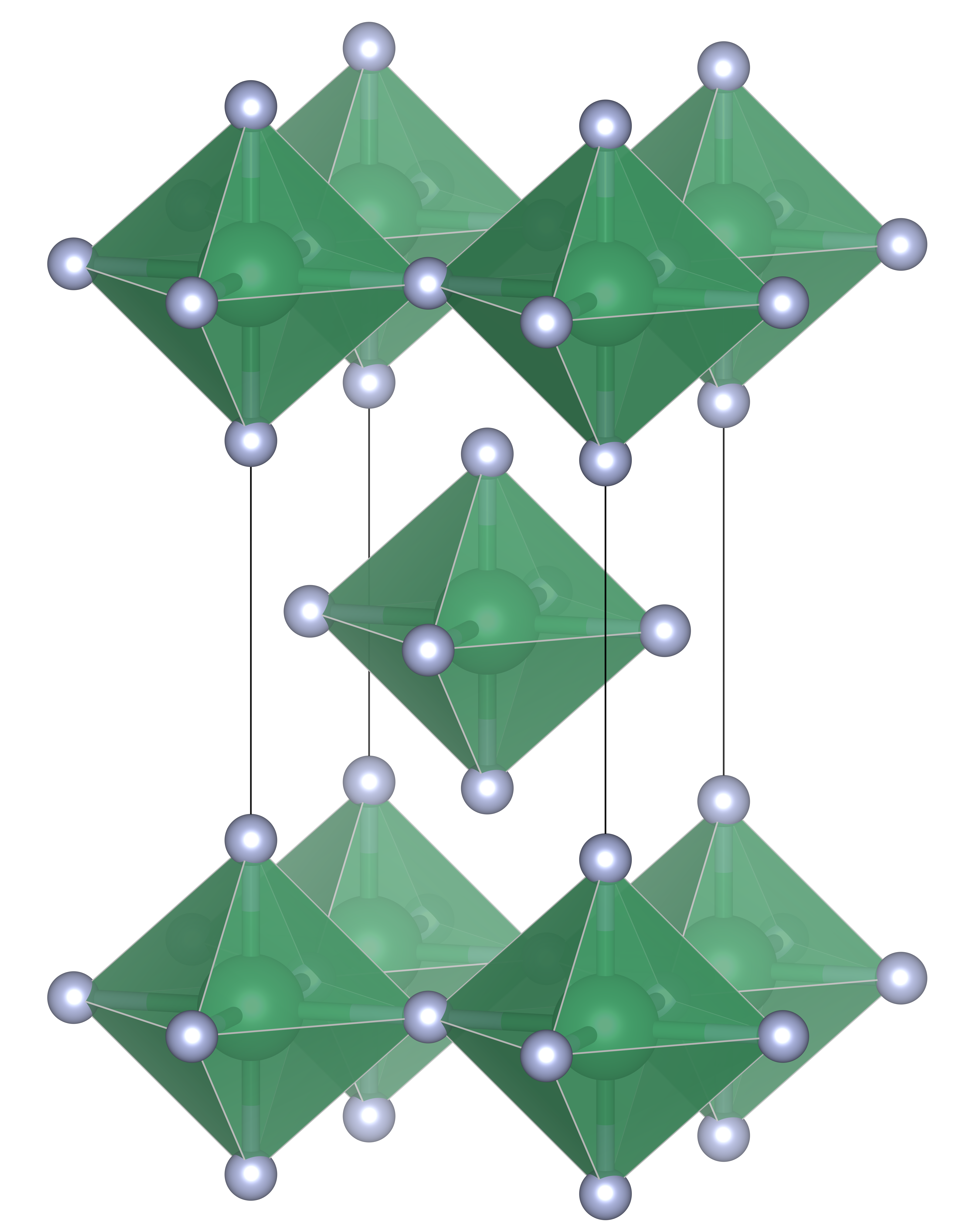
- Unit cell of lead tetrafluoride

Names
- IUPAC name Tetrafluoroplumbane
- Other names Lead(IV) fluoride Lead tetrafluoride Tetrafluoridolead; Tetrafluoroplumbous anhydride

Identifiers
CAS Number	7783-59-7
3D model (JSmol)	Interactive image
ChemSpider	109871
ECHA InfoCard	100.029.102
EC Number	232-012-9
PubChem CID	123258
UNII	5391K3G9PJ
CompTox Dashboard (EPA)	DTXSID40999040
- InChI: InChI=1S/4FH.Pb/h4*1H;/q;;;;+4/p-4 Key: YAFKGUAJYKXPDI-UHFFFAOYSA-J
- SMILES: F[Pb](F)(F)F

Properties
Chemical formula	PbF_{4}
Molar mass	283.194 g/mol
Appearance	white to beige crystals
Density	6.7 g/cm^{3}
Melting point	600 °C (1,112 °F; 873 K)
- Except where otherwise noted, data are given for materials in their standard state (at 25 °C [77 °F], 100 kPa). Infobox references

Lead tetrafluoride is a compound of lead and fluorine. The yellow solid (melting point 600 °C) is the only room-temperature stable tetrahalide of lead. Lead tetrafluoride is isostructural with tin(IV) fluoride and contains planar layers of octahedrally coordinated lead, where the octahedra share four corners and there are two terminal, unshared, fluorine atoms trans to one another.
