= Germanium difluoride =

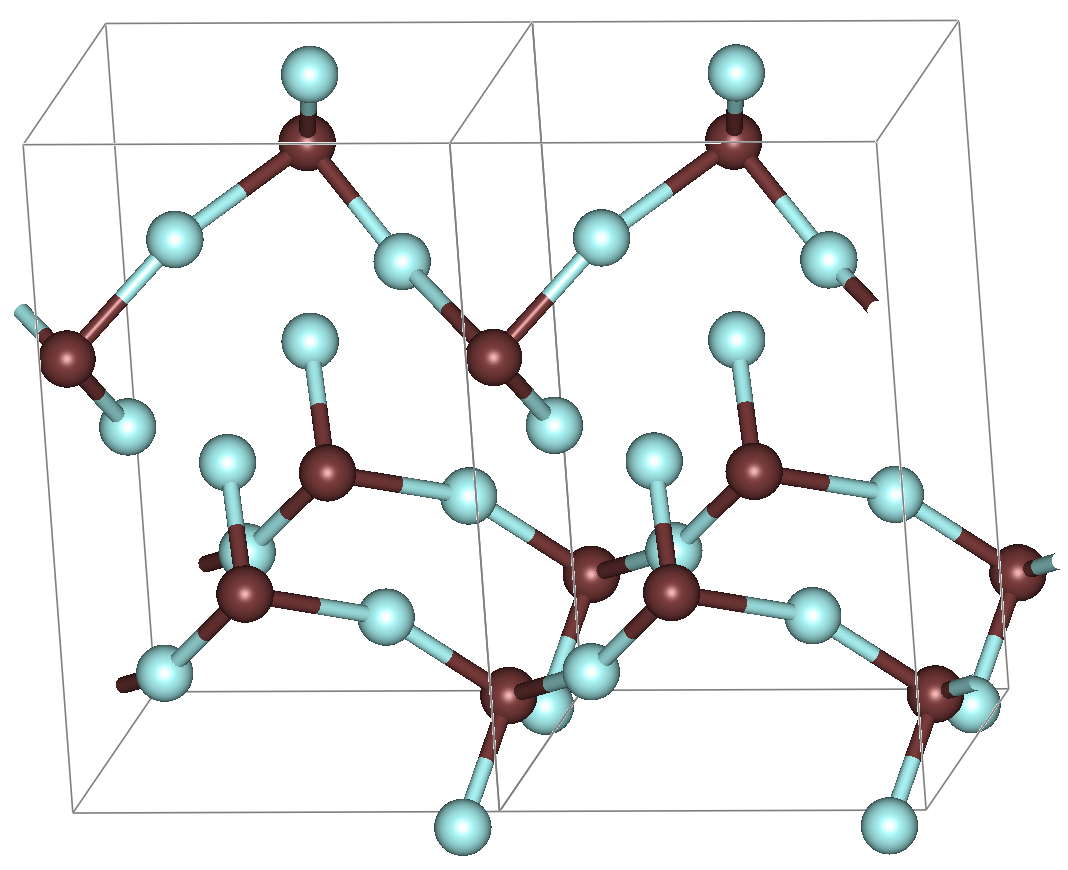
- Two unit cells of the orthorhombic GeF_{2} structure. Brown atoms are germanium and cyan atoms are fluorine

Names
- IUPAC names Germanium difluoride Difluorogermylidene; Difluoridogermanium
- Other names Germanium(II) fluoride

Identifiers
CAS Number	13940-63-1
3D model (JSmol)	Interactive image
ChemSpider	4885763
PubChem CID	6327235
CompTox Dashboard (EPA)	DTXSID30930462
- InChI: InChI=1S/F2Ge/c1-3-2 Key: GGJOARIBACGTDV-UHFFFAOYSA-N
- SMILES: F[Ge]F

Properties
Chemical formula	GeF_{2}
Molar mass	110.61 g/mol
Appearance	White orthorhombic hygroscopic crystals
Density	3.61 g/cm^{3}
Melting point	110 °C (230 °F; 383 K)
Boiling point	130 °C (266 °F; 403 K) (sublimates)

Hazards
- Occupational safety and health (OHS/OSH)
Main hazards	Reacts with water to form HF, corrosive

Related compounds
Related compounds	Germanium tetrafluoride
- Except where otherwise noted, data are given for materials in their standard state (at 25 °C [77 °F], 100 kPa). Infobox references

Germanium difluoride (GeF_{2}) is a chemical compound of germanium and fluorine. It is a white solid with a melting point of 110 °C, and can be produced by reacting germanium tetrafluoride with germanium powder at 150–300 °C.

== Structure ==
Germanium difluoride forms orthorhombic crystals with a space group P2_{1}2_{1}2_{1} (No. 19), Pearson symbol oP12, and lattice constants a = 0.4682 nm, b = 0.5178 nm, c = 0.8312 nm, Z = 4 (four structure units per unit cell). Its crystal structure is characterized by strong polymeric chains composed by GeF_{3} pyramids. One of the fluorine atom in the pyramid is shared by two neighboring chains, providing a weak link between them. Another, less common crystal form of GeF_{2} has tetragonal symmetry with a space group P4_{1}2_{1}2 (No. 92), Pearson symbol tP12, and lattice constants a = 0.487 nm, b = 0.6963 nm, c = 0.858 nm.
