= Tin(II) bromide =

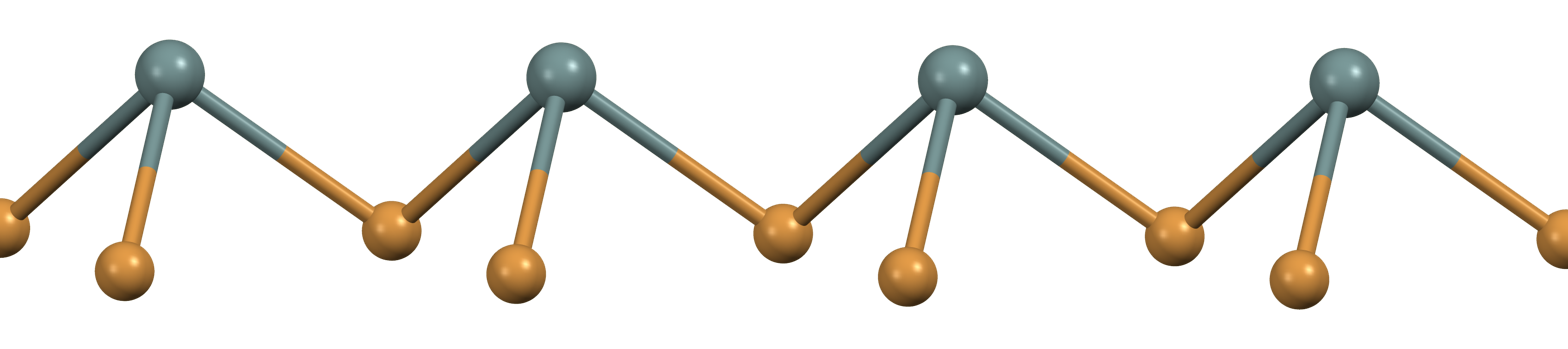
- part of an (SnBr_{2})_{∞} chain in the solid state

Names
- Other names tin dibromide, stannous bromide

Identifiers
CAS Number	10031-24-0
3D model (JSmol)	Interactive image
ChemSpider	59609
ECHA InfoCard	100.030.067
EC Number	233-087-0
PubChem CID	66224
UNII	55F23H2K96
CompTox Dashboard (EPA)	DTXSID501015689 DTXSID70830932, DTXSID501015689
- InChI: InChI=1S/2BrH.Sn/h2*1H;/q;;+2/p-2 Key: ZSUXOVNWDZTCFN-UHFFFAOYSA-L; InChI=1/2BrH.Sn/h2*1H;/q;;+2/p-2 Key: ZSUXOVNWDZTCFN-NUQVWONBAM
- SMILES: Br[Sn]Br

Properties
Chemical formula	SnBr_{2}
Molar mass	278.518 g/mol
Appearance	yellow powder
Density	5.12 g/cm^{3}, solid
Melting point	215 °C (419 °F; 488 K)
Boiling point	639 °C (1,182 °F; 912 K)

Structure
Crystal structure	related to PbCl_{2}

Hazards
- GHS labelling
Pictograms	(GHS05: Corrosive)
Signal word	Danger
Hazard statements	H314
Precautionary statements	P260, P264, P280, P301+P330+P331, P303+P361+P353, P304+P340, P305+P351+P338, P310, P321, P363, P405, P501
- Except where otherwise noted, data are given for materials in their standard state (at 25 °C [77 °F], 100 kPa). verify (what is ?) Infobox references

Tin(II) bromide is a chemical compound of tin and bromine with a chemical formula of SnBr_{2}. Tin is in the +2 oxidation state. The stability of tin compounds in this oxidation state is attributed to the inert pair effect.

== Structure and bonding ==
In the gas phase SnBr_{2} is non-linear with a bent configuration similar to SnCl_{2} in the gas phase. The Br-Sn-Br angle is 95° and the Sn-Br bond length is 255pm. There is evidence of dimerisation in the gaseous phase. The solid state structure is related to that of SnCl_{2} and PbCl_{2} and the tin atoms have five near bromine atom neighbours in an approximately trigonal bipyramidal configuration. Two polymorphs exist: a room-temperature orthorhombic polymorph, and a high-temperature hexagonal polymorph. Both contain (SnBr_{2})_{∞} chains but the packing arrangement differs.

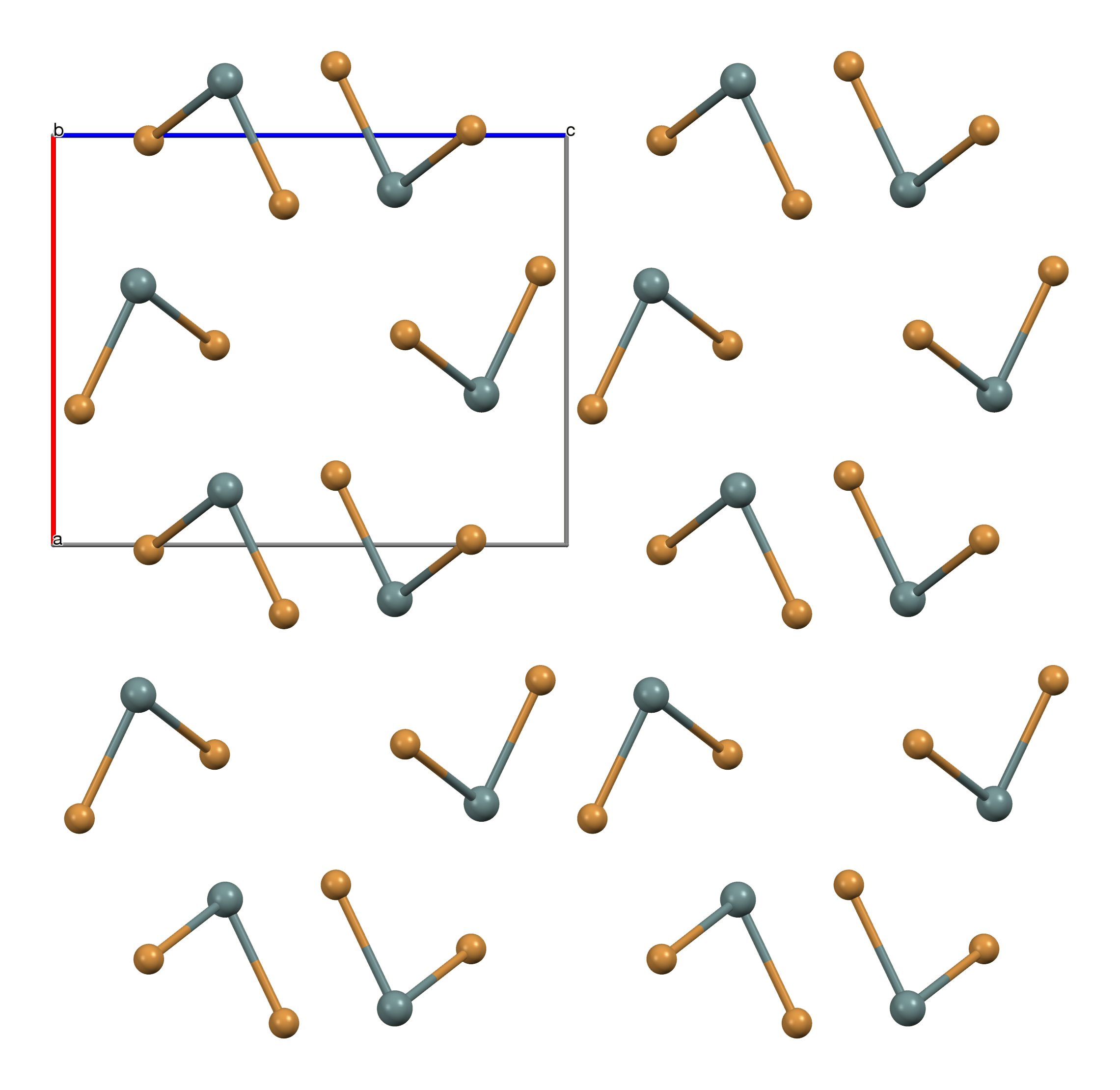
orthorhombic polymorph

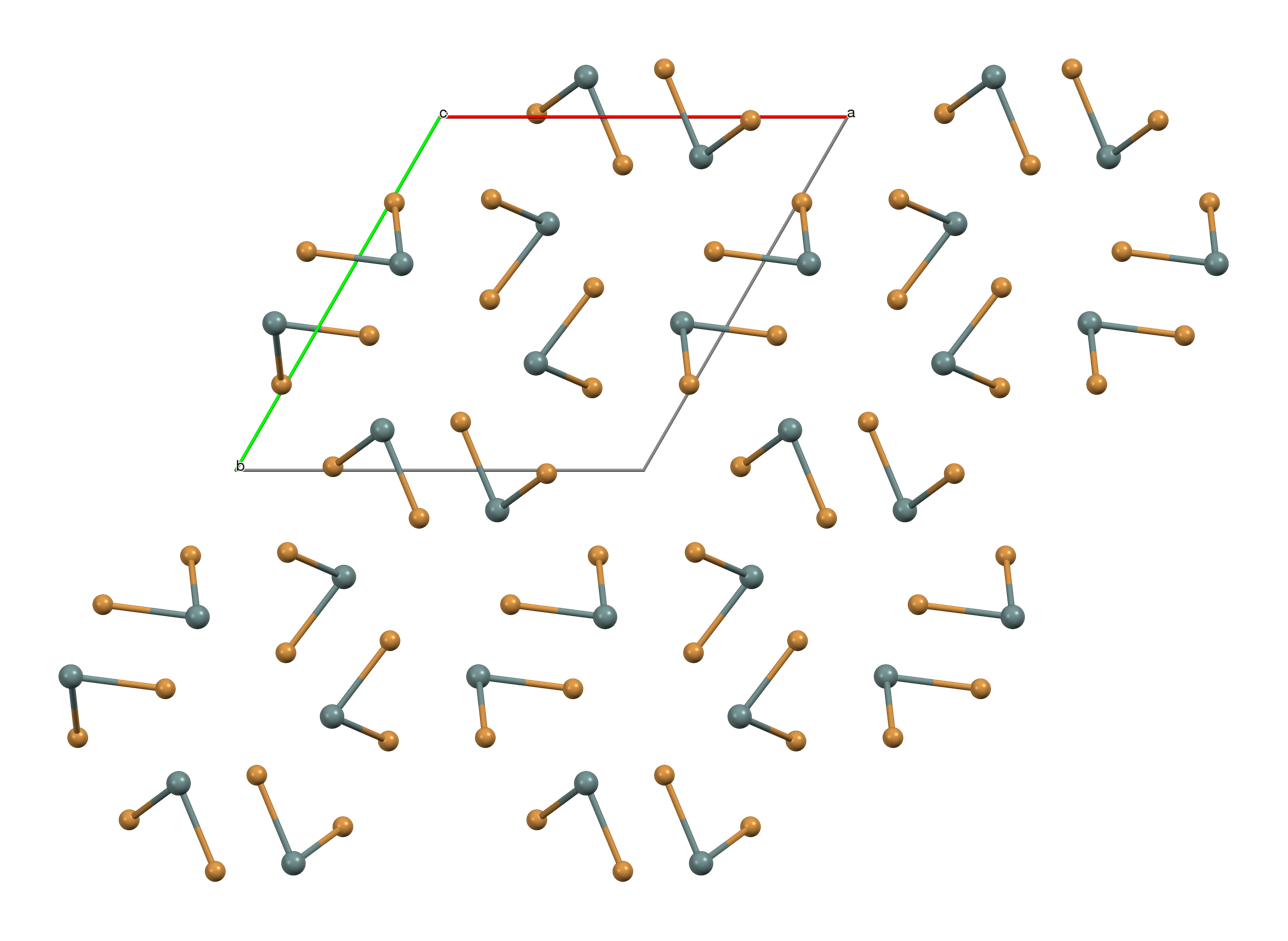
hexagonal polymorph

== Preparation ==
Tin(II) bromide can be prepared by the reaction of metallic tin and HBr distilling off the H_{2}O/HBr and cooling:

Sn + 2 HBr → SnBr_{2} + H_{2}

However, the reaction will produce tin (IV) bromide in the presence of oxygen.

== Reactions ==
SnBr_{2} is soluble in donor solvents such as acetone, pyridine and dimethylsulfoxide to give pyramidal adducts.
A number of hydrates are known, 2SnBr_{2}·H_{2}O, 3SnBr_{2}·H_{2}O and 6SnBr_{2}·5H_{2}O which in the solid phase have tin coordinated by a distorted trigonal prism of 6 bromine atoms with Br or H_{2}O capping 1 or 2 faces. When dissolved in HBr the pyramidal SnBr_{3}^{−} ion is formed. Like SnCl_{2} it is a reducing agent. With a variety of alkyl bromides oxidative addition can occur to yield the alkyltin tribromide e.g.

SnBr_{2} + RBr → RSnBr_{3}

Tin(II) bromide can act as a Lewis acid forming adducts with donor molecules e.g. trimethylamine where it forms NMe_{3}·SnBr_{2} and 2NMe_{3}·SnBr_{2} It can also act as both donor and acceptor in, for example, the complex F_{3}B·SnBr_{2}·NMe_{3} where it is a donor to boron trifluoride and an acceptor to trimethylamine.
