= Rhenium compounds =

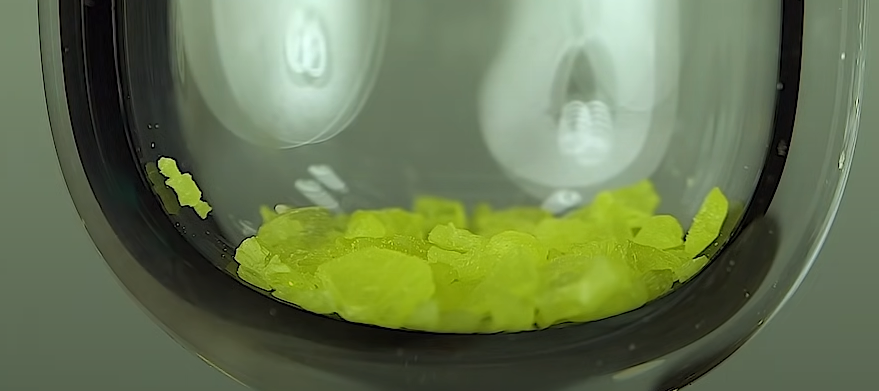
Rhenium(VII) oxide, Re_{2}O_{7}, is a compound of rhenium

Rhenium compounds are compounds formed by the transition metal rhenium (Re). Rhenium can form in many oxidation states, and compounds are known for every oxidation state from −3 to +7 except −2, although the oxidation states +7, +4, and +3 are the most common. Rhenium is most available commercially as salts of perrhenate, including sodium and ammonium perrhenates. These are white, water-soluble compounds. The tetrathioperrhenate anion [ReS_{4}]^{−} is possible.

== Chalcogenides ==
=== Oxides ===
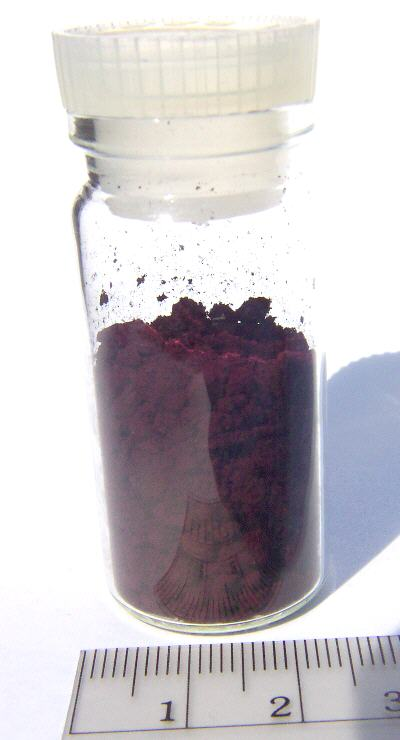
Rhenium(VI) oxide has an appearance similar to that of copper.

Rhenium(IV) oxide (or rhenium dioxide) is an oxide of rhenium, with the formula ReO_{2}. This gray to black crystalline solid is a laboratory reagent that can be used as a catalyst. It adopts the rutile structure. It forms via comproportionation:

2 Re_{2}O_{7} + 3 Re → 7 ReO_{2}

Single crystals are obtained by chemical transport, using iodine as the transporting agent. At high temperatures it undergoes disproportionation. It forms perrhenates with alkaline hydrogen peroxide and oxidizing acids. In molten sodium hydroxide it forms sodium rhenate.

Rhenium(VI) oxide, or rhenium trioxide, is another oxide of rhenium. It is the only stable group 7 trioxide. It has an appearance somewhat like copper. It can be formed by reducing rhenium(VII) oxide with carbon monoxide at 200 °C or elemental rhenium at 400 °C. Re_{2}O_{7} can also be reduced with dioxane. Rhenium trioxide crystallizes with a primitive cubic unit cell, with a lattice parameter of 3.742 Å (374.2 pm). The structure of ReO_{3} is similar to that of perovskite (ABO_{3}), without the large A cation at the centre of the unit cell. Each rhenium center is surrounded by an octahedron defined by six oxygen centers. These octahedra share corners to form the 3-dimensional structure. The coordination number of O is 2, because each oxygen atom has 2 neighbouring Re atoms.

Rhenium(VII) oxide, or rhenium heptoxide, is another oxide of rhenium. It is the anhydride form of perrhenic acid, and is the raw material for all rhenium compounds. Solid Re_{2}O_{7} consists of alternating octahedral and tetrahedral Re centres. Upon heating, the polymer cracks to give molecular (nonpolymeric) Re_{2}O_{7}. This molecular species closely resembles manganese heptoxide, consisting of a pair of ReO_{4} tetrahedra that share a vertex, i.e., O_{3}Re–O–ReO_{3}.

=== Other chalcogenides ===
Rhenium disulfide is a sulfide with the formula ReS_{2}. It has a layered structure where atoms are strongly bonded within each layer. The layers are held together by weak Van der Waals bonds, and can be easily peeled off from the bulk material. It is a two-dimensional (2D) group VII transition metal dichalcogenide (TMD). ReS_{2} was isolated down to monolayers which is only one unit cell in thickness for the first time in 2014. ReS_{2} is found in nature as the mineral rheniite. It can be synthesized from the reaction between rhenium and sulfur at 1000 °C, or the decomposition of rhenium(VII) sulfide at 1100 °C:

Re + 2 S → ReS_{2}
Re_{2}S_{7} → 2 ReS_{2} + 3 S

Rhenium diselenide (ReSe_{2}) also has a layered structure, although, contrary to the other dichalcogenides, rhenium ditelluride does not. In addition, rhenium also forms a heptoxide, which can be produced by the direct reaction of those elements, or through the reaction of ReO_{4}^{−} and H_{2}S in 4N HCl.

== Perrhenates ==
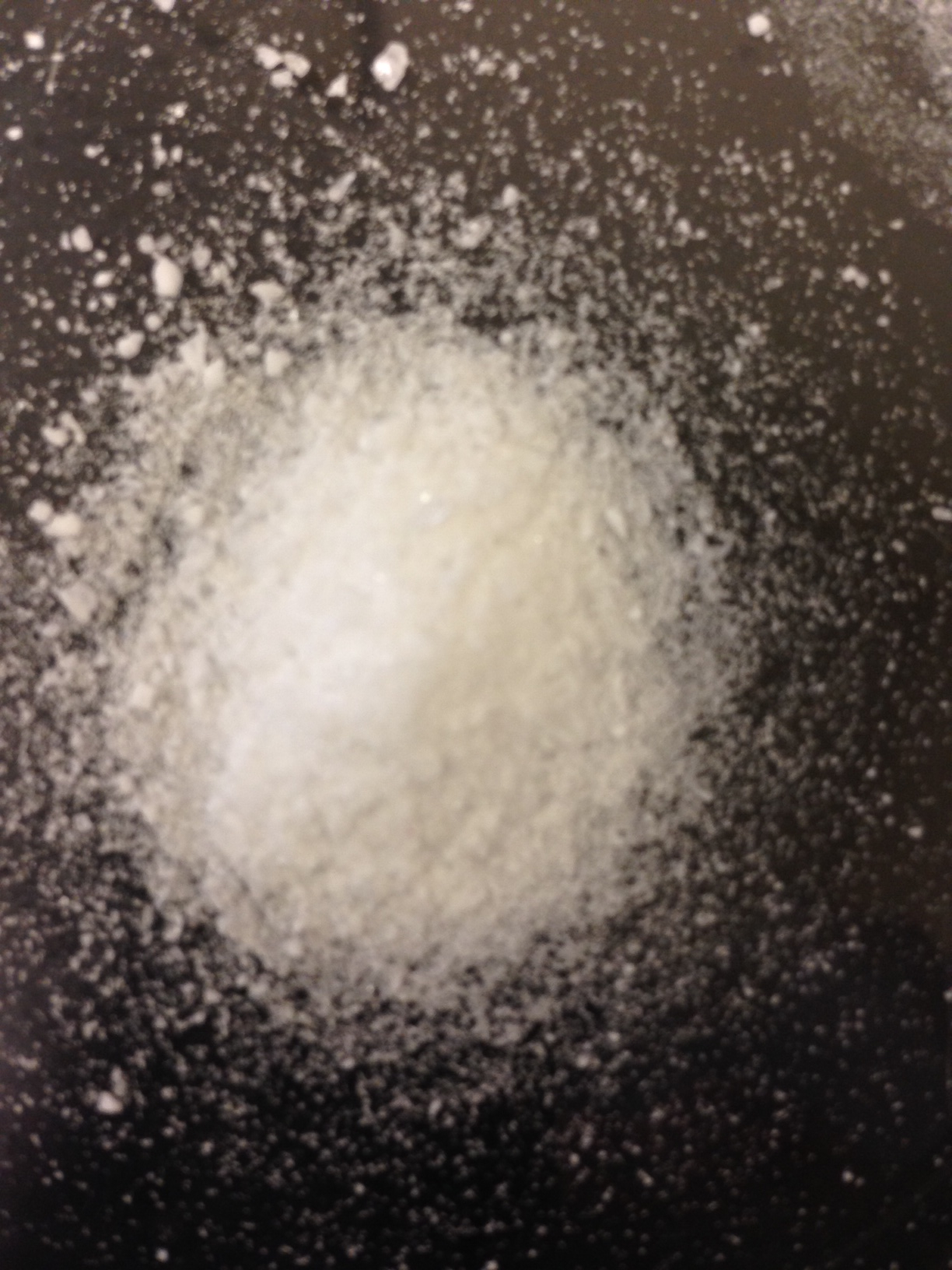
Sample of sodium perrhenate, NaReO_{4}

The perrhenate ion is the anion with the formula ReO^{−}_{4}, or a compound containing this ion. The perrhenate anion is tetrahedral, being similar in size and shape to perchlorate and the valence isoelectronic permanganate. The perrhenate anion is stable over a broad pH range and can be precipitated from solutions with the use of organic cations. At normal pH, perrhenate exists as metaperrhenate (ReO^{−}_{4}), but at high pH mesoperrhenate (ReO^{3−}_{5}) forms. Perrhenate, like its conjugate acid perrhenic acid, features rhenium in the oxidation state of +7 with a d^{0} configuration. Solid perrhenate salts takes on the color of the cation. These salts are prepared by oxidation of rhenium compounds with nitric acid followed by neutralization of the resulting perrhenic acid. Addition of tetrabutylammonium chloride to aqueous solutions of sodium perrhenate gives tetrabutylammonium perrhenate, which is soluble in organic solvents.

== Halides ==
Rhenium can form at least four fluorides, of which rhenium heptafluoride is the most common. This is the only thermally stable metal heptafluoride. It has a pentagonal bipyramidal structure similar to IF_{7}, and can be prepared by the direct reaction of the elements at 400 °C. Combining this with additional rhenium metal at 300 °C in a pressure vessel would produce rhenium hexafluoride. It is one of the seventeen known binary hexafluorides. Both of these fluorides have a very low melting point. In addition to this, rhenium also forms a pentafluoride, which form yellow-green crystals, and a tetrafluoride, which forms blue crystals.

The most common rhenium chlorides are ReCl_{6}, ReCl_{5}, ReCl_{4}, and ReCl_{3}. Unlike fluorine, chlorine cannot oxidize rhenium past +V; the hexachloride is made from the hexafluoride and the heptachloride is entirely unknown. Rhenium(III) chloride (ReCl_{3} or sometimes written as Re_{3}Cl_{9}), is a dark-red hygroscopic solid, prepared from rhenium(V) chloride and insoluble in ordinary solvents. Historically, the trichloride is one of the earliest cluster compounds with recognizable metal-metal multiple bonds. Indeed, all the chlorides feature extensive Re-Re bonding, which appears characteristic of rhenium in oxidation states lower than VII. Salts of [Re_{2}Cl_{8}]^{2−} feature a quadruple metal-metal bond. The metal-metal bonds and antibonds lie close to the Fermi level in many dinuclear chlororhenate complexes; both oxidized and reduced derivatives with lesser bond order (some of them mixed-valence) are known.

Rhenium(III) bromide also adopts the same structure, and is a black lustrous crystalline solid. It can be obtained by the direct reaction between rhenium metal and bromine at 500 °C under nitrogen:

6 Re + 9 Br_{2} → 2 Re_{3}Br_{9}

Rhenium also forms two iodides, rhenium tetraiodide, which can be reduced from perrhenic acid with hydrogen iodide, and rhenium triiodide, which forms from the decomposition of this.

Like tungsten and molybdenum, with which it shares chemical similarities, rhenium forms a variety of oxyhalides. The oxychlorides are most common, and include ReOCl_{4}, ReOCl_{3}.

== Organometallic compounds ==
Dirhenium decacarbonyl is a common entry point to other rhenium carbonyls. The general patterns are similar to the related manganese carbonyls. It is possible to reduce this dimer with sodium amalgam to Na[Re(CO)_{5}] with rhenium in the formal oxidation state −1. Bromination of dirhenium decacarbonyl gives bromopentacarbonylrhenium(I), then reduced with zinc and acetic acid to pentacarbonylhydridorhenium:

Re_{2}(CO)_{10} + Br_{2} → 2 Re(CO)_{5}Br
Re(CO)_{5}Br + Zn + HOAc → Re(CO)_{5}H + ZnBr(OAc)

Bromopentacarbonylrhenium(I) is readily decarbonylated. In refluxing water, it forms the triaquo cation:

Re(CO)_{5}Br + 3 H_{2}O → [Re(CO)_{3}(H_{2}O)_{3}]Br + 2 CO

With tetraethylammonium bromide Re(CO)_{5}Br reacts to give the anionic tribromide:

Re(CO)_{5}Br + 2 NEt_{4}Br → [NEt_{4}]_{2}[Re(CO)_{3}Br_{3}] + 2 CO

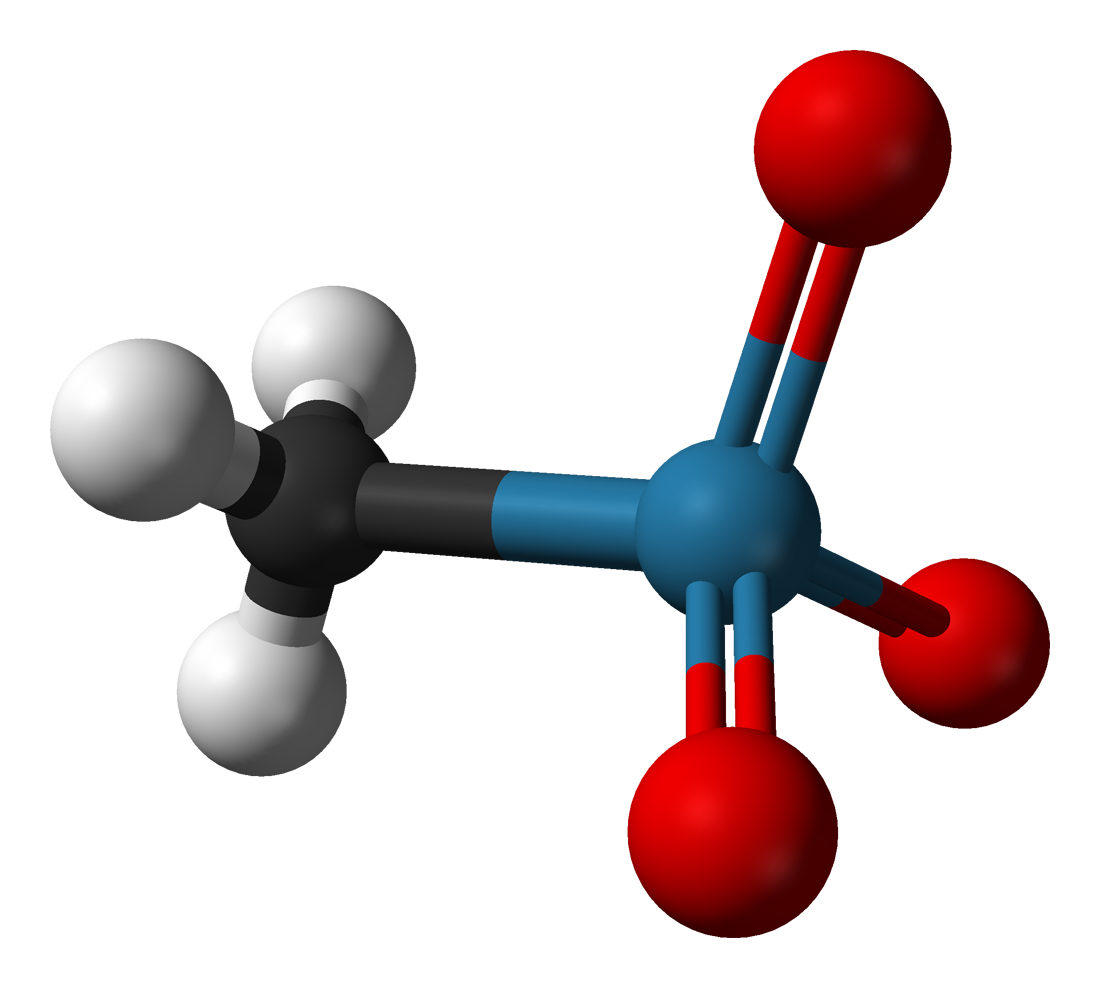
Structure of methylrhenium trioxide

Rhenium forms a variety of alkyl and aryl derivatives, often with pi-donor coligands such as oxo groups. Well known is methylrhenium trioxide ("MTO"), CH_{3}ReO_{3} a volatile, colourless solid, a rare example of a stable high-oxidation state metal alkyl complex. This compound has been used as a catalyst in some laboratory experiments. It can be prepared by many routes, a typical method is the reaction of Re_{2}O_{7} and tetramethyltin:

Re_{2}O_{7} + (CH_{3})_{4}Sn → CH_{3}ReO_{3} + (CH_{3})_{3}SnOReO_{3}

Analogous alkyl and aryl derivatives are known. Although PhReO_{3} is unstable and decomposes at –30 °C, the corresponding sterically hindered mesityl and 2,6-xylyl derivatives (MesReO_{3} and 2,6-(CH_{3})_{2}C_{6}H_{3}ReO_{3}) are stable at room temperature. The electron poor 4-trifluoromethylphenylrhenium trioxide (4-CF_{3}C_{6}H_{4}ReO_{3}) is likewise relatively stable. MTO and other organylrhenium trioxides catalyze oxidation reactions with hydrogen peroxide as well as olefin metathesis in the presence of a Lewis acid activator. Terminal alkynes yield the corresponding acid or ester, internal alkynes yield diketones, and alkenes give epoxides. MTO also catalyses the conversion of aldehydes and diazoalkanes into an alkene.

Rhenium is also able to make complexes with fullerene ligands such as Re_{2}(PMe_{3})_{4}H_{8}(η^{2}:η^{2}C_{60}).

One of the first transition metal hydride complexes to be reported was (C_{5}H_{5})_{2}ReH. A variety of half-sandwich compounds have been prepared from (C_{5}H_{5})Re(CO)_{3} and (C_{5}Me_{5})Re(CO)_{3}. Notable derivatives include the electron-precise oxide (C_{5}Me_{5})ReO_{3} and (C_{5}H_{5})_{2}Re_{2}(CO)_{4}.

== Pictures of rhenium compounds ==
Rhenium compounds
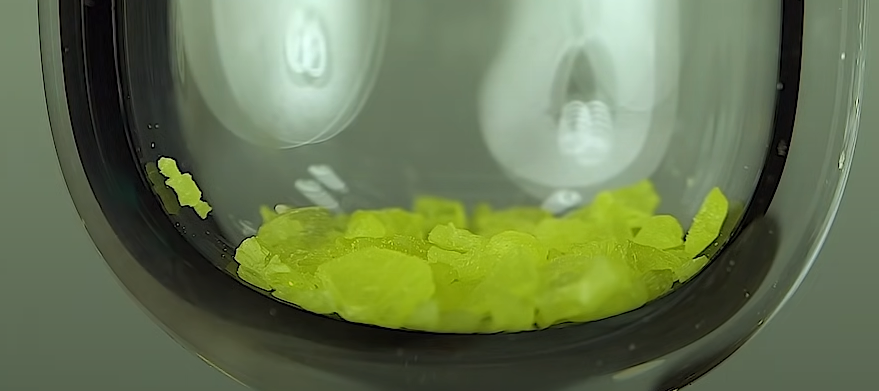
Rhenium(VII) oxide (Re_{2}O_{7})

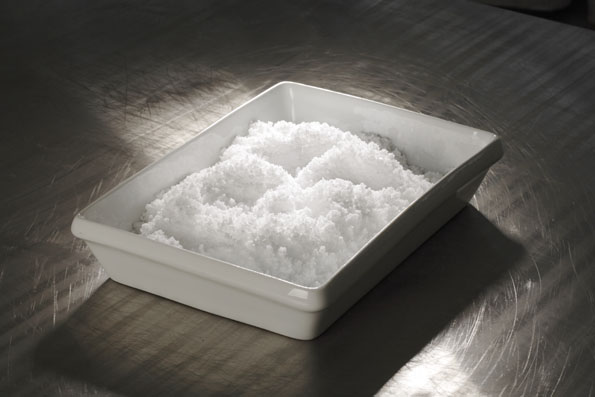
Ammonium perrhenate (NH_{4}ReO_{4})

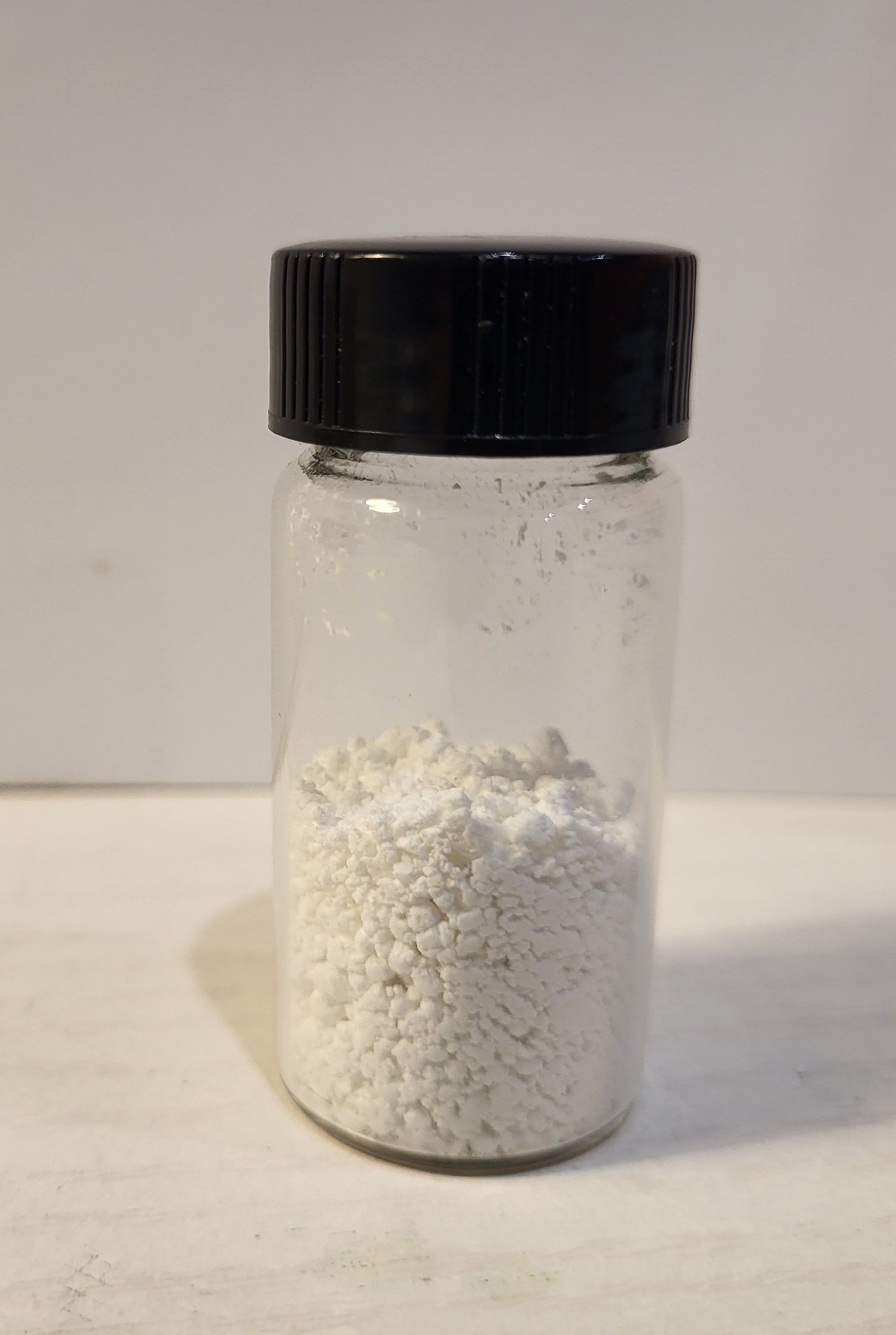
Potassium perrhenate (KReO_{4})

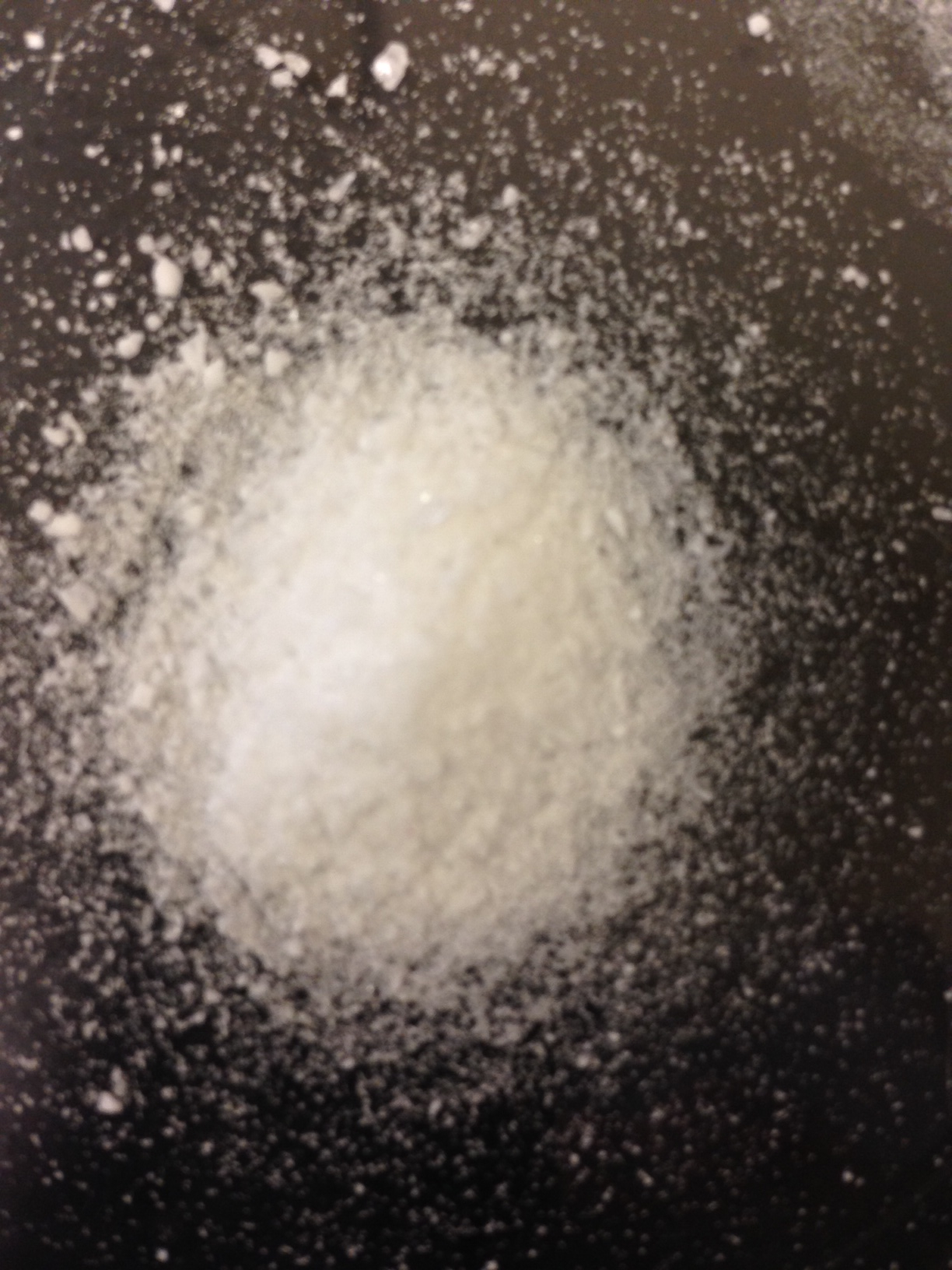
Sodium perrhenate (NaReO_{4})

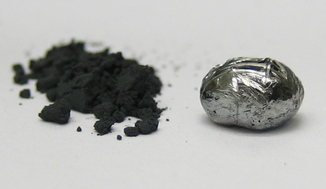
Rhenium diboride (ReB_{2})

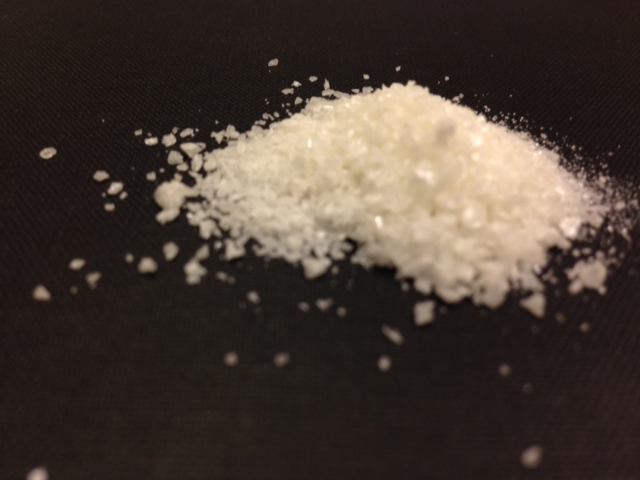
Dirhenium decacarbonyl (Re_{2}(CO)_{10})

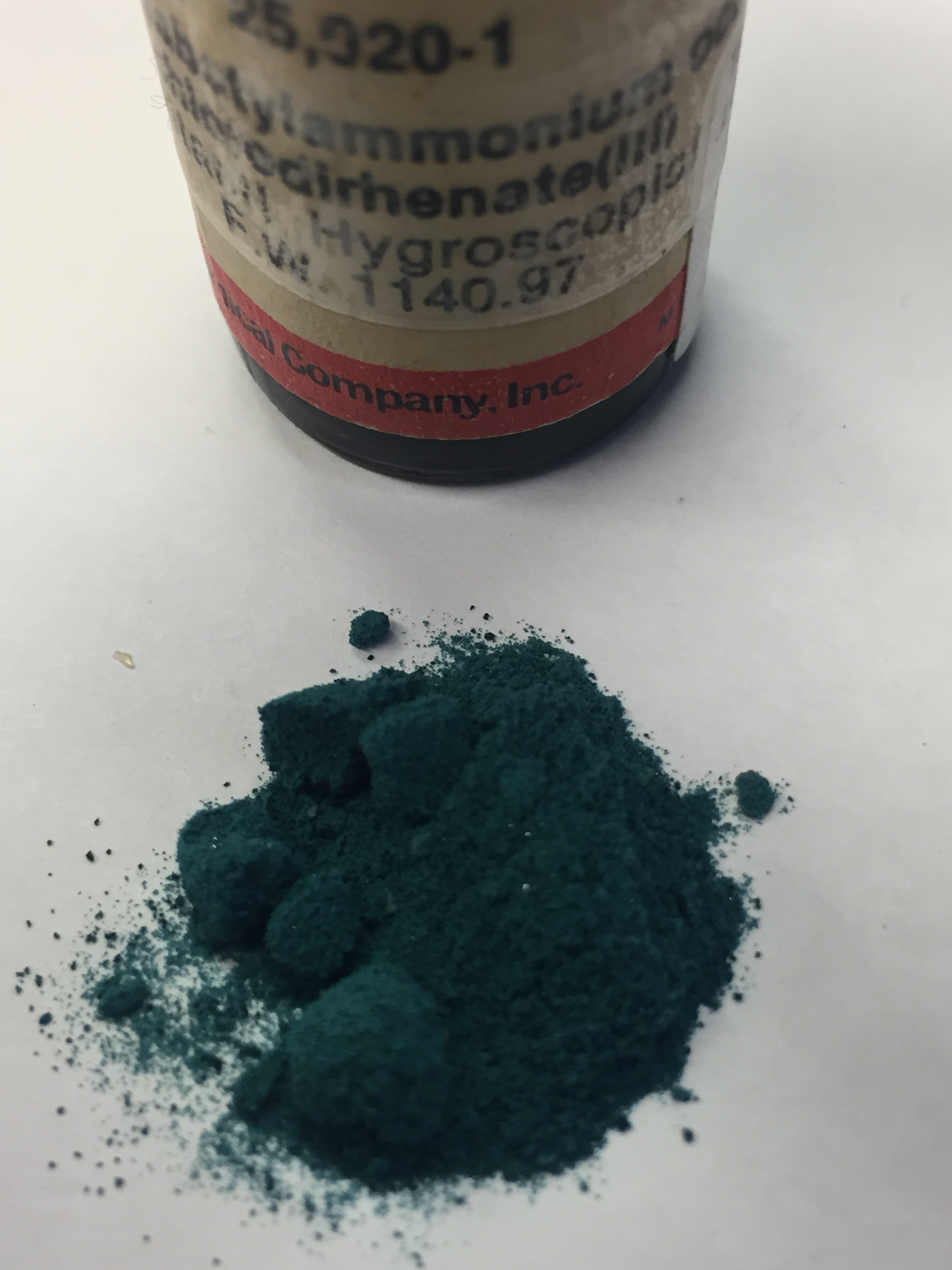
Tetrabutylammonium octachlorodirhenate ((NBu_{4})_{2}Re_{2}Cl_{8})

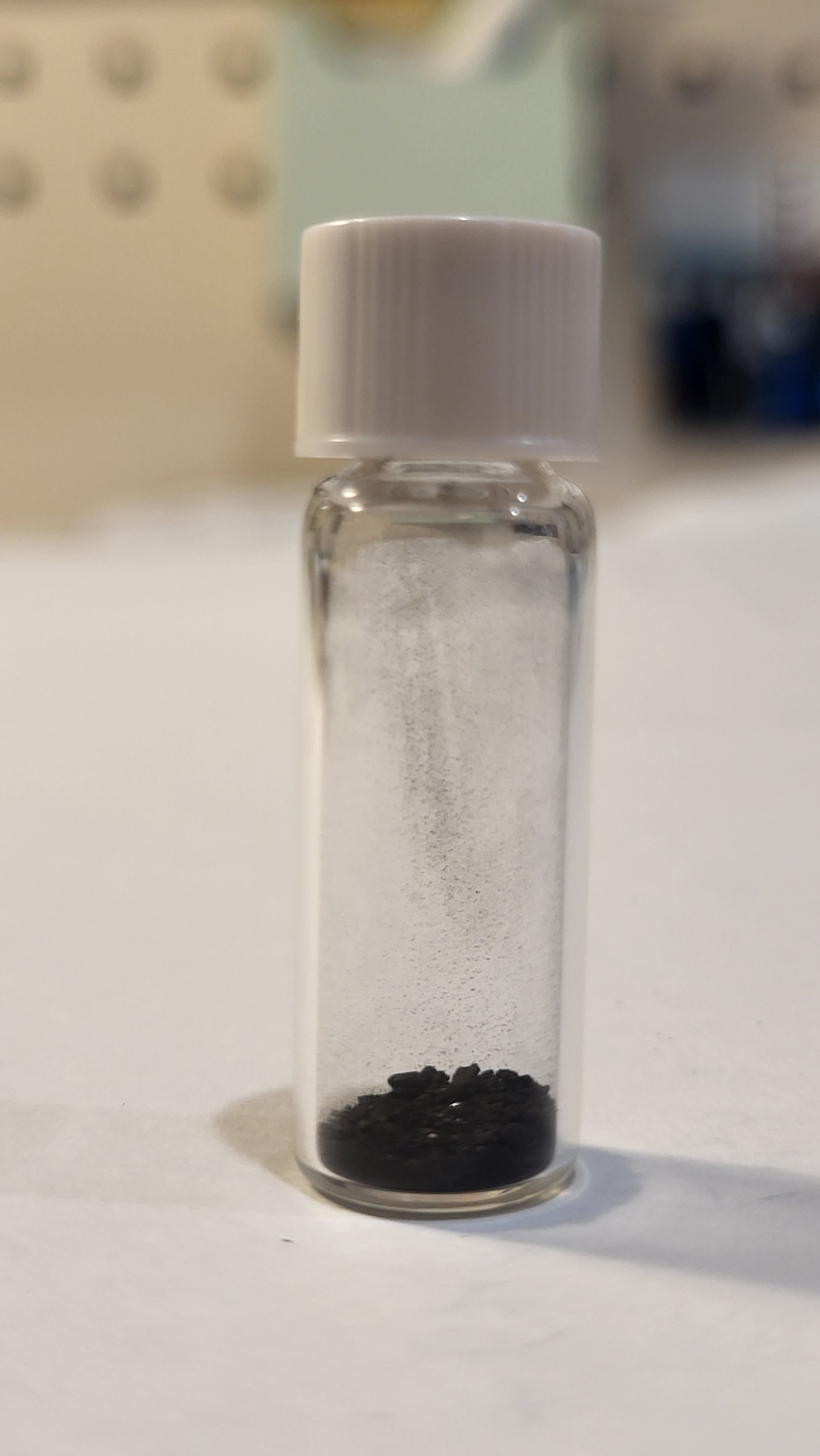
Rhenium(IV) oxide (ReO_{2})

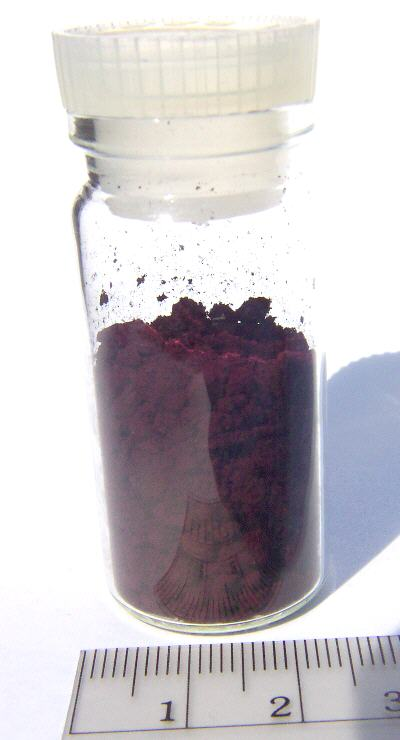
Rhenium(VI) oxide (ReO_{3})

== See also ==
- Perrhenate
- Perrhenic acid
- Rhenium
