= Gallium perrhenate =

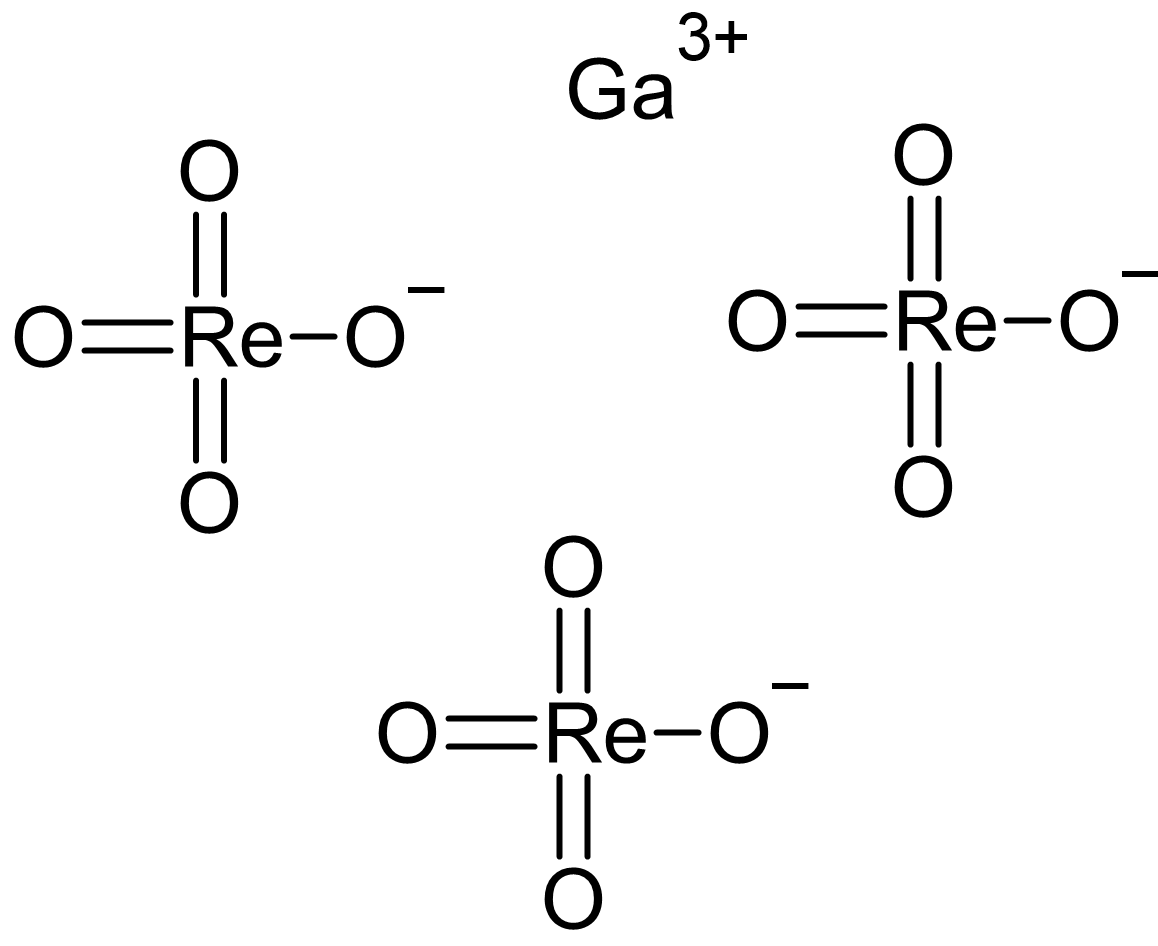

Names
- IUPAC name Gallium rhenate(VII)
- Other names Gallium metaperrhenate

Identifiers
CAS Number	20302-15-2 anhydrous; 20219-39-0 4.5 hydrate; octahydrate: 200636-11-9
3D model (JSmol)	Interactive image; octahydrate: Interactive image
- InChI: InChI=1S/Ga.12O.3Re/q+3;;;;;;;;;;3*-1;;; Key: VCLQMDAITPMMSA-UHFFFAOYSA-N; octahydrate: InChI=1S/Ga.8H2O.12O.3Re/h;8*1H2;;;;;;;;;;;;;;;/q+3;;;;;;;;;;;;;;;;;;3*-1;;; Key: NEAJZHJYRFFORQ-UHFFFAOYSA-N
- SMILES: [Ga+3].O=[Re](=O)(=O)[O-].O=[Re](=O)(=O)[O-].O=[Re](=O)(=O)[O-]; octahydrate: [Ga+3].O=[Re](=O)(=O)[O-].O=[Re](=O)(=O)[O-].O=[Re](=O)(=O)[O-].O.O.O.O.O.O.O.O

Properties
Chemical formula	Ga(ReO_{4})_{3}
Molar mass	820.344
Appearance	White deliquescent crystals (anhydrous)
Solubility in water	Soluble

Related compounds
Other anions	Gallium nitrate Gallium perchlorate
Other cations	Potassium perrhenate
Related compounds	Rhenium(VII) oxide Perrhenic acid
- Except where otherwise noted, data are given for materials in their standard state (at 25 °C [77 °F], 100 kPa). Infobox references

Gallium perrhenate is an inorganic compound with the chemical formula of Ga(ReO_{4})_{3}. It exists in the anhydrous and hydrate forms.

== Preparation ==
Gallium can be anodically dissolved in perrhenic acid at 50-55 °C, and dried with sulfuric acid to obtain the hydrate crystal [Ga(H_{2}O)_{6}(ReO_{4})_{3}]·2H_{2}O. The anhydrous form can be obtained by reacting gallium(III) oxide and rhenium(VII) oxide at 450 °C.

== Chemical properties ==
Gallium perrhenate decomposes above 300 °C to form rhenium(VII) oxide and gallium(III) oxide:

2 Ga(ReO_{4})_{3} → 3 Re_{2}O_{7} + Ga_{2}O_{3}
