= Ammonium perrhenate =

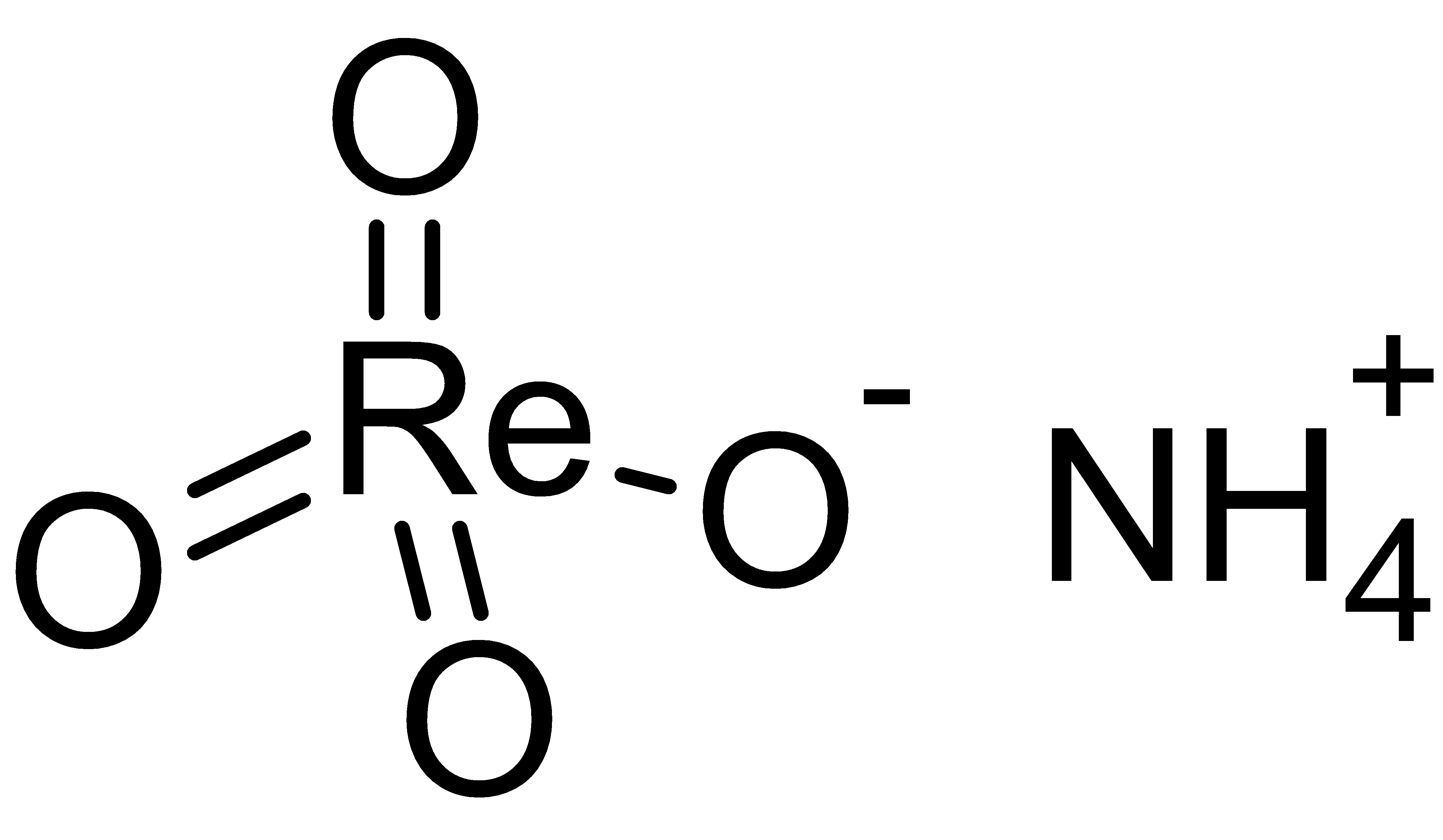
- Ammonium perrhenate

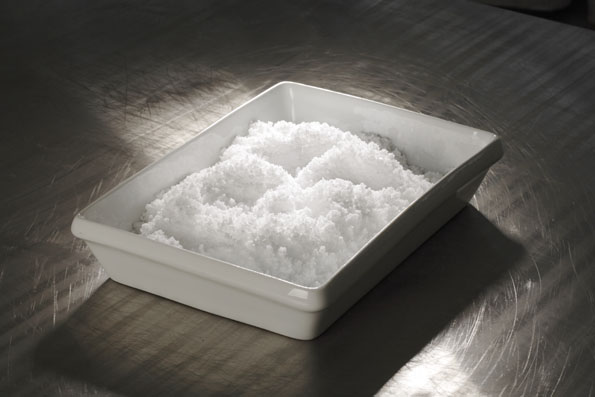

Names
- Other names Ammonium perrhenate, Ammonium perrhenate(VII)

Identifiers
CAS Number	13598-65-7
3D model (JSmol)	Interactive image
ChemSpider	2341271
ECHA InfoCard	100.033.690
EC Number	237-075-6
PubChem CID	3084163
CompTox Dashboard (EPA)	DTXSID10893940
- InChI: InChI=1S/H3N.4O.Re/h1H3;;;;;/q;;;;-1;/p+1 Key: HOJYZCWLNWENHS-UHFFFAOYSA-O; InChI=1/H3N.4O.Re/h1H3;;;;;/q;;;;-1;/p+1/rH3N.O4Re/c;1-5(2,3)4/h1H3;/q;-1/p+1 Key: HOJYZCWLNWENHS-WUACXKGRAA
- SMILES: [O-][Re](=O)(=O)=O.[NH4+]

Properties
Chemical formula	NH_{4}ReO_{4}
Molar mass	268.2359 g/mol
Density	3.97 g/cm^{3}, solid
Melting point	200°C (decomposes)
Solubility in water	2.8 g/100 mL (0 °C), 6.2 g/100 mL (20 °C), 12.0 g/100 mL (40 °C), 20.7 g/100 mL (60 °C), 32.3 g/100 mL (80 °C), 39.1 g/100 mL (90 °C)

Structure
Crystal structure	scheelite
Coordination geometry	N/A

Hazards
Flash point	Non-flammable

Related compounds
Other anions	Ammonium permanganate; ammonium pertechnetate
Other cations	Sodium perrhenate; perrhenic acid
- Except where otherwise noted, data are given for materials in their standard state (at 25 °C [77 °F], 100 kPa). verify (what is ?) Infobox references

Ammonium perrhenate (APR) is the ammonium salt of perrhenic acid, NH_{4}ReO_{4}. It is the most common form in which rhenium is traded. It is a white salt; soluble in ethanol and water, and mildly soluble in NH_{4}Cl. It was first described soon after the discovery of rhenium.

== Structure ==
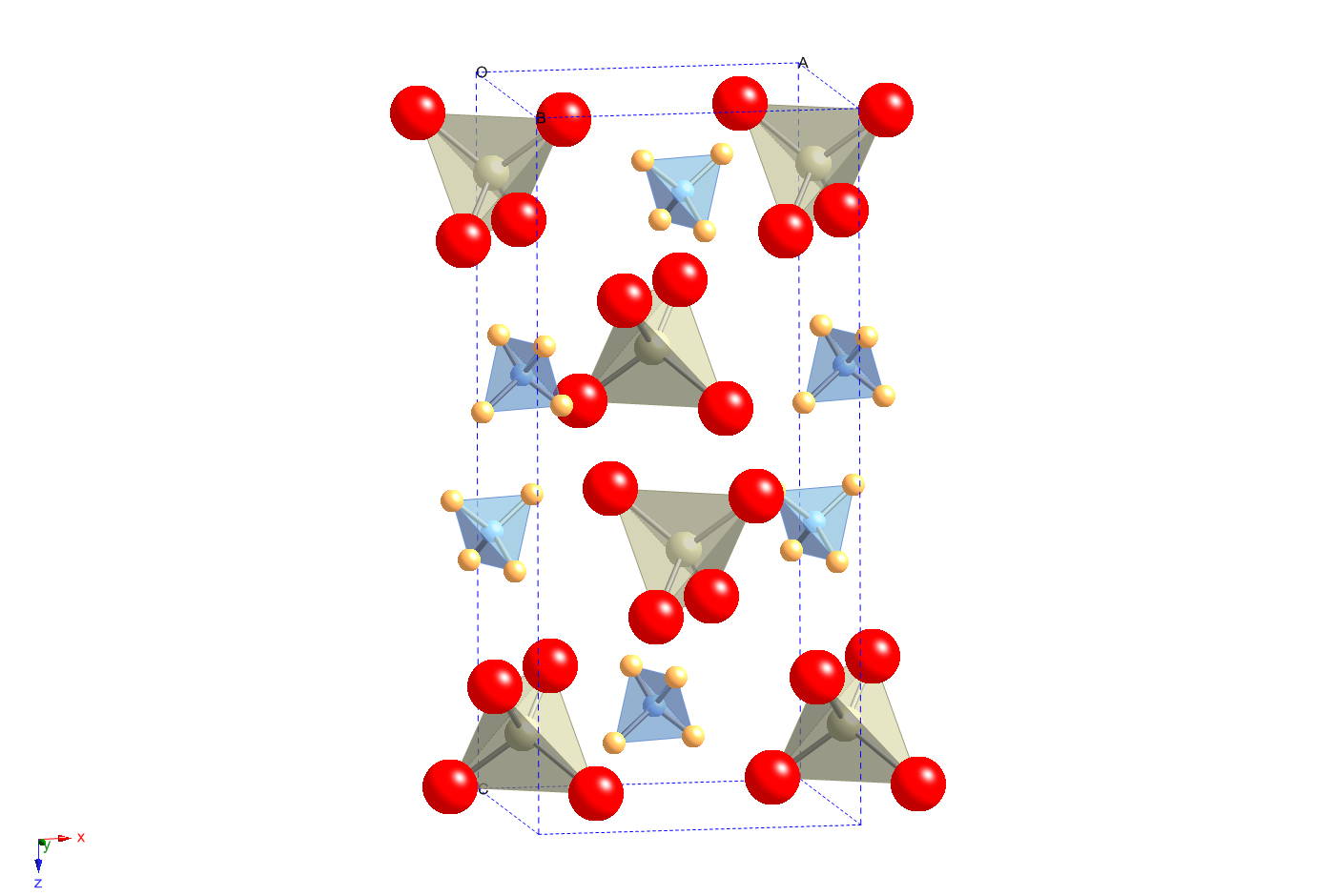
The crystal structure of ammonium perrhenate with orientationally ordered ammonium ions (blue) and ReO_{4} (grey) tetrahedra.

The crystal structure of APR resembles that of scheelite, with atomic cation is replaced by ammonium. The pertechnetate (NH_{4}TcO_{4}), periodate (NH_{4}IO_{4}), tetrachlorothallate (NH_{4}TlCl_{4}), and tetrachloroindate (NH_{4}InCl_{4}) follow this motif. It undergoes a molecular orientational ordering transition on cooling without change of space group, but with a highly anisotropic change in the shape of the unit cell, resulting in the unusual property of having a positive temperature and pressure Re NQR coefficient. APR does not give hydrates.

== Preparation ==
Ammonium perrhenate may be prepared from virtually all common sources of rhenium. The metal, oxides, and sulfides can be oxidized with nitric acid and the resulting solution treated with aqueous ammonia. Alternatively an aqueous solution of Re_{2}O_{7} can be treated with ammonia followed by crystallisation.

== Reactions ==
Ammonium perrhenate is weak oxidizer. It slowly reacts with hydrochloric acid:

NH_{4}ReO_{4} + 6 HCl → NH_{4}[ReCl_{4}O] + Cl_{2} ↑ + 3H_{2}O.

It is reduced to metallic Re upon heating under hydrogen:

2 NH_{4}ReO_{4} + 7 H_{2} → 2 Re + 8 H_{2}O + 2 NH_{3}

Ammonium perrhenate decomposes to volatile Re_{2}O_{7} starting at 250 °C. When heated in a sealed tube at 500 °C, It decomposes to rhenium dioxide:

2NH_{4}ReO_{4} → 2ReO_{2} + N_{2} + 4 H_{2}O

The ammonium ion can be displaced with some concentrated nitrates e.g. potassium nitrate,, silver nitrate, etc.:

NH_{4}ReO_{4} + KNO_{3} → KReO_{4} ↓ + NH_{4}NO_{3}

It can be reduced to nonahydridorhenate with sodium in ethanol:

NH_{4}ReO_{4} + 18Na + 13C_{2}H_{5}OH → Na_{2}[ReH_{9}] + 13NaC_{2}H_{5}O + 3NaOH + NH_{3}•H_{2}O.
