= Oxotrichlorobis(triphenylphosphine)rhenium(V) =

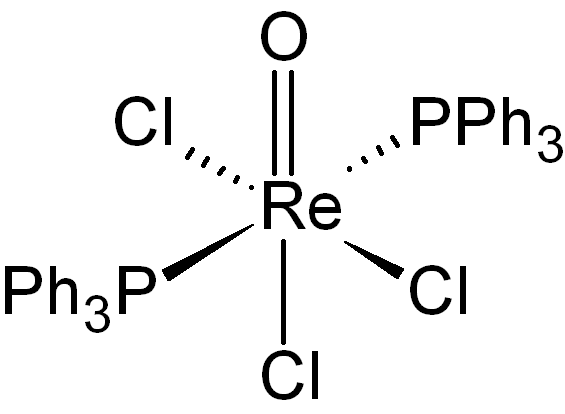

Names
- IUPAC name Trichloridooxidobis(triphenylphosphane)rhenium(V)

Identifiers
CAS Number	17442-18-1
3D model (JSmol)	Interactive image; Interactive image
ChemSpider	19374409
PubChem CID	25210853
- InChI: InChI=1S/2C18H15P.3ClH.O.Re/c2*1-4-10-16(11-5-1)19(17-12-6-2-7-13-17)18-14-8-3-9-15-18;;;;;/h2*1-15H;3*1H;;/q;;;;;-2;+5/p-3 Key: QYKOBCZMNRLXRH-UHFFFAOYSA-K
- SMILES: Cl[Re-2](Cl)(Cl)(=O)([P+](c1ccccc1)(c1ccccc1)c1ccccc1)[P+](c2ccccc2)(c2ccccc2)c2ccccc2; C1(P(C2=CC=CC=C2)C3=CC=CC=C3)=CC=CC=C1.C4(P(C5=CC=CC=C5)C6=CC=CC=C6)=CC=CC=C4.[O-2].[Cl-].[Cl-].[Cl-].[Re+5]

Properties
Chemical formula	ReOCl_{3}(PPh_{3})_{2}
Molar mass	833.15 g/mol
Appearance	yellow microcrystals
Melting point	205 °C (401 °F; 478 K)
Solubility in water	not soluble in water
- Except where otherwise noted, data are given for materials in their standard state (at 25 °C [77 °F], 100 kPa). verify (what is ?) Infobox references

Oxotrichlorobis(triphenylphosphine)rhenium(V) is the chemical compound with the formula ReOCl_{3}(PPh_{3})_{2}. This yellow, air-stable solid is a precursor to a variety of other rhenium complexes. In this diamagnetic compound, Re has an octahedral coordination environment with one oxo, three chloro and two mutually trans triphenylphosphine ligands. The oxidation state of rhenium is +5 and its configuration is d^{2}.

== Synthesis ==
ReOCl_{3}(PPh_{3})_{2} is commercially available, but it is readily synthesized by reaction of perrhenic acid with triphenylphosphine in a mixture of hydrochloric acid and acetic acid. In this reaction, Re(VII) is reduced to Re(V), and triphenylphosphine is oxidized to its oxide.

HReO_{4} + 3 HCl + 3 PPh_{3} → ReOCl_{3}(PPh_{3})_{2} + Ph_{3}PO + 2 H_{2}O

The required perrhenic acid solution can be prepared in situ from rhenium(VII) oxide.

== Uses ==
ReOCl_{3}(PPh_{3})_{2} is a precursor to a variety of other oxo-, nitridio, and hydrido complexes. It converts to ReH_{7}(PPh_{3})_{2} by a treatment with LiAlH_{4}.

ReOCl_{3}(PPh_{3})_{2} catalyzes the selective oxidation of secondary alcohols by DMSO, producing the corresponding ketals.
