= Rhenium oxide =

Rhenium oxide may refer to:

- Rhenium(IV) oxide, ReO_{2}
- Rhenium trioxide, ReO_{3}
- Rhenium(VII) oxide, Re_{2}O_{7}
