= Gadolinium perrhenate =

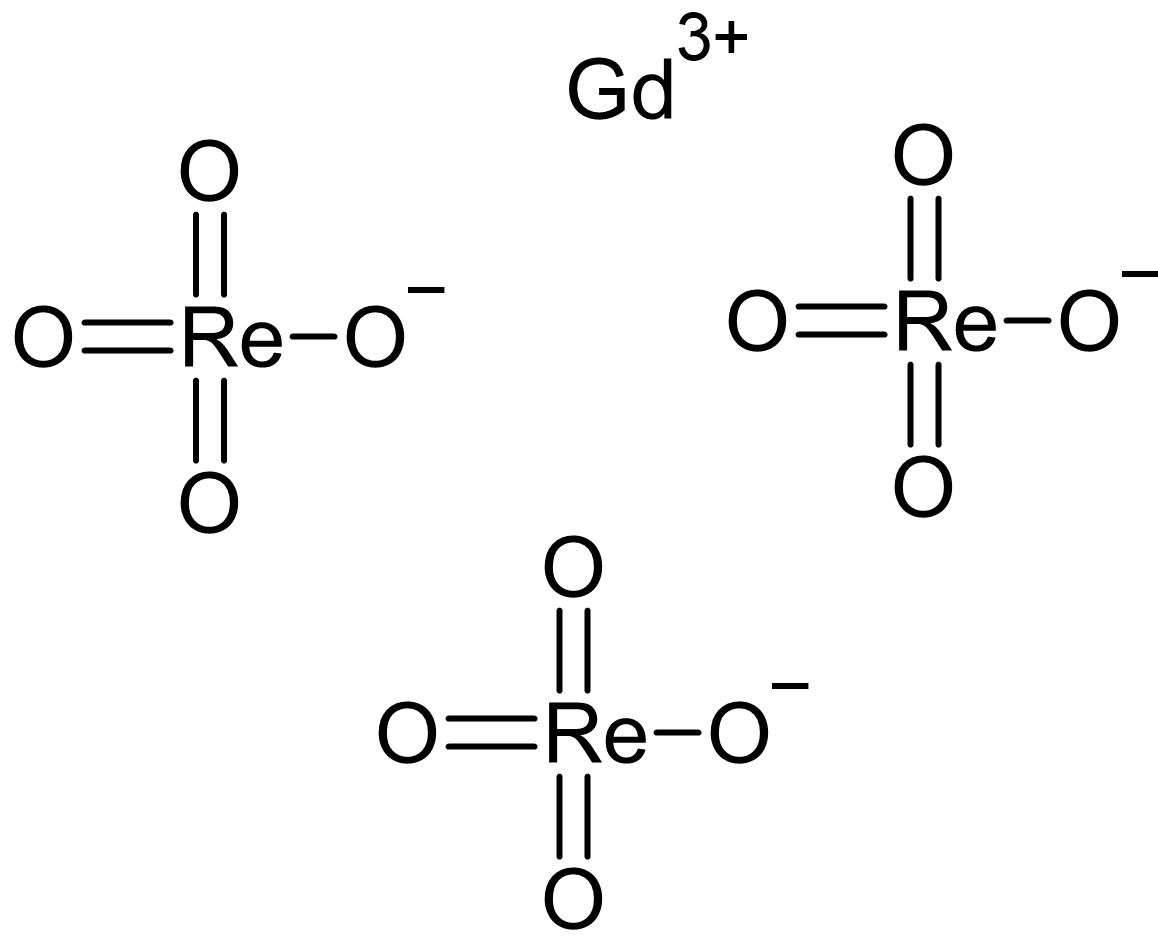

Identifiers
CAS Number	anhydrous: 14020-44-1; tetrahydrate: 15078-75-8
3D model (JSmol)	anhydrous: Interactive image; tetrahydrate: Interactive image
- InChI: anhydrous: InChI=1S/Gd.12O.3Re/q+3;;;;;;;;;;3*-1;;; Key: UQBMPTDTGOQFJN-UHFFFAOYSA-N; tetrahydrate: InChI=1S/Gd.4H2O.12O.3Re/h;4*1H2;;;;;;;;;;;;;;;/q+3;;;;;;;;;;;;;;3*-1;;; Key: KRJIIOBDMJEHQA-UHFFFAOYSA-N
- SMILES: anhydrous: [Gd+3].[O-][Re](=O)(=O)=O.[O-][Re](=O)(=O)=O.[O-][Re](=O)(=O)=O; tetrahydrate: [Gd+3].[O-][Re](=O)(=O)=O.[O-][Re](=O)(=O)=O.[O-][Re](=O)(=O)=O.O.O.O.O

Properties
Chemical formula	Gd(ReO_{4})_{3}
Solubility	soluble in water and ethanol
- Except where otherwise noted, data are given for materials in their standard state (at 25 °C [77 °F], 100 kPa). Infobox references

Gadolinium perrhenate is an inorganic compound, with the chemical formula of Gd(ReO_{4})_{3}. It can be obtained by dissolving an excess of gadolinium oxide in a perrhenic acid solution (240 g/L) in the presence of hydrogen peroxide, from which the hydrates are precipitated. Its tetrahydrate loses water by heating to obtain the anhydrous form, which then decomposes at high temperatures to generate gadolinium oxide and rhenium heptoxide.
