= Rhenium(III) iodide =

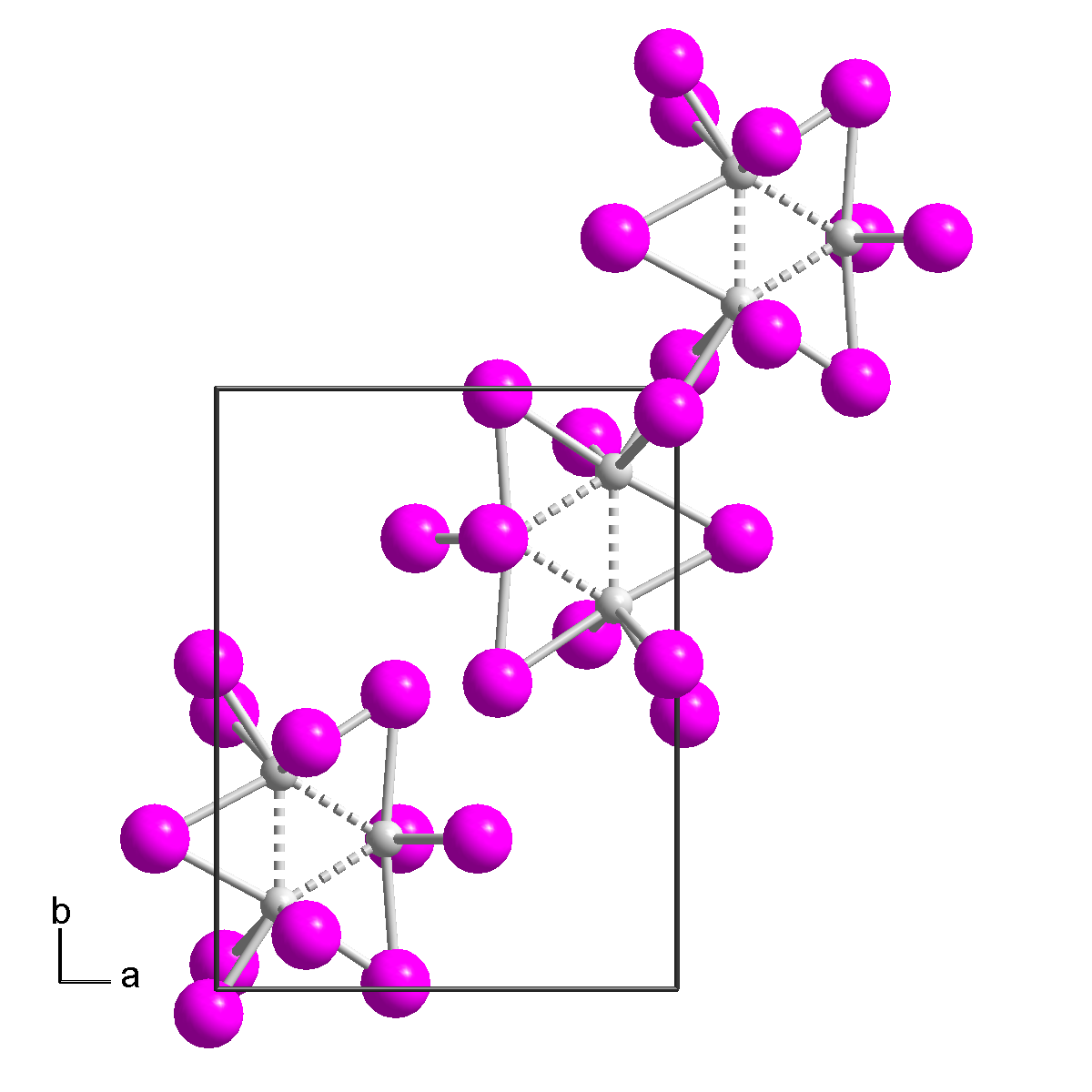

Names
- Other names Rhenium(III) iodide, triiodorhenium

Identifiers
CAS Number	15622-42-1
3D model (JSmol)	Interactive image
ChemSpider	21170009
ECHA InfoCard	100.036.074
EC Number	239-698-9
PubChem CID	12984320
CompTox Dashboard (EPA)	DTXSID60275813
- InChI: InChI=1S/3HI.Re/h3*1H;/q;;;+3/p-3 Key: DDMQJDMHHOTHKW-UHFFFAOYSA-K
- SMILES: I[Re](I)I

Properties
Chemical formula	I_{3}Re
Molar mass	566.920 g·mol^{−1}
Appearance	violet-black crystals
Density	6.37 g/cm^{3}
Melting point	800 °C (1,470 °F; 1,070 K)
Solubility in water	poorly soluble

Structure
Crystal structure	monoclinic

Related compounds
Related compounds	Iridium triiodide
- Except where otherwise noted, data are given for materials in their standard state (at 25 °C [77 °F], 100 kPa). Infobox references

Rhenium(III) iodide is a binary chemical compound of rhenium and iodide with the chemical formula ReI_{3}.

== Synthesis ==
Rhenium(III) iodide can be synthesized by the decomposition of rhenium(IV) iodide:

2ReI_{4} → 2ReI_{3} + I_{2}

Another way to make it is by introduction of ethanol into a mixture of perrhenic acid and hydroiodic acid.

HReO_{4} + 3HI + 2C_{2}H_{5}OH → ReI_{3} + 4H_{2}O + 2CH_{3}CHO

== Physical properties ==
Rhenium(III) iodide forms violet-black crystals. It is poorly soluble in water, acetone, ethanol, ether, and dilute acid solutions.

== Chemical properties ==
When heated in vacuum up to 170 °C, the compound decomposes to rhenium(II) iodide, and at 380 °C — to rhenium(I) iodide:

2ReI_{3} → 2ReI_{2} + I_{2}
ReI_{3} → ReI + I_{2}
