= Potassium nonahydridorhenate =

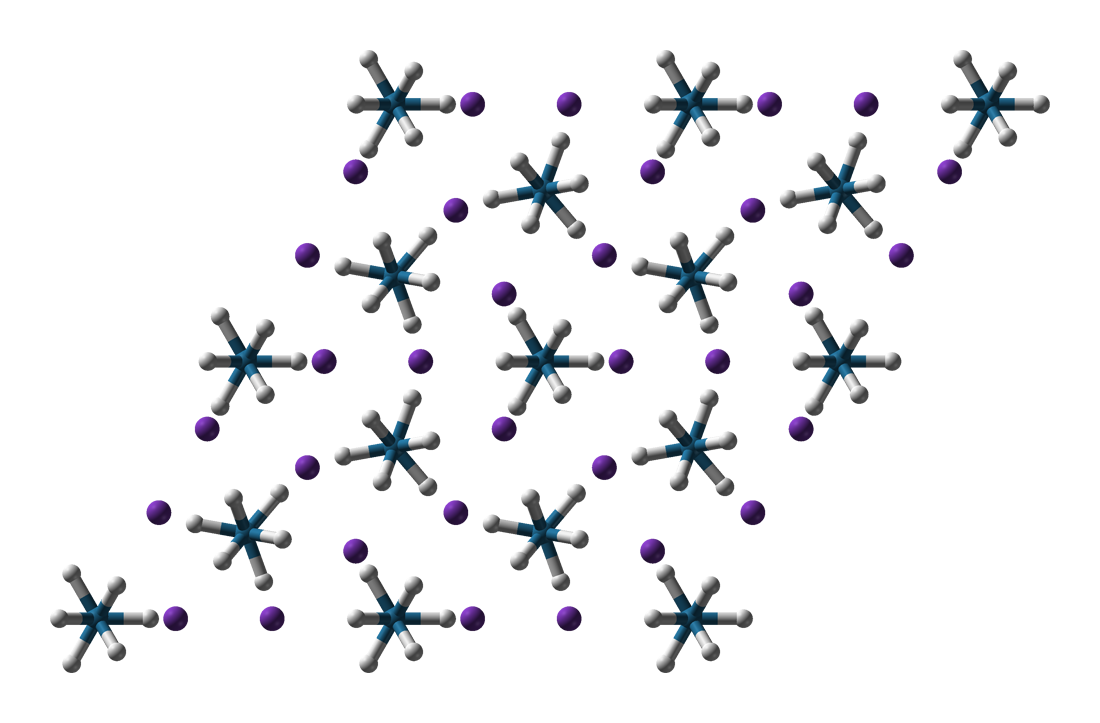

Names
- Other names: Potassium nonahydridorhenate(VII); Potassium nonahydrorhenate(VII)

Identifiers
CAS Number	25396-46-7
3D model (JSmol)	Interactive image
- InChI: InChI=1S/2K.Re.9H/q2*+1;-2;;;;;;;;; Key: VDZMOWIIXPKPTA-UHFFFAOYSA-N
- SMILES: [K+].[K+].[ReH9-2]

Properties
Chemical formula	K_{2}[ReH_{9}]
Molar mass	273.473 g/mol
Appearance	white solid
Solubility in water	soluble
- Except where otherwise noted, data are given for materials in their standard state (at 25 °C [77 °F], 100 kPa). verify (what is ?) Infobox references

Potassium nonahydridorhenate(VII) is an inorganic compound having the formula K_{2}[ReH_{9}]. This colourless salt is soluble in water but only poorly soluble in most alcohols. This salt contains the nonahydridorhenate(VII) anion, [ReH_{9}]^{2−}, which is a rare example of a coordination complex bearing only hydride ligands.

== History ==
The study of rhenium hydrides can be traced to the 1950s and included reports of the "rhenide" anion, supposedly Re^{−}. These reports led to a series of investigations by A. P. Ginsberg and coworkers on the products from the reduction of perrhenate.

The rhenide anion, Re^{−}, was based on the product of the reduction of perrhenate salts, such as the reduction of potassium perrhenate (KReO_{4}) by potassium metal. "Potassium rhenide" was shown to exist as a tetrahydrated complex, with the postulated chemical formula KRe·4H_{2}O (potassium rhenide tetrahydrate). This compound exhibits strongly reducing properties, and slowly yields hydrogen gas when dissolved in water. The lithium and thallous salts were also reported. Later research, however, indicates that the "rhenide" ion is actually a hydridorhenate complex. "Potassium rhenide" was shown to be in fact the potassium nonahydridorhenate(VII), K_{2}[ReH_{9}], containing the nonahydridorhenate(VII) anion, [ReH_{9}]^{2−}, in which the oxidation state of rhenium is actually +7. Other methods of reduction of perrhenate salts yield compounds containing other hydrido- complexes, including ReH_{3}(OH)_{3}(H_{2}O)^{−}.

== Structure, synthesis, and properties ==
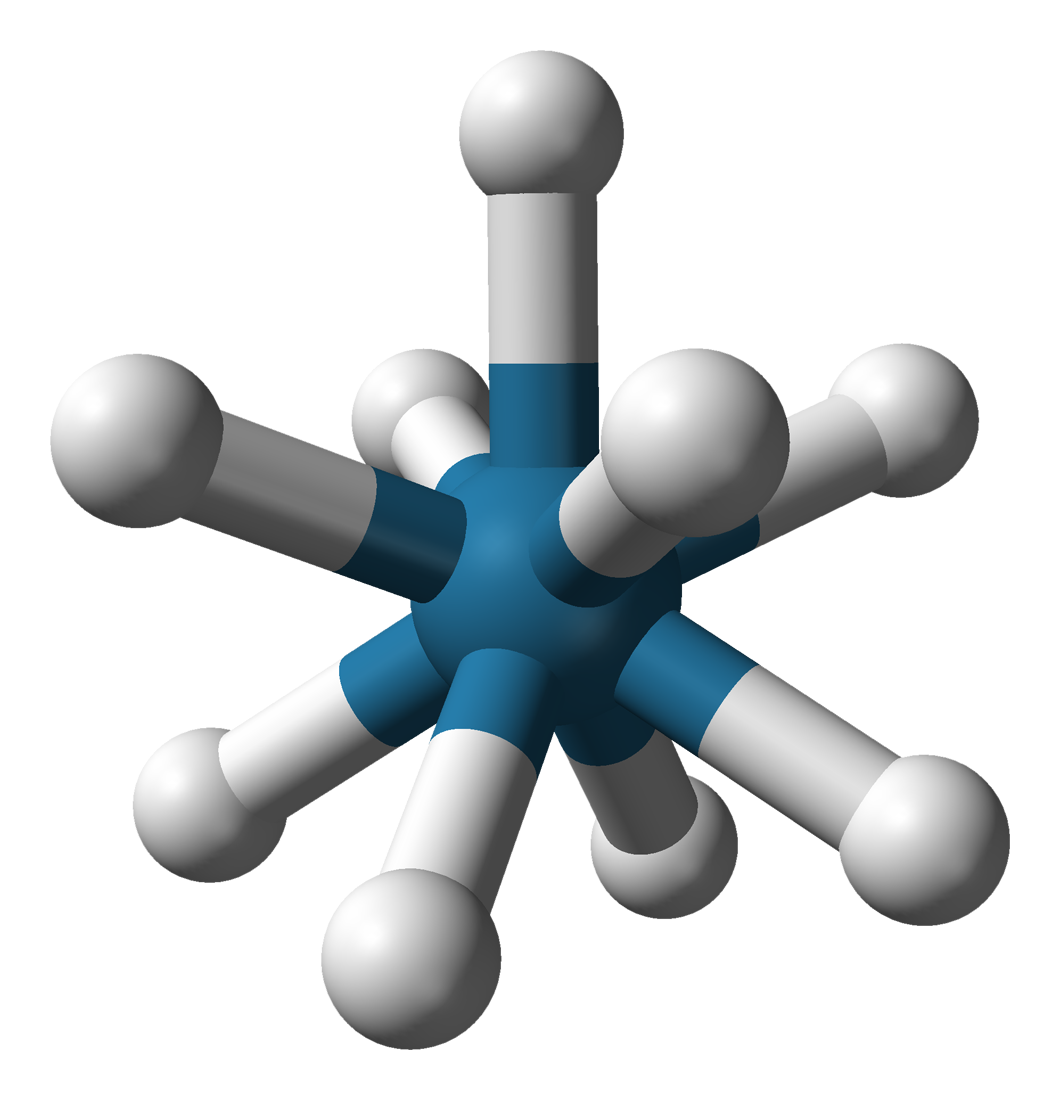
Structure of the [ReH_{9}]^{2−} anion, a tricapped trigonal prism.

[ReH_{9}]^{2−} is an unusual example of a nonacoordinated complex, its high coordination number being attributed to the small size of the hydride ligand and the high positive charge on the Re(VII) central atom. Its structure consists of a tricapped trigonal prism, as determined by neutron crystallography. The diamagnetic sodium salt, like the analogous technetium compound, is prepared by treating an ethanol solution of sodium perrhenate, NaReO_{4}, with sodium metal. Via cation exchange, it can be converted to the corresponding tetraethylammonium salt, ([(CH_{3}CH_{2})_{4}N]^{+})_{2}[ReH_{9}]^{2−} (tetraethylammonium nonahydridorhenate(VII)).

Isostructural with [ReH_{9}]^{2−} (nonahydridotechnetate(VII)), [TcH_{9}]^{2−} consists of a trigonal prism with Tc atom in the center and six hydrogen atoms at the corners. Three more hydrogen ligands define a triangle lying parallel to the base and crossing the prism in its center (see figure). Although those hydride ligands are not equivalent, their electronic structure is almost the same. The coordination number of 9 in this complex is the highest known for any rhenium complex.

Recent density functional theory calculations on [ReH_{9}]^{2−} indicate that this dianion adopts the D_{3h}⇌C_{4v}⇌D_{3h} pathway in gas phase and solution, such interconversion originally proposed by Muetterties featuring a capped square antiprism structure as transition state has very low energy barrier. In K_{2}[ReH_{9}] solid, intramolecular motions of [ReH_{9}]^{2−} include (1) circle-dance mechanism (resembling Matisse's painting Dance (II)) and (2) three-arm turnstile rotation.
