= Tricapped trigonal prismatic molecular geometry =

Molecular geometry

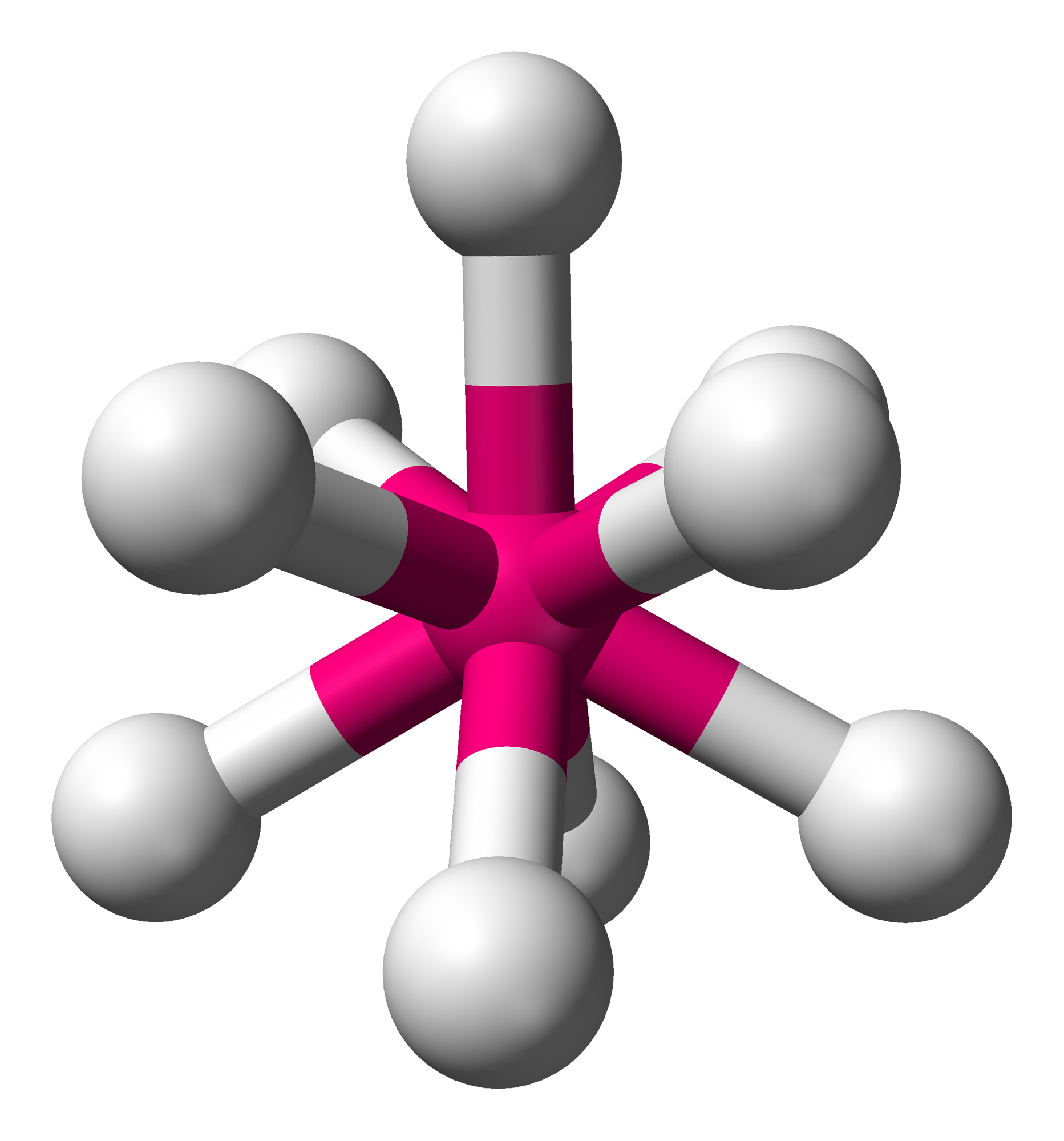
- Examples: ReH^{2−}_{9}
- Point group: D_{3h}
- Coordination number: 9
- μ (Polarity): 0

In chemistry, the tricapped trigonal prismatic molecular geometry describes one possible shape of compounds where nine atoms, groups of atoms, or ligands are arranged around a central atom, defining the vertices of a triaugmented triangular prism (a trigonal prism with an extra atom attached to each of its three rectangular faces).

It is very similar to the capped square antiprismatic molecular geometry, and there is some dispute over the specific geometry exhibited by certain molecules. For example, lanthanoid nine-coordinate 3+ complexes do not have a rigidly defined molecular geometry, meaning their assignment to a singular molecular geometry is problematic. These complexes have significant both tricapped trigonal prismatic and capped square antiprismatic character to their geometries

== Examples ==
- TcH^{2−}_{9}
- ReH^{2−}_{9}
- Ln(H_{2}O)^{3+}_{9} (Ln = La, Ce, Pr, Nd, Pm, Sm, Eu, Gd, Tb, Dy)
- Th(H_{2}O)^{4+}_{9}
