= Capped square antiprismatic molecular geometry =

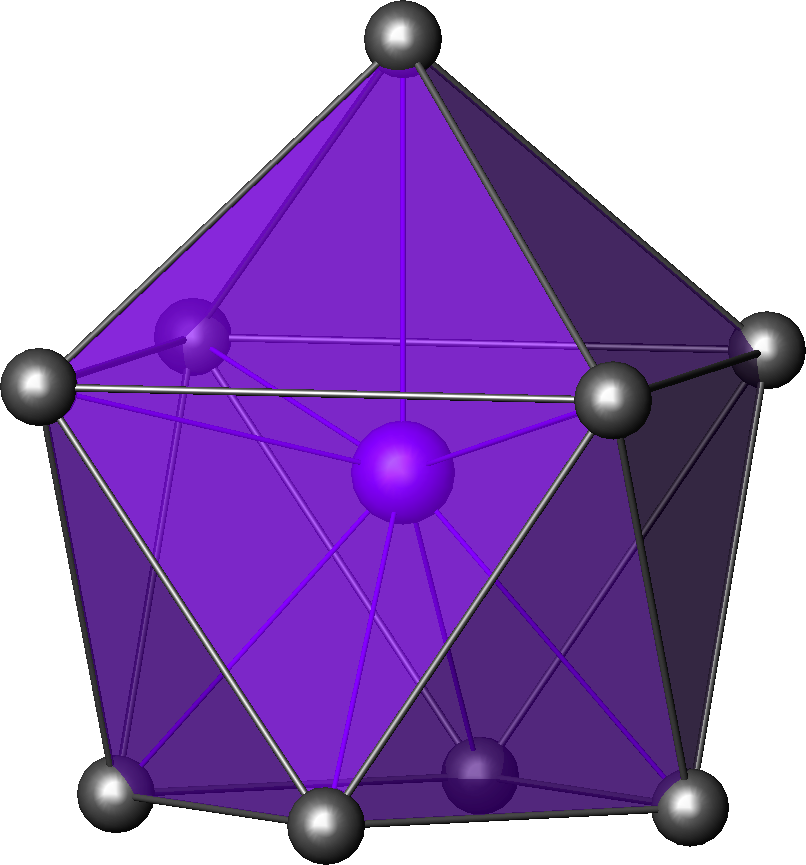
- Point group: C_{4v}
- Coordination number: 9

In chemistry, the capped square antiprismatic molecular geometry describes one possible shape of compounds where nine atoms, groups of atoms, or ligands are arranged around a central atom, defining the vertices of a gyroelongated square pyramid. The symmetry group of the resulting object is C_{4v}.

The gyroelongated square pyramid is a square pyramid with a square antiprism connected to the square base. In this respect, it can be seen as a "capped" square antiprism (a square antiprism with a pyramid erected on one of the square faces).

It is very similar to the tricapped trigonal prismatic molecular geometry, and there is some dispute over the specific geometry exhibited by certain molecules. Examples:

- [SiCo_{9}(CO)_{21}]^{2-}, defined by the Co_{9} framework, which encapsulates the Si atom
- [Pb(phen)_{4}(OClO_{3})]^{+}, defined by the N_{8}O framework, which encapsulates the Pb^{2+} ion
- [Ge_{9}]^{4−}, a zintl ion
- Th(troopolonate)_{4}(H_{2}O), defined by the O_{9} framework, which encapsulates the Th^{4+} ion
- ReH^{2−}_{9} is sometimes described as having a capped square antiprismatic geometry, although its geometry is most often described as tricapped trigonal prismatic.
- [LaCl(H_{2}O)_{7}]^{4+}_{2}, a lanthanum(III) complex with a La–La bond.

== Bicapped square antiprismatic molecular geometry ==
Square antiprisms can be capped on both square faces, giving bicapped square antiprismatic molecular geometry. The bicapped square antiprismatic atoms surrounding a central atom define the vertices of a gyroelongated square bipyramid. The symmetry group of this object is D_{4d}.

Examples:

- B_{10}H_{12}, defined by the B_{10} framework
- [AsRh_{10}(CO)_{22}]^{3−} and [SRh_{10}(CO)_{22}]^{2−}, defined by the Rh_{10} framework, which encapsulates the main group atoms As and S
- [TlSn_{8}]^{3−}, a zintl ion
