= Perrhenate =

The perrhenate ion is the anion with the formula ReO^{−}_{4}, or a compound containing this ion. The perrhenate anion is tetrahedral, being similar in size and shape to perchlorate and the valence isoelectronic permanganate. The perrhenate anion is stable over a broad pH range and can be precipitated from solutions with the use of organic cations. At normal pH, perrhenate exists as metaperrhenate (ReO^{−}_{4}), but at high pH mesoperrhenate (ReO^{3−}_{5}) forms. Perrhenate, like its conjugate acid perrhenic acid, features rhenium in the oxidation state of +7 with a d^{0} configuration. Solid perrhenate salts takes on the color of the cation.

== Preparation ==
Typical perrhenate salts are the alkali metal derivatives and ammonium perrhenate. These salts are prepared by oxidation of rhenium compounds with nitric acid followed by neutralization of the resulting perrhenic acid. Addition of tetrabutylammonium chloride to aqueous solutions of sodium perrhenate gives tetrabutylammonium perrhenate, which is soluble in organic solvents.

== Reactions of perrhenates ==
=== Basicity ===
Perrhenate anion is a weaker base than Cl^{−} or Br^{−} but stronger than ClO^{−}_{4} or BF^{−}_{4}. Silver perrhenate reacts with trimethylsilyl chloride to give the silyl "ester" (CH_{3})_{3}SiOReO_{3}.

=== Condensation ===
Perrhenate may undergo condensation with formation of small rhenium polyoxometalate Re_{4}O^{2−}_{15} where one central Re has octahedral oxygen coordination while 3 other are tetrahedral.

=== Reaction with sulfide ===
With sulfide sources such as hydrogen sulfide, ReO^{−}_{4} converts to tetrathioperrhenate anion ReS^{−}_{4}. An intermediate is [ReO_{3}S]^{−}.

=== Redox ===
Unlike permanganate, perrhenate is nonoxidising. However, replacement of some oxo ligands induces redox. The perrhenate ion reacts with cyanide to give trans-[ReO_{2}(CN)_{4}]^{3−}. Treatment of tetrabutylammonium perrhenate with trimethylsilyl chloride produces the oxychloride of Re(V):

Bu_{4}N[ReO_{4}] + 6 Me_{3}SiCl → Bu_{4}N[ReOCl_{4}] + 3 (Me_{3}Si)_{2}O + Cl_{2}

=== Complement to pertechnetate ===
The chemistry of the perrhenate ion is similar to that of the pertechnetate ion TcO^{−}_{4}. For this reason, perrhenate is sometimes used as a carrier for trace levels of pertechnetate, for instance in nuclear medicine scanning procedures. Perrhenate is also used as a safer alternative to pertechnetate for nuclear waste vitrification studies, such as volatility or encapsulation in solids.

== See also ==
- Permanganate
- Pertechnetate
