= Rhenium(VII) sulfide =

Names
- IUPAC name Rhenium(VII) sulfide

Identifiers
CAS Number	12038-67-4
3D model (JSmol)	Interactive image
ChemSpider	21171359
ECHA InfoCard	100.031.698
EC Number	234-882-5
PubChem CID	159414
UNII	K72K37878A
CompTox Dashboard (EPA)	DTXSID901022921
- InChI: InChI=1S/2Re.7S Key: CVHXCQNYOAKCMI-UHFFFAOYSA-N; InChI=1/2Re.7S/rRe2S7/c3-1(4,5)9-2(6,7)8 Key: CVHXCQNYOAKCMI-NEHFBHEFAV
- SMILES: S=[Re](=S)(=S)S[Re](=S)(=S)=S

Properties
Chemical formula	Re_{2}S_{7}
Molar mass	596.869 g/mol

Hazards
- GHS labelling
Pictograms	(GHS06: Toxic) (GHS07: Exclamation mark)
Signal word	Danger
Hazard statements	H301, H315, H319, H331, H412
Precautionary statements	P261, P264, P270, P271, P273, P280, P301+P310, P302+P352, P304+P340, P305+P351+P338, P311, P321, P330, P332+P313, P337+P313, P362, P403+P233, P405, P501
- Except where otherwise noted, data are given for materials in their standard state (at 25 °C [77 °F], 100 kPa). Infobox references

Rhenium(VII) sulfide is a chemical compound with the formula Re_{2}S_{7}. It has a complex structure, but can be synthesized from direct combination of the elements:
$$\ce{2Re{} + 7S ->[\Delta] Re2S7}$$
Alternatively, rhenium(VII) oxide reacts with hydrogen sulfide in 4N HCl to the same end:
$$\ce{Re2O7{} + 7H2S ->[\Delta] Re2S7{} + 7H2O}$$

The compound catalyses the reduction of nitric oxide to nitrous oxide and hydrogenation of double bonds. In this regard, it unusually tolerates sulfur compounds, which poison noble metal catalysts.

Rhenium(VII) sulfide decomposes when heated. In vacuum, it generates rhenium(IV) sulfide:

$$\mathrm{Re_2S_7 \ \xrightarrow{600^oC}\ 2ReS_2 + 3S }$$

In air, the sulfide oxidizes to sulfur dioxide:

$$\mathrm{2Re_2S_7 + 21O_2 \ \xrightarrow{\Delta}\ 2Re_2O_7 + 14SO_2 }$$
