= Sodium perrhenate =

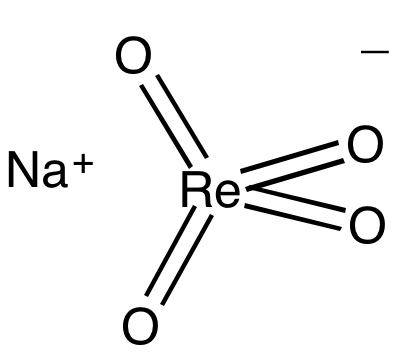

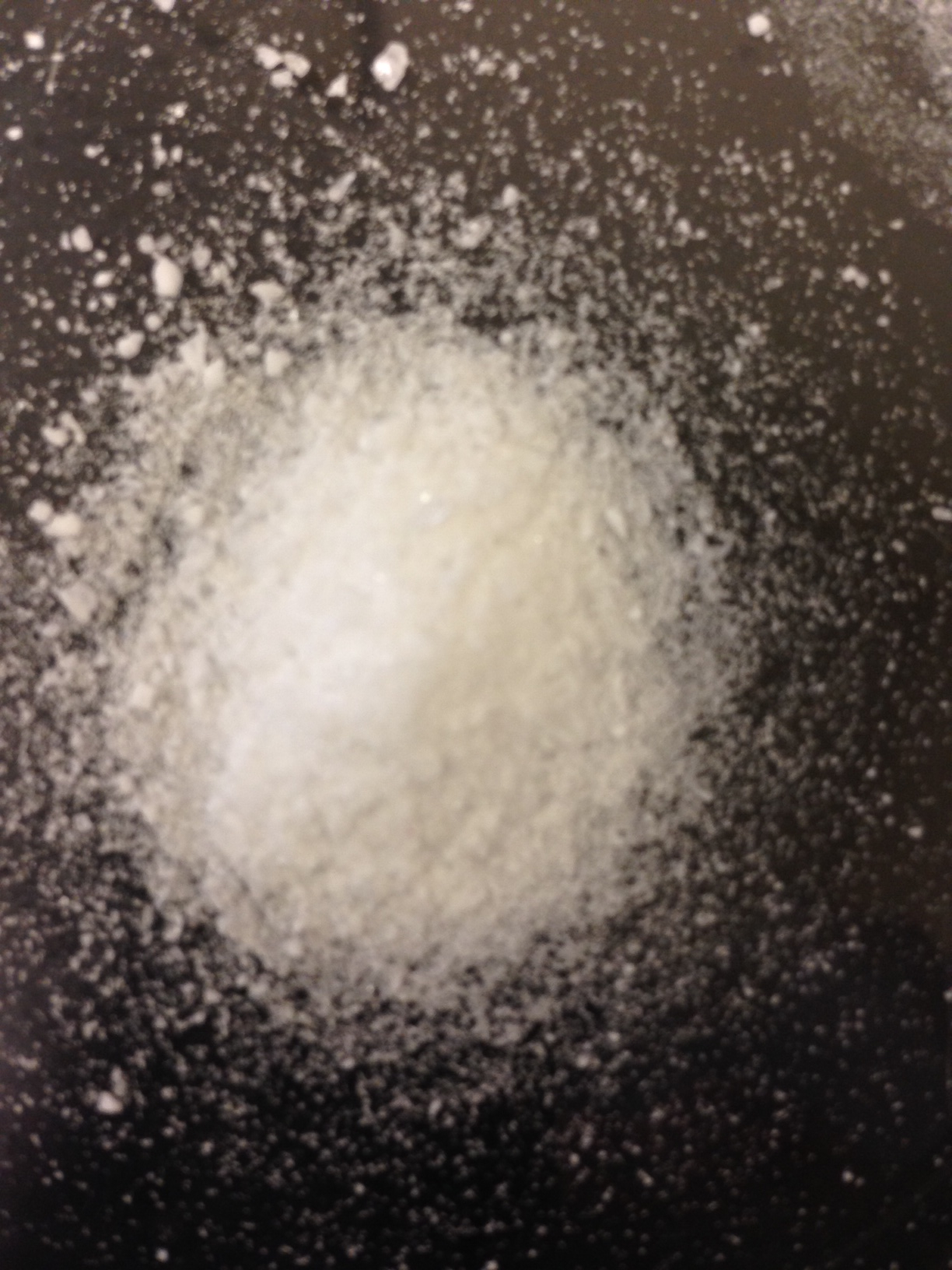

Names
- Other names Sodium rhenate(VII)

Identifiers
CAS Number	13472-33-8
3D model (JSmol)	Interactive image
ChEMBL	ChEMBL444819
ChemSpider	4282939
ECHA InfoCard	100.033.388
EC Number	236-742-9
PubChem CID	5107658
RTECS number	WD3675000
UNII	PE1T8NN47Q
CompTox Dashboard (EPA)	DTXSID60893935
- InChI: InChI=1S/Na.4O.Re/q+1;;;;-1; Key: KMISVFTVBOPTAI-UHFFFAOYSA-N
- SMILES: [O-][Re](=O)(=O)=O.[Na+]

Properties
Chemical formula	NaReO_{4}
Molar mass	273.1866 g/mol
Appearance	white solid
Density	5.39 g/cm^{3}
Melting point	414 °C (777 °F; 687 K)
Solubility in water	103.3 g/100 mL (0 °C); 114.0 g/100 mL (25 °C); 145.3 g/100 mL (30 °C); 173.0 g/100 mL (50 °C)
Solubility	soluble in water (> 1130 g/L at 25 °C)

Structure
Crystal structure	tetragonal

Hazards
- Occupational safety and health (OHS/OSH)
Main hazards	Oxidizer, skin/eyes irritation
- Except where otherwise noted, data are given for materials in their standard state (at 25 °C [77 °F], 100 kPa). verify (what is ?) Infobox references

Sodium perrhenate (also known as sodium rhenate(VII)) is the inorganic compound with the formula NaReO_{4}. It is a white salt that is soluble in water. It is a common precursor to other rhenium compounds. Its structure resembles that of sodium perchlorate and sodium permanganate.

== Preparation ==
It can be prepared by treatment of rhenium heptoxide with base or by ion exchange from the potassium salt.

Sodium perrhenate can be prepared from rhenium metal with hydrogen peroxide in the presence of base.

2 Re + 7 H_{2}O_{2} + 2 NaOH → 2 NaReO_{4} + 8 H_{2}O

== Reactions ==
It reacts with sodium in ethanol to give nonahydridorhenate.

Sodium perrhenate has been used as a precursor of rhenium nitrides (such as Re_{3}N, Re_{2}N, Re_{3}N_{2}, ReN_{2}, ReN_{3}, ReN_{4}), which can be used as catalysts for ammonia synthesis and for hydro-denitrogenation.

It can be used to prepare Re_{2}(CO)_{10}.
