= Methylrhenium trioxide =

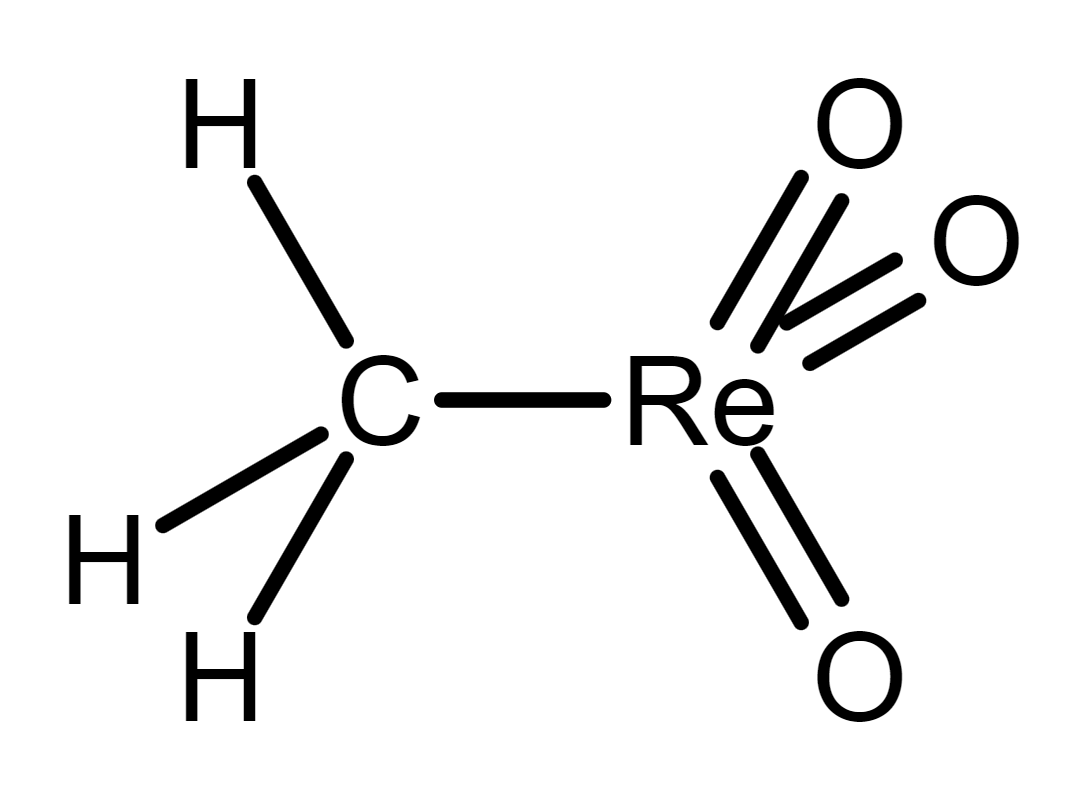

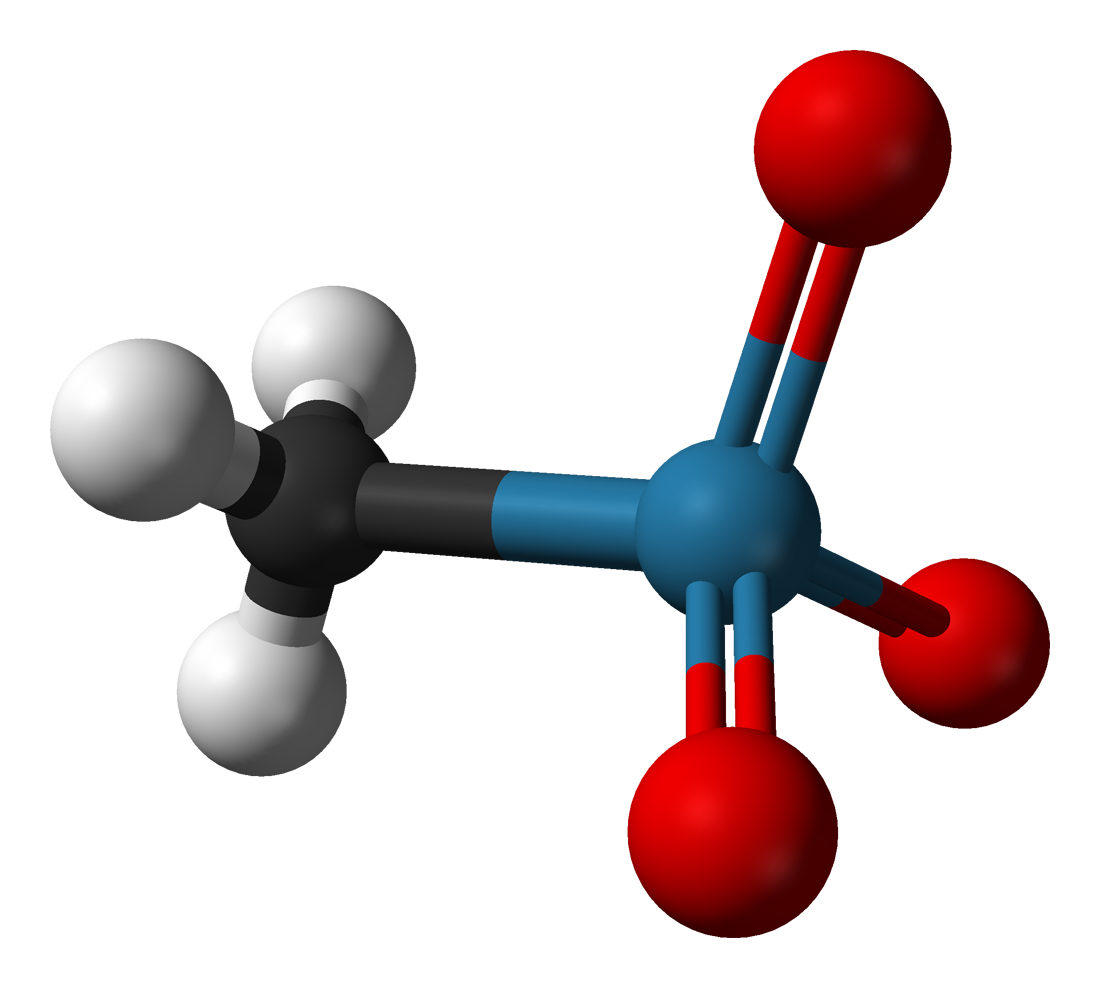

Names
- IUPAC name Methyl(trioxo)rhenium(VII)
- Other names Methyltrioxorhenium(VII)

Identifiers
| CAS Number | 70197-13-6 |
| 3D model (JSmol) | Interactive image |
| Abbreviations | MTO |
| ChemSpider | 10621726 |
| ECHA InfoCard | 100.202.821 |
| EC Number | 677-701-9 |
| PubChem CID | 2734010 |
| UNII | 883D8RDD5Q |
| CompTox Dashboard (EPA) | DTXSID40370077 |
- InChI: InChI=1S/CH3.3O.Re/h1H3;;;; Key: PQTLALPZRPFYIT-UHFFFAOYSA-N; InChI=1/CH3.3O.Re/h1H3;;;;/rCH3O3Re/c1-5(2,3)4/h1H3 Key: PQTLALPZRPFYIT-YHFCCQKIAF
- SMILES: C[Re](=O)(=O)=O

Properties
| Chemical formula | CH_{3}ReO_{3} |
| Molar mass | 249.239 g·mol^{−1} |
| Appearance | white powder |
| Melting point | 112 °C (234 °F; 385 K) |
| Solubility in water | highly soluble in water |

Hazards
- GHS labelling
| Pictograms | (GHS03: Oxidizing) (GHS07: Exclamation mark) |
| Signal word | Warning |
| Hazard statements | H272, H315, H319, H335, H413 |
| Precautionary statements | P210, P220, P221, P261, P264, P271, P273, P280, P302+P352, P304+P340, P305+P351+P338, P312, P321, P332+P313, P337+P313, P362, P370+P378, P403+P233, P405, P501 |
| Safety data sheet (SDS) | External MSDS |
- Except where otherwise noted, data are given for materials in their standard state (at 25 °C [77 °F], 100 kPa). verify (what is ?) Infobox references

Methylrhenium trioxide, also known as methyltrioxorhenium(VII), is an organometallic compound with the formula CH_{3}−ReO_{3}. It is a volatile, colourless solid that has been used as a catalyst in some laboratory experiments. This chemical substance adopts a tetrahedral molecular geometry with rhenium surrounded by one methyl and three oxo ligands. The oxidation state of rhenium is +7.

== Synthesis ==
Methylrhenium trioxide is commercially available. It can be prepared by many routes, a typical method is the reaction of rhenium heptoxide and tetramethyltin:

Re_{2}O_{7} + (CH_{3})_{4}Sn → CH_{3}ReO_{3} + (CH_{3})_{3}Sn−O−ReO_{3}

Analogous alkyl and aryl derivatives are known. Compounds of the type R−ReO_{3} are Lewis acids, forming both 1:1 and 1:2 adducts with halides and amines.

== Uses ==
Methylrhenium trioxide serves as a heterogeneous catalyst for a variety of transformations. Supported on alumina/silica, it catalyzes olefin metathesis at 25 °C.

In solution, methylrhenium trioxide catalyses for the oxidations with hydrogen peroxide. Terminal alkynes yield the corresponding carboxylic acid or ester, internal alkynes yield diketones, and alkenes give epoxides. Methylrhenium trioxide also catalyses the conversion of aldehydes and diazoalkanes into an alkene, and the oxidation of amines to N-oxides with sodium percarbonate.
