= Rhenium tetraiodide =

Names
- Other names Rhenium(IV) iodide, tetraiodorhenium

Identifiers
CAS Number	59301-47-2
3D model (JSmol)	Interactive image
ChemSpider	77349697
PubChem CID	13159444
- InChI: InChI=1S/4HI.Re/h4*1H;/q;;;;+4/p-4 Key: KGKLLWHEYDUTBF-UHFFFAOYSA-J
- SMILES: I[Re](I)(I)I

Properties
Chemical formula	I_{4}Re
Molar mass	693.825 g·mol^{−1}
Appearance	black solid
Density	g/cm^{3}
Solubility in water	reacts with water

Related compounds
Related compounds	Iridium tetraiodide
- Except where otherwise noted, data are given for materials in their standard state (at 25 °C [77 °F], 100 kPa). Infobox references

Rhenium tetraiodide is a binary chemical compound of rhenium and iodide with the chemical formula ReI_{4}.

== Synthesis ==
Rhenium tetraiodide can be obtained via the reduction of perrhenic acid with hydrogen iodide:

2HReO_{4} + 14HI_{4} → 2ReI_{4} + 3I_{2} + 8H_{2}O

== Physical properties ==
Rhenium tetraiodide forms black solid substance which is soluble in acetone and ether. Hydrolyzed by water, hygroscopic.

== Chemical properties ==
Rhenium tetraiodide is hydrolyzed by water:

ReI_{4} + 2H_{2}O → ReO_{2} + 4HI

Rhenium tetraiodide decomposes when heated:

ReI_{4} → ReI_{3}, ReI_{2}, ReI, I_{2}
