= Potassium perrhenate =

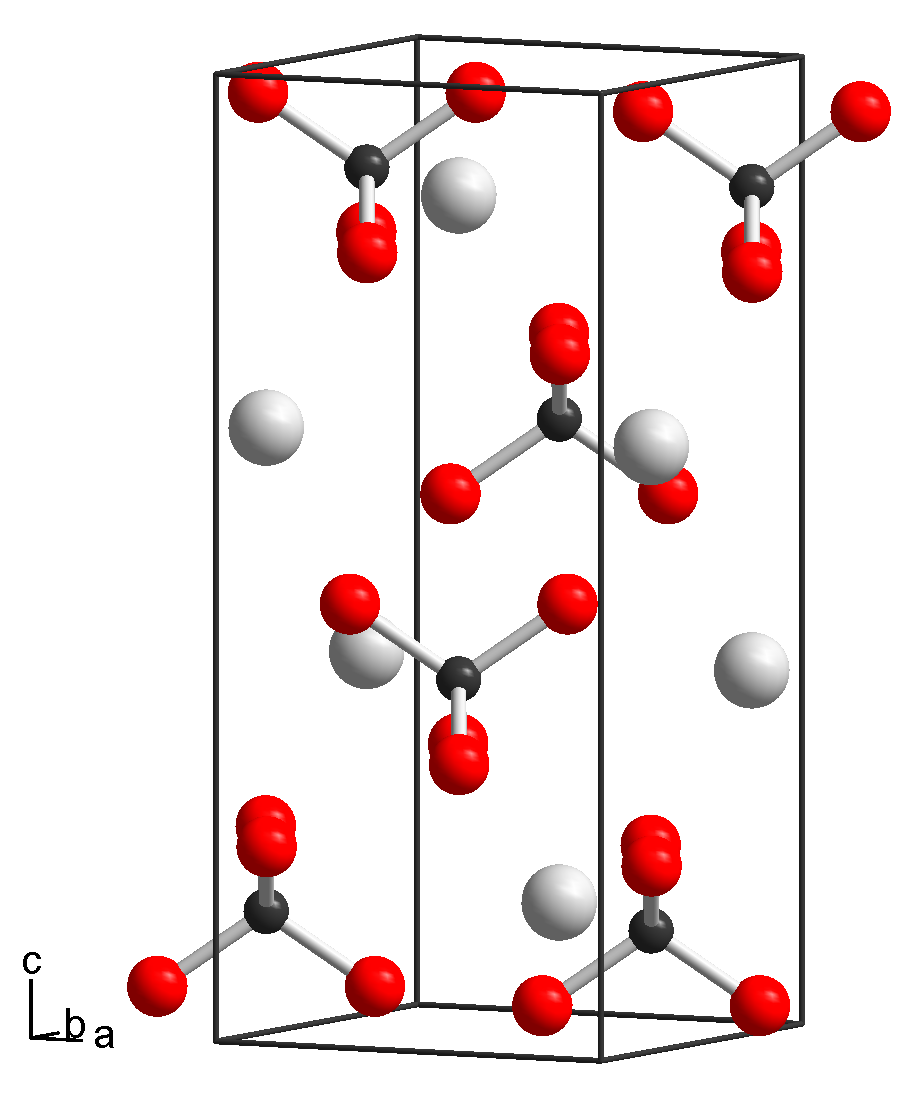

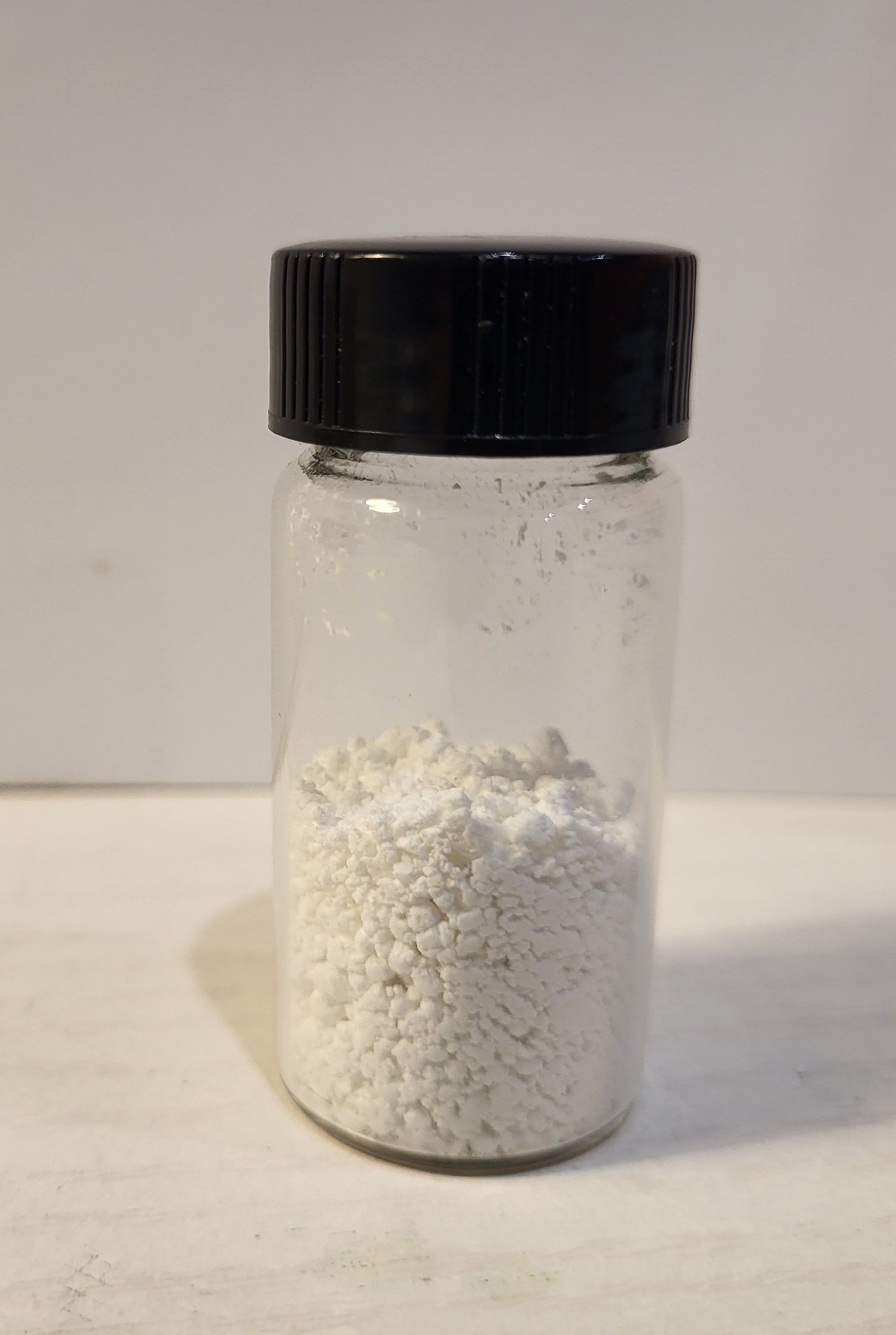

Identifiers
CAS Number	10466-65-6
3D model (JSmol)	Interactive image
ChemSpider	2894851
ECHA InfoCard	100.030.854
EC Number	233-953-8
PubChem CID	3661560
- InChI: InChI=1S/K.4O.Re/q+1;;;;-1; Key: QFKRWIFGDGKWLM-UHFFFAOYSA-N
- SMILES: [K+].[O-][Re](=O)(=O)=O

Properties
Chemical formula	KReO_{4}
Appearance	white solid
Density	5.39 g·cm^{−3}
Melting point	555 °C (1,031 °F; 828 K)
Boiling point	1,370 °C (2,500 °F; 1,640 K)
Solubility in water	11.9 g·l^{−1}
Refractive index (n_{D})	1.643 (20 °C)

Hazards
- GHS labelling
Pictograms	(GHS03: Oxidizing) (GHS07: Exclamation mark)
Signal word	Warning
Hazard statements	H272, H315, H319, H335
Precautionary statements	P210, P220, P261, P264, P264+P265, P271, P280, P302+P352, P304+P340, P305+P351+P338, P319, P321, P332+P317, P337+P317, P362+P364, P370+P378, P403+P233, P405, P501
- Except where otherwise noted, data are given for materials in their standard state (at 25 °C [77 °F], 100 kPa). Infobox references

Potassium perrhenate is an inorganic compound with the chemical formula KReO_{4}.

== Preparation ==
Potassium perrhenate can be produced by the neutralization of potassium hydroxide and perrhenic acid.

$$\mathrm{KOH + HReO_4 \longrightarrow KReO_4  + H_2O}$$

== Properties ==
Potassium perrhenate is a white solid that is sparingly soluble in water and ethanol. It have a tetragonal crystal system with the space group I4_{1}/a (No. 88), and lattice constants a = 567.4 pm and c = 1266.8 pm. It is a strong oxidizer.
