= Rhenium(IV) oxide =

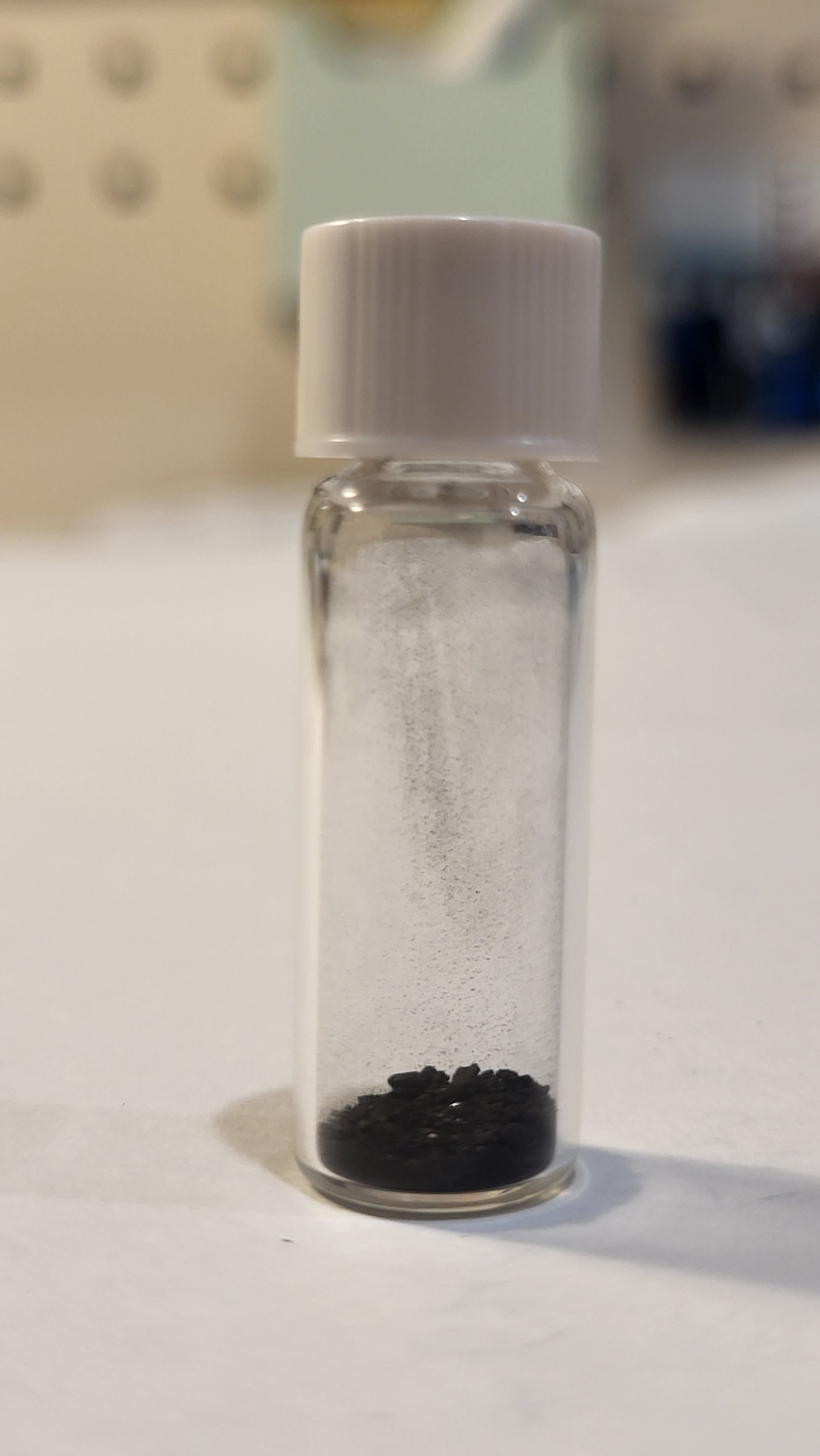

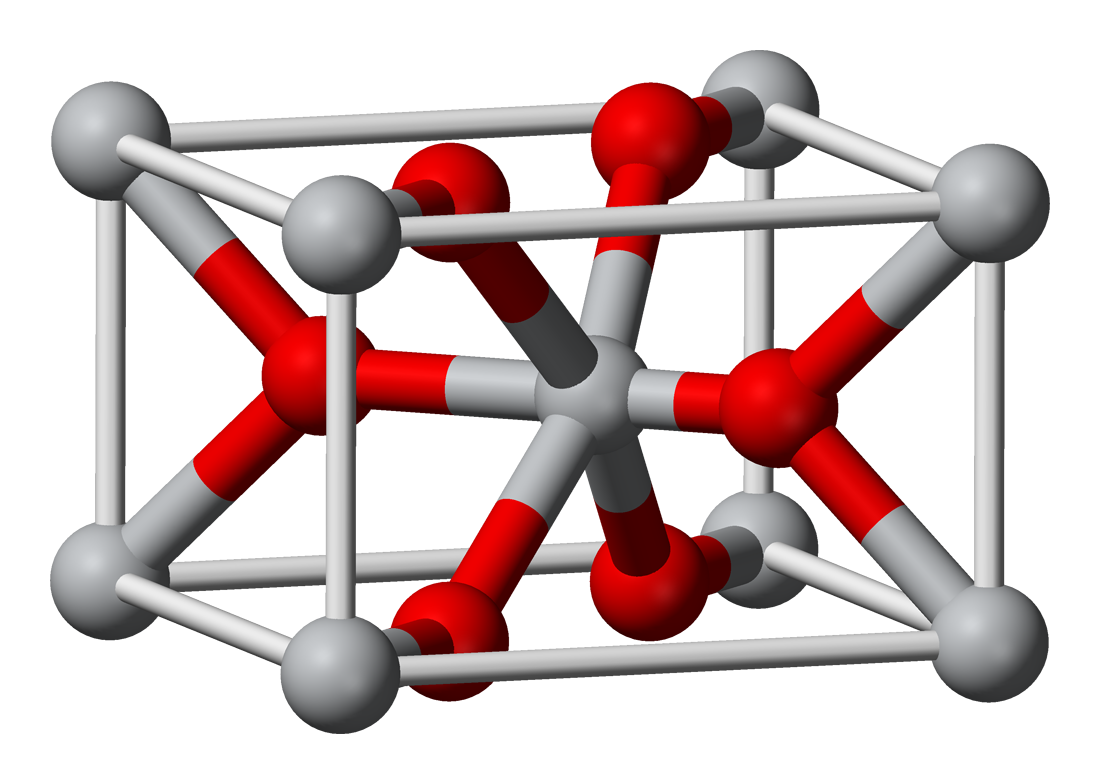
- Re O

Names
- IUPAC name Rhenium(IV) oxide
- Other names Rhenium dioxide

Identifiers
CAS Number	12036-09-8
3D model (JSmol)	Interactive image
ChemSpider	13242808
ECHA InfoCard	100.031.659
EC Number	234-839-0
PubChem CID	82847
CompTox Dashboard (EPA)	DTXSID5065192
- InChI: InChI=1S/2O.Re
- SMILES: O=[Re]=O

Properties
Chemical formula	ReO_{2}
Molar mass	218.206 g/mol
Appearance	gray orthorhombic crystals
Density	11.4 g/cm^{3}
Melting point	decomposes at 1,000 °C
Solubility in water	insoluble
Solubility in alkali	insoluble
Magnetic susceptibility (χ)	+44.0·10^{−6} cm^{3}/mol

Structure
Crystal structure	Orthorohmbic, oP12
Space group	Pbcn, No. 60

Hazards
NFPA 704 (fire diamond)	1 0 0
Safety data sheet (SDS)	Aldrich MSDS

Related compounds
Other anions	Rhenium(VII) oxide Rhenium(III) oxide Rhenium(III) chloride
Other cations	manganese(IV) oxide Technetium(IV) oxide
- Except where otherwise noted, data are given for materials in their standard state (at 25 °C [77 °F], 100 kPa). verify (what is ?) Infobox references

Rhenium(IV) oxide or rhenium dioxide is the inorganic compound with the formula ReO_{2}. This gray to black crystalline solid is a laboratory reagent that can be used as a catalyst. It adopts the rutile structure.

== Synthesis and reactions ==
It forms via comproportionation:

2 Re_{2}O_{7} + 3 Re → 7 ReO_{2}

Single crystals are obtained by chemical transport, using iodine as the transporting agent.:

ReO_{2} + I_{2} ⇌ ReO_{2}I_{2}

At high temperatures it undergoes disproportionation:

7 ReO_{2} → 2 Re_{2}O_{7} + 3 Re

It forms rhenates with alkaline hydrogen peroxide and oxidizing acids. In molten sodium hydroxide it forms sodium rhenate:

2 NaOH + ReO_{2} → Na_{2}ReO_{3} + H_{2}O
