= Perrhenic acid =

Chemical compound

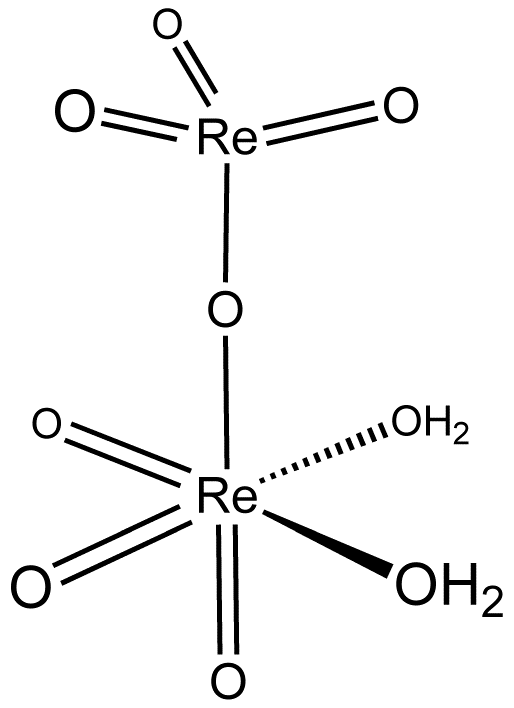
- Perrhenic acid

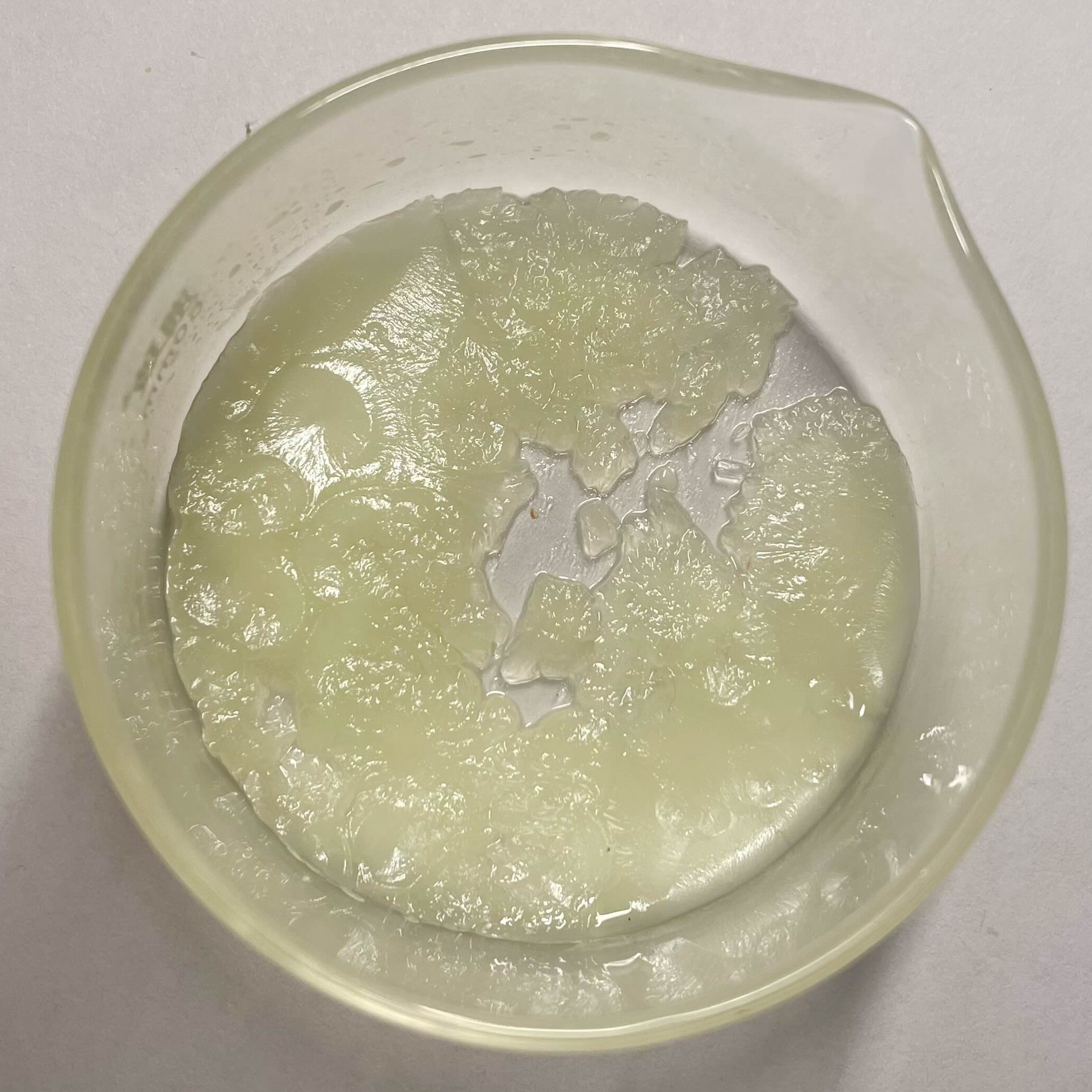
- Monohydrate

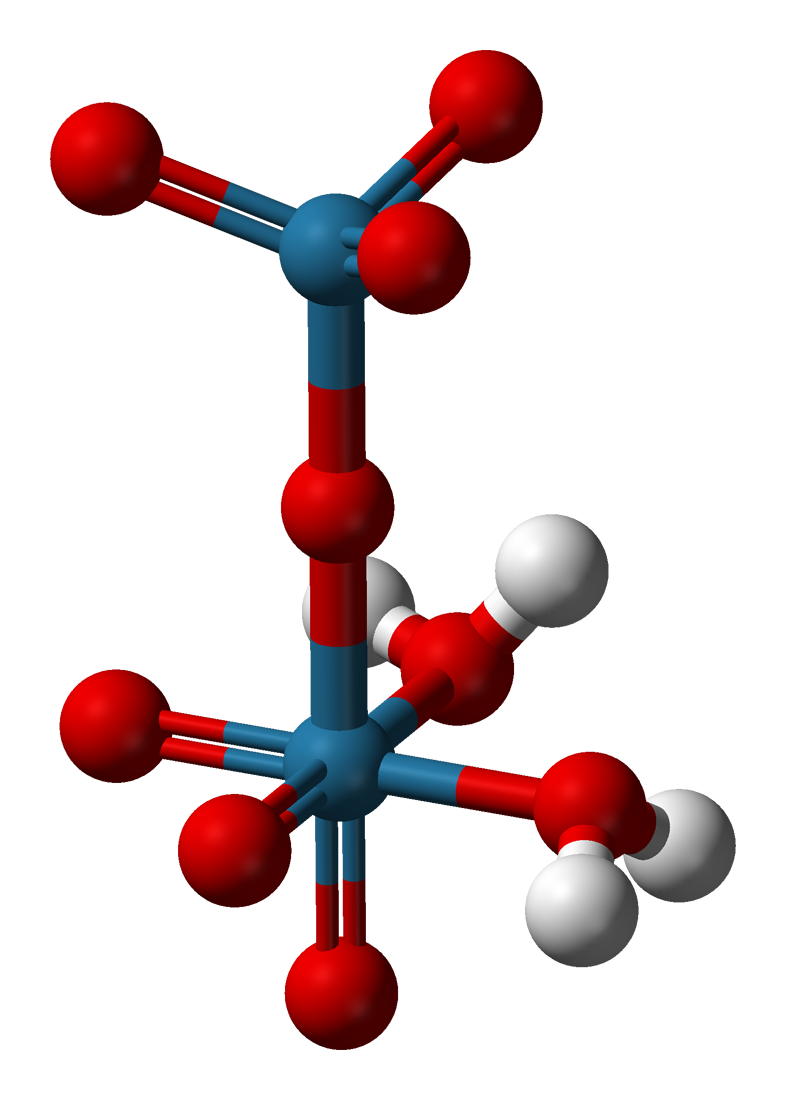

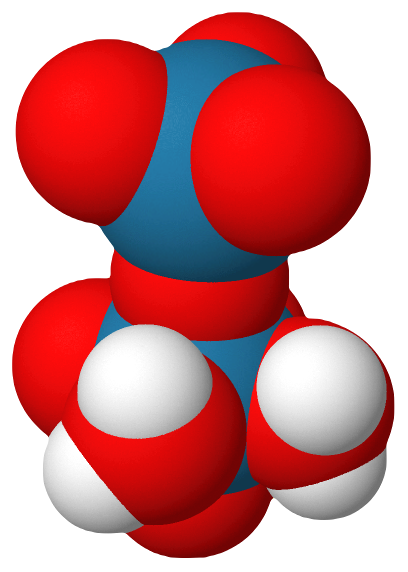

Names
- IUPAC name Perrhenic acid
- Systematic IUPAC name [Diaquatrioxidorhenium(VII)]-μ-oxido-[trioxidorhenium(VII)]
- Other names Hydrated rhenium(VII) oxide

Identifiers
| CAS Number | 13768-11-1 |
| 3D model (JSmol) | aqueous: Interactive image; gaseous: Interactive image |
| ChemSpider | 21106462 |
| ECHA InfoCard | 100.033.968 |
| EC Number | 237-380-4 |
| PubChem CID | 83718 |
| RTECS number | TT4550000 |
| CompTox Dashboard (EPA) | DTXSID80894065 |
- InChI: InChI=1S/2H2O.7O.2Re/h2*1H2;;;;;;;;; Key: JOTGKJVGIIKFIQ-UHFFFAOYSA-N; InChI=1/2H2O.7O.2Re/h2*1H2;;;;;;;;;/rH4O9Re2/c1-10(2,3)9-11(4,5,6,7)8/h4-5H2 Key: JOTGKJVGIIKFIQ-SEUCOXMMAB
- SMILES: aqueous: [OH2+][Re-2](=O)(=O)(=O)([OH2+])O[Re](=O)(=O)=O; gaseous: O=[Re](=O)(=O)O

Properties
| Chemical formula | H_{4}Re_{2}O_{9} (solid); HReO_{4} (gas) |
| Molar mass | 251.2055 g/mol |
| Appearance | Pale yellow solid |
| Boiling point | sublimes |
| Solubility in water | Soluble |
| Acidity (pK_{a}) | −1.25 |
| Conjugate base | Perrhenate |

Structure
| Coordination geometry | octahedral-tetrahedral (solid) tetrahedral (gas) |

Hazards
- Occupational safety and health (OHS/OSH)
| Main hazards | Corrosive |
- GHS labelling
| Pictograms | (GHS05: Corrosive) (GHS07: Exclamation mark) |
| Signal word | Danger |
| Hazard statements | H302, H314, H332 |
| Precautionary statements | P260, P264, P270, P271, P280, P301+P312, P301+P330+P331, P303+P361+P353, P304+P312, P304+P340, P305+P351+P338, P310, P312, P321, P330, P363, P405, P501 |
| NFPA 704 (fire diamond) | 3 |
| Flash point | Non-flammable |

Related compounds
| Related compounds | Perrhenate; Manganese(VII) oxide; Technetium(VII) oxide; Rhenium(VII) oxide; Permanganic acid; Pertechnetic acid; Perchloric acid |
- Except where otherwise noted, data are given for materials in their standard state (at 25 °C [77 °F], 100 kPa). verify (what is ?) Infobox references

Perrhenic acid is the chemical compound with the formula Re_{2}O_{7}(H_{2}O)_{2}. It is obtained by evaporating aqueous solutions of Re_{2}O_{7}. Conventionally, perrhenic acid is considered to have the formula HReO_{4}, and a species of this formula forms when rhenium(VII) oxide sublimes in the presence of water or steam. When a solution of Re_{2}O_{7} is kept for a period of months, it breaks down and crystals of HReO_{4}·H_{2}O are formed, which contain tetrahedral ReO^{−}_{4}. For most purposes, perrhenic acid and rhenium(VII) oxide are used interchangeably. Rhenium can be dissolved in nitric or concentrated sulfuric acid to produce perrhenic acid.

== Properties ==
The structure of solid perrhenic acid is [O_{3}Re−O−ReO_{3}(H_{2}O)_{2}]. This species is a rare example of a metal oxide coordinated to water; most often metal–oxo–aquo species are unstable with respect to their corresponding hydroxides:

M(O)(H_{2}O) → M(OH)_{2}

The two rhenium atoms have different bonding geometries, with one being tetrahedral and the other octahedral, and with the water ligands coordinated to the latter.

Gaseous perrhenic acid is tetrahedral, as suggested by its formula HReO_{4}.

== Reactions ==
Perrhenic acid or the related anhydrous oxide Re_{2}O_{7} converts to dirhenium heptasulfide upon treatment with hydrogen sulfide:

Re_{2}O_{7} + 7 H_{2}S → Re_{2}S_{7} + 7 H_{2}O

The heptasulfide catalyzes various reductions.

Perrhenic acid in the presence of hydrochloric acid undergoes reduction in the presence of thioethers and tertiary phosphines to give rhenium(V) complexes with the formula ReOCl_{3}L_{2}.

Perrhenic acid combined with platinum on a support gives rise to a useful hydrogenation and hydrocracking catalyst for the petroleum industry. For example, silica impregnated with a solution of perrhenic acid is reduced with hydrogen at 500 °C. This catalyst is used in the dehydrogenation of alcohols and also promotes the decomposition of ammonia.

=== Catalysis ===
Perrhenic acid is a precursor to a variety of homogeneous catalysts, some of which are promising in niche applications that can justify the high cost of rhenium. In combination with tertiary arsines, perrhenic acid gives a catalyst for the epoxidation of alkenes with hydrogen peroxide. Perrhenic acid catalyses the dehydration of oximes to nitriles.

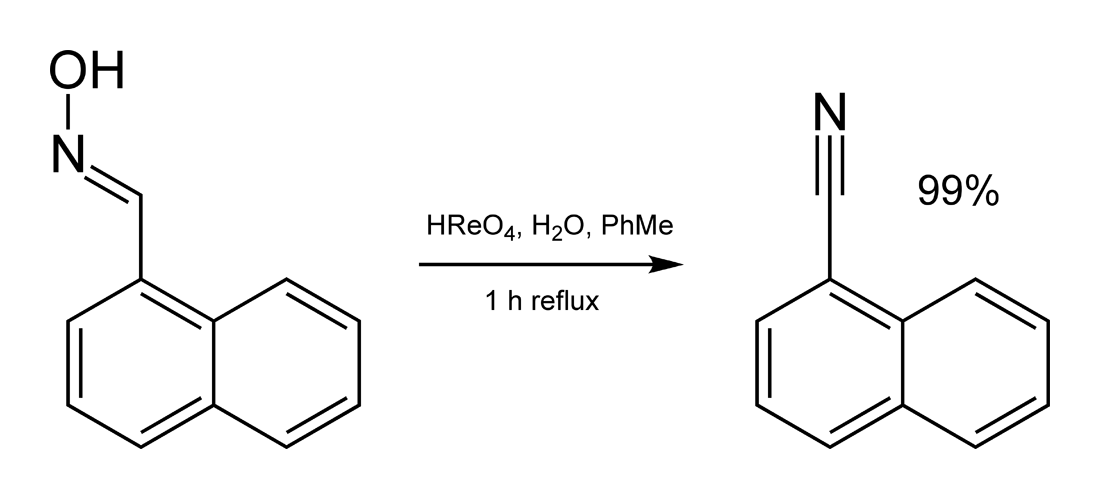

== Other uses ==
Perrhenic acid is also used in the manufacture of x-ray targets.

== See also ==
- Perrhenate
- Rhenium(VII) oxide
