= Rhenium(VII) oxide =

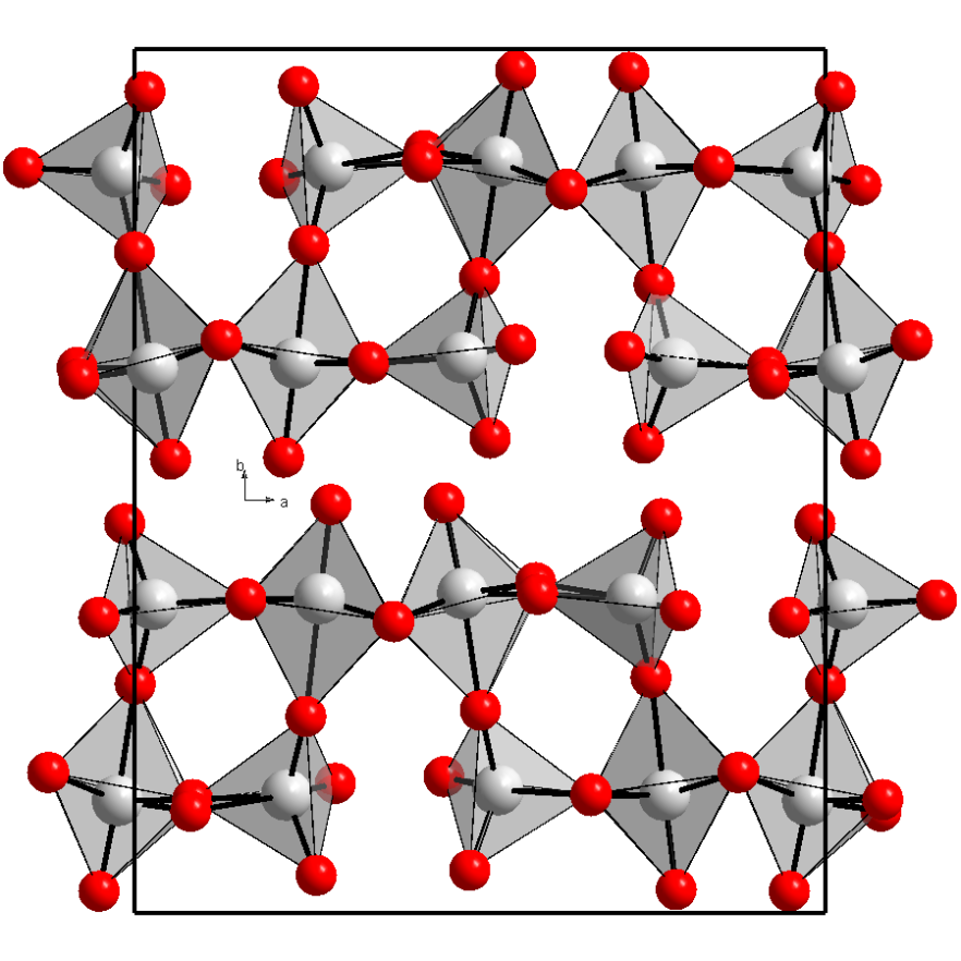
- Rhenium(VII) oxide

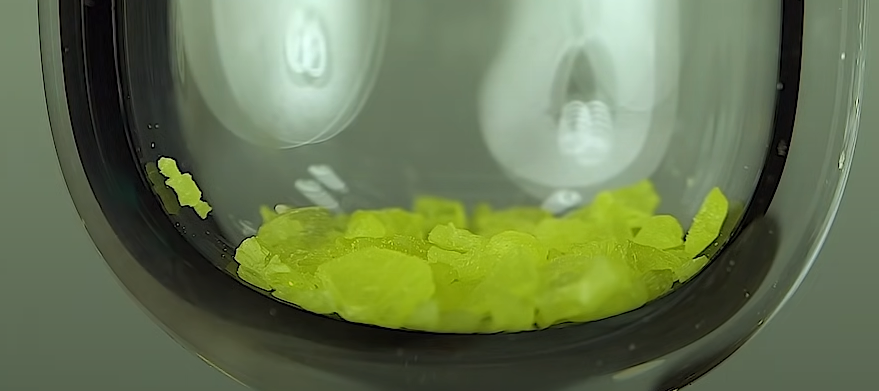

Names
- Other names Rhenium heptoxide

Identifiers
| CAS Number | 1314-68-7 |
| 3D model (JSmol) | Interactive image |
| ChemSpider | 109723 |
| ECHA InfoCard | 100.013.857 |
| EC Number | 215-241-9 |
| PubChem CID | 123106 |
| UNII | 0DJ421156F |
| CompTox Dashboard (EPA) | DTXSID00894901 |
- InChI: InChI=1S/7O.2Re Key: NBGOSNNAAHDRLK-UHFFFAOYSA-N
- SMILES: O=[Re](=O)(=O)O[Re](=O)(=O)=O

Properties
| Chemical formula | Re_{2}O_{7} |
| Molar mass | 484.40298 g/mol |
| Appearance | yellow crystalline powder |
| Density | 6.103 g/cm^{3}, solid |
| Melting point | 360 °C (680 °F; 633 K) |
| Boiling point | sublime |
| Solubility in water | Hydrolyses |

Hazards
- GHS labelling
| Pictograms | (GHS05: Corrosive) |
| Signal word | Danger |
| Hazard statements | H314 |
| Precautionary statements | P260, P264, P280, P301+P330+P331, P303+P361+P353, P304+P340, P305+P351+P338, P310, P321, P363, P405, P501 |

Related compounds
| Related compounds | Manganese(VII) oxide; technetium(VII) oxide; perrhenic acid |
- Except where otherwise noted, data are given for materials in their standard state (at 25 °C [77 °F], 100 kPa). verify (what is ?) Infobox references

Rhenium(VII) oxide is the inorganic compound with the formula Re_{2}O_{7}. Perrhenic acid, Re_{2}O_{7}·2H_{2}O, is closely related to Re_{2}O_{7}. Re_{2}O_{7} is the raw material for all rhenium compounds, being the volatile fraction obtained upon roasting the host ore.

== Structure ==
Solid Re_{2}O_{7} consists of alternating octahedral and tetrahedral Re centres. Upon heating, the polymer cracks to give molecular (nonpolymeric) Re_{2}O_{7}. This molecular species closely resembles manganese heptoxide, consisting of a pair of ReO_{4} tetrahedra that share a vertex, i.e., O_{3}Re–O–ReO_{3}.

== Synthesis and reactions ==
Rhenium(VII) oxide is formed when metallic rhenium or its oxides or sulfides are oxidized at 500–700 °C (900–1,300 °F) in air.

Re_{2}O_{7} dissolves in water to give perrhenic acid.

Heating Re_{2}O_{7} gives rhenium dioxide, a reaction signalled by the appearance of the dark blue coloration:

2Re_{2}O_{7} → 4ReO_{2} + 3O_{2}

Using tetramethyltin, it converts to methylrhenium trioxide ("MTO"), a catalyst for oxidations:

Re_{2}O_{7} + 2Sn(CH_{3})_{4} → CH_{3}ReO_{3} + (CH_{3})_{3}SnOReO_{3}

In a related reaction, it reacts with hexamethyldisiloxane to give the siloxide:

Re_{2}O_{7} + 2O(Si(CH_{3})_{3})_{2} → 2(CH_{3})_{3}SiOReO_{3}

== Uses ==
=== Hydrogenation catalyst ===
Rhenium(VII) oxide finds some use in organic synthesis as a catalyst for ethenolysis, carbonyl reduction and amide reduction.
