= Technetium compounds =

Chemical compounds containing technetium

Technetium compounds are chemical compounds containing the chemical element technetium. Technetium can form multiple oxidation states, but often forms in the +4 and +7 oxidation states. Because technetium is radioactive, technetium compounds are extremely rare on Earth.

== Pertechnetate and derivatives ==
Pertechnetate is one of the most available forms of technetium. It is structurally related to permanganate.

The most prevalent form of technetium that is easily accessible is sodium pertechnetate, Na[TcO_{4}]. The majority of this material is produced by radioactive decay from [^{99}MoO_{4}]^{2−}:

[^{99}MoO_{4}]^{2−} → [^{99m}TcO_{4}]^{−} + e^{−}

Pertechnetate (tetroxidotechnetate) TcO^{−}_{4} behaves analogously to perchlorate, both of which are tetrahedral. Unlike permanganate (MnO^{−}_{4}), it is only a weak oxidizing agent.

Related to pertechnetate is technetium heptoxide. This pale-yellow, volatile solid is produced by oxidation of Tc metal and related precursors:

4 Tc + 7 O_{2} → 2 Tc_{2}O_{7}

It is a molecular metal oxide, analogous to manganese heptoxide. It adopts a centrosymmetric structure with two types of Tc−O bonds with 167 and 184 pm bond lengths.

Technetium heptoxide hydrolyzes to pertechnetate and pertechnetic acid, depending on the pH:

Tc_{2}O_{7} + 2 OH^{−} → 2 TcO_{4}^{−} + H_{2}O
Tc_{2}O_{7} + H_{2}O → 2 HTcO_{4}

HTcO_{4} is a strong acid. In concentrated sulfuric acid, [TcO_{4}]^{−} converts to the octahedral form TcO_{3}(OH)(H_{2}O)_{2}, the conjugate base of the hypothetical triaquo complex [TcO_{3}(H_{2}O)_{3}]^{+}.

== Other chalcogenide derivatives ==
Technetium forms a dioxide, disulfide, diselenide, and ditelluride. An ill-defined Tc_{2}S_{7} forms upon treating pertechnetate with hydrogen sulfide. It thermally decomposes into disulfide and elemental sulfur. Similarly the dioxide can be produced by reduction of the Tc_{2}O_{7}.

Unlike the case for rhenium, a trioxide has not been isolated for technetium. However, TcO_{3} has been identified in the gas phase using mass spectrometry.

== Simple hydride and halide complexes ==
Technetium forms the simple complex TcH^{2−}_{9}. The potassium salt is isostructural with ReH^{2−}_{9}.

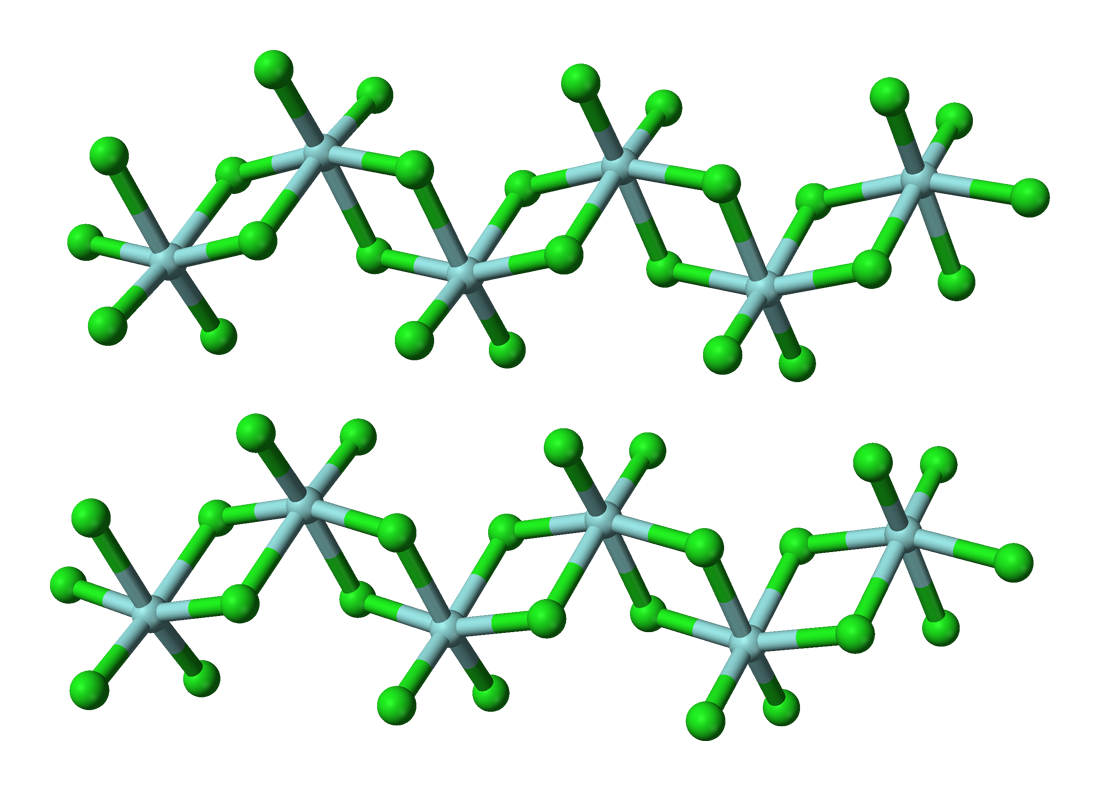
TcCl_{4} forms chain-like structures, similar to the behavior of several other metal tetrachlorides.

The following binary (containing only two elements) technetium halides are known: TcF_{6}, TcF_{5}, TcCl_{4}, TcBr_{4}, TcBr_{3}, α-TcCl_{3}, β-TcCl_{3}, TcI_{3}, α-TcCl_{2}, and β-TcCl_{2}. The oxidation states range from Tc(VI) to Tc(II). Technetium halides exhibit different structure types, such as molecular octahedral complexes, extended chains, layered sheets, and metal clusters arranged in a three-dimensional network. These compounds are produced by combining the metal and halogen or by less direct reactions.

TcCl_{4} is obtained by chlorination of Tc metal or Tc_{2}O_{7} Upon heating, TcCl_{4} gives the corresponding Tc(III) and Tc(II) chlorides.

TcCl_{4} → α-TcCl_{3} + 1/2 Cl_{2}
TcCl_{3} → β-TcCl_{2} + 1/2 Cl_{2}

The structure of TcCl_{4} is composed of infinite zigzag chains of edge-sharing TcCl_{6} octahedra. It is isomorphous to transition metal tetrachlorides of zirconium, hafnium, and platinum.

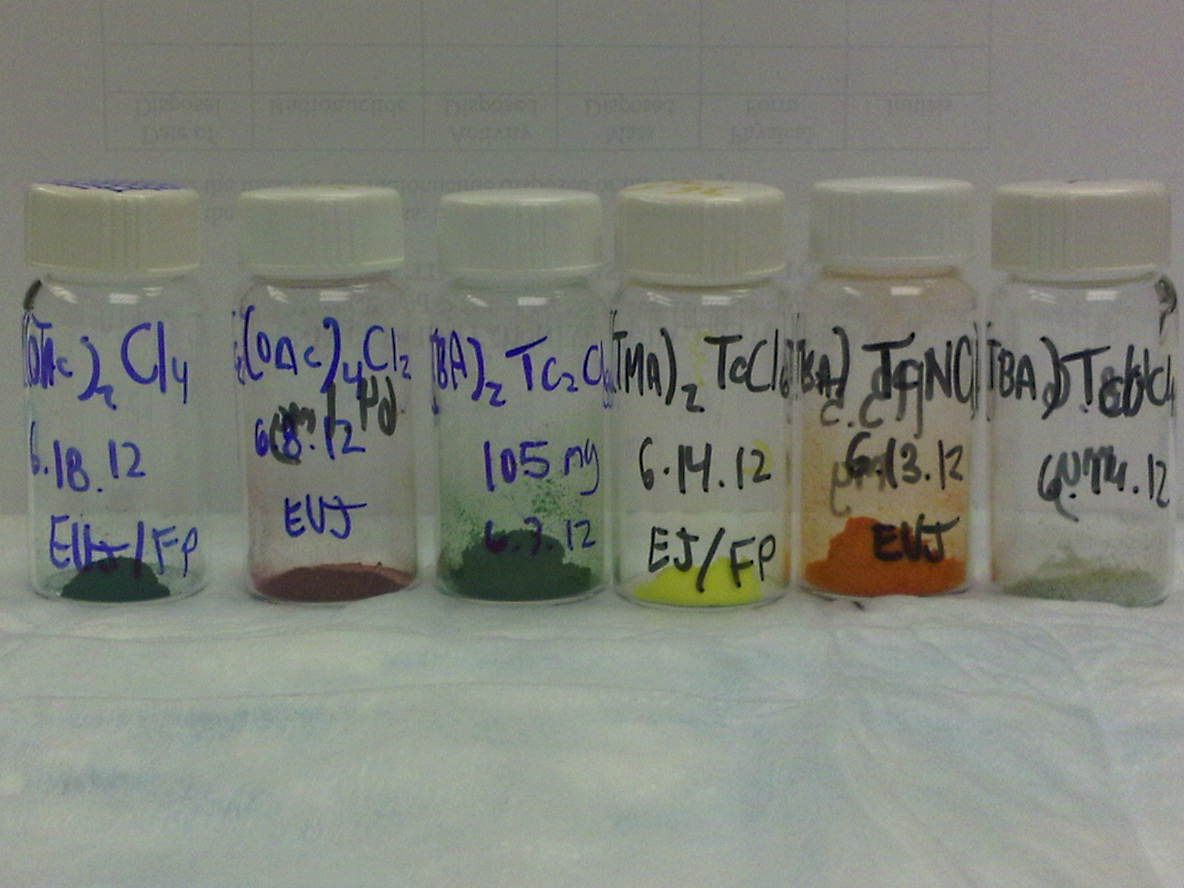
Chloro-containing coordination complexes of technetium (^{99}Tc) in various oxidation states: Tc(III), Tc(IV), Tc(V), and Tc(VI) represented.

Two polymorphs of technetium trichloride exist, α- and β-TcCl_{3}. The α polymorph is also denoted as Tc_{3}Cl_{9}. It adopts a confacial bioctahedral structure. It is prepared by treating the chloro-acetate Tc_{2}(O_{2}CCH_{3})_{4}Cl_{2} with HCl. Like Re_{3}Cl_{9}, the structure of the α-polymorph consists of triangles with short M-M distances. β-TcCl_{3} features octahedral Tc centers, which are organized in pairs, as seen also for molybdenum trichloride. TcBr_{3} does not adopt the structure of either trichloride phase. Instead it has the structure of molybdenum tribromide, consisting of chains of confacial octahedra with alternating short and long Tc—Tc contacts. TcI_{3} has the same structure as the high temperature phase of TiI_{3}, featuring chains of confacial octahedra with equal Tc—Tc contacts.

Several anionic technetium halides are known. The binary tetrahalides can be converted to the hexahalides [TcX_{6}]^{2−} (X = F, Cl, Br, I), which adopt octahedral molecular geometry. More reduced halides form anionic clusters with Tc–Tc bonds. The situation is similar for the related elements of Mo, W, Re. These clusters have the nuclearity Tc_{4}, Tc_{6}, Tc_{8}, and Tc_{13}. The more stable Tc_{6} and Tc_{8} clusters have prism shapes where vertical pairs of Tc atoms are connected by triple bonds and the planar atoms by single bonds. Every technetium atom makes six bonds, and the remaining valence electrons can be saturated by one axial and two bridging ligand halogen atoms such as chlorine or bromine.

== Simple carbide complexes ==
Technetium forms the simple carbon insertion phases with low carbon content up to 17 at.% of C when reacted with graphite or by thermolysis of organic pertechnetates. Tc is considered to be the last d-element to have some low but notable affinity to carbon.

== Coordination and organometallic complexes ==
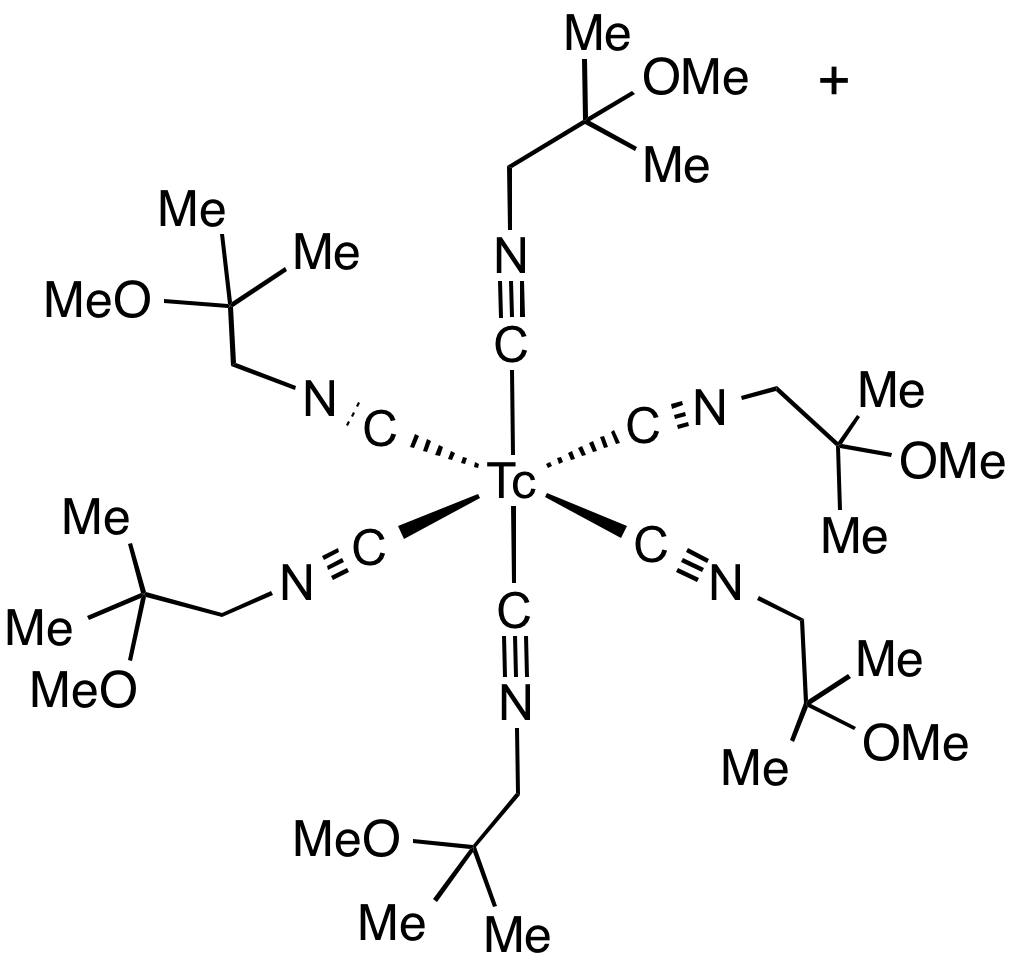
[[Technetium (^{99m}Tc) sestamibi]] ("Cardiolite") is widely used for imaging of the heart.

Technetium forms a variety of coordination complexes with organic ligands. Many have been well-investigated because of their relevance to nuclear medicine.

Technetium forms a variety of compounds with Tc–C bonds, i.e. organotechnetium complexes. Prominent members of this class are complexes with CO, arene, and cyclopentadienyl ligands. The binary carbonyl Tc_{2}(CO)_{10} is a white volatile solid. In this molecule, two technetium atoms are bound to each other; each atom is surrounded by octahedra of five carbonyl ligands. The bond length between technetium atoms, 303 pm, is significantly larger than the distance between two atoms in metallic technetium (272 pm). Similar carbonyls are formed by technetium's congeners, manganese and rhenium. Interest in organotechnetium compounds has also been motivated by applications in nuclear medicine. Technetium also forms aquo-carbonyl complexes, one prominent complex being [Tc(CO)_{3}(H_{2}O)_{3}]^{+}, which are unusual compared to other metal carbonyls.

== See also ==
- Molybdenum compounds
- Manganese
