= Caesium pertechnetate =

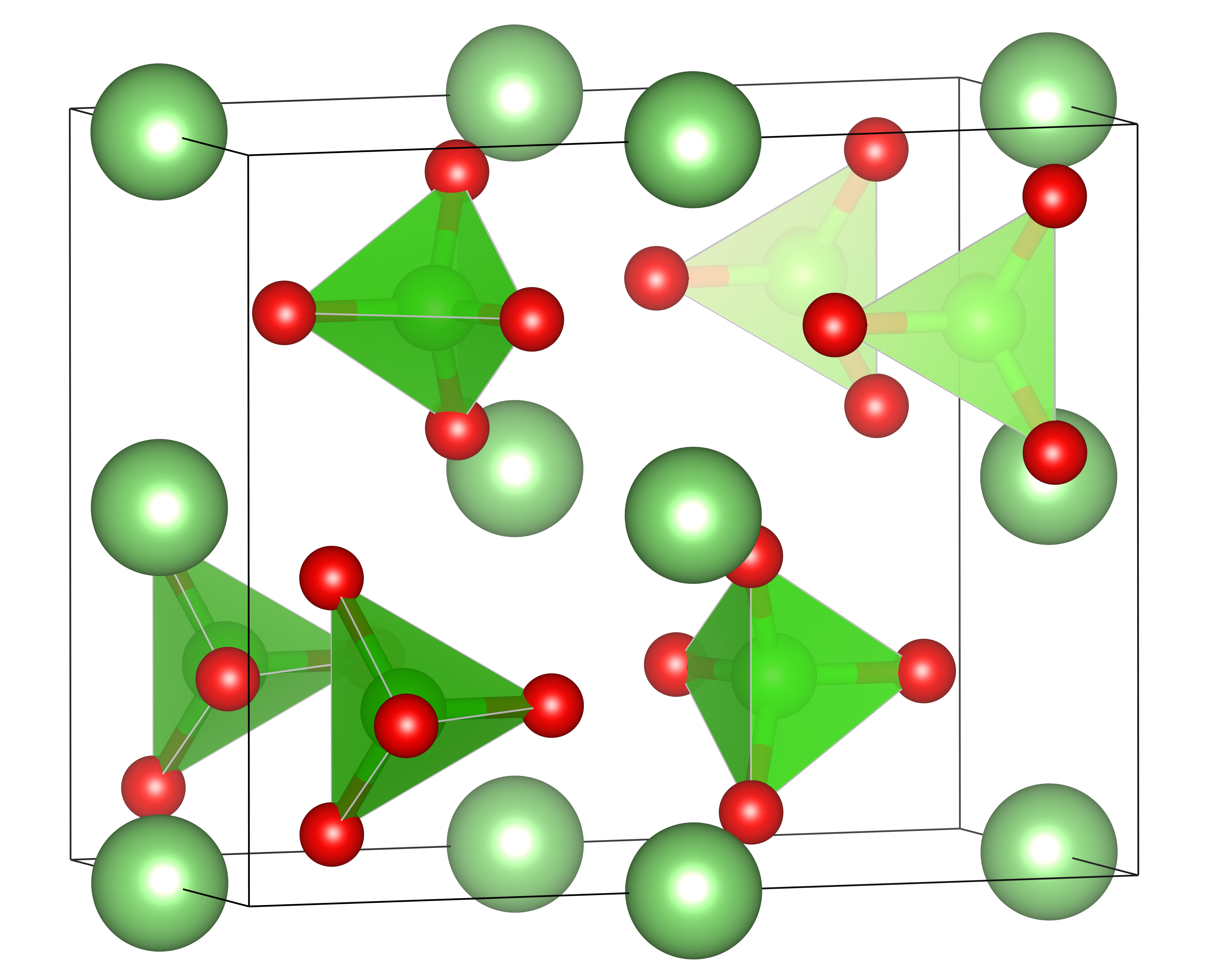

Names
- Other names: Cesium pertechnetate

Identifiers
CAS Number	13499-12-2
3D model (JSmol)	Interactive image
- InChI: InChI=1S/Cs.4O.Tc/q+1;;;;-1; Key: LJXGSBFUWIGJNN-UHFFFAOYSA-N
- SMILES: [Cs+].[O-] [Tc](=O)(=O)=O

Properties
Chemical formula	CsO_{4}Tc
Molar mass	295 g·mol^{−1}
Appearance	white solid
Melting point	590 °C

Structure
Crystal structure	orthorhombic
Space group	Pnma (No. 62)
Lattice constant	a = 572.6 pm, b = 592.2 pm, c = 1436 pm

Related compounds
Other anions	caesium perchlorate caesium permanganate caesium perrhenate
Other cations	pertechnetic acid lithium pertechnetate sodium pertechnetate potassium pertechnetate rubidium pertechnetate
- Except where otherwise noted, data are given for materials in their standard state (at 25 °C [77 °F], 100 kPa). Infobox references

Caesium pertechnetate is the pertechnetate salt of caesium, with the chemical formula of CsTcO_{4}.

== Preparation ==
Caesium pertechnetate can be prepared by reacting caesium carbonate and ammonium pertechnetate:

Cs_{2}CO_{3} + 2 NH_{4}TcO_{4} → 2 CsTcO_{4} + (NH_{4})_{2}CO_{3}

== Properties ==
Cesium pertechnetate is orthorhombic with space group Pnma (No. 62), and lattice parameters a = 572.6 pm, b = 592.2 pm and c = 1436 pm. The Tc–O-bond length in pertechnetate is 164.0 pm, and the O–Tc–O bond angle is 112.9°.
