= Rubidium pertechnetate =

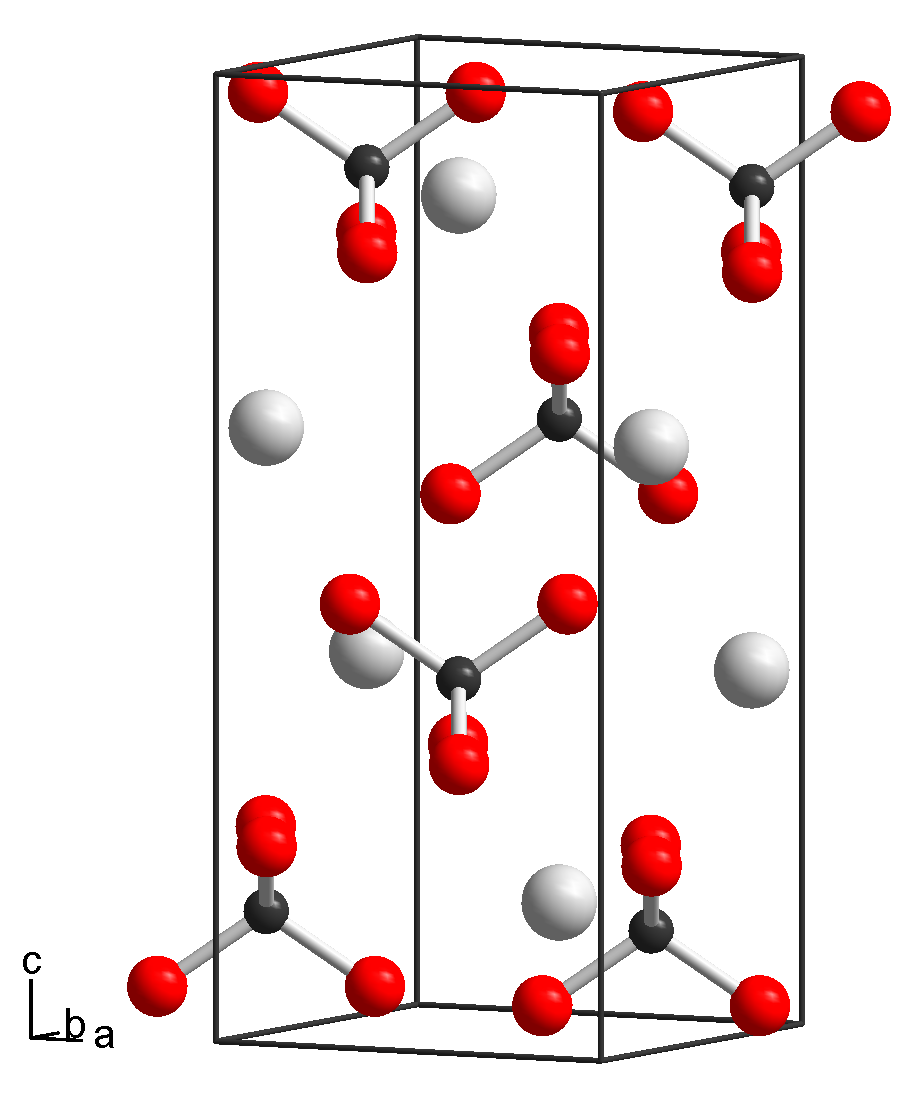

Identifiers
CAS Number	13597-49-4
3D model (JSmol)	Interactive image
PubChem CID	139036958
- InChI: InChI=1S/4O.Rb.Tc/q4*-2;+1;+7 Key: XBKKTBUGAOIDLF-UHFFFAOYSA-N
- SMILES: [Rb+].[O-][Tc](=O)(=O)=O

Properties
Chemical formula	O_{4}RbTc
Molar mass	247 g·mol^{−1}
Appearance	white solid
Solubility in water	1.167 g/100mL

Structure
Crystal structure	tetragonal
Space group	I41/a
Lattice constant	a = 576.2 pm, c = 1354.3 pm

Related compounds
Other anions	Rubidium perchlorate Rubidium permanganate
Other cations	Pertechnate; Lithium pertechnetate Sodium pertechnetate Potassium pertechnetate Caesium pertechnetate
- Except where otherwise noted, data are given for materials in their standard state (at 25 °C [77 °F], 100 kPa). Infobox references

Rubidium pertechnetate is a pertechnetate of rubidium, with the chemical formula RbTcO_{4}.

== Structure ==
Rubidium pertechnetate crystallizes in the tetragonal crystal system, with space group I41/a, and lattice parameters a = 576.2 pm and c = 1354.3 pm. In its structure, the Tc–O bond length is 172.3 pm, O–Tc–O bond angle is 108.34°.

== Preparation ==
Rubidium pertechnetate can be prepared by reacting rubidium carbonate with ammonium pertechnetate:

Rb_{2}CO_{3} + 2 NH_{4}TcO_{4} → 2 RbTcO_{4} + (NH_{4})_{2}CO_{3}
