= Technetium oxide =

Technetium oxide may refer to:

- Technetium(IV) oxide, TcO_{2}
- Technetium(VII) oxide, Tc_{2}O_{7}
