= Potassium pertechnetate =

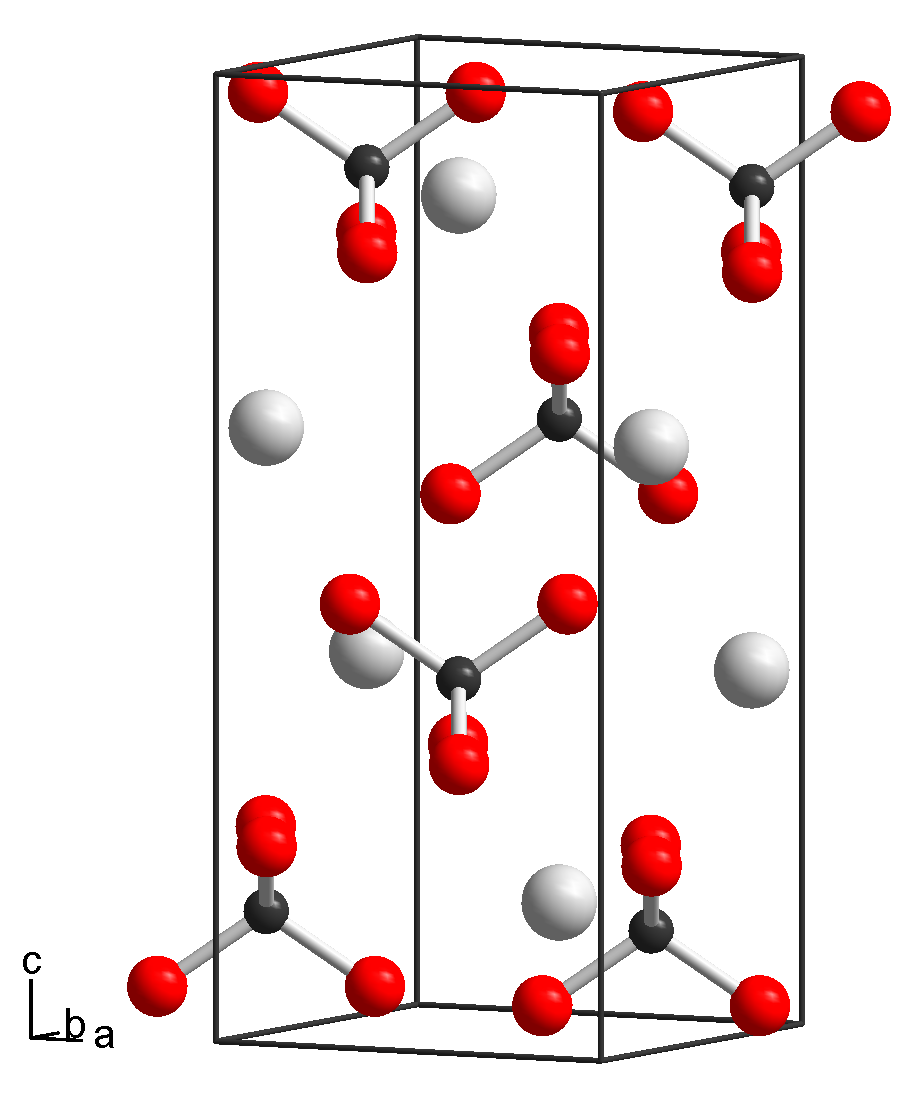

Identifiers
CAS Number	75492-44-3 ^{99}Tc
3D model (JSmol)	Interactive image
- InChI: InChI=1S/K.4O.Tc/q+1;;;;-1; Key: RXUFGZNRBITENT-UHFFFAOYSA-N
- SMILES: [K+].[O-][Tc](=O)(=O)=O

Properties
Chemical formula	KTcO_{4}
Molar mass	201.1
Appearance	colourless solid
Melting point	540 °C
Boiling point	around 1000 °C
Solubility in water	2.13g (20 °C)

Related compounds
Other anions	potassium permanganate potassium perrhenate
Other cations	sodium pertechnetate ammonium pertechnetate silver pertechnetate
Related compounds	technetium(VII) oxide pertechnetic acid
- Except where otherwise noted, data are given for materials in their standard state (at 25 °C [77 °F], 100 kPa). Infobox references

Potassium pertechnetate is a chemical compound of technetium and potassium, with the chemical formula of KTcO_{4}.

== Preparation ==
Potassium pertechnetate can be obtained by the neutralisation of potassium hydroxide and pertechnetic acid:

KOH + HTcO_{4} → KTcO_{4} + H_{2}O

== Properties ==
The distance of the Tc–O bond in potassium pertechnetate is 173.9 pm and the angle of the O–Tc–O bond is 108.05° and 110.19°. The distance between the potassium and the oxygen is 289.36 pm and 286 pm. Potassium pertechnetate crystallizes in the tetragonal crystal system with space group I4_{1}/a (space group no. 88). The lattice parameters are a = 563.0 pm and c = 1286.7 pm.

== Use ==
Potassium pertechnetate is used to prepare other radiopharmaceuticals.
