= Sodium technetate(V) =

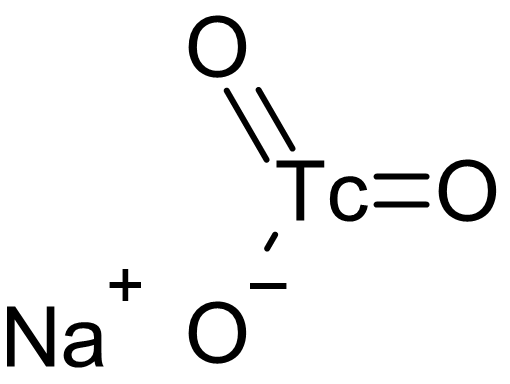
- Sodium metatechnetate

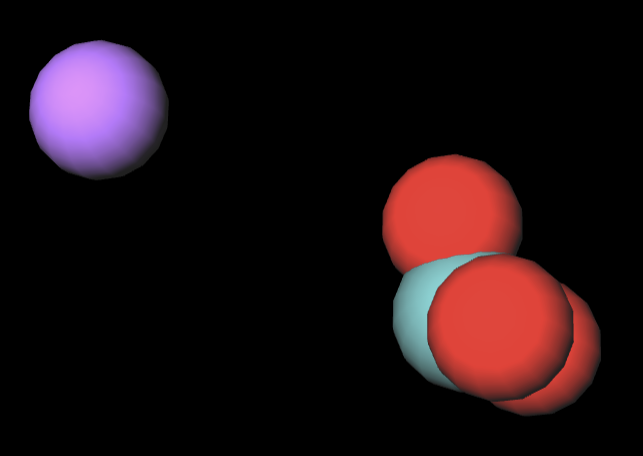

Names
- IUPAC name Sodium technetate(V)
- Other names Sodium metatechnetate

Identifiers
CAS Number	12034-16-1
3D model (JSmol)	Interactive image
- InChI: InChI=1S/Na.3O.Tc/q+1;;;-1; Key: XSYOGEJUTSVIIS-UHFFFAOYSA-N
- SMILES: [Na+].[O-][Tc](=O)=O

Properties
Chemical formula	NaTcO_{3}
Molar mass	168.8942 g/mol
Appearance	black solid
Melting point	800 °C (1,470 °F; 1,070 K) (decomposes)
Solubility in water	insoluble

Hazards
- Occupational safety and health (OHS/OSH)
Main hazards	toxic, radioactive

Related compounds
Other anions	Sodium pertechnetate
- Except where otherwise noted, data are given for materials in their standard state (at 25 °C [77 °F], 100 kPa). Infobox references

Sodium technetate(V) is an inorganic compound with the chemical formula NaTcO_{3}. It is a perovskite material and a rare example of an insoluble sodium salt.

== Preparation ==
Sodium technetate(V) can be prepared by co-heating technetium, sodium pertechnetate and sodium oxide, and decomposition occurs at high temperature. In addition, Na^{99}_{2}MoO_{4} decomposed in a NaOH solution will also produce NaTcO_{3}. The NaTcO_{3} puckering effect resembles NaMoO_{3} and the band between the e^{π}_{g} and a_{1g} state disappears.

== Properties ==
NaTcO_{3} is a black solid that is a member of the Na_{2}O–Tc_{2}O_{5} system. It is stable to 800 °C (1,470 °F; 1,070 K).

== External reading ==
- Keller, C.; Kanellakopulos, B. (April 1965). "Ternäre oxide des drei-bis siebenwertigen technetiums mit alkalien" [Ternary oxides of tri- to septivalent technetium and alkali metals]. Journal of Inorganic and Nuclear Chemistry. 27 (4): 787–795. doi:10.1016/0022-1902(65)80438-9.
- Kanellakopulos, Basil. The ternary oxide of 3-to 7-valent technetium with alkalis. (1964), (AEC Accession No. 31424, Rept. No. KFK-197), pg. 73.
