= Carlo Perrier =

Italian mineralogist and physicist (1886–1948)

- Born: 7 July 1886; Turin, Kingdom of Italy
- Died: 22 May 1948 (aged 61); Genoa, Italy
- Known for: Discovery of technetium

Carlo Perrier (born 7 July 1886 in Turin; died 22 May 1948 in Genoa ) was an Italian mineralogist and chemist who did extensive research on the element technetium. With the discovery of technetium in 1937, he and Emilio Segrè accounted for the last gap in the periodic table. Technetium was the first element produced artificially (hence the name that Segrè and Perrier gave it).

His parents were named Bertolini. Perrier studied chemistry at the Polytechnic in Turin with a Laureate degree in 1908. From 1911 to 1912 he worked at the Laboratory for Physical Chemistry and Electrochemistry at ETH Zurich with Baur and Treadwell. He then worked as an assistant of Arnaldo Piutti at the University of Naples. There he made friends with Ferruccio Zambonini and involved with mineralogy and the study of radioactivity. He was Zambonini's assistant in Turin and, after a competition, became director of the State Geochemical Laboratory in Rome in 1921. In 1927 he completed his habilitation and after another competition became an associate professor in Messina. In 1929 he relocated to Palermo and in 1939 to the University of Genoa.

Segrè and Perrier found technetium in a sample of molybdenum that had been bombarded with deuterons in the Berkeley cyclotron. The element occurs naturally, but all its isotopes have a relatively brief half-life in geological terms. He also dealt with crystal chemistry and petrography.

He was a member of the Academies of Messina, Palermo and Catania and the Accademia dei Lincei (corresponding member 1947). He was also on the Italian National Scientific Council for Geology and Mineralogy.

The mineral perrierite ( perrierite (Ce) ) is named in his honor, a black to dark brown monoclinic group silicate with cerium, iron and titanium, which is a rare component of the Neptune sand in Rome.
