= Technetium(IV) chloride =

Names
- IUPAC name Technetium(IV) chloride
- Other names Technetium tetrachloride, Technetium chloride

Identifiers
CAS Number	14215-13-5
3D model (JSmol)	Interactive image
ChemSpider	73944719
PubChem CID	23047010
CompTox Dashboard (EPA)	DTXSID801045198
- InChI: InChI=1S/4ClH.Tc/h4*1H;/q;;;;+4/p-4 Key: DCEWLADEQKZQQZ-UHFFFAOYSA-J
- SMILES: [Cl-].[Cl-].[Cl-].[Cl-].[Tc+4]

Properties
Chemical formula	TcCl_{4}
Molar mass	239.718 g/mol
Appearance	Red solid
Boiling point	300 °C (572 °F; 573 K)

Structure
Crystal structure	Orthorhombic, oP40
Space group	Pbca, No. 61
Lattice constant	a = 0.603 nm, b = 1.165 nm, c = 1.406 nm α = 90°, β = 90°, γ = 90°

Related compounds
Other anions	Technetium(VI) fluoride
Other cations	Manganese(II) chloride Rhenium(V) chloride Ruthenium(III) chloride
- Except where otherwise noted, data are given for materials in their standard state (at 25 °C [77 °F], 100 kPa). verify (what is ?) Infobox references

Technetium(IV) chloride is the inorganic compound with the formula TcCl_{4}. It was discovered in 1957 as the first binary halide of technetium. It is the highest oxidation binary chloride of technetium that has been isolated as a solid. It is volatile at elevated temperatures and its volatility has been used for separating technetium from other metal chlorides. Colloidal solutions of technetium(IV) chloride are oxidized to form Tc(VII) ions when exposed to gamma rays.

Technetium tetrachloride can be synthesized from the reaction of Cl_{2} with technetium metal at elevated temperatures between 300 and 500 °C:

Tc + 2 Cl_{2} → TcCl_{4}

Technetium tetrachloride has also been prepared from the reaction of technetium(VII) oxide with carbon tetrachloride in a sealed vessel at elevated temperature:

Tc_{2}O_{7} + 7 CCl_{4} → 2 TcCl_{4} + 7 COCl_{2} + 3 Cl_{2}

At 450 °C under vacuum, TcCl_{4} decomposes to TcCl_{3} and TcCl_{2}.

As verified by X-ray crystallography, the compound is an inorganic polymer consisting of interconnected TcCl_{6} octahedra.
