= Technetium(VII) sulfide =

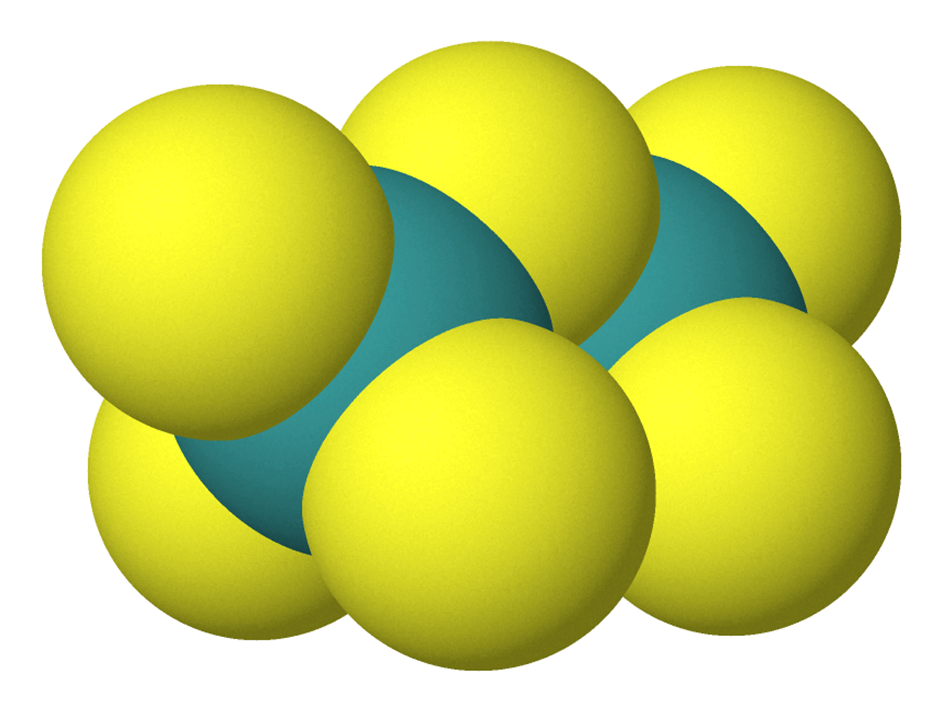

Names
- Other names Technetium heptasulphide, ditechnetium heptasulphide

Identifiers
3D model (JSmol)	Interactive image
PubChem CID	22262427
- InChI: InChI=1S/7S.2Tc/q7*-2;2*+7 Key: AFSSMICCRUWSKE-UHFFFAOYSA-N
- SMILES: [S-2].[S-2].[S-2].[S-2].[S-2].[S-2].[S-2].[Tc+7].[Tc+7]

Properties
Chemical formula	S_{7}Tc_{2}
Molar mass	420 g·mol^{−1}
Appearance	dark brown crystals
Solubility in water	insoluble

Related compounds
Related compounds	Rhenium(VII) sulfide
- Except where otherwise noted, data are given for materials in their standard state (at 25 °C [77 °F], 100 kPa). Infobox references

Technetium(VII) sulfide is a binary inorganic chemical compound of technetium metal and sulfur with the chemical formula Tc_{2}S_{7}.

== Synthesis ==
Passing hydrogen sulfide through acidic solutions of pertechnetates:

2KTcO_{4} + 7H_{2}S + 2HCl → Tc_{2}S_{7}↓ + 2KCl + 8H_{2}O

2NH_{4}TcO_{4} + 7H_{2}S + 2HCl → Tc_{2}S_{7}↓ + 2NH_{4}Cl + 8H_{2}O

== Chemical properties ==
It is restored by hydrogen at 1000 °C:

Tc_{2}S_{7} + 7H_{2} → 2Tc + 7H_{2}S
