= Technetium(IV) oxide =

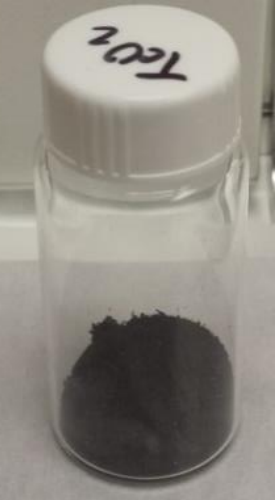

Names
- Other names: Technetium dioxide

Identifiers
CAS Number	12036-16-7
3D model (JSmol)	Interactive image
ChEBI	CHEBI:26864
ChemSpider	5256775
Gmelin Reference	873611
PubChem CID	6857437
CompTox Dashboard (EPA)	DTXSID601316101
- InChI: InChI=1S/2O.Tc
- SMILES: O=[Tc]=O

Properties
Chemical formula	TcO_{2}
Molar mass	130.00 g/mol
Appearance	Black solid
Density	6.9 g/cm^{3}
Melting point	1,100 °C (2,010 °F; 1,370 K) (sublimes)
Solubility in water	Insoluble
Solubility	Slightly soluble in acid (dihydrate)

Structure
Crystal structure	Isostructural to MoO_{2}

Thermochemistry
Gibbs free energy (Δ_{f}G^{⦵})	−305.974±3.377 (dihydrate)

Related compounds
Other anions	Technetium(IV) chloride
Related compounds	Technetium(VII) oxide
- Except where otherwise noted, data are given for materials in their standard state (at 25 °C [77 °F], 100 kPa). Infobox references

Technetium(IV) oxide, also known as technetium dioxide, is a chemical compound with the formula TcO_{2} which forms the dihydrate, TcO_{2}·2H_{2}O, which is also known as technetium(IV) hydroxide. It is a radioactive black solid which slowly oxidizes in air.

== Preparation ==
Technetium dioxide was first produced in 1949 by electrolyzing a solution of ammonium pertechnetate under ammonium hydroxide and this method is used for separating technetium from molybdenum and rhenium. There are now more efficient ways of producing the compound, such as the reduction of ammonium pertechnetate by zinc metal and hydrochloric acid, stannous chloride, hydrazine, hydroxylamine, ascorbic acid, by the hydrolysis of potassium hexachlorotechnate or by the decomposition of ammonium pertechnetate at 700 °C under an inert atmosphere:

2 NH_{4}TcO_{4} → 2 TcO_{2} + 4 H_{2}O + N_{2}

All of these methods except the last lead to the formation of the dihydrate. The most modern method of producing this compound is by the reaction of ammonium pertechnetate with sodium dithionite.

== Properties ==
The dihydrate dehydrates to anhydrous technetium dioxide at 300 °C, and if further heated sublime at 1,100 °C under an inert atmosphere, however, if oxygen is present, it will react with the oxygen to produce technetium(VII) oxide at 450 °C. If water is present, pertechnetic acid is produced by the reaction of technetium(VII) oxide with water.

If technetium dioxide is treated with a base, such as sodium hydroxide, it forms the hydroxotechnetate(IV) ion, which is easily oxidized to pertechnetic acid in numerous ways, such as the reaction with alkaline hydrogen peroxide, concentrated nitric acid, bromine, or tetravalent cerium.

The solubility of technetium(IV) oxide is very low and is reported to be 3.9 μg/L. The main species when technetium dioxide is dissolved in water is TcO^{2+} at pH below 1.5, TcO(OH)^{+} pH between 1.5 and 2.5, TcO(OH)_{2} pH between 2.5 and 10.9, and TcO(OH)^{–}_{3} above pH 10.9. The solubility can be affected by adding various organic ligands such as humic acid and EDTA, or by the addition of hydrochloric acid. This can be a problem if technetium(IV) oxide is released into the soil, as it will increase the solubility.

If technetium dioxide is electrolyzed in acidic conditions, the following reaction occurs:

TcO_{2}·2H_{2}O → TcO^{–}_{4} + 4 H^{+} + 3 e^{–}

The electrode potential measured for this reaction is −837.2±10.0 kJ/mol.

The molar magnetic susceptibility of TcO_{2}·2H_{2}O was found to be χ_{m} = 244×10^{6}.
