= Ammonium pertechnetate =

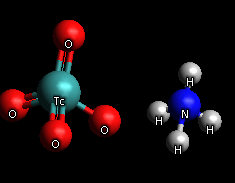

- Ammonium pertechnetate

Names
- IUPAC name Ammonium pertechnetate

Identifiers
CAS Number	34035-97-7
3D model (JSmol)	Interactive image
ChemSpider	7851725
PubChem CID	9577286
- InChI: InChI=1S/H2O.3O.Tc/h1H2;;;;/q;;;;+1/p-1 Key: WJULHBIORCQBSY-PUQAOBSFSA-O
- SMILES: [O-][Tc](=O)(=O)=O.[NH4+]

Properties
Chemical formula	H_{4}NO_{4}Tc
Molar mass	180 g·mol^{−1}

Related compounds
Other anions	Ammonium nitrate
Other cations	Sodium pertechnetate Potassium pertechnetate Calcium pertechnetate
Related compounds	Perchloric acid
- Except where otherwise noted, data are given for materials in their standard state (at 25 °C [77 °F], 100 kPa). Infobox references

Ammonium pertechnetate is a chemical compound with the formula NH_{4}TcO_{4}. It is the ammonium salt of pertechnetic acid. The most common form uses ^{99}Tc. The compound is readily soluble in aqueous solutions forming ammonium and pertechnetate ions.

== Synthesis ==
It can be synthesized by the reaction of pertechnetic acid and ammonium nitrate:

HTcO_{4} + NH_{4}NO_{3} → NH_{4}TcO_{4} + HNO_{3}

It thermally decomposes under inert atmosphere at 700 °C to technetium dioxide:

NH_{4}TcO_{4} → TcO_{2} + 2 H_{2}O + 1/2 N_{2}

== Chemical properties ==
Passing hydrogen sulfide through acidic solutions of ammonium pertechnetate produces Technetium(VII) sulfide:

2NH_{4}TcO_{4} + 7H_{2}S + 2HCl → Tc_{2}S_{7}↓ + 2NH_{4}Cl + 8H_{2}O
