= Technetium hexafluoride =

Technetium(VI) fluoride
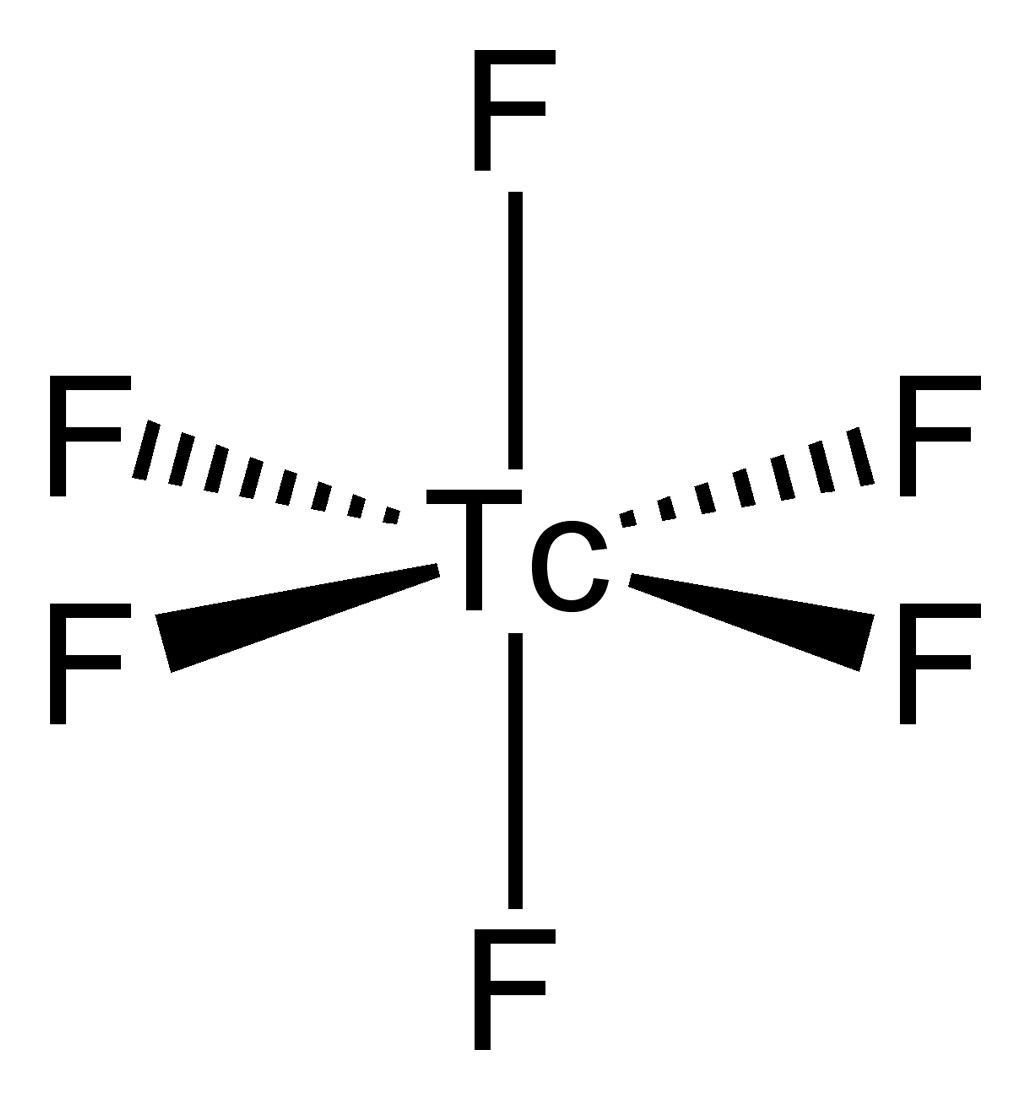

Identifiers
CAS Number	13842-93-8
3D model (JSmol)	Interactive image
ChemSpider	57450770
PubChem CID	57470148
- InChI: InChI=1S/6FH.Tc/h6*1H;/q;;;;;;+6/p-6 Key: PRVOBRCYHYXCMU-UHFFFAOYSA-H
- SMILES: F[Tc](F)(F)(F)(F)F

Properties
Chemical formula	TcF_{6}
Molar mass	212 g/mol (^{98}Tc)
Appearance	golden-yellow crystals
Density	3,58 g/cm^{3} (−140 °C), solid
Melting point	37.4 °C (99.3 °F; 310.5 K)
Boiling point	55.3 °C (131.5 °F; 328.4 K)

Structure
Crystal structure	cubic
- Except where otherwise noted, data are given for materials in their standard state (at 25 °C [77 °F], 100 kPa). verify (what is ?) Infobox references

Technetium hexafluoride or technetium(VI) fluoride (TcF_{6}) is a yellow inorganic compound with a low melting point. It was first identified in 1961. In this compound, technetium has an oxidation state of +6, the highest oxidation state found in the technetium halides. In this respect, technetium differs from rhenium, which forms a heptafluoride, ReF_{7}. Technetium hexafluoride occurs as an impurity in uranium hexafluoride, as technetium is a fission product of uranium (spontaneous fission in natural uranium, possible contamination from induced fission inside the reactor in reprocessed uranium). The fact that the boiling point of the hexafluorides of uranium and technetium are very close to each other presents a problem in using fluoride volatility in nuclear reprocessing.

== Preparation ==
Technetium hexafluoride is prepared by heating technetium metal with an excess of F_{2} at 400 °C.

Tc + 3 F_{2} → TcF_{6}

== Description ==
Technetium hexafluoride is a golden-yellow solid at room temperature. Its melting point is 37.4 °C and its boiling point is 55.3 °C.

Technetium hexafluoride undergoes a solid phase transition at −4.54 °C. Above this temperature (measured at 10 °C), the solid structure is cubic. Lattice parameters are a = 6.16 Å. There are two formula units (in this case, discrete molecules) per unit cell, giving a density of 3.02 g·cm^{−3}. Below this temperature (measured at −19 °C), the solid structure is orthorhombic space group Pnma. Lattice parameters are a = 9.55 Å, b = 8.74 Å, and c = 5.02 Å. There are four formula units (in this case, discrete molecules) per unit cell, giving a density of 3.38 g·cm^{−3}. At −140 °C, the solid structure is still orthothombic, but the lattice parameters are now a = 9.360 Å, b = 8.517 Å, and c = 4.934 Å, giving a density of 3.58 g·cm^{−3}.

The TcF_{6} molecule itself (the form important for the liquid or gas phase) has octahedral molecular geometry, which has point group (O_{h}). The Tc–F bond length is 1.812 Å. Its magnetic moment has been measured to be 0.45 μ_{B}.

== Properties ==
=== Physical ===
TcF_{6} is octahedral, as shown by infrared and Raman spectra. Its low-temperature orthorhombic form converts to the higher symmetry body-centred cubic form at room temperature, like other metal hexafluorides such as RhF_{6} and OsF_{6}. Preliminary measurements of magnetic moment yield a value of 0.45 μB, which is lower than expected for a d^{1} octahedral compound.

=== Chemical ===
TcF_{6} reacts with alkaline chlorides in iodine pentafluoride (IF_{5}) solution to form hexafluorotechnetates. TcF_{6} disproportionates on hydrolysis with aqueous NaOH to form a black precipitate of TcO_{2}. In hydrogen fluoride solution, TcF_{6} reacts with hydrazinium fluoride to yield N_{2}H_{6}TcF_{6} or N_{2}H_{6}(TcF_{6})_{2}.
