= Pertechnetate =

Chemical compound or ion

The structure of the technetate(VII) ion

The pertechnetate ion (/pərˈtɛknəteɪt/) is an oxyanion with the chemical formula TcO^{−}_{4}. It is often used as a convenient water-soluble source of isotopes of the radioactive element technetium (Tc). In particular it is used to carry the ^{99m}Tc isotope (half-life 6 hours) which is commonly used in nuclear medicine in several nuclear scanning procedures.

Pertechnetate is poorly hydrated as [TcO_{4}(H_{2}O)_{n}]^{−} and [TcO_{4}(H_{2}O)_{n-m}]^{−}[H_{3}O]^{+}_{m} (n = 1–50, m = 1–4) clusters that have been demonstrated by simulation with DFT. First hydration shell of TcO_{4}^{−} is asymmetric and contains no more than 7 water molecules. Only three of the four oxygen atoms of TcO_{4}^{−} form hydrogen bonds with water molecules.

A technetate(VII) salt is a compound containing this ion. Pertechnetate compounds are salts of technetic(VII) acid. Pertechnetate is analogous to permanganate but it has little oxidizing power. Pertechnetate has higher oxidation power than perrhenate.

Understanding pertechnetate is important in understanding technetium contamination in the environment and in nuclear waste management.

== Chemistry ==
TcO^{−}_{4} is the starting material for most of the chemistry of technetium. Pertechnetate salts are usually colorless. TcO^{−}_{4} is produced by oxidizing technetium with nitric acid or with hydrogen peroxide. The pertechnetate anion is similar to the permanganate anion but is a weaker oxidizing agent. It is tetrahedral and diamagnetic. The standard electrode potential for TcO^{−}_{4}/TcO_{2} is only +0.738 V in acidic solution, as compared to +1.695 V for MnO^{−}_{4}/MnO_{2}. Because of its diminished oxidizing power, TcO^{−}_{4} is stable in alkaline solution. TcO^{−}_{4} is more similar to ReO^{−}_{4}. Depending on the reducing agent, TcO^{−}_{4} can be converted to derivatives containing Tc(VI), Tc(V), and Tc(IV). In the absence of strong complexing ligands, TcO^{−}_{4} is reduced to a +4 oxidation state via the formation of TcO_{2} hydrate.

Some metals like actinides, barium, scandium, yttrium or zirconium may form complex salts with pertechnetate thus strongly effecting its liquid-liquid extraction behavior.

== Preparation of ^{99m}TcO_{4}− ==
^{99m}Tc is conveniently available in high radionuclidic purity from molybdenum-99, which decays with 87% probability to ^{99m}Tc. The subsequent decay of ^{99m}Tc leads to either ^{99}Tc or ^{99}Ru. ^{99}Mo can be produced in a nuclear reactor via irradiation of either molybdenum-98 or naturally occurring molybdenum with thermal neutrons, but this is not the method currently in use today. Currently, ^{99}Mo is recovered as a product of the nuclear fission reaction of ^{235}U, separated from other fission products via a multistep process and loaded onto a column of alumina that forms the core of a ^{99}Mo/^{99m}Tc radioisotope generator.

As the ^{99}Mo continuously decays to ^{99m}Tc, the ^{99m}Tc can be removed periodically (usually daily) by flushing a saline solution (0.15 M NaCl in water) through the alumina column: the more highly charged ^{99}MoO^{2−}_{4} is retained on the column, where it continues to undergo radioactive decay, while the medically useful radioisotope ^{99m}TcO^{−}_{4} is eluted in the saline. The eluate from the column must be sterile and pyrogen free, so that the Tc drug can be used directly, usually within 12 hours of elution. In a few cases, sublimation or solvent extraction may be used.

=== Examples ===
- A complex that can penetrate the blood–brain barrier is generated by reduction of ^{99m}TcO^{−}_{4} with tin(II) in the presence of the ligand hexamethylpropylene amine oxime (HMPAO) to form TcO-D,L-HMPAO.
- A complex that for imaging the lungs, Tc-MAA, is generated by reduction of ^{99m}TcO^{−}_{4} with SnCl_{2} in the presence of human serum albumin.
- [^{99m}Tc(OH2)3(CO)3]+, which is both water and air stable, is generated by reduction of ^{99m}TcO^{−}_{4} with carbon monoxide. This compound is a precursor to complexes that can be used in cancer diagnosis and therapy involving DNA-DNA pretargeting.

== Compounds ==
Formula	name	crystal structure	cell dimensions (Å)	unit cell volume (Å^{3})	remarks	references
LiTcO_{4}	lithium pertechnetate					
LiTcO_{4}·2H_{2}O	lithium pertechnetate dihydrate					
LiTcO_{4}·3H_{2}O	lithium pertechnetate trihydrate			Pt_{3}/mc		
NaTcO_{4}	sodium pertechnetate	tetragonal	a = 5.342, c = 1.874	338.91	absorbs water from atmosphere	
NaTcO_{4}·H_{2}O	sodium pertechnetate monohydrate					
NaTcO_{4}·2H_{2}O	sodium pertechnetate dihydrate					
NaTcO_{4}·4H_{2}O	sodium pertechnetate tetrahydrate					
KTcO_{4}	potassium pertechnetate	tetragonal	a = 5.647, c = 12.91	411.73	used to prepare radiopharmaceuticals	
RbTcO_{4}	rubidium pertechnetate	tetragonal	a = 5.762, c =13.543	449.65		
α-CsTcO_{4}	α-caesium pertechnetate	tetragonal	a = 5.898, c = 14.38		volatile at temperatures >470K	
β-CsTcO_{4}	β-caesium pertechnetate	orthorhombic	a = 5.737, b = 5.92, c = 14.341	486.38		
TlTcO_{4}	thallium pertechnetate	orthorhombic				
TlTcO_{4}	thallium pertechnetate	tetragonal				
NH_{4}TcO_{4}	ammonium pertechnetate	tetragonal			technetium may be supplied in this form	
AgTcO_{4}	silver pertechnetate	tetragonal				

== Reactions ==
- Radiolysis of TcO^{−}_{4} in nitrate solutions proceeds through the reduction to TcO^{2−}_{4} which induces complex disproportionation processes:

TcO_{4}^{−} + e^{−} → TcO_{4}^{2−}
2TcO_{4}^{2−} → TcO_{4}^{−} + Tc^{V}
2Tc^{V} → TcO_{4}^{2−} + Tc^{IV}
Tc^{V} + TcO_{4}^{2−} → Tc^{IV} + TcO^{−}_{4}

- Pertechnetate can react with H_{2}S to give Tc_{2}S_{7}.
- Pertechnetate is also reduced to Tc(IV/V) compounds in alkaline solutions in nuclear waste tanks without adding catalytic metals, reducing agents, or external radiation. Reactions of mono- and disaccharides with ^{99m}TcO^{−}_{4} yield Tc(IV) compounds that are water-soluble.

== Uses ==
=== Pharmaceutical use ===
The half-life of ^{99m}Tc is long enough that labelling synthesis of the radiopharmaceutical and scintigraphic measurements can be performed without significant loss of radioactivity. The energy emitted from ^{99m}Tc is 140 keV, which allows for the study of deep body organs. Radiopharmaceuticals have no intended pharmacologic effect and are used in very low concentrations. Radiopharmaceuticals containing ^{99m}Tc are currently being applied in the determining morphology of organs, testing of organ function, and scintigraphic and emission tomographic imaging. The gamma radiation emitted by the radionuclide allows organs to be imaged in vivo tomographically. Currently, over 80% of radiopharmaceuticals used clinically are labelled with ^{99m}Tc. A majority of radiopharmaceuticals labelled with ^{99m}Tc are synthesized by the reduction of the pertechnetate ion in the presence of ligands chosen to confer organ specificity of the drug. The resulting ^{99m}Tc compound is then injected into the body and a "gamma camera" is focused on sections or planes in order to image the spatial distribution of the ^{99m}Tc.

==== Specific imaging applications ====
^{99m}Tc is used primarily in the study of the thyroid gland - its morphology, vascularity, and function. TcO^{−}_{4} and iodide, due to their comparable charge/radius ratio, are similarly incorporated into the thyroid gland. The pertechnetate ion is not incorporated into the thyroglobulin. It is also used in the study of blood perfusion, regional accumulation, and cerebral lesions in the brain, as it accumulates primarily in the choroid plexus.

Pertechnetate salts, such as sodium pertechnetate, cannot pass through the blood–brain barrier. In addition to the salivary and thyroid glands, ^{99m}TcO^{−}_{4} localizes in the stomach. ^{99m}TcO^{−}_{4} is renally eliminated for the first three days after being injected. After a scanning is performed, it is recommended that a patient drink large amounts of water in order to expedite elimination of the radionuclide. Other methods of ^{99m}TcO^{−}_{4} administration include intraperitoneal, intramuscular, subcutaneous, as well as orally. The behavior of the ^{99m}TcO^{−}_{4} ion is essentially the same, with small differences due to the difference in rate of absorption, regardless of the method of administration.

=== Synthesis of ^{99m}TcO_{4}^{−} radiopharmaceuticals ===
^{99m}TcO^{−}_{4} is advantageous for the synthesis of a variety of radiopharmaceuticals because Tc can adopt a number of oxidation states. The oxidation state and coligands dictate the specificity of the radiopharmaceutical. The starting material Na[^{99m}TcO_{4}], made available after elution from the generator column, as mentioned above, can be reduced in the presence of complexing ligands. Many different reducing agents can be used, but transition metal reductants are avoided because they compete with ^{99m}Tc for ligands. Oxalates, formates, hydroxylamine, and hydrazine are also avoided because they form complexes with the technetium. Electrochemical reduction is impractical.

Ideally, the synthesis of the desired radiopharmaceutical from ^{99m}TcO^{−}_{4}, a reducing agent, and desired ligands should occur in one container after elution, and the reaction must be performed in a solvent that can be injected intravenously, such as a saline solution. Kits are available that contain the reducing agent, usually tin(II) and ligands. These kits are sterile, pyrogen-free, easily purchased, and can be stored for long periods of time. The reaction with ^{99m}TcO^{−}_{4} takes place directly after elution from the generator column and shortly before its intended use. A high organ specificity is important because the injected activity should accumulate in the organ under investigation, as there should be a high activity ratio of the target organ to nontarget organs. If there is a high activity in organs adjacent to the one under investigation, the image of the target organ can be obscured. Also, high organ specificity allows for the reduction of the injected activity, and thus the exposure to radiation, in the patient. The radiopharmaceutical must be kinetically inert, in that it must not change chemically in vivo en route to the target organ.

=== As a ^{99m}Tc carrier ===
A technetium-99m generator provides the pertechnetate containing the short-lived isotope ^{99m}Tc for medical uses. This compound is generated directly from molybdate held on alumina within the generator (see this topic for detail).

==== In nuclear medicine ====
Pertechnetate has a wide variety of uses in diagnostic nuclear medicine. Since technetate(VII) can substitute for iodine in the Na/I symporter (NIS) channel in follicular cells of the thyroid gland, inhibiting uptake of iodine into the follicular cells, ^{99m}Tc-pertechnetate can be used as an alternative to ^{123}I in imaging of the thyroid, although it specifically measures uptake and not organification. It has also been used historically to evaluate for testicular torsion, although ultrasound is more commonly used in current practice, as it does not deliver a radiation dose to the testes. It is also used in labeling of autologous red blood cells for MUGA scans to evaluate left ventricular cardiac function, localization of gastrointestinal bleeding prior to embolization or surgical management, and in damaged red blood cells to detect ectopic splenic tissue.

It is actively accumulated and secreted by the mucoid cells of the gastric mucosa, and therefore, technetate(VII) radiolabeled with technetium-99m is injected into the body when looking for ectopic gastric tissue as is found in a Meckel's diverticulum with Meckel's scans.

=== Non-radioactive uses ===
All technetium salts are mildly radioactive, but some of them have explored use of the element for its chemical properties. In these uses, its radioactivity is incidental, and generally the least radioactive (longest-lived) isotopes of Tc are used. In particular, ^{99}Tc (half-life 211,000 years) is used in corrosion research, because it is the decay product of the easily obtained commercial ^{99m}Tc isotope. Solutions of technetate(VII) react with the surface of iron to form technetium dioxide, in this way it is able to act as an anodic corrosion inhibitor.

== See also ==
- Permanganate
- Perrhenate
- Sodium pertechnetate
