= Pertechnetic acid =

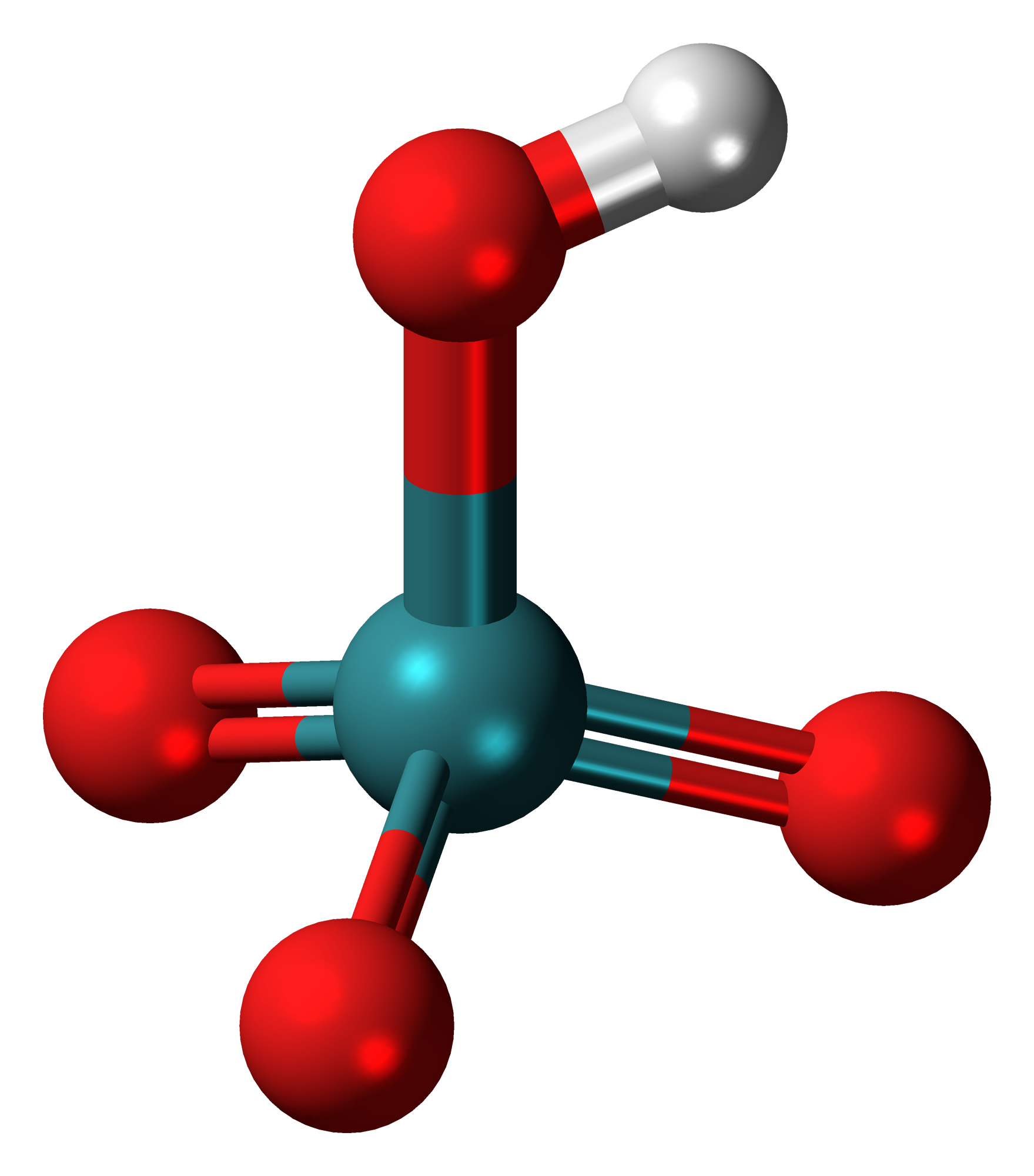

Names
- IUPAC name Pertechnetic acid

Identifiers
CAS Number	14332-45-7
3D model (JSmol)	Interactive image
ChemSpider	9979749
PubChem CID	11805084
- InChI: InChI=1S/H2O.3O.Tc/h1H2;;;;/q;;;;+1/p-1 Key: UTQISYNNAQMRBN-UHFFFAOYSA-M
- SMILES: O[Tc](=O)(=O)=O

Properties
Chemical formula	HO_{4}Tc
Molar mass	163 g·mol^{−1}
Conjugate base	Pertechnetate

Related compounds
Other anions	Permanganic acid Perrhenic acid
Other cations	Sodium pertechnetate
Related compounds	Perchloric acid
- Except where otherwise noted, data are given for materials in their standard state (at 25 °C [77 °F], 100 kPa). Infobox references

Pertechnetic acid (HTcO_{4}) is a compound of technetium that is produced by reacting technetium(VII) oxide (Tc_{2}O_{7}) with water or reacting Tc metal or TcO2 with strong oxidizing acids, such as nitric acid, piranha solution or aqua regia. The dark red hygroscopic substance is a strong acid, with a pK_{a} of 0.32, as such it exists almost entirely as the pertechnetate ion in aqueous solution. The red color in solution is thought to be due to the formation of the polyoxometallate Tc_{20}O^{4−}_{68}, while fresh HTcO_{4} is white.

Use of strong enough acid solution, for example, concentrated sulfuric acid, can generate the protonated form, which then exists as the octahedral TcO_{3}(OH)(H_{2}O)_{2} dihydrate complex.

In aqueous solutions the pertechnic acid is complitely dissociated and therefore it is considered as very strong acid its deviation from ideal activity being due to ion pair and triple ion formation with counter-cation of hydronium.

Density and activity values of pertechnetic acid aqueous solutions at T = 298.15 K are tabulated in.

== See also ==
- Sodium pertechnetate
