= Technetium(VII) oxide =

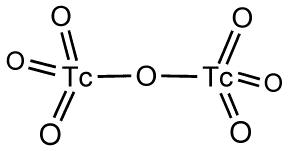
- Structural formula of technetium(VII) oxide.

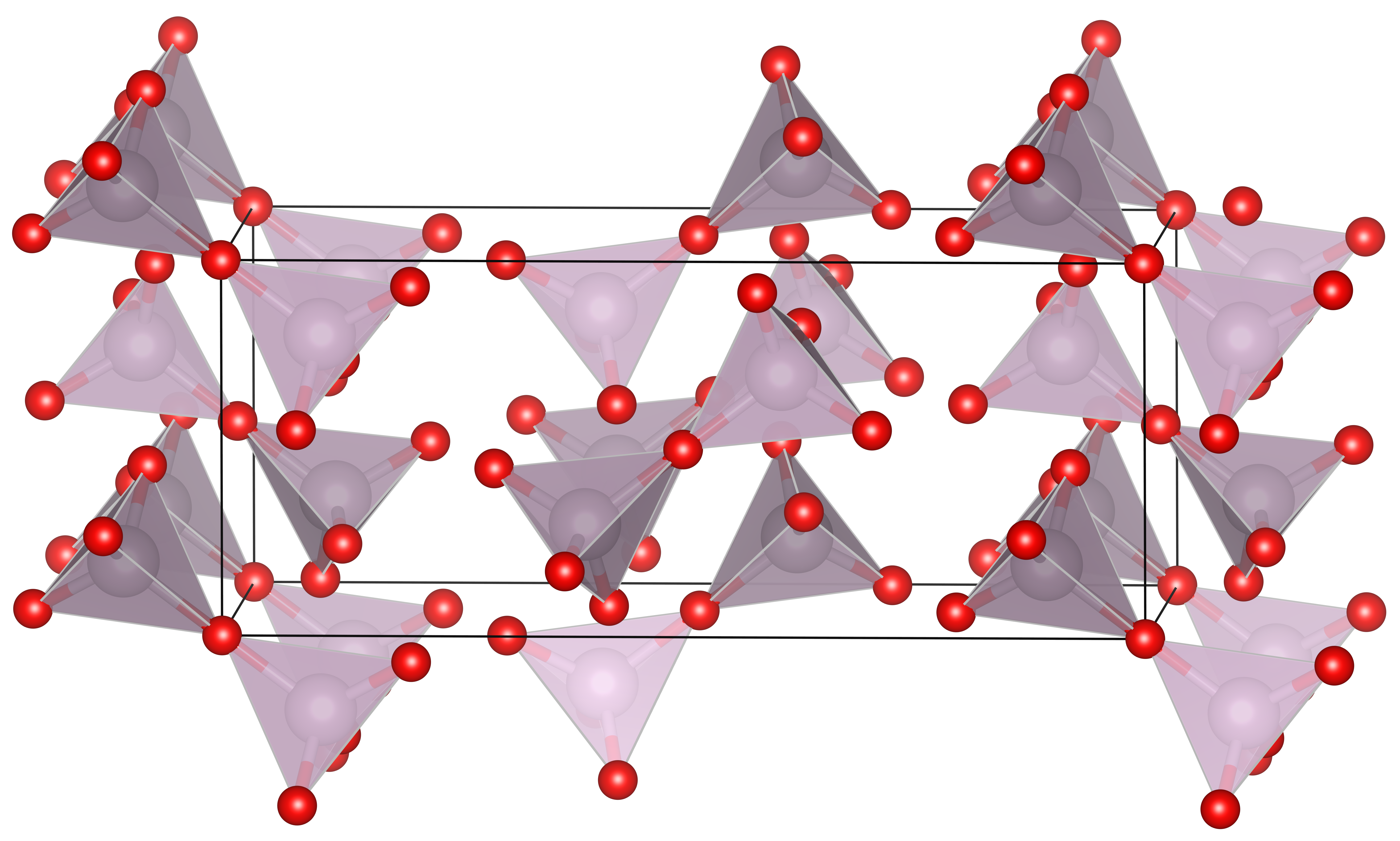
- Unit cell of technetium(VII) oxide.

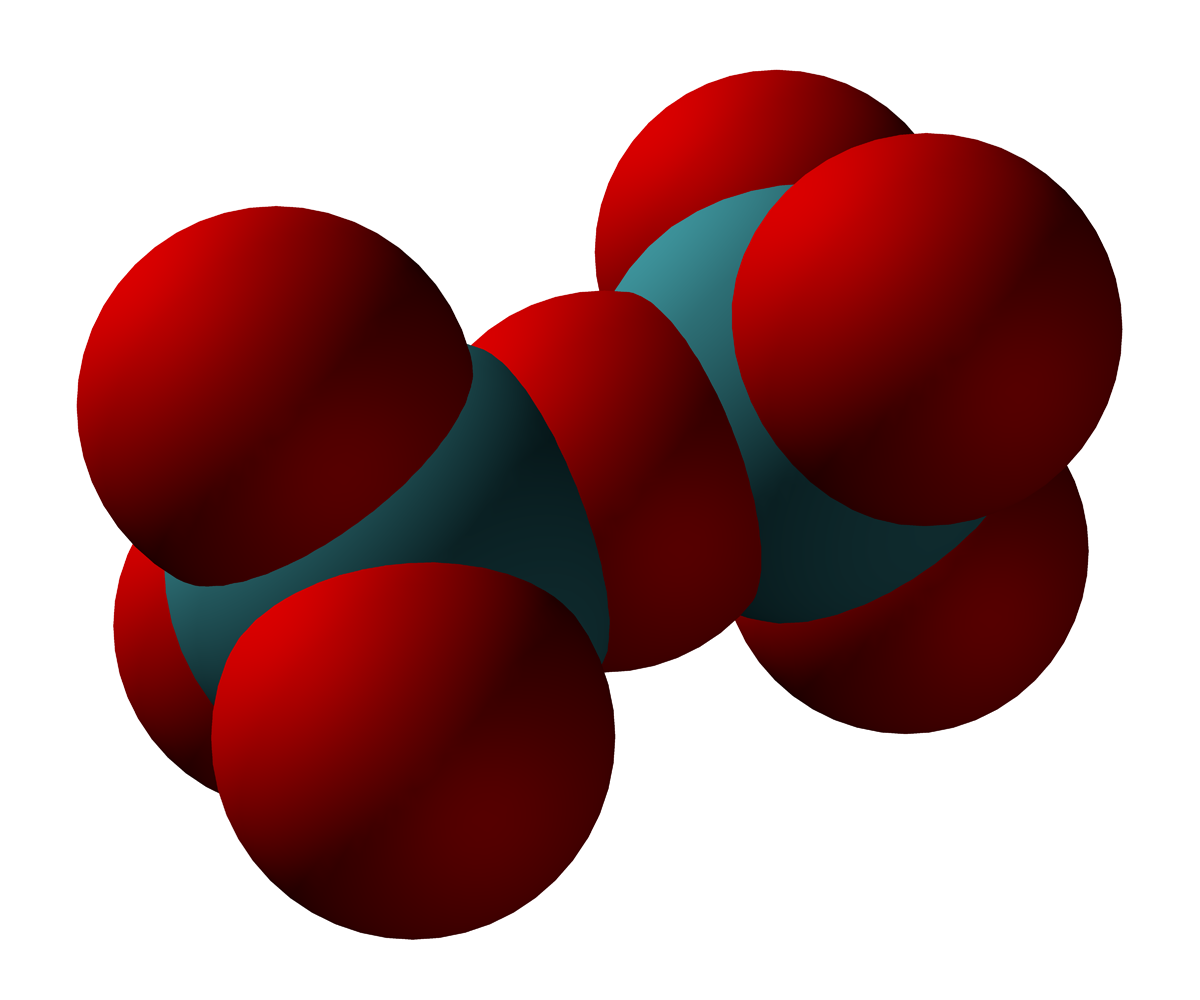

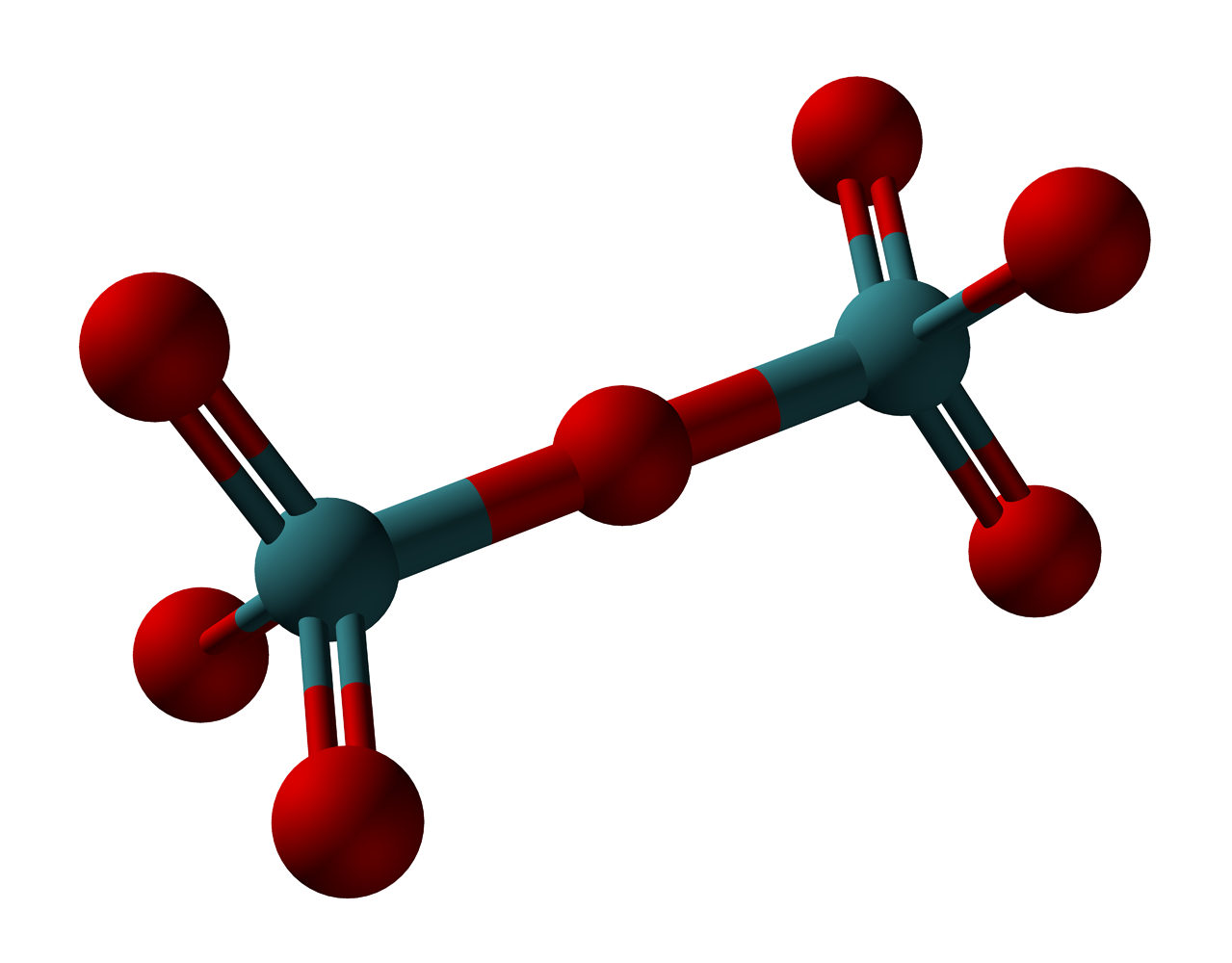

Names
- IUPAC name Technetium(VII) oxide
- Other names Technetium heptoxide

Identifiers
CAS Number	^{99}Tc: 12165-21-8
3D model (JSmol)	Interactive image
ChemSpider	73949000
PubChem CID	22227441
CompTox Dashboard (EPA)	DTXSID70153330
- InChI: Key: IOWOAQVVLHHFTL-UHFFFAOYSA-N; InChI=1S/7O.2Tc/q7*-2;2*+7
- SMILES: O=[Tc](=O)(=O)O[Tc](=O)(=O)=O

Properties
Chemical formula	Tc_{2}O_{7}
Molar mass	307.810 g/mol
Appearance	light yellow solid
Density	3.5 g/cm^{3}
Melting point	119.5 °C (247.1 °F; 392.6 K)
Boiling point	310.6 °C (591.1 °F; 583.8 K)
Solubility in water	hydrolysis to HTcO_{4}
Magnetic susceptibility (χ)	−40.0·10^{−6} cm^{3}/mol

Structure
Crystal structure	Primitive orthorhombic
Space group	Pbca, No. 61
Lattice constant	a = 1375.6 pm, b = 743.9 pm, c = 561.7 pm

Hazards
- Occupational safety and health (OHS/OSH)
Main hazards	radioactive
- Except where otherwise noted, data are given for materials in their standard state (at 25 °C [77 °F], 100 kPa). verify (what is ?) Infobox references

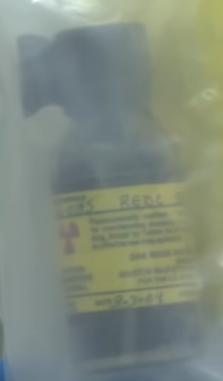
Technetium (VII) oxide containing Technetium-99

Technetium(VII) oxide is the chemical compound with the formula Tc_{2}O_{7}. This yellow volatile solid is a rare example of a molecular binary metal oxide, the other examples being RuO_{4}, OsO_{4}, and the unstable Mn_{2}O_{7}. It adopts a centrosymmetric corner-shared bi-tetrahedral structure in which the terminal and bridging Tc−O bonds are 167pm and 184 pm respectively and the Tc−O−Tc angle is 180°.

Technetium(VII) oxide is prepared by the oxidation of technetium at 450–500 °C:

4 Tc + 7 O_{2} → 2 Tc_{2}O_{7}

It is the anhydride of pertechnetic acid and the precursor to sodium pertechnetate:

Tc_{2}O_{7} + 2 H_{2}O → 2 HTcO_{4}
Tc_{2}O_{7} + 2 NaOH → 2 NaTcO_{4} + H_{2}O
