= Sodium pertechnetate =

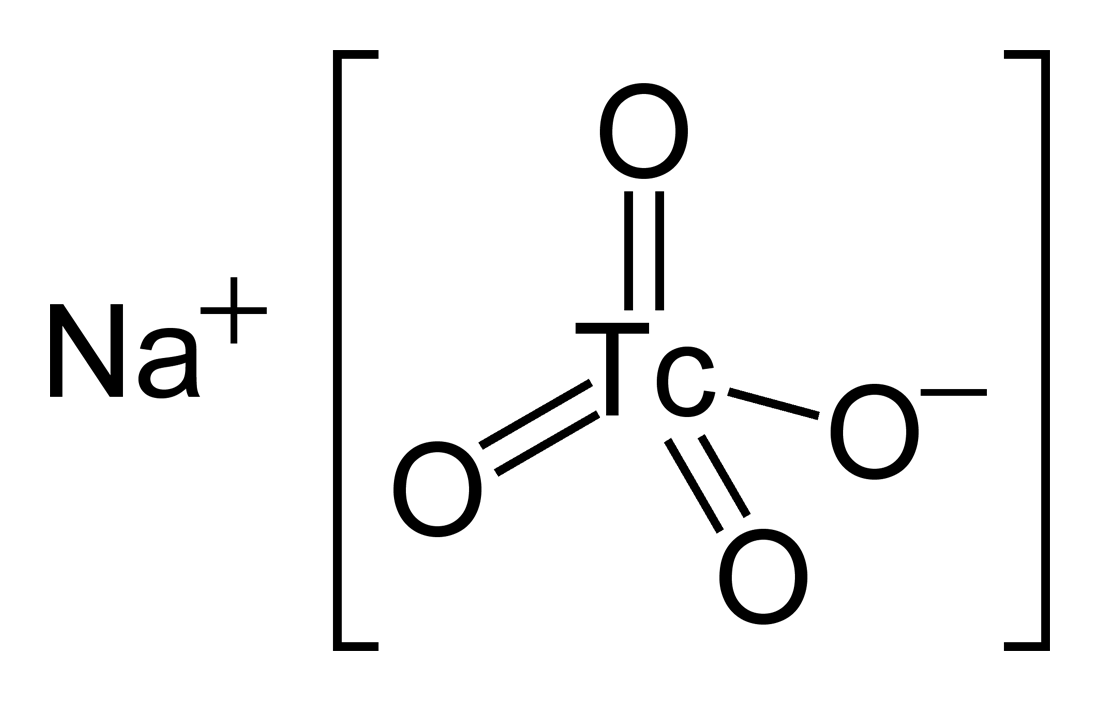

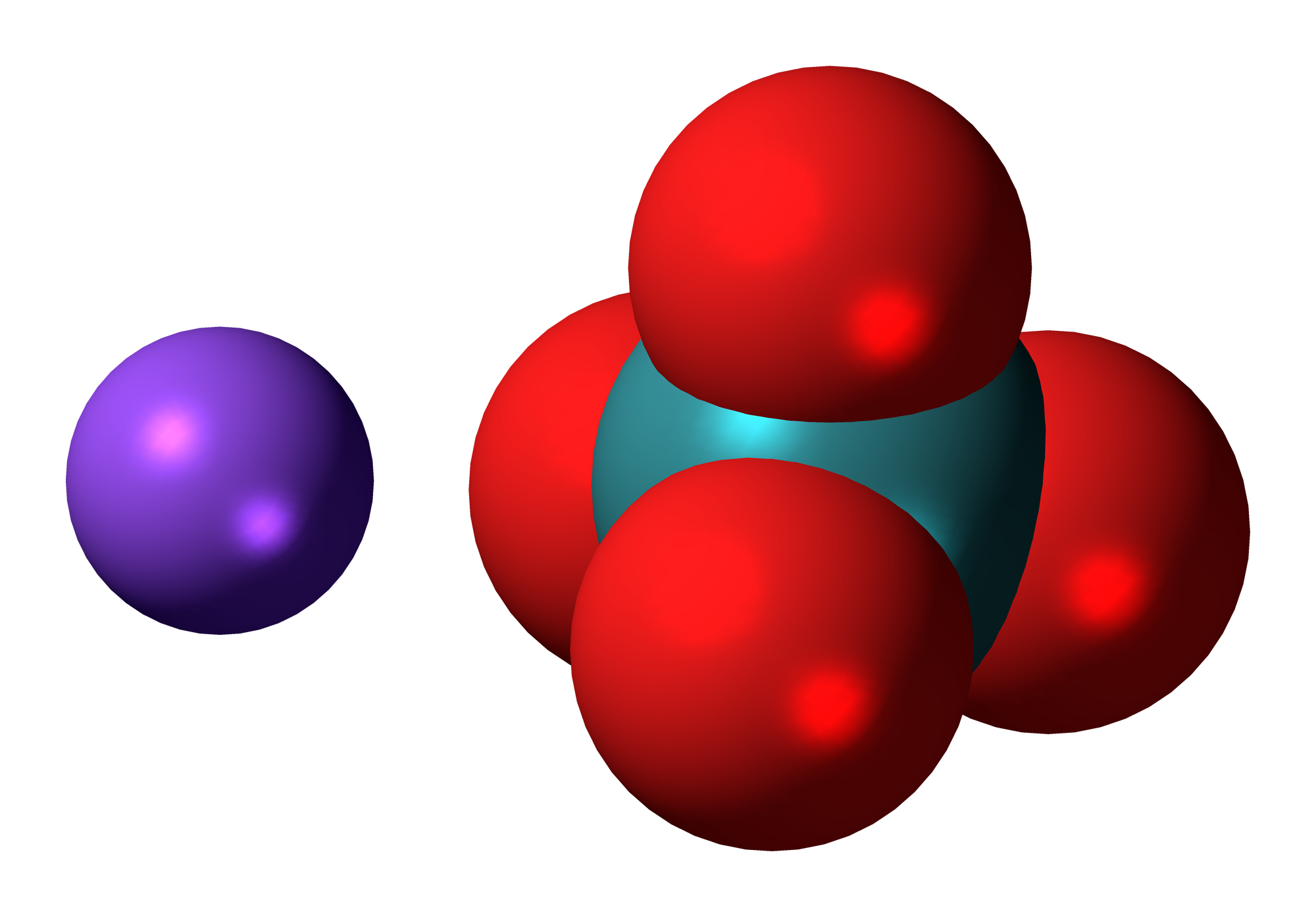

Names
- IUPAC name Sodium technetate(VII)
- Other names sodium tetraoxotechnetate (VII)

Identifiers
CAS Number	13718-28-0
3D model (JSmol)	Interactive image; ^{99}Tc: Interactive image
ChemSpider	64887107
ECHA InfoCard	100.033.870
EC Number	237-273-2
PubChem CID	74086836; ^{99}Tc: 23689036
UNII	A0730CX801
CompTox Dashboard (EPA)	DTXSID30894191
- InChI: InChI=1S/Na.4O.Tc/q+1;;;;-1; Key: MKADDTFVKFMZGF-UHFFFAOYSA-N
- SMILES: [Na+].[O-][Tc](=O)(=O)=O; ^{99}Tc: [O-][99Tc](=O)(=O)=O.[Na+]

Properties
Chemical formula	NaTcO_{4}
Molar mass	169.89 g/mol
Appearance	White or pale pink solid
Melting point	< 1,063 K (790 °C; 1,454 °F)
Solubility in water	Soluble

Structure
Crystal structure	Scheelite
Space group	I4_{1}/a
Lattice constant	a = 5.3325(1) Å, c = 11.8503(3) Å
Formula units (Z)	4

Related compounds
Other anions	Sodium permanganate; sodium perrhenate
Other cations	Ammonium pertechnetate
Related compounds	Technetium heptoxide
- Except where otherwise noted, data are given for materials in their standard state (at 25 °C [77 °F], 100 kPa). verify (what is ?) Infobox references

Sodium pertechnetate is the inorganic compound with the formula NaTcO_{4}. This colourless salt contains the pertechnetate anion, TcO^{−}_{4} that has slightly distorted tetrahedron symmetry both at 296 K and at 100 K while the coordination polyhedron of the sodium cation is different from typical for scheelite structure. The radioactive ^{99m}TcO^{−}_{4} anion is an important radiopharmaceutical for diagnostic use. The advantages to ^{99m}Tc include its short half-life of 6 hours and the low radiation exposure to the patient, which allow a patient to be injected with activities of more than 30 millicuries (1,100 MBq). Na[^{99m}TcO_{4}] is a precursor to a variety of derivatives that are used to image different parts of the body.

== Chemistry ==
TcO^{−}_{4} is the starting material for most of the chemistry of technetium. Pertechnetate salts are usually colorless. TcO^{−}_{4} is produced by oxidizing technetium with nitric acid or with hydrogen peroxide. The pertechnetate anion is similar to the permanganate anion but is a weaker oxidizing agent. It is tetrahedral and diamagnetic. The standard electrode potential for TcO^{−}_{4}/TcO_{2} is only +0.738 V in acidic solution, as compared to +1.695 V for MnO^{−}_{4}/MnO_{2}. Because of its diminished oxidizing power, TcO^{−}_{4} is stable in alkaline solution. TcO^{−}_{4} is more similar to ReO^{−}_{4}. Depending on the reducing agent, TcO^{−}_{4} can be converted to derivatives containing Tc(VI), Tc(V), and Tc(IV). In the absence of strong complexing ligands, TcO^{−}_{4} is reduced to a +4 oxidation state via the formation of TcO_{2} hydrate.

== Pharmaceutical use ==
The half-life of ^{99m}Tc is long enough that labelling synthesis of the radiopharmaceutical and scintigraphic measurements can be performed without significant loss of radioactivity. The energy emitted from ^{99m}Tc is 140 keV, which allows for the study of deep body organs. Radiopharmaceuticals have no intended pharmacologic effect and are used in very low concentrations. Radiopharmaceuticals containing ^{99m}Tc are currently being applied in the determining morphology of organs, testing of organ function, and scintigraphic and emission tomographic imaging. The gamma radiation emitted by the radionuclide allows organs to be imaged in vivo tomographically. Currently, over 80% of radiopharmaceuticals used clinically are labelled with ^{99m}Tc. A majority of radiopharmaceuticals labelled with ^{99m}Tc are synthesized by the reduction of the pertechnetate ion in the presence of ligands chosen to confer organ specificity of the drug. The resulting ^{99m}Tc compound is then injected into the body and a "gamma camera" is focused on sections or planes in order to image the spatial distribution of the ^{99m}Tc.

=== Specific imaging applications ===
^{99m}Tc is used primarily in the study of the thyroid gland - its morphology, vascularity, and function. TcO^{−}_{4} and iodide, due to their comparable charge/radius ratio, are similarly incorporated into the thyroid gland. The pertechnetate ion is not incorporated into the thyroglobulin. It is also used in the study of blood perfusion, regional accumulation, and cerebral lesions in the brain, as it accumulates primarily in the choroid plexus.

Sodium pertechnetate cannot pass through the blood–brain barrier. In addition to the salivary and thyroid glands, ^{99m}TcO^{−}_{4} localizes in the stomach. ^{99m}TcO^{−}_{4} is renally eliminated for the first three days after being injected. After a scanning is performed, it is recommended that a patient drink large amounts of water in order to expedite elimination of the radionuclide. Other methods of ^{99m}TcO^{−}_{4} administration include intraperitoneal, intramuscular, subcutaneous, as well as orally. The behavior of the ^{99m}TcO^{−}_{4} ion is essentially the same, with small differences due to the difference in rate of absorption, regardless of the method of administration.

== Other reactions involving the pertechnetate ion ==
- Radiolysis of TcO^{−}_{4} in nitrate solutions proceeds through the reduction to TcO^{2−}_{4} which induces complex disproportionation processes:

$$\begin{array}{l}
\ce{{TcO4^-} + {e^-} -> TcO4^2-} \\
\ce{2TcO4^{2-} -> {TcO4^-} + Tc^V} \\
\ce{2Tc^V -> {TcO4^{2-}} + Tc^{IV}} \\
\ce{{Tc^V} + TcO4^{2-} -> {Tc^{IV}} + TcO4-}
\end{array}$$

- Pertechnetate can react with H_{2}S to give Tc_{2}S_{7}.
- Pertechnetate can also be reduced to Tc(IV/V) compounds in alkaline solutions in nuclear waste tanks without adding catalytic metals, reducing agents, or external radiation. Reactions of mono- and disaccharides with ^{99m}TcO^{−}_{4} yield Tc(IV) compounds that are water-soluble.
