= Manganese(III) fluoride =

Chemical compound

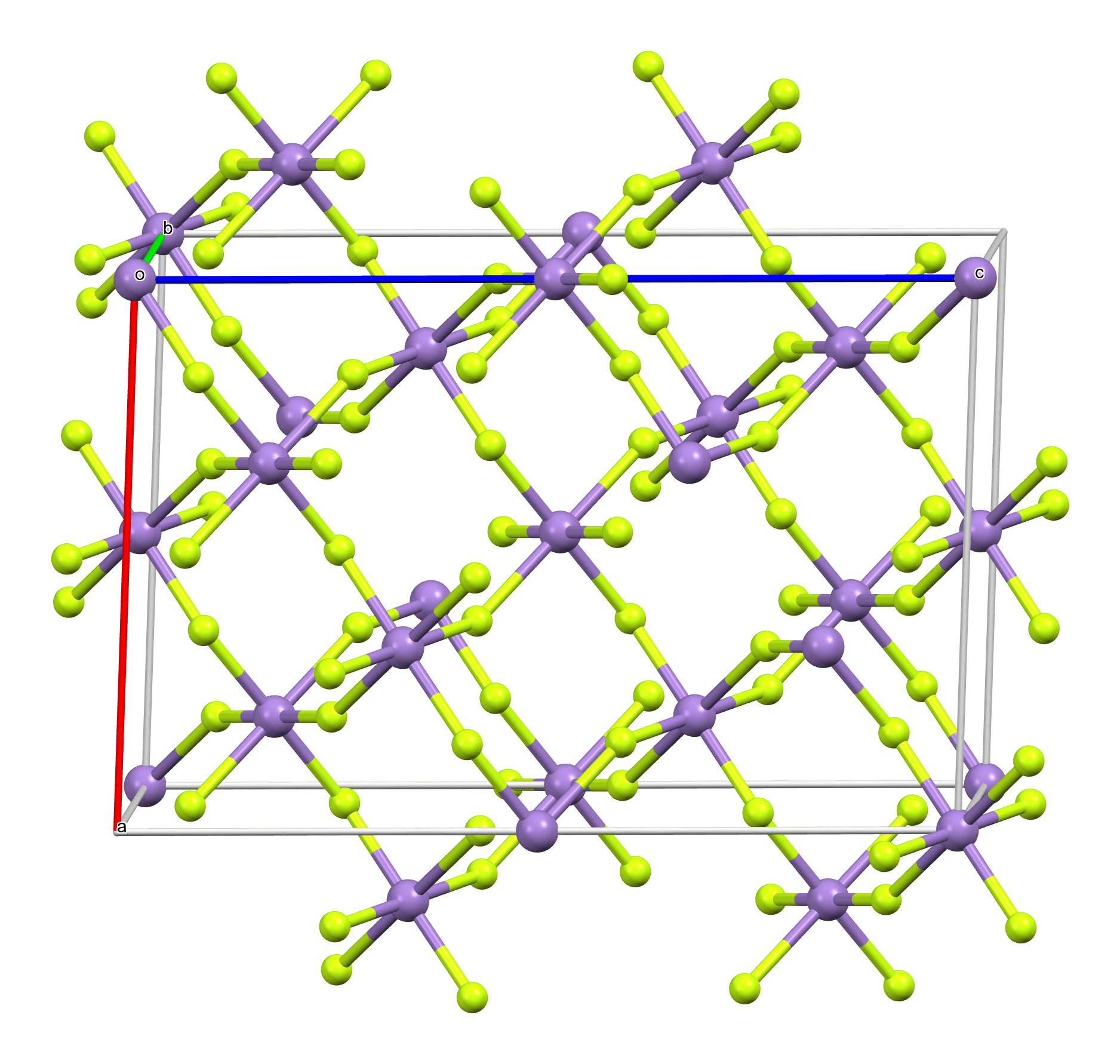
- Manganese(III) fluoride

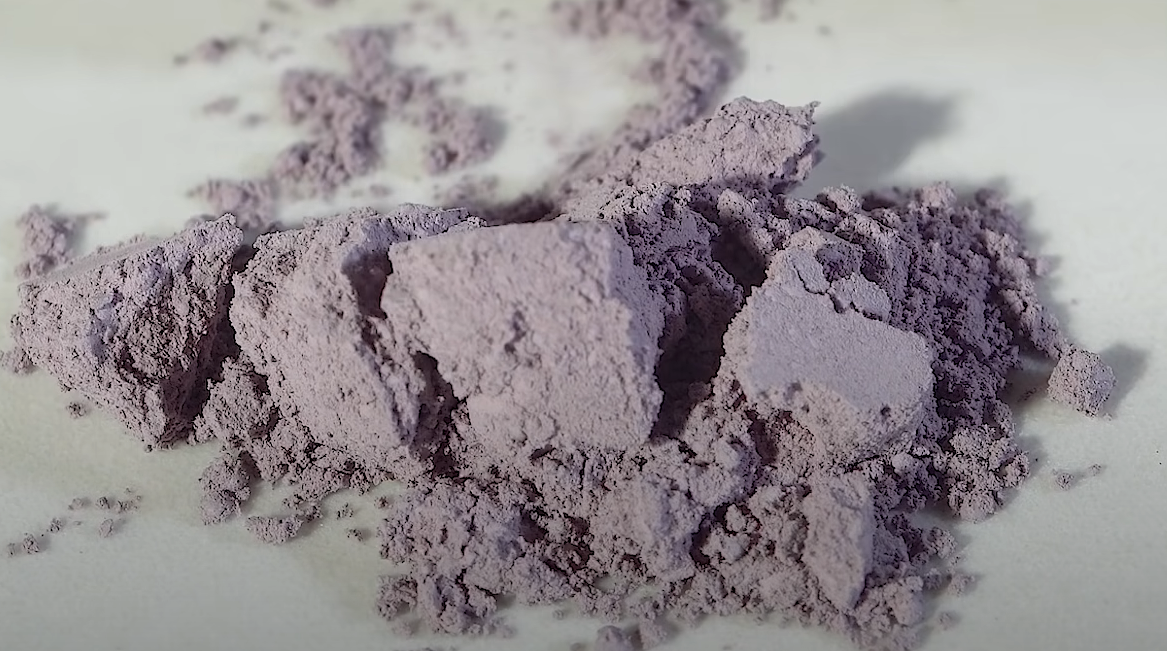

Names
- IUPAC name Manganese(III) fluoride
- Other names Manganese trifluoride, manganic fluoride

Identifiers
CAS Number	7783-53-1
3D model (JSmol)	Interactive image
ChemSpider	74193
ECHA InfoCard	100.029.096
EC Number	232-006-6
PubChem CID	82213
RTECS number	OP0882600
UNII	VHG84D268X
CompTox Dashboard (EPA)	DTXSID50893904
- InChI: InChI=1S/3FH.Mn/h3*1H;/q;;;+3/p-3 Key: SRVINXWCFNHIQZ-UHFFFAOYSA-K; InChI=1/3FH.Mn/h3*1H;/q;;;+3/p-3 Key: SRVINXWCFNHIQZ-DFZHHIFOAX
- SMILES: [Mn+3].[F-].[F-].[F-]

Properties
Chemical formula	MnF_{3}
Molar mass	111.938 g/mol
Appearance	purple-pink powder hygroscopic
Density	3.54 g/cm^{3}
Melting point	> 600 °C (1,112 °F; 873 K) (decomposes)
Solubility in water	hydrolysis
Magnetic susceptibility (χ)	+10,500·10^{−6} cm^{3}/mol

Structure
Crystal structure	Monoclinic, mS48
Space group	C2/c, No. 15
Coordination geometry	distorted octahedral

Hazards
- Occupational safety and health (OHS/OSH)
Main hazards	toxic fumes
- GHS labelling
Pictograms	(GHS03: Oxidizing) (GHS06: Toxic)
Signal word	Danger
Hazard statements	H272, H301, H312, H315, H319, H332, H335
Precautionary statements	P220, P261, P280, P301+P310, P305+P351+P338

Related compounds
Other anions	manganese(III) oxide, manganese(III) acetate
Other cations	chromium(III) fluoride, iron(III) fluoride. cobalt(III) fluoride
Related compounds	manganese(II) fluoride, manganese(IV) fluoride
- Except where otherwise noted, data are given for materials in their standard state (at 25 °C [77 °F], 100 kPa). verify (what is ?) Infobox references

Manganese(III) fluoride (also known as manganese trifluoride) is the inorganic compound with the formula MnF_{3}. This red/purplish solid is useful for converting hydrocarbons into fluorocarbons, i.e., it is a fluorination agent. It forms a hydrate and many derivatives.

== Synthesis, structure and reactions ==
MnF_{3} can be prepared by treating a solution of MnF_{2} in hydrogen fluoride with fluorine:

MnF_{2} + 0.5 F_{2} → MnF_{3}

It can also be prepared by the reaction of elemental fluorine with a manganese(II) halide at ~250 °C.

=== Structure ===
Like vanadium(III) fluoride, MnF_{3} features octahedral metal centers with the same average M-F bond distances. In the Mn compound, however, is distorted (and hence a monoclinic unit cell vs. a higher symmetry one) due to the Jahn-Teller effect, with pairs of Mn-F distances of 1.79, 1.91, 2.09 Å.

The hydrate MnF_{3}^{.}3H_{2}O is obtained by crystallisation of MnF_{3} from hydrofluoric acid. The hydrate exists as two polymorphs, with space groups P2_{1}/c and P2_{1}/a. Each consists of the salt [Mn(H_{2}O)_{4}F_{2}]^{+}[Mn(H_{2}O)_{2}F_{4}]^{−} ).

=== Reactions ===
MnF_{3} is Lewis acidic and forms a variety of derivatives. One example is K_{2}MnF_{3}(SO_{4}). MnF_{3} reacts with sodium fluoride to give the octahedral hexafluoride:

3NaF + MnF_{3} → Na_{3}MnF_{6}

Related reactions salts of the anions MnF_{5}^{2−} or MnF_{4}^{−}. These anions adopt chain and layer structures respectively, with bridging fluoride. Manganese remains 6 coordinate, octahedral, and trivalent in all of these materials.

Manganese(III) fluoride fluorinates organic compounds including aromatic hydrocarbons, cyclobutenes, and fullerenes.

On heating, MnF_{3} decomposes to manganese(II) fluoride.

MnF_{3} is a source of MnCl_{3} complexes by reaction with bismuth trichloride.

== See also ==
- CoF_{3}, another fluorinating agent based on a transition metal in an oxidising +3 state.
