= 2-(2-(4-Methyl-3-cyclohexen-1-yl)propyl)cyclopentanone =

- Structure without shown stereo chemistry

Names
- Preferred IUPAC name 2-[2-(4-Methylcyclohex-3-en-1-yl)propyl]cyclopentan-1-one
- Other names methylcyclohexenylpropyl-cyclopentanone (INCI); Nectaryl

Identifiers
CAS Number	95962-14-4
3D model (JSmol)	Interactive image
ChEMBL	ChEMBL3728992
ChemSpider	153032
ECHA InfoCard	100.100.590
EC Number	404-240-0
PubChem CID	175661
UNII	P1K3Z8A8HJ
CompTox Dashboard (EPA)	DTXSID3052646
- InChI: InChI=1S/C15H24O/c1-11-6-8-13(9-7-11)12(2)10-14-4-3-5-15(14)16/h6,12-14H,3-5,7-10H2,1-2H3 Key: KNHGOYVXAHUDHP-UHFFFAOYSA-N
- SMILES: CC1=CCC(CC1)C(C)CC2CCCC2=O

Properties
Chemical formula	C_{15}H_{24}O
Molar mass	220.35 g·mol^{−1}
Appearance	viscous liquid with fruity odor
Density	0.96 g·cm^{−3} (22 °C)
Melting point	−41.8 °C (−43.2 °F; 231.3 K)
Boiling point	288 °C (550 °F; 561 K)
Solubility in water	practically insoluble in water (4.6 mg·l^{−1} at 20 °C)

Hazards
- GHS labelling
Pictograms	(GHS09: Environmental hazard)
Signal word	Warning
Hazard statements	H410
Precautionary statements	P273, P391, P501
- Lethal dose or concentration (LD, LC)
LC_{50} (median concentration)	5.47 mg·L^{−1} (zebrafish)
- Safety data sheet (SDS)
- Except where otherwise noted, data are given for materials in their standard state (at 25 °C [77 °F], 100 kPa). Infobox references

2-[2-(4-Methyl-3-cyclohexen-1-yl)propyl]cyclopentanone (trade name by Givaudan: Nectaryl) is an organic compound belonging to the group of ketones and cycloalkanes. The compound is used as a fragrance.

== Synthesis ==
The synthesis of the compound is carried out by a radical addition of cyclopentanone to (+)-limonene under oxygen in acetic acid. As a catalyst, manganese(II) acetate and cobalt(II) acetate are used.

== Properties ==
The flash point of the compound is 162.5 °C, and the autoignition temperature is 294 °C. The specific rotation is reported to be [α]_{D}^{20}=+228–235° (1 M; chloroform)

In general, the compound features a fruity apricot-like odor. Of the four stereo isomers, (2R,2′S,1′′R)-Nectaryl and (2R,2′R,1′′R)-Nectaryl contribute especially to the compound's odor, the odor detection threshold lies at 0.094 ng·l^{−1} and 0.112 ng·l^{−1}, respectively. In contrast to that, the other stereo isomers show an unspecific fruity odor, the odor detection threshold are 11.2 ng·l^{−1} and 14.9 ng·l^{−1} which is much higher.

The tenacity on blotter, the time during which the compound is smellable with unchanged characteristics, is reported to be three weeks.

== Uses ==
The substance is used as a fragrance in exemplary air conditioning products, perfumes and polishes.
