= Manganese(II) acetate =

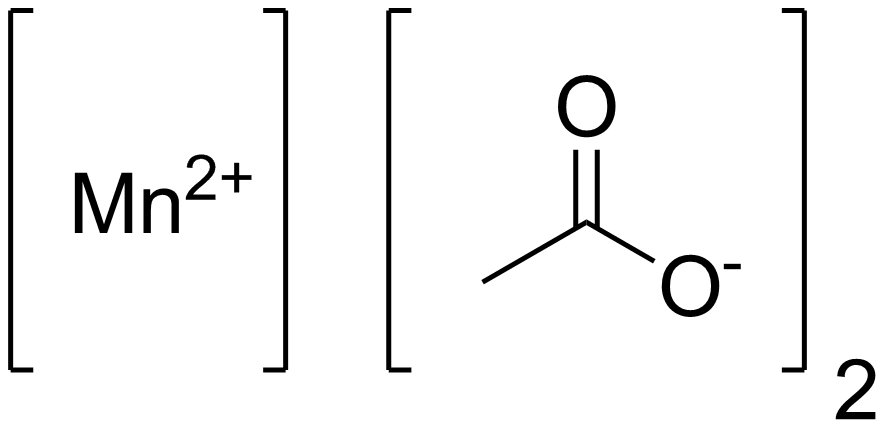

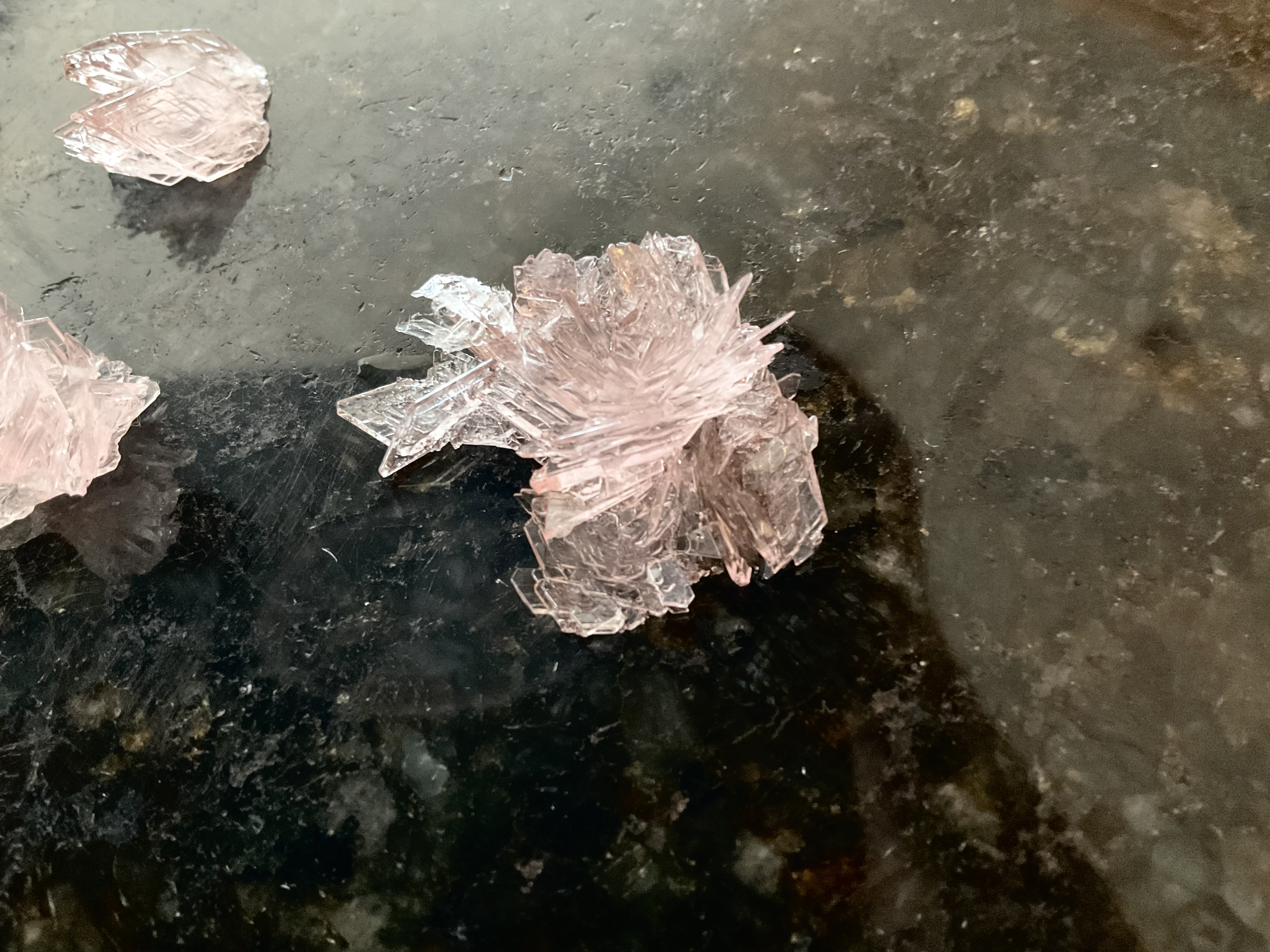

Names
- IUPAC name Manganese(II) acetate
- Other names Manganese diacetate

Identifiers
CAS Number	638-38-0 (anhydrous); 19513-05-4 (dihydrate); 6156-78-1 (tetrahydrate)
3D model (JSmol)	Interactive image
ChemSpider	12008
ECHA InfoCard	100.010.305
PubChem CID	12525
UNII	0V6E9Q2I0Y (anhydrous); 9TO51D176N (tetrahydrate)
CompTox Dashboard (EPA)	DTXSID5027279
- InChI: InChI=1S/2C2H4O2.Mn/c2*1-2(3)4;/h2*1H3,(H,3,4);/q;;+2/p-2 Key: UOGMEBQRZBEZQT-UHFFFAOYSA-L
- SMILES: CC([O-])=O.CC([O-])=O.[Mn+2]

Properties
Chemical formula	Mn(CH_{3}CO_{2})_{2} (anhydrous); Mn(CH_{3}CO_{2})_{2}·4H_{2}O (tetrahydrate)
Molar mass	173.027 g/mol (anhydrous); 245.087 g/mol (tetrahydrate)
Appearance	white crystals (anhydrous) light pink monoclinic crystals (tetrahydrate)
Density	1.74 g/cm^{3} (anhydrous); 1.59 g/cm^{3} (tetrahydrate)
Melting point	210 °C (410 °F; 483 K) (anhydrous); 80 °C (tetrahydrate)
Solubility	soluble in water (about 700g/L at 20°C for tetrahydrate), methanol, acetic acid (anhydrous) soluble in water, ethanol (tetrahydrate)
Magnetic susceptibility (χ)	+13,650·10^{−6} cm^{3}/mol

Hazards
NFPA 704 (fire diamond)	1 0 0
Flash point	> 130 °C (266 °F; 403 K) (tetrahydrate)
- Lethal dose or concentration (LD, LC)
LD_{50} (median dose)	2940 mg/kg (rat, oral)

Related compounds
Other anions	Manganese(II) fluoride Manganese(II) chloride Manganese(II) bromide
Other cations	Zinc acetate Mercury(II) acetate Silver acetate
- Except where otherwise noted, data are given for materials in their standard state (at 25 °C [77 °F], 100 kPa). verify (what is ?) Infobox references

Manganese(II) acetate are chemical compounds with the formula Mn(CH_{3}CO_{2})_{2}·(H_{2}O)n where n = 0, 2, 4. These materials are white or pale pink solids. Some of these compounds are used as a catalyst and as fertilizer.

== Preparation ==
Manganese(II) acetate can be formed by treating either manganese(II,III) oxide or manganese(II) carbonate with acetic acid:

Mn_{3}O_{4} + 2 CH_{3}CO_{2}H → Mn(CH_{3}CO_{2})_{2} + Mn_{2}O_{3} + H_{2}O
MnCO_{3} + 2 CH_{3}CO_{2}H → Mn(CH_{3}CO_{2})_{2} + CO_{2} + H_{2}O

== Structure ==
The anhydrous material and dihydrate Mn(CH_{3}CO_{2})_{2}·2H_{2}O are coordination polymers. The dihydrate has been characterized by X-ray crystallography. Each Mn(II) center is surrounded by six oxygen centers provided by aquo ligands and acetates.

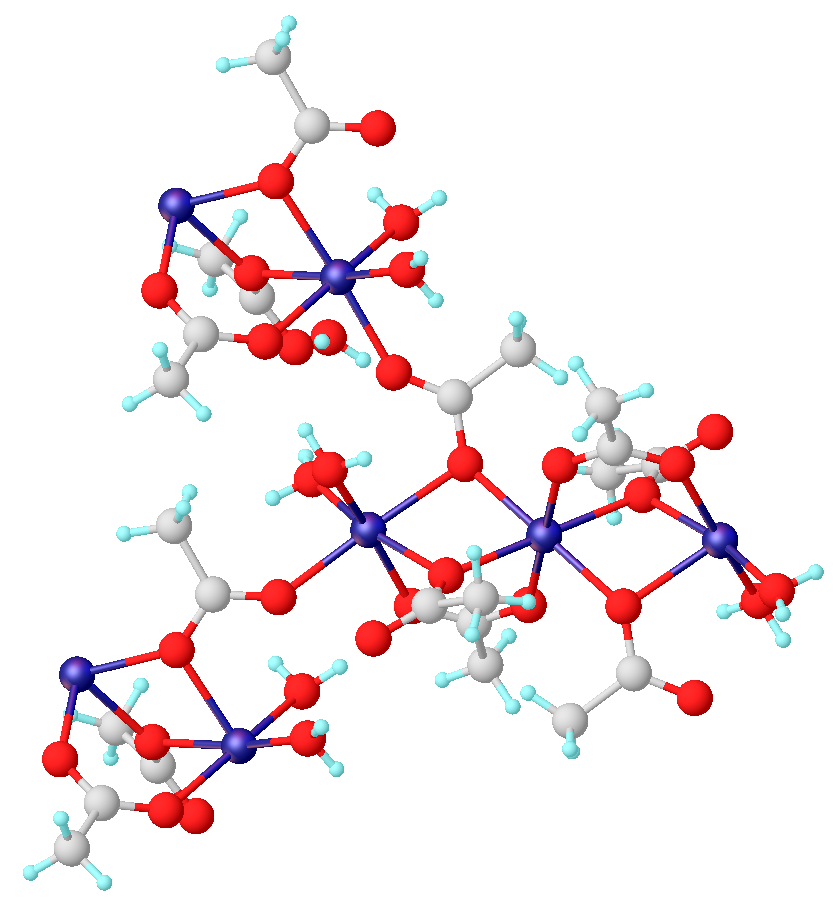
Subunit of the structure of the dihydrate of manganese(II) acetate.

== Compounds with similar stoichiometry ==
- Manganese(III) acetate, which differs in many respects from manganese(II) acetate, is a reagent in organic chemistry
- Chromium(II) acetate, which has similar formula to manganese(II) acetate, is a covalent complex with metal-metal bonds
