= Bis(triphenylphosphineoxide) manganese(III) chloride =

manganese(III) chloride, bis(triphenylphopshine oxide)
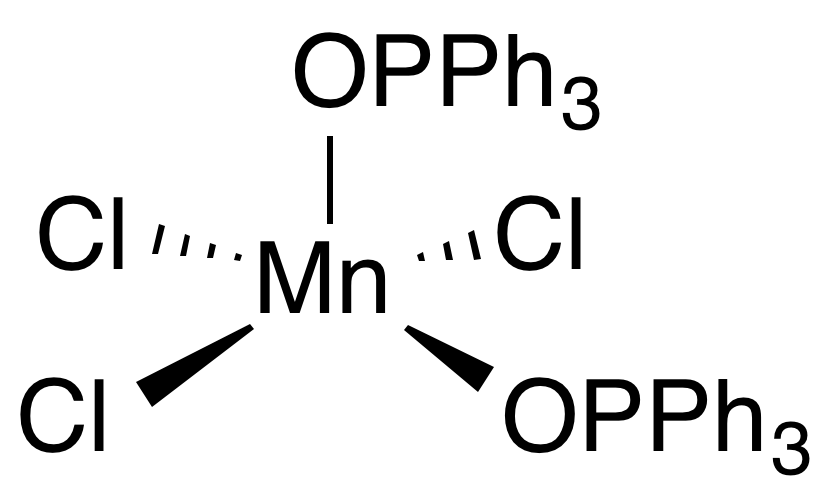

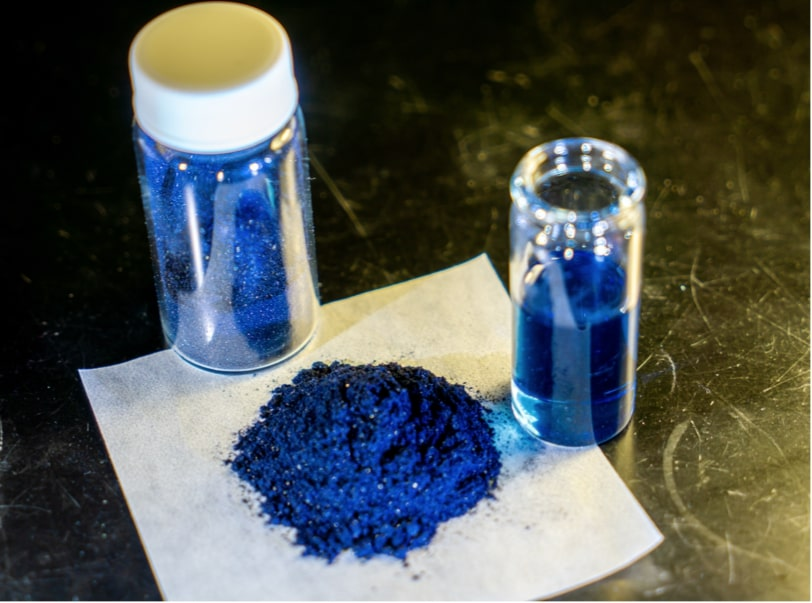

Names
- Systematic IUPAC name trichloridobis(triphenylphopshineoxide)manganese(III)
- Other names MnCl_{3}(OPPh_{3})_{2}

Identifiers
CAS Number	61301-74-4
3D model (JSmol)	Interactive image
- InChI: InChI=1S/2C18H15OP.3ClH.Mn/c2*19-20(16-10-4-1-5-11-16,17-12-6-2-7-13-17)18-14-8-3-9-15-18;;;;/h2*1-15H;3*1H;/q;;;;;+3/p-3 Key: QFCMPBNNKDBSLH-UHFFFAOYSA-K
- SMILES: Cl[Mn-2](Cl)(O[P+](c1ccccc1)(c2ccccc2)c3ccccc3)(Cl)O[P+](c1ccccc1)(c2ccccc2)c3ccccc3

Properties
Chemical formula	C_{36}H_{30}Cl_{3}MnO_{2}P_{2}
Molar mass	717.87 g·mol^{−1}
Appearance	blue solid
Melting point	140 °C (284 °F; 413 K) (with decomposition)
Magnetic susceptibility (χ)	μ_{eff} = 4.96 μ_{B.H.} (solid-state), 4.83 μ_{B.H.} (DCM)
- Except where otherwise noted, data are given for materials in their standard state (at 25 °C [77 °F], 100 kPa). Infobox references

Bis(triphenylphosphineoxide) manganese(III) chloride is a coordination complex of manganese(III) chloride. Unlike most compounds containing "Mn(III)Cl_{3}", [MnCl_{3}(OPPh_{3})_{2}] can be stored under normal laboratory conditions. It is a blue, paramagnetic solid.

== Synthesis and reactions ==
Treatment of meta-stable solutions of Mn(III)Cl_{3} with triphenylphosphine oxide results in precipitation of solid [MnCl_{3}(OPPh_{3})_{2}]. This compound was first prepared using the thermally unstable ethereal adduct Mn^{III}(dioxane)Cl_{3}. A convenient synthesis starts from Mn(OAc)_{2}, trimethylsilylchloride, and potassium permanganate.

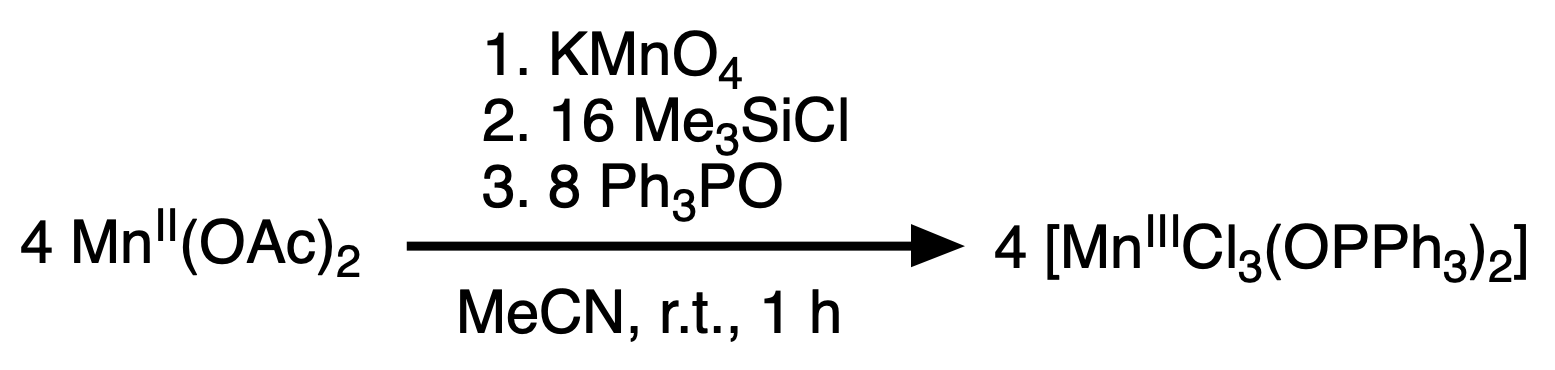

[MnCl_{3}(OPPh_{3})_{2}] can be used as a starting material in coordination chemistry.

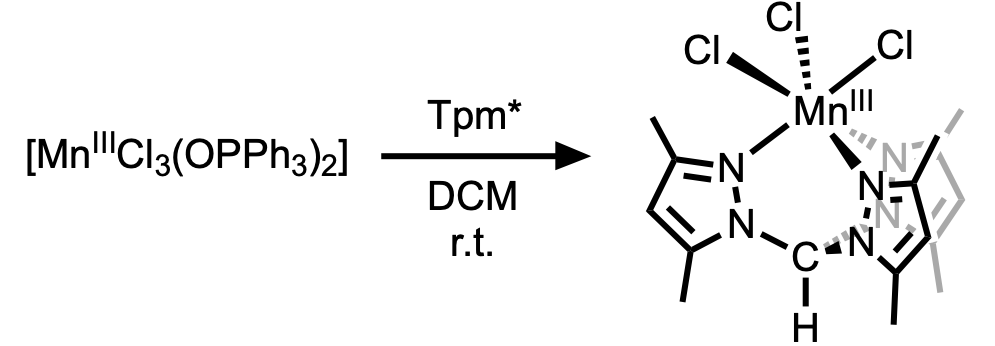

[MnCl_{3}(OPPh_{3})_{2}] can also be used as a stoichiometric reagent in alkene dihalogenation reactions.

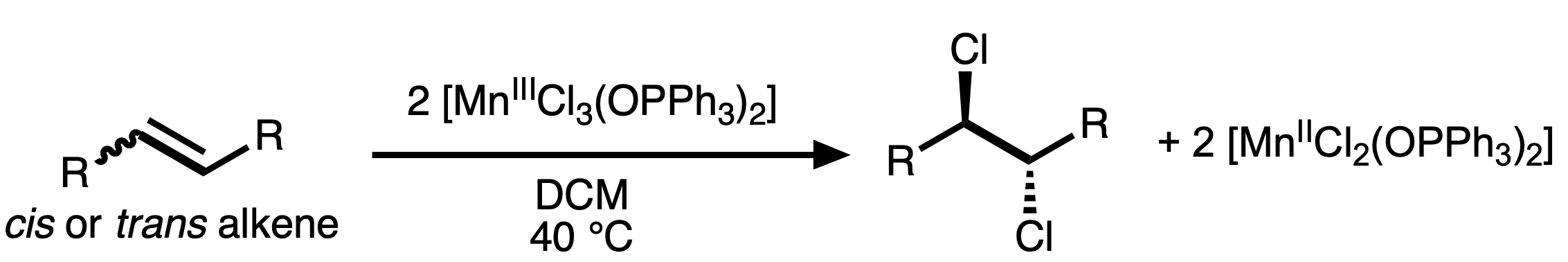
