= Manganese(IV) chloride =

Manganese tetrachloride
Names
- Other names: Manganese(IV) chloride

Identifiers
3D model (JSmol)	Interactive image
ChemSpider	8139950
PubChem CID	51738
- InChI: InChI=1S/4ClH.Mn/h4*1H;/p-4 Key: LTJBOUZUHSXYCG-UHFFFAOYSA-J
- SMILES: [Cl-].[Cl-].[Cl-].[Cl-].[Mn]

Properties
Chemical formula	Cl_{4}Mn
Molar mass	196.74 g·mol^{−1}
Appearance	brown solution
Melting point	−26 °C (−15 °F; 247 K)
Solubility in water	Soluble, reacts
- Except where otherwise noted, data are given for materials in their standard state (at 25 °C [77 °F], 100 kPa). Infobox references

Manganese tetrachloride is a binary inorganic compound of manganese and chlorine with the chemical formula MnCl_{4}.

== Synthesis ==
Pure manganese(IV) chloride has never been isolated. According to Holleman and Wiberg (2016), it is likely to be an intermediate in the reaction between manganese dioxide and hydrogen chloride gas:

MnO_{2} + 4 HCl → MnCl_{4} + 2 H_{2}O
MnCl_{4} → MnCl_{2} + Cl_{2}

Earlier works claim the compound is formed by treating manganese dioxide with cold, concentrated hydrochloric acid, resulting in a dark-brown solution.

Other reactions with higher oxides are also possible:

Mn_{2}O_{3} + 6 HCl → MnCl_{4} + MnCl_{2} + 3H_{2}O
Mn_{3}O_{4} + 8 HCl → MnCl_{4} + 2 MnCl_{2} + 4H_{2}O

MnCl_{4} is thermally unstable and liberates chlorine gas during these reactions and in solution at STP.

== Physical properties ==
The metal chloride is a highly unstable, dark-brown compound that easily decomposes, though a stable form can exist in solution at low temperatures, usually in the form of MnCl^{2−}_{6} or MnCl^{−}_{5} coordination-complex anions with excess HCl/H_{3}O^{+} which then decompose favorably on formation of neutral MnCl_{4}. MnCl_{4} is often distinguished from the more common and stable manganese(II) chloride (MnCl_{2}).

== Reactions ==
A reagent for the α-chlorination of enolizable ketones, derived from the reaction of manganese(IV) oxide with chlorotrimethylsilane ((CH_{3})_{3}SiCl) or acetyl chloride (CH_{3}COCl), is claimed to contain manganese(IV) chloride.
