= MNAC =

MNAC may refer to:

- Museu Nacional de Arte Contemporânea in Lisbon, Portugal
- National Museum of Contemporary Art (Muzeul Naţional de Artă Contemporană) in Bucharest, Romania
- Museu Nacional d'Art de Catalunya in Barcelona, Catalonia, Spain

MnAc may refer to:

- Manganese(III) acetate
