= Organomanganese chemistry =

Organomanganese chemistry is the chemistry of organometallic compounds containing a carbon to manganese chemical bond. In a 2009 review, Cahiez et al. argued that as manganese is cheap and benign (only iron performs better in these aspects), organomanganese compounds have potential as chemical reagents, although currently they are not widely used as such despite extensive research.

== Synthesis ==
Organomanganese compounds were first reported in 1937 by Gilman and Bailee who described the reaction of phenyllithium and manganese(II) iodide to form phenylmanganese iodide (PhMnI) and diphenylmanganese (Ph_{2}Mn).

Following this precedent, other organomanganese halides can be obtained by alkylation of manganese(II) chloride, manganese(II) bromide, and manganese(II) iodide. Manganese iodide is attractive because the anhydrous compound can be prepared in situ from manganese and iodine in ether. Typical alkylating agents are organolithium or organomagnesium compounds:

RM + MnX_{2}→ 2RMnX + MX
2RM + MnX_{2}→ R_{2}Mn + 2MX

A variety of organomanganates (the ate complex) are isolable:

3RM + MnX_{2}→ R_{3}MnX + 2MX
4RM + MnX_{2}→ R_{4}MnX_{2}+ 2MX

The organomanganese compounds are usually prepared in THF where they are the most stable (via complexation) even though many of them must be handled at low temperatures. Simple dialkylmanganese compounds decompose by beta-hydride elimination to a mixture of alkanes and alkenes.

=== Derivatives of Mn_{2}(CO)_{10} ===
Many organomanganese complexes are derived from dimanganese decacarbonyl, Mn_{2}(CO)_{10}. Bromination and reduction with lithium affords BrMn(CO)_{5} and LiMn(CO)_{5}, respectfully. These species are precursors to alkyl, aryl, and acyl derivatives:

BrMn(CO)_{5} + RLi → RMn(CO)_{5} + LiBr
LiMn(CO)_{5} + RC(O)Cl → RC(O)Mn(CO)_{5} + LiCl
RMn(CO)_{5} + CO → RC(O)Mn(CO)_{5}

The general pattern of reactivity is analogous to that for the more popular cyclopentadienyliron dicarbonyl dimer.

The Mn(I) compound BrMn(CO)_{5} is also the precursor to many pi-arene complexes:

BrMn(CO)_{5} + Ag^{+} + C_{6}R_{6} → [Mn(CO)_{3}(C_{6}R_{6})]^{+} + AgBr + 2 CO

These cationic half-sandwich complexes are susceptible to nucleophilic additions to give cyclohexadienyl derivatives and ultimated functionalized arenes.

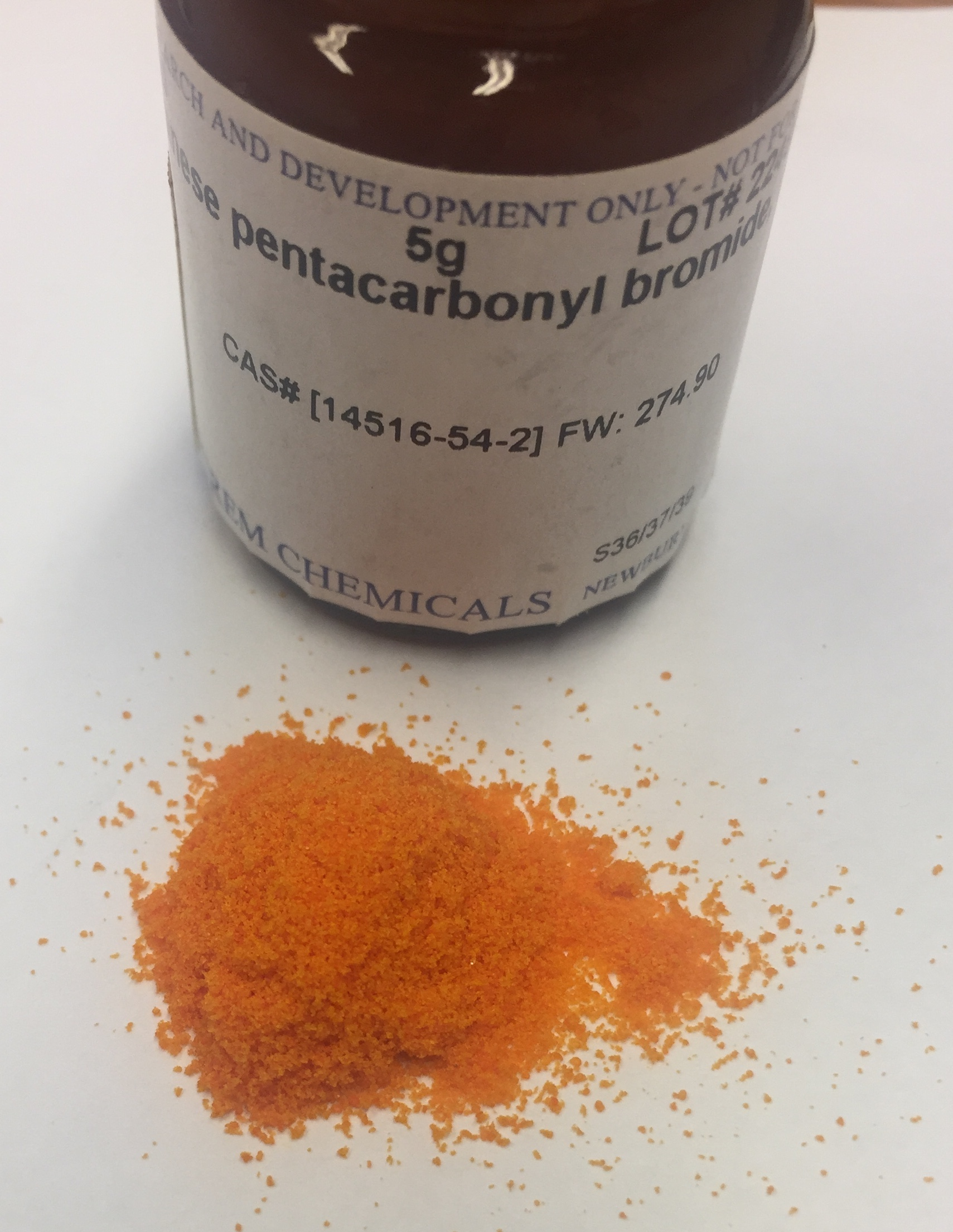
Sample of manganese pentacarbonyl bromide (BrMn(CO)_{5})

== Reactions ==
The chemistry of organometallic compounds of Mn(II) are unusual among the transition metals due to the high ionic character of the Mn(II)-C bond. The reactivity of organomanganese compounds can be compared to that of organomagnesium and organozinc compounds. The electronegativity of Mn (1.55) is comparable to that of Mg (1.31) and Zn (1.65), making the carbon atom (EN = 2.55) nucleophilic. The reduction potential of Mn is also intermediate between Mg and Zn.

Organomanganese halides react with aldehydes and ketones to the alcohol, with carbon dioxide to the carboxylic acid (tolerating higher operating temperature than corresponding RLi or RMgBr counterparts), sulfur dioxide and isocyanates behaving like soft Grignard reagents. They do not react with esters, nitriles, or amides. They are more sensitive to steric than to electronic effects.

With acyl halides RMnX compounds form the corresponding ketones. This reaction is chemoselective and has been applied in organic synthesis for this reason.

Certain manganese amides of the type RR^{1}NMnR^{2} are used for the deprotonation of ketones forming manganese enolates. Just like lithium enolates they can further react with silyl chlorides to silyl enol ethers, with alkyl halides in alpha-alkylation and with aldehydes and ketones to beta-keto-alcohols. Manganese enolates can also be obtained by transmetalation of manganese halides with Li, Mg, K or Na enolates.

Manganese halides are catalysts in several homo- and crosscoupling reactions involving stannanes and Grignards in which organomanganese intermediates play a part. Likewise coupling reactions involving organomanganese halides are catalysed by Pd, Ni, Cu and Fe compounds.

Manganese chloride is a precursor to organomanganese reagents in organic chemistry.

=== Activated manganese ===
Commercial manganese powder is not suited for the synthesis of organomanganese compounds. In 1996 Rieke introduced activated manganese (see Rieke metal) obtained by reaction of anhydrous manganese(II) chloride with lithium metal in a solution of a catalytic amount of naphthalene in THF. Other reducing agents are potassium graphite and magnesium. Activated manganese facilitates the Mn version of the Barbier reaction and the pinacol coupling.

== High-valent compounds ==
Several organomanganese compounds with valency +3 or +4 are known. The first one discovered (1972) was Mn(nor)_{4} with four norbornyl units. An octahedral [Mn^{IV}Me_{6}]^{−2} complex was reported in 1992, obtained by reaction of MnMe_{4}(PMe_{3}), with methyllithium followed by addition of TMED.

== See also ==
- Organorhenium chemistry
