= Manganese(III) chloride =

Names
- Other names: Manganese trichloride

Identifiers
3D model (JSmol)	Interactive image
ChemSpider	8329698
PubChem CID	12029980
- InChI: InChI=1S/3ClH.Mn/h3*1H;/q;;;+3/p-3 Key: UDBAOKKMUMKEGZ-UHFFFAOYSA-K
- SMILES: Cl[Mn](Cl)Cl

Properties
Chemical formula	MnCl_{3}
Molar mass	161.30 g/mol
Melting point	−18 °C (0 °F; 255 K)

Related compounds
Related compounds	Manganese(II) chloride, Manganese(III) fluoride, Bis(triphenylphosphineoxide) manganese(III) chloride, Manganese(III) acetate, Manganese(III) acetylacetonate
- Except where otherwise noted, data are given for materials in their standard state (at 25 °C [77 °F], 100 kPa). Infobox references

Manganese(III) chloride is the hypothetical inorganic compound with the formula MnCl_{3}.

The existence of this binary halide has not been demonstrated. Nonetheless, many derivatives of MnCl_{3} are known, such as MnCl_{3}(THF)_{3} and the bench-stable MnCl_{3}(OPPh_{3})_{2}. Contrasting with the elusive nature of MnCl_{3}, trichlorides of the adjacent metals on the periodic table—iron(III) chloride, chromium(III) chloride, and technetium(III) chloride—are all isolable compounds.

== History of MnCl_{3} and its adducts ==
MnCl_{3} was claimed to be a dark solid and produced by the reaction of "anhydrous manganese(III) acetate" and liquid hydrogen chloride at −100 °C and decomposes above -40 °C. Other claims involved reaction of manganese(III) oxide, manganese(III) oxide-hydroxide, and basic manganese acetate with hydrochloric acid. Given recent investigations however, such claims have been disproved or called into serious doubt. Specifically, all known compounds containing MnCl_{3} are known to be solvent or ligand-stabilized adducts.

=== Adducts ===
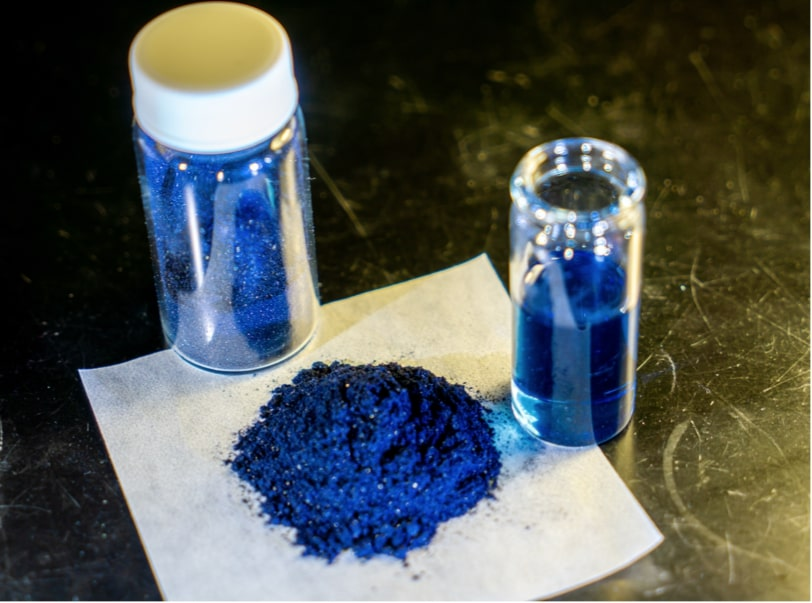
MnCl_{3}(OPPh_{3})_{2}, a stable derivative form of MnCl_{3}

MnCl_{3} can be stabilized by complexation to diverse Lewis bases, as has been established over the course of many years of study. Meta stable acetonitrile-solvated Mn(III)Cl_{3} can be prepared at room temperature by treating [Mn_{12}O_{12}(OAc)_{16}(H_{2}O)_{4}] with trimethylsilyl chloride. The treatment of permanganate salts with trimethylsilylchloride generates solutions containing Mn(III)–Cl species for alkene dichlorination reactions; electrocatalytic methods that use Mn(III)–Cl intermediates have been developed for the same purpose.

The reaction of manganese dioxide with hydrochloric acid in tetrahydrofuran gives MnCl_{3}(H_{2}O)(THF)_{2}. Manganese(III) fluoride suspended in THF reacts with boron trichloride, giving MnCl_{3}(THF)_{3} which has the appearance of dark purple prisms. This compound has a monoclinic crystal structure, reacts with water, and decomposes at room temperature.

The most readily handled of this series of adducts is MnCl_{3}(OPPh_{3})_{2}.

=== Pentachloromanganate(III) ===
Another common manganese(III) chloride compound is the pentachloromanganate(III) dianion. It is usually charge balanced with counterion(s) like tetraethylammonium. The pentachloromanganates are typically green in color, light sensitive, maintain pentacoordination in solution, and have S = 2 ground states at room temperature. Crystal structures of pentachloromanganate indicate the anion is square pyramidal. Tetraethylammonium pentachloromanganate(III), [Et_{4}N]_{2}[MnCl_{5}], can be prepared and isolated by treating suspension of [Mn_{12}O_{12}(OAc)_{16}(H_{2}O)_{4}] in diethyl ether with trimethylsilylchloride, collecting the resulting purple solid in the dark, and then treating this solid with 0.6 M solution of tetraethylammonium chloride. The green product is air stable but should be kept in the dark.

== Manganese(III) monochloride compounds ==
Some manganese compounds with macrocyclic tetradentate coordination can stabilize the manganese(III) monochloride, Mn(III)–Cl, moiety. Jacobson's catalyst is an example of a coordination compound containing the Mn(III)–Cl moiety and is stabilized by N,N,O,O coordination from a salen ligand. Jacobson's catalyst and related Mn(III)–Cl complexes react with O-atom transfer reagents to form high-valent Mn(V)O that are reactive in alkene epoxidation. Tetraphenylporphyrin Mn(III)Cl is a related commercially available compound.

== Other manganese(III) chloride complexes ==
- Bis(triphenylphosphineoxide) manganese(III) chloride
