= Manganocene =

Names
- Other names Bis(cyclopentadienyl)manganese

Identifiers
CAS Number	73138-26-8; 1271-27-8
3D model (JSmol)	Interactive image
ChemSpider	29368716
ECHA InfoCard	100.149.777
EC Number	620-873-7
PubChem CID	21960473
CompTox Dashboard (EPA)	DTXSID50993877
- InChI: InChI=1S/2C5H5.Mn/c2*1-2-4-5-3-1;/h2*1-3H,4H2;/q2*-1;+2 Key: LCGVCXIFXLGLHG-UHFFFAOYSA-N
- SMILES: c1[cH-]ccc1.[Mn+2].c1[cH-]ccc1

Properties
Chemical formula	C_{10}H_{10}Mn
Molar mass	185.128 g·mol^{−1}
Appearance	amber solid < 159 °C, pink > 159 °C
Melting point	175 °C (347 °F; 448 K)
Boiling point	245 °C (473 °F; 518 K)

Hazards
- GHS labelling
Pictograms	(GHS02: Flammable) (GHS07: Exclamation mark)
Signal word	Danger
Hazard statements	H228, H315, H319, H335
Precautionary statements	P210, P261, P305+P351+P338
NFPA 704 (fire diamond)	2 2 3
Flash point	52 °C (126 °F; 325 K)
- Except where otherwise noted, data are given for materials in their standard state (at 25 °C [77 °F], 100 kPa). verify (what is ?) Infobox references

Manganocene or bis(cyclopentadienyl)manganese(II) is an organomanganese compound with the formula [Mn(C_{5}H_{5})_{2}]_{n}. It is a thermochromic solid that degrades rapidly in air. Although the compound is of little utility, it is often discussed as an example of a metallocene with ionic character.

== Synthesis and structure ==
It may be prepared in the manner common for other metallocenes, i.e., by reaction of manganese(II) chloride with sodium cyclopentadienide:

MnCl_{2} + 2 CpNa → Cp_{2}Mn + 2 NaCl

In the solid state below 159 °C, manganocene adopts a polymeric structure with every manganese atom coordinated by three cyclopentadienyl ligands, two of which are bridging ligands. Above 159 °C, the solid changes color from amber to pink and the polymer converts to the structure of a normal sandwich complex, i.e., the molecule Mn(η^{5}-C_{5}H_{5})_{2}.

== Reactions ==
The ionic character of manganocene gives it an unusual pattern of reactivities compared to metallocenes of other transition metals in the same row. It is kinetically labile, being readily hydrolysed by water or hydrochloric acid, and readily forms adducts with two- or four-electron Lewis bases.

Manganocene polymerizes ethylene to high molecular weight linear polyethylene in the presence of methylaluminoxane or diethylaluminium chloride as cocatalysts. It does not polymerize propylene.
