= Manganese(IV) fluoride =

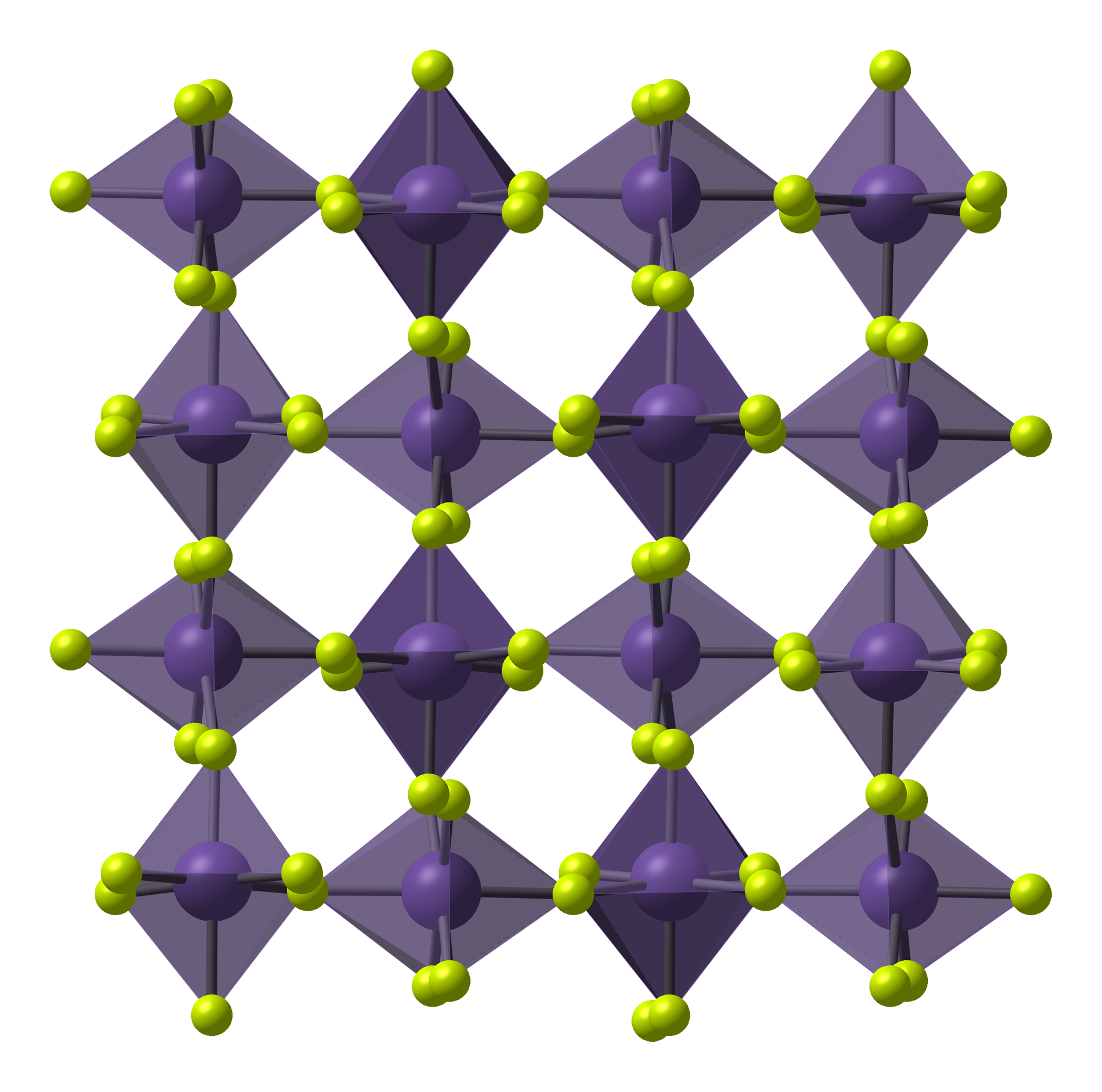

Names
- IUPAC name manganese tetrafluoride
- Other names manganese(IV) fluoride

Identifiers
CAS Number	15195-58-1
3D model (JSmol)	Interactive image
ChemSpider	14941034
ECHA InfoCard	100.356.905
PubChem CID	10129971
CompTox Dashboard (EPA)	DTXSID101045561
- InChI: InChI=1S/4FH.Mn/ h4*1H;/q;;;;+4/p-4 Key: KWKYNMDHPVYLQQ-UHFFFAOYSA-J; InChI=1/4FH.Mn/h4*1H;/q;;;;+4/p-4 Key: KWKYNMDHPVYLQQ-XBHQNQODAK
- SMILES: [F-].[F-].[F-].[F-].[Mn+4]

Properties
Chemical formula	MnF_{4}
Molar mass	130.93 g mol^{−1}
Appearance	blue solid
Density	3.61 g cm^{−3} (calc.)
Melting point	70 °C (158 °F; 343 K) decomposes
Solubility in water	reacts violently

Structure
Crystal structure	tetragonal, tI80
Space group	I4_{1}/a (No. 88) (Note: The space group has also been given as R3c (No. 161) or R3̅c (No. 167); a β-form crystallizes in the rhombohedral system.)
Lattice constant	a = 1263 pm, c = 604.9 pm

Related compounds
Other cations	Manganese(II) fluoride Manganese(III) fluoride
- Except where otherwise noted, data are given for materials in their standard state (at 25 °C [77 °F], 100 kPa). Infobox references

Manganese tetrafluoride, MnF_{4}, is the highest fluoride of manganese. It is a powerful oxidizing agent and is used as a means of purifying elemental fluorine.

== Preparation ==
Manganese tetrafluoride was first unequivocally prepared in 1961 (Note: Reports of the preparation of MnF_{4} date back to the nineteenth century, but are inconsistent with the now-known chemistry of the genuine compound.) by the reaction of manganese(II) fluoride (or other Mn^{II} compounds) with a stream of fluorine gas at 550 °C: the MnF_{4} sublimes into the gas stream and condenses onto a cold finger. This is still the commonest method of preparation, although the sublimation can be avoided by operating at increased fluorine pressure (4.5–6 bar at 180–320 °C) and mechanically agitating the powder to avoid sintering of the grains. The reaction can also be carried out starting from manganese powder in a fluidized bed.

Other preparations of MnF_{4} include the fluorination of MnF_{2} with krypton difluoride, or with F_{2} in liquid hydrogen fluoride solution under ultraviolet light. Manganese tetrafluoride has also been prepared (but not isolated) in an acid–base reaction between antimony pentafluoride and K_{2}MnF_{6} as part of a chemical synthesis of elemental fluorine.

K_{2}MnF_{6} + 2 SbF_{5} → MnF_{4} + 2 KSbF_{6}

== Chemistry ==
=== Decomposition ===
Manganese tetrafluoride is in equilibrium with manganese(III) fluoride and elemental fluorine:

MnF_{4} ⇌ MnF_{3} + 1/2 F_{2}

Decomposition is favoured by increasing temperature, and disfavoured by the presence of fluorine gas, but the exact parameters of the equilibrium are unclear, with some sources saying that MnF_{4} will decompose slowly at room temperature, others placing a practical lower temperature limit of 70 °C, and another claiming that MnF_{4} is essentially stable up to 320 °C. The equilibrium pressure of fluorine above MnF_{4} at room temperature has been estimated at 10^{−4} Pa (10^{−9} bar), and the enthalpy change of reaction at +44(8) kJ mol^{−1}. (Note: These two results are inconsistent with one another, as Δ_{r}H^{~~o~~} would have to be about +80 kJ mol^{−1} for p_{eq}(F_{2}) ≈ 10^{−9} bar at 298 K, given that the overwhelming contribution to Δ_{r}S^{~~o~~} is S^{~~o~~}(F_{2}) = 202.791(5) J K^{−1} mol^{−1}. The quoted value of Δ_{r}H^{~~o~~} is consistent with most reported decomposition temperatures.)

=== Other reactions ===
Manganese tetrafluoride reacts violently with water and even with sodium-dried petroleum ether. It immediately decomposes on contact with moist air.

Reaction with alkali metal fluorides or concentrated hydrofluoric acid gives the yellow hexafluoromanganate(IV) anion [MnF_{6}]^{2−}.

MnF_{4} reacts with XeF_{2} to form Lewis acid-base adducts: 3XeF_{2}∙2MnF_{4}, XeF_{2}∙MnF_{4}, and XeF_{2}∙2MnF_{4}. A tetrameric F-bridged ring with XeF_{2} molecules coordinated to metal atoms, observed in the crystal structure of XeF_{2}∙MnF_{4} (XeMnF_{6}) adduct, could serve as a structural model for the currently unknown structure of the first noble-gas compound, XePtF_{6}.

== Applications ==
The main application of manganese tetrafluoride is in the purification of elemental fluorine. Fluorine gas is produced by electrolysis of anhydrous hydrogen fluoride (with a small amount of potassium fluoride added as a support electrolyte) in a Moissan cell. The technical product is contaminated with HF, much of which can be removed by passing the gas over solid KF, but also with oxygen (from traces of water) and possibly heavy-metal fluorides such as arsenic pentafluoride (from contamination of the HF). These contaminants are particularly problematic for the semiconductor industry, which uses high-purity fluorine for etching silicon wafers. Further impurities, such as iron, nickel, gallium and tungsten compounds, can be introduced if unreacted fluorine is recycled.

The technical-grade fluorine is purified by reacting it with MnF_{3} to form manganese tetrafluoride. As this stage, any heavy metals present will form involatile complex fluorides, while the HF and O_{2} are unreactive. Once the MnF_{3} has been converted, the excess gas is vented for recycling, carrying the remaining gaseous impurities with it. The MnF_{4} is then heated to 380 °C to release fluorine at purities of up to 99.95%, reforming MnF_{3}, which can be reused. By placing two reactors in parallel, the purification process can be made continuous, with one reactor taking in technical fluorine while the other delivers high-grade fluorine. Alternatively, the manganese tetrafluoride can be isolated and transported to where the fluorine is needed, at lower cost and greater safety than pressurized fluorine gas.

== Fluoromanganate(IV) complexes ==
The yellow hexafluoromanganate(2−) of alkali metal and alkaline earth metal cations have been known since 1899, and can be prepared by the fluorination of MnF_{2} in the presence of the fluoride of the appropriate cation. They are much more stable than manganese tetrafluoride. Potassium hexafluoromanganate(IV), K_{2}MnF_{6}, can also be prepared by the controlled reduction of potassium permanganate in 50% aqueous hydrofluoric acid.

2 KMnO_{4} + 2 KF + 10 HF + 3 H_{2}O_{2} → 2 K_{2}MnF_{6} + 8 H_{2}O + 3 O_{2}

The pentafluoromanganate(1−) salts of potassium, rubidium and caesium, MMnF_{5}, can be prepared by fluorination of MMnF_{3} or by the reaction of [MnF_{4}(py)(H_{2}O)] with MF. The lemon-yellow heptafluoromanganate(3−) salts of the same metals, M_{3}MnF_{7}, have also been prepared.

When potassium hexafluoromanganate is doped into potassium fluorosilicate it forms a narrow band red phosphor.

== Notes and references ==
=== Further reading ===
- Gubkina, N. I.; Sokolov, Sergey V.; Krylov, E. I. (1966), "Fluorides of High Oxidising Power and Their Application to the Preparation of Organic Fluorine Compounds", Russ. Chem. Rev., 35 (12): 930–41, Bibcode:1966RuCRv..35..930G, doi:10.1070/RC1966v035n12ABEH001550, S2CID 250817326.
- Hoppe, R.; Müller, B.; Burgess, J.; Peacock, R. D.; Sherry, R. (1980), "The enthalpy of formation of manganese tetrafluoride", J. Fluorine Chem., 16 (2): 189–91, Bibcode:1980JFluC..16..189H, doi:10.1016/S0022-1139(00)82393-3.
