= Manganese-mediated coupling reactions =

Class of chemical reactions

Manganese-mediated coupling reactions are radical coupling reactions between enolizable carbonyl compounds and unsaturated compounds initiated by a manganese(III) salt, typically manganese(III) acetate. Copper(II) acetate is sometimes used as a co-oxidant to assist in the oxidation of intermediate radicals to carbocations.

Manganese(III) acetate is effective for the oxidation of enolizable carbonyl compounds to α-oxoalkyl or α,α'-dioxoalkyl radicals. Radicals generated in this manner may then undergo inter- or intramolecular addition to carbon-carbon multiple bonds. Pathways available to the adduct radical include further oxidation to a carbocation (and subsequent β-elimination or trapping with a nucleophile) and hydrogen abstraction to generate a saturated carbonyl compound containing a new carbon-carbon bond. Copper(II) acetate is sometimes needed to facilitate the oxidation of adduct radicals to carbocations. Yields of these reactions are generally moderate, particularly in the intermolecular case, but tandem intramolecular radical cyclizations initiated by Mn(III) oxidation may generate complex carbocyclic frameworks. Because of the limited functional group compatibility of Mn(OAc)_{3}, radical couplings employing this reagent have mainly been applied to the synthesis of hydrocarbon natural products, such as pheromones.

(1)

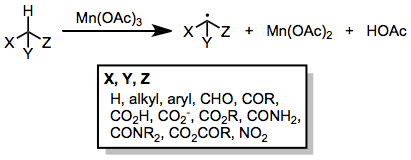

== Mechanism ==
Manganese(III)-mediated radical reactions begin with the single-electron oxidation of a carbonyl compound to an α-oxoalkyl radical. Addition to an olefin then occurs, generating adduct radical 2. The fate of 2 is primarily determined by reaction conditions—in the presence of copper(II) acetate, this intermediate undergoes further oxidation to a carbocation and may eliminate to form β,γ-unsaturated ketone 4. Manganese acetate itself can effect the second oxidation of resonance-stabilized adduct radicals to carbocations 5; unstabilized radicals undergo further transformations before reacting with Mn(OAc)_{3}. Atom transfer from another molecule of substrate may generate saturated compound 3. Adduct radicals or carbocations may undergo ligand-transfer reactions, yielding γ-functionalized carbonyl compounds. When lithium chloride is used as an additive, chlorination takes place. Alternatively, carbocations may be trapped intramolecularly by the carbonyl oxygen to form dihydrofurans after β-elimination.

(2)

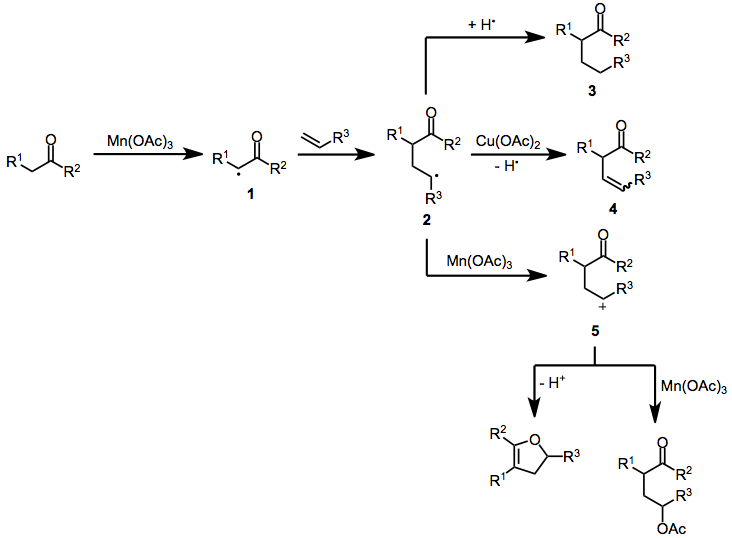

== Scope ==
The outcomes of manganese-mediated coupling reactions depend on both the structure of the substrate(s) and the reaction conditions. This section describes the scope and limitations of inter- and intramolecular manganese-mediated radical coupling reactions and is organized according to the carbonyl compound employed as the substrate.

Intermolecular reactions between ketones/aldehydes and alkenes tend to result in low yields. In the absence of copper(II) acetate, hydrogen atom abstraction occurs, yielding saturated ketones or aldehydes.

(3)

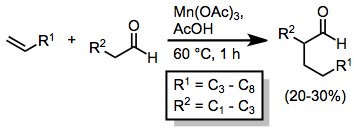

When Cu(OAc)_{2} is present, further oxidation to carbocations followed by elimination takes place, leading to the formation of β,γ-unsaturated carbonyl compounds in moderate yields.

(4)

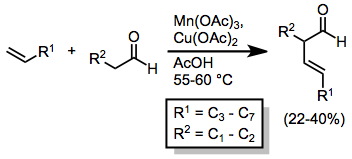

Aromatic compounds are also useful radical acceptors in manganese(III)-mediated coupling reactions. Furan reacts selectively at the α position to afford substituted products in high yield.

(5)

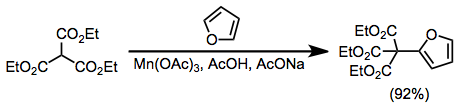

Lactonization of alkenes in the presence of acetic acid and acetate salts is a synthetically useful method for the synthesis of γ-lactones. Selectivity is high for the radical addition that leads to the more stable adduct radical, and trans lactones are selectively formed from either cis or trans acyclic alkenes.

(6)

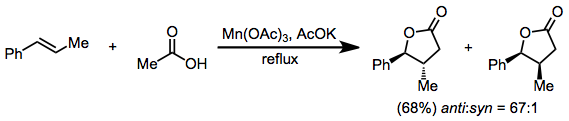

β-Dicarbonyl compounds are useful substrates for the formation of dihydrofurans. Copper(II) acetate is not necessary in this case because of the high resonance stabilization of the intermediate diphenylmethyl radical.

(7)

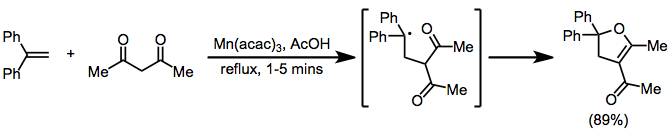

When alkenes or carbonyl compounds containing pendant unsaturated moiety are treated with manganese(III) acetate, tandem intramolecular cyclization reactions may occur. Generally, exo cyclization of terminal double bonds is favored, as shown in equation (10). A variety of substitution patterns may be employed for this transformation, and yields are generally higher than intermolecular coupling reactions.

(8)

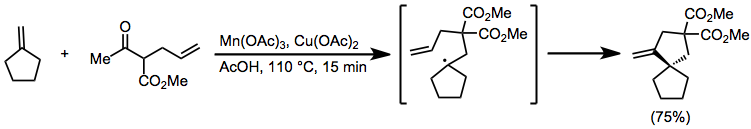

The stereochemical course of tandem reactions can be understood in some cases by invoking a chairlike transition state with as many substituents as possible in pseudoequatorial positions; however, a number of examples exhibiting unpredictable stereochemistry are known.

(9)

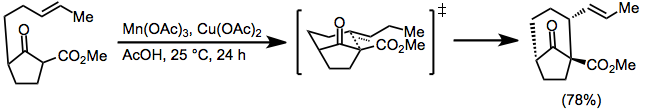

Nitriles are useful as radical acceptors in tandem cyclizations. Hydrolysis of the resulting imine leads to polycyclic ketones in moderate yields with good stereoselectivity.

(10)

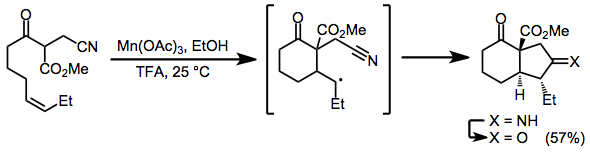

== Use in organic chemistry ==
Manganese-mediated couplings have been used for the synthesis of hydrocarbon natural products, such as pheromones. A synthesis of queen bee pheromone uses the intermolecular coupling of acetone and an ω-alkenyl acetate en route to the target.

(11)

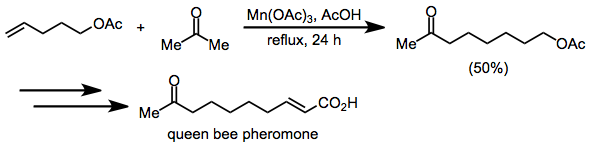

Lactonization is a key step in the synthesis of tomato pinworm sex pheromone. Subsequent Lindlar hydrogenation, reduction and acetylation provided the target compound.

(12)

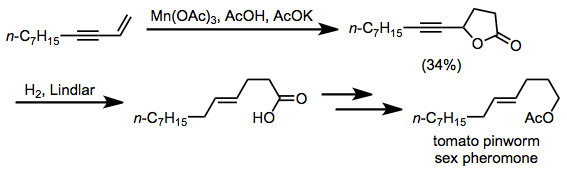
