= Ammonium hexafluorochromate =

Names
- Other names Ammonium hexafluorochromate(III)

Identifiers
3D model (JSmol)	Interactive image
- InChI: InChI=1S/Cr.6FH.3H3N/h;6*1H;3*1H3/q+3;;;;;;;;;/p-3 Key: CJAHGVJHJXBBOA-UHFFFAOYSA-K
- SMILES: [NH4+].[NH4+].[NH4+].F[Cr-3](F)(F)(F)(F)F

Properties
Chemical formula	CrF_{6}H_{12}N_{3}
Molar mass	220.104 g·mol^{−1}
Appearance	green crystals
Density	g/cm^{3}
- Except where otherwise noted, data are given for materials in their standard state (at 25 °C [77 °F], 100 kPa). Infobox references

Ammonium hexafluorochromate is an inorganic chemical compound with the chemical formula (NH_{4})_{3}CrF_{6}.

== Physical properties ==
Ammonium hexafluorochromate forms crystals of cubic system, space group F43m.

== Chemical properties ==
When heated, ammonium hexafluorochromate decomposed directly to the pure chromium(III) fluoride.

[NH_{4}]_{3}[CrF_{6}] → CrF_{3} + 3 NH_{3} + 3 HF
