= Manganese(III) oxide =

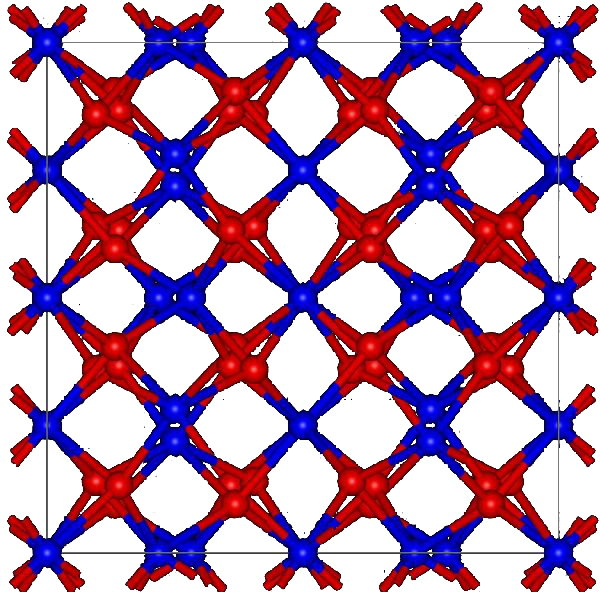

Names
- Other names dimanganese trioxide, manganese sesquioxide, manganic oxide, manganous oxide

Identifiers
| CAS Number | 1317-34-6 |
| 3D model (JSmol) | Interactive image |
| ChemSpider | 14139 |
| ECHA InfoCard | 100.013.878 |
| PubChem CID | 14824 |
| RTECS number | OP915000 |
| UNII | XQ8YIG4A7C |
| CompTox Dashboard (EPA) | DTXSID90893847 |
- InChI: InChI=1S/2Mn.3O Key: GEYXPJBPASPPLI-UHFFFAOYSA-N; InChI=1/2Mn.3O/rMn2O3/c3-1-5-2-4 Key: GEYXPJBPASPPLI-YNHMASKPAU
- SMILES: O=[Mn]O[Mn]=O

Properties
| Chemical formula | Mn_{2}O_{3} |
| Molar mass | 157.8743 g/mol |
| Appearance | brown or black crystalline |
| Density | 4.50 g/cm^{3} |
| Melting point | 888 °C (1,630 °F; 1,161 K) (alpha form); 940 °C, decomposes (beta form) |
| Solubility in water | 0.00504 g/100 mL (alpha form); 0.01065 g/100 mL (beta form) |
| Solubility | insoluble in ethanol, acetone soluble in acid, ammonium chloride |
| Magnetic susceptibility (χ) | +14,100·10^{−6} cm^{3}/mol |

Structure
| Crystal structure | Bixbyite, cI80 |
| Space group | Ia3̅ (No. 206) |
| Lattice constant | a = 942 pm |

Thermochemistry
| Std molar entropy (S^{⦵}_{298}) | 110 J·mol^{−1}·K^{−1} |
| Std enthalpy of formation (Δ_{f}H^{⦵}_{298}) | −971 kJ·mol^{−1} |

Hazards
| NFPA 704 (fire diamond) | 1 0 0 |

Related compounds
| Other anions | manganese trifluoride, manganese(III) acetate |
| Other cations | chromium(III) oxide, iron(III) oxide |
| Related compounds | manganese(II) oxide, manganese dioxide |
- Except where otherwise noted, data are given for materials in their standard state (at 25 °C [77 °F], 100 kPa). verify (what is ?) Infobox references

Manganese(III) oxide is a chemical compound with the formula Mn_{2}O_{3}. It occurs in nature as the mineral bixbyite (recently changed to bixbyite-(Mn)) and is used in the production of ferrites and thermistors.

== Preparation and chemistry ==
Heating MnO_{2} in air at below 800 °C produces α-Mn_{2}O_{3} (higher temperatures produce Mn_{3}O_{4}). γ-Mn_{2}O_{3} can be produced by oxidation followed by dehydration of manganese(II) hydroxide. Many preparations of nano-crystalline Mn_{2}O_{3} have been reported, for example syntheses involving oxidation of Mn^{II} salts or reduction of MnO_{2}.

Manganese(III) oxide is formed by the redox reaction in an alkaline cell:

2 MnO_{2} + Zn → Mn_{2}O_{3} + ZnO

Manganese(III) oxide Mn_{2}O_{3} must not be confused with MnOOH manganese(III) oxyhydroxide. Contrary to Mn_{2}O_{3}, MnOOH is a compound that decomposes at about 300 °C to form MnO_{2}.

== Structure ==
Mn_{2}O_{3} is unlike many other transition metal oxides in that it does not adopt the corundum (Al_{2}O_{3}) structure. Two forms are generally recognized, α-Mn_{2}O_{3} and γ-Mn_{2}O_{3}, although a high pressure form with the CaIrO_{3} structure has been reported too.

α-Mn_{2}O_{3} has the cubic bixbyite structure, which is an example of a C-type rare earth sesquioxide (Pearson symbol cI80, space group Ia3̅, #206). The bixbyite structure has been found to be stabilised by the presence of small amounts of Fe^{3+}, pure Mn_{2}O_{3} has an orthorhombic structure (Pearson symbol oP24, space group Pbca, #61). α-Mn_{2}O_{3} undergoes antiferromagnetic transition at 80 K.

γ-Mn_{2}O_{3} has a structure related to the spinel structure of Mn_{3}O_{4} where the oxide ions are cubic close packed. This is similar to the relationship between γ-Fe_{2}O_{3} and Fe_{3}O_{4}. γ-Mn_{2}O_{3} is ferrimagnetic with a Curie temperature of 39 K.

ε-Mn_{2}O_{3} takes on a rhombohedral ilmenite structure (the first binary compound known to do so), wherein the manganese cations divided equally into oxidation states 2+ and 4+. ε-Mn_{2}O_{3} is antiferromagnetic with a Néel temperature of 210 K.
