= Manganese pentacarbonyl bromide =

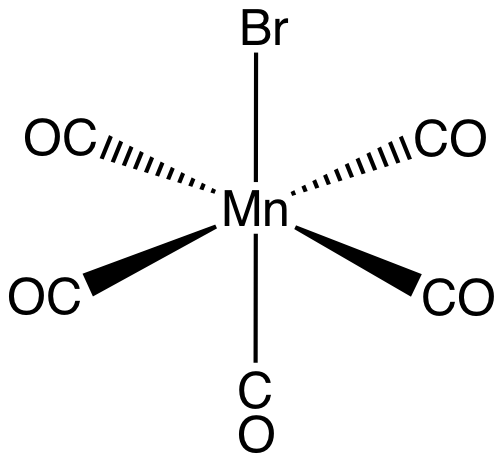

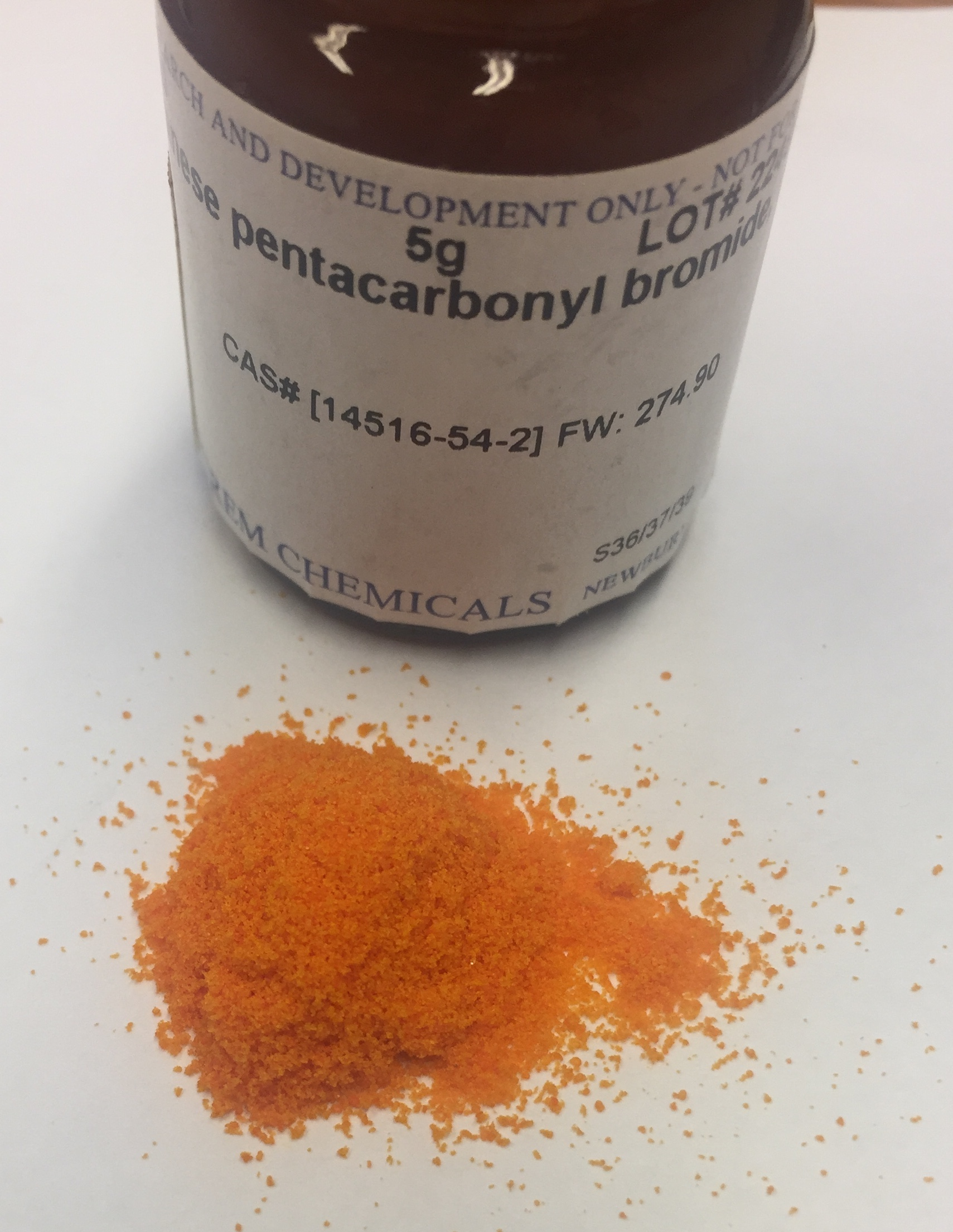

Names
- Other names bromopentacarbonylmanganese

Identifiers
CAS Number	14516-54-2
3D model (JSmol)	Interactive image
ChemSpider	13488738
ECHA InfoCard	100.035.005
EC Number	238-522-8
PubChem CID	10978692
- InChI: InChI=1S/5CO.BrH.Mn/c5*1-2;;/h;;;;;1H;/q;;;;;;+1/p-1 Key: OESORJHGSXJTKX-UHFFFAOYSA-M
- SMILES: [C-]#[O+].[C-]#[O+].[C-]#[O+].[C-]#[O+].[C-]#[O+].[Mn].[Br-]

Properties
Chemical formula	C_{5}BrMnO_{5}
Molar mass	274.892 g·mol^{−1}
Appearance	orange solid

Hazards
- GHS labelling
Pictograms	(GHS07: Exclamation mark)
Signal word	Warning
Hazard statements	H302, H312, H332
Precautionary statements	P261, P264, P270, P271, P280, P301+P312, P302+P352, P304+P312, P304+P340, P312, P322, P330, P363, P501
- Except where otherwise noted, data are given for materials in their standard state (at 25 °C [77 °F], 100 kPa). Infobox references

Manganese pentacarbonyl bromide is an organomanganese compound with the formula BrMn(CO)_{5}. It is a bright orange solid that is a precursor to other manganese complexes. The compound is prepared by treatment of dimanganese decacarbonyl with bromine:

Mn_{2}(CO)_{10} + Br_{2} → 2 BrMn(CO)_{5}

The complex undergoes substitution by a variety of donor ligands (L), e.g. to give derivatives of the type BrMn(CO)_{3}L_{2}.

The complex adopts an octahedral coordination geometry.

Manganese pentacarbonyl bromide is a precursor to the arene complexes [(η^{6}-arene)Mn(CO)_{3}]^{+}.
