= Manganese(II) iodide =

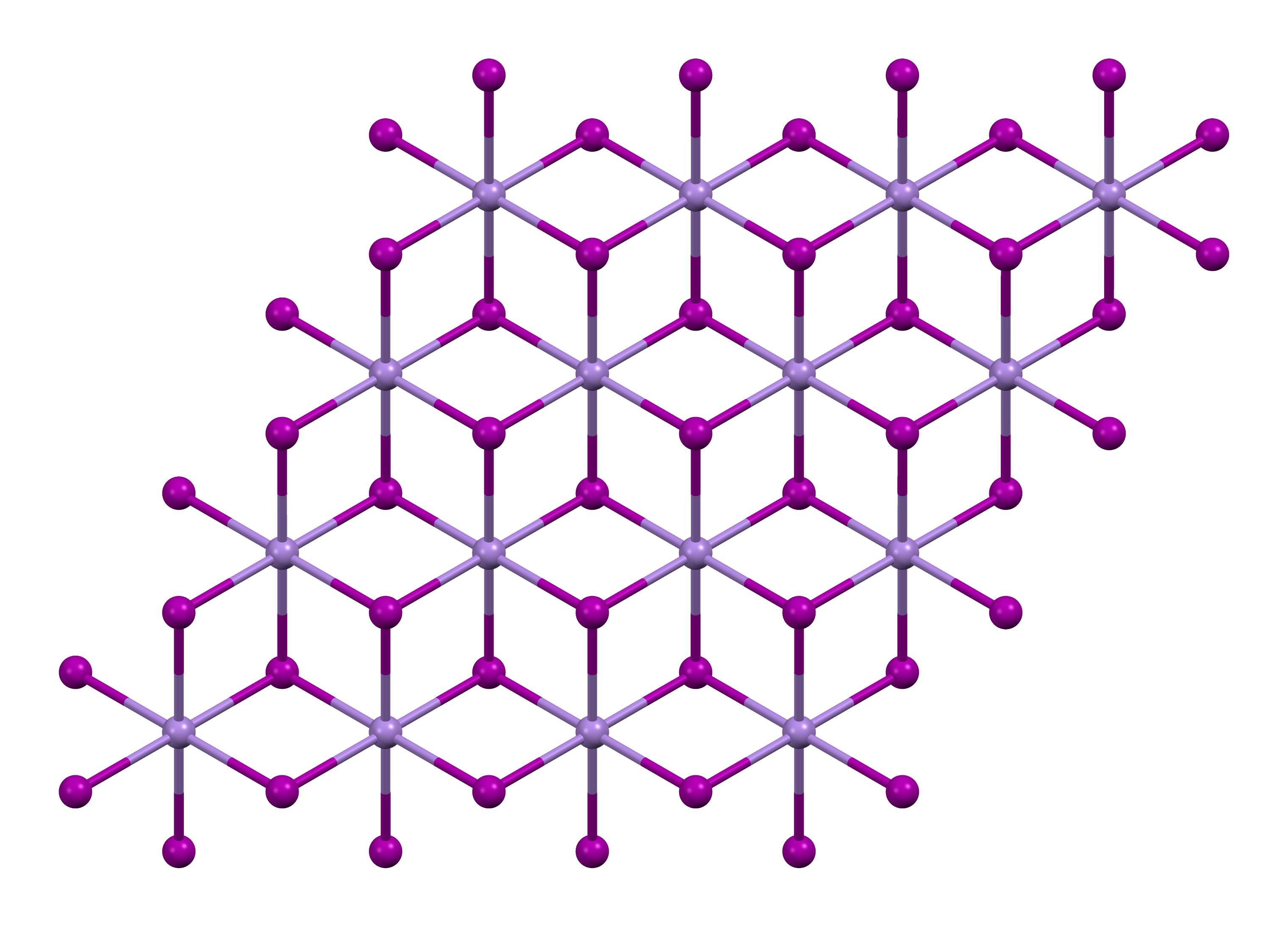
- Ball-and-stick model of part of a layer in the crystal structure of manganese(II) iodide

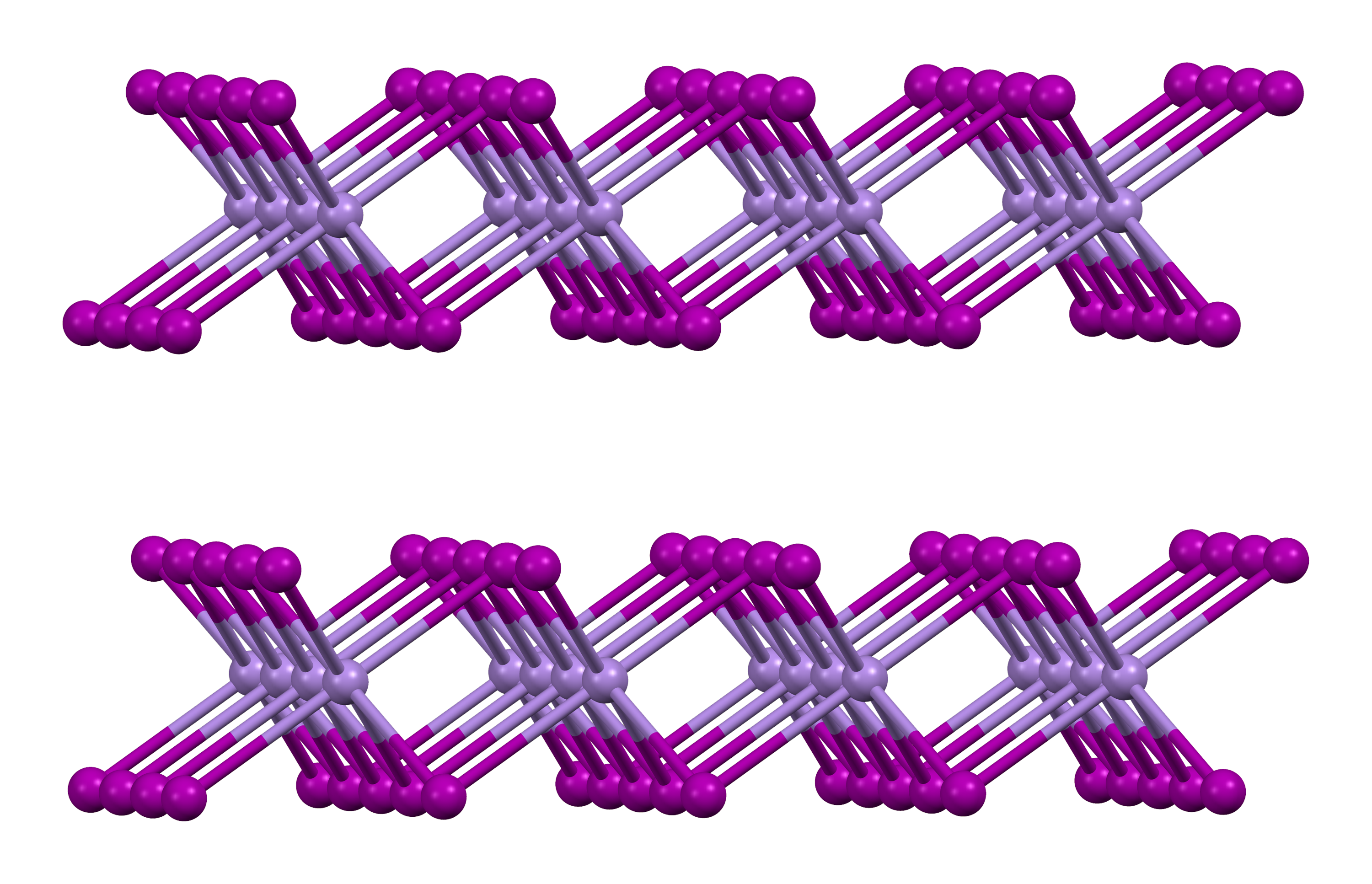
- Ball-and-stick model of layer stacking in the crystal structure of manganese(II) iodide

- Molecular structure of manganese(II) iodide tetrahydrate

Names
- IUPAC name Manganese(II) iodide

Identifiers
CAS Number	7790-33-2; 7790-33-2 tetrahydrate
3D model (JSmol)	Interactive image
ChemSpider	74227
ECHA InfoCard	100.029.274
EC Number	232-201-6
PubChem CID	82250
UNII	5Q9VVO3QCN
CompTox Dashboard (EPA)	DTXSID20999088
- InChI: InChI=1S/2HI.Mn/h2*1H;/q;;+2/p-2 Key: QWYFOIJABGVEFP-UHFFFAOYSA-L; InChI=1/2HI.Mn/h2*1H;/q;;+2/p-2 Key: QWYFOIJABGVEFP-NUQVWONBAL
- SMILES: I[Mn]I-

Properties
Chemical formula	MnI_{2}
Molar mass	308.747 g/mol
Appearance	pink crystalline
Density	5.01 g/cm^{3}
Melting point	701 °C (1,294 °F; 974 K) (anhydrous); 80 °C (tetrahydrate)
Boiling point	1,033 °C (1,891 °F; 1,306 K)
Solubility in water	soluble
Magnetic susceptibility (χ)	+14,400·10^{−6} cm^{3}/mol

Structure
Crystal structure	Rhombohedral, hP3, SpaceGroup = P-3m1, No. 164
Coordination geometry	octahedral

Hazards
- GHS labelling
Pictograms	(GHS08: Health hazard)
Signal word	Danger
Hazard statements	H360
Precautionary statements	P201, P202, P281, P308+P313, P405, P501
NFPA 704 (fire diamond)	1 0 1
Flash point	non-flammable

Related compounds
Other anions	Manganese(II) fluoride Manganese(II) chloride Manganese(II) bromide
Other cations	Iron(II) iodide Cobalt(II) iodide
- Except where otherwise noted, data are given for materials in their standard state (at 25 °C [77 °F], 100 kPa). verify (what is ?) Infobox references

Manganese(II) iodide is the chemical compound composed of manganese and iodide with the formula MnI_{2}(H_{2}O)_{n}. The tetrahydrate is a pink solid while the anhydrous derivative is beige. Both forms feature octahedral Mn centers. Unlike MnCl_{2}(H_{2}O)_{4} and MnBr_{2}(H_{2}O)_{4} which are cis, MnI_{2}(H_{2}O)_{4} is trans.

== Preparation ==
Anhydrous MnI_{2} is prepared from the elements:

Mn + I_{2} → MnI_{2}

The tetrahydrate can be prepared by treating manganese(II) carbonate with hydriodic acid. The anhydrous form can be produced from it by dehydration in a vacuum.

== Properties ==
Samples turn brown in air under the influence of light as a result of the oxidation of the iodide ion to iodine. It has a trigonal crystal structure of the cadmium iodide type (polytype 2H) with the space group P3̅m1 (space group no. 164). It dissolves in water and decomposes. The tetrahydrate has a monoclinic crystal structure with the space group P2_{1}/c (No. 14).

== Applications ==
It is often used in the lighting industry.
