= Chromium(III) fluoride =

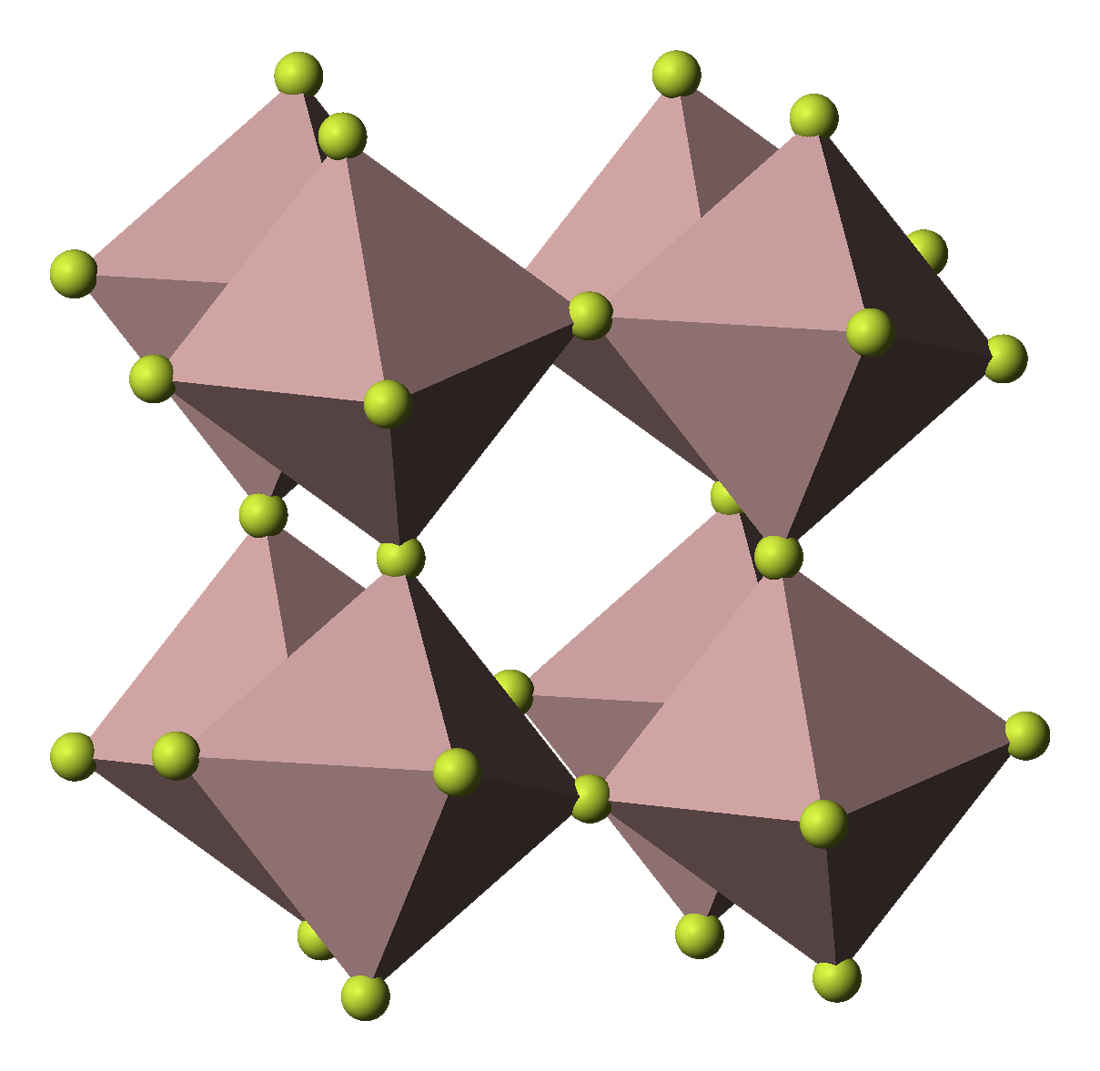

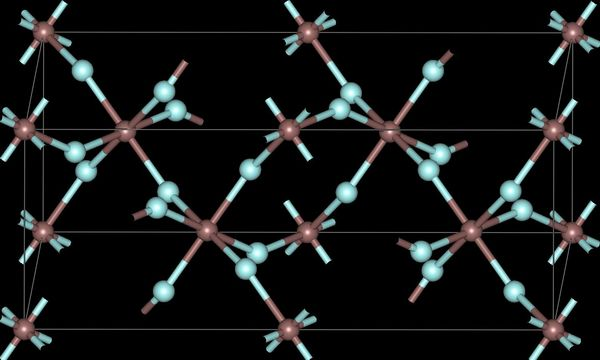

Names
- IUPAC name Chromium(III) fluoride
- Other names Chromium trifluoride

Identifiers
CAS Number	7788-97-8; 16671-27-5 (trihydrate); 123333-98-2 (tetrahydrate)
3D model (JSmol)	Interactive image
ChemSpider	8329529
ECHA InfoCard	100.029.216
PubChem CID	522687
RTECS number	GB6125000
UNII	YK57ASE6UA
CompTox Dashboard (EPA)	DTXSID10880971
- InChI: InChI=1S/Cr.3FH/h;3*1H/q+3;;;/p-3 Key: FTBATIJJKIIOTP-UHFFFAOYSA-K; InChI=1/Cr.3FH/h;3*1H/q+3;;;/p-3 Key: FTBATIJJKIIOTP-DFZHHIFOAR
- SMILES: [Cr+3].[F-].[F-].[F-]

Properties
Chemical formula	CrF_{3}
Molar mass	108.9913 g/mol (anhydrous); 163.037 g/mol (trihydrate); 181.05 g/mol (tetrahydrate)
Appearance	green crystalline solid
Density	3.8 g/cm^{3} (anhydrous); 2.2 g/cm^{3} (trihydrate)
Melting point	1,100 °C (2,010 °F; 1,370 K) (sublimes)
Solubility in water	negligible (anhydrous) sparingly soluble (trihydrate)
Solubility	Insoluble in alcohols Soluble in HF, HCl
Magnetic susceptibility (χ)	+4370.0·10^{−6} cm^{3}/mol

Structure
Crystal structure	Rhombohedral, hR24
Space group	R-3c, No. 167

Hazards
- GHS labelling
Pictograms	(GHS05: Corrosive) (GHS06: Toxic) (GHS07: Exclamation mark) (GHS08: Health hazard) (GHS09: Environmental hazard)
Signal word	Danger
Hazard statements	H301, H302, H312, H314, H317, H332, H372, H400, H411
Precautionary statements	P260, P264, P264+P265, P270, P271, P272, P273, P280, P301+P316, P301+P317, P301+P330+P331, P302+P352, P302+P361+P354, P304+P340, P305+P354+P338, P316, P317, P319, P321, P330, P333+P317, P362+P364, P363, P391, P405, P501
- Lethal dose or concentration (LD, LC)
LD_{50} (median dose)	150 mg/kg (guinea pig, oral)
- NIOSH (US health exposure limits)
PEL (Permissible)	TWA 1 mg/m^{3}
REL (Recommended)	TWA 0.5 mg/m^{3}
IDLH (Immediate danger)	250 mg/m^{3}
- Except where otherwise noted, data are given for materials in their standard state (at 25 °C [77 °F], 100 kPa). verify (what is ?) Infobox references

Chromium(III) fluoride is an inorganic compound with the chemical formula CrF_{3}. It forms several hydrates. The compound CrF_{3} is a green crystalline solid that is insoluble in common solvents, but the hydrates [Cr(H_{2}O)_{6}]F_{3} (violet) and [Cr(H_{2}O)_{6}]F_{3}·3H_{2}O (green) are soluble in water. The anhydrous form sublimes at 1100–1200 °C.

== Structures ==
Like almost all compounds of chromium(III), these compounds feature octahedral Cr centres. In the anhydrous form, the six coordination sites are occupied by fluoride ligands that bridge to adjacent Cr centres. In the hydrates, some or all of the fluoride ligands are replaced by water.

== Production ==
Chromium(III) fluoride is produced from the reaction of chromium(III) oxide and hydrofluoric acid:

Cr_{2}O_{3} + 6 HF + 9 H_{2}O → 2 [Cr(H_{2}O)_{6}]F_{3}

The anhydrous form is produced from hydrogen fluoride and chromic chloride:

CrCl_{3} + 3 HF → CrF_{3} + 3 HCl

Another method of synthesis of CrF_{3} involves thermal decomposition of [NH_{4}]_{3}[CrF_{6}] (ammonium hexafluorochromate(III)):

[NH_{4}]_{3}[CrF_{6}] → CrF_{3} + 3 NH_{3} + 3 HF

A mixed valence compound Cr_{2}F_{5} (chromium(II,III) fluoride) is also known.

== Uses ==
Chromium(III) fluoride finds some applications as a mordant in textiles and as a corrosion inhibitor. Chromium(III) fluoride catalyzes the fluorination of chlorocarbons by HF.
