= Manganese(II) fluoride =

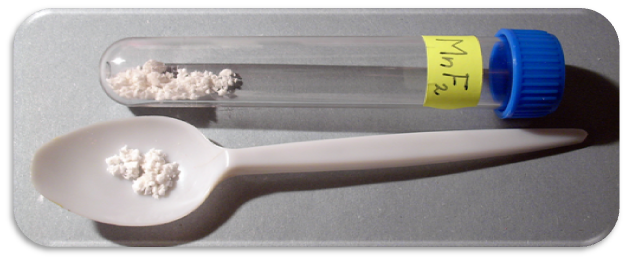

Names
- IUPAC name Manganese(II) fluoride

Identifiers
CAS Number	7782-64-1
3D model (JSmol)	Interactive image
ChemSpider	22935
ECHA InfoCard	100.029.054
EC Number	231-960-0
PubChem CID	24528
RTECS number	OP0875000
UNII	1XRA8Q11QP
CompTox Dashboard (EPA)	DTXSID7064811
- InChI: InChI=1S/2FH.Mn/h2*1H;/q;;+2/p-2 Key: CTNMMTCXUUFYAP-UHFFFAOYSA-L; InChI=1/2FH.Mn/h2*1H;/q;;+2/p-2 Key: CTNMMTCXUUFYAP-NUQVWONBAJ
- SMILES: F[Mn]F

Properties
Chemical formula	MnF_{2}
Molar mass	92.934855 g/mol
Appearance	pale pink crystalline
Density	3.98 g/cm^{3}
Melting point	856 °C (1,573 °F; 1,129 K)
Boiling point	1,820 °C (3,310 °F; 2,090 K)
Solubility in water	1.02 g/100 ml
Magnetic susceptibility (χ)	+10,700·10^{−6} cm^{3}/mol

Hazards
- GHS labelling
Pictograms	(GHS07: Exclamation mark)
Signal word	Warning
Hazard statements	H302, H312, H315, H319, H332, H335
Precautionary statements	P261, P264, P270, P271, P280, P301+P312, P302+P352, P304+P312, P304+P340, P305+P351+P338, P312, P321, P322, P330, P332+P313, P337+P313, P362, P363, P403+P233, P405, P501
Flash point	non-flammable

Related compounds
Other anions	Manganese(II) chloride Manganese(II) bromide Manganese(II) iodide
Other cations	Technetium(VI) fluoride Rhenium(VII) fluoride Manganese(III) fluoride Manganese(IV) fluoride
- Except where otherwise noted, data are given for materials in their standard state (at 25 °C [77 °F], 100 kPa). verify (what is ?) Infobox references

Manganese(II) fluoride is the chemical compound composed of manganese and fluoride with the formula MnF_{2}. It is a light pink solid, the light pink color being characteristic for manganese(II) compounds. It is made by treating manganese and diverse compounds of manganese(II) in hydrofluoric acid. Like some other metal difluorides, MnF_{2} crystallizes in the rutile structure, which features octahedral Mn centers.

== Uses ==
MnF_{2} is used in the manufacture of special kinds of glass and lasers. It is a canonical example of uniaxial antiferromagnet (with Neel temperature of 68 K) which has been experimentally studied since early on.
