= Manganese(II) chloride =

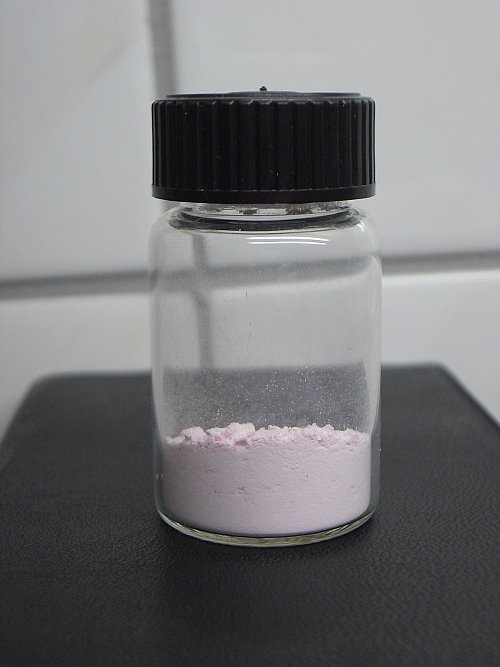
- Anhydrous

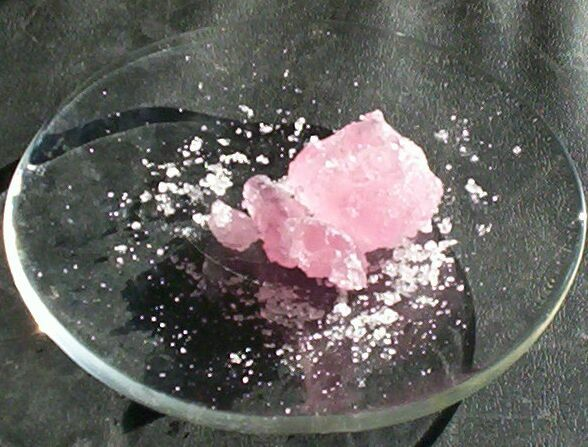
- Tetrahydrate

Names
- IUPAC names Manganese(II) chloride Manganese dichloride
- Other names Manganous chloride hyperchloride of manganese

Identifiers
CAS Number	7773-01-5; 20603-88-7 (dihydrate); 13446-34-9 (tetrahydrate)
3D model (JSmol)	anhydrous: Interactive image; tetrahydrate: Interactive image
ChEMBL	ChEMBL1200693
ChemSpider	22888
ECHA InfoCard	100.028.972
PubChem CID	24480
RTECS number	OO9625000
UNII	6YB4901Y90; QQE170PANO (tetrahydrate)
CompTox Dashboard (EPA)	DTXSID9040681
- InChI: InChI=1S/2ClH.Mn/h2*1H;/q;;+2/p-2 Key: GLFNIEUTAYBVOC-UHFFFAOYSA-L; InChI=1S/2ClH.Mn/h2*1H;/q;;+2/p-2 Key: GLFNIEUTAYBVOC-NUQVWONBAP; Key: GLFNIEUTAYBVOC-UHFFFAOYSA-L
- SMILES: anhydrous: Cl[Mn]Cl-; tetrahydrate: Cl[Mn-4]([OH2+])(Cl)([OH2+])([OH2+])[OH2+]

Properties
Chemical formula	MnCl_{2}
Molar mass	125.844 g/mol (anhydrous); 161.874 g/mol (dihydrate); 197.91 g/mol (tetrahydrate)
Appearance	pink solid (tetrahydrate)
Density	2.977 g/cm^{3} (anhydrous); 2.27 g/cm^{3} (dihydrate); 2.01 g/cm^{3} (tetrahydrate)
Melting point	654 °C (1,209 °F; 927 K) (anhydrous) dihydrate dehydrates at 135 °C tetrahydrate dehydrates at 58 °C
Boiling point	1,225 °C (2,237 °F; 1,498 K)
Solubility in water	63.4 g/100 ml (0 °C); 73.9 g/100 ml (20 °C); 88.5 g/100 ml (40 °C); 123.8 g/100 ml (100 °C)
Solubility	slightly soluble in pyridine, soluble in ethanol insoluble in ether
Magnetic susceptibility (χ)	+14,350·10^{−6} cm^{3}/mol

Structure
Crystal structure	CdCl_{2}
Coordination geometry	octahedral

Hazards
NFPA 704 (fire diamond)	2 0 0
Flash point	Non-flammable
- Lethal dose or concentration (LD, LC)
LD_{50} (median dose)	250-275 mg/kg (rat, oral); 1715 mg/kg (mouse, oral)

Related compounds
Other anions	Manganese(II) fluoride Manganese(II) bromide Manganese(II) iodide
Other cations	Manganese(III) chloride Technetium(IV) chloride Rhenium(III) chloride Rhenium(IV) chloride Rhenium(V) chloride Rhenium(VI) chloride
Related compounds	Chromium(II) chloride Iron(II) chloride
- Except where otherwise noted, data are given for materials in their standard state (at 25 °C [77 °F], 100 kPa). verify (what is ?) Infobox references

Manganese(II) chloride is the dichloride salt of manganese, MnCl_{2}. This inorganic chemical exists in the anhydrous form, as well as the dihydrate (MnCl_{2}·2H_{2}O) and tetrahydrate (MnCl_{2}·4H_{2}O), with the tetrahydrate being the most common form. Like many Mn(II) species, these salts are pink, with the paleness of the color being characteristic of transition metal complexes with high spin d^{5} configurations.

== Preparation ==
Manganese chloride is produced by treating manganese(IV) oxide with concentrated hydrochloric acid.

MnO_{2} + 4 HCl → MnCl_{2} + 2 H_{2}O + Cl_{2}

In the 19th century this reaction was used for the manufacture of chlorine. By carefully neutralizing the resulting solution with MnCO_{3}, one can selectively precipitate iron salts, which are common impurities in manganese dioxide. In the laboratory, manganese chloride can be prepared by treating manganese metal or manganese(II) carbonate with hydrochloric acid:

Mn + 2 HCl + 4 H_{2}O → MnCl_{2}(H_{2}O)_{4} + H_{2}
MnCO_{3} + 2 HCl + 3 H_{2}O → MnCl_{2}(H_{2}O)_{4} + CO_{2}

=== Structures ===
Anhydrous MnCl_{2} adopts a layered cadmium chloride-like structure. The tetrahydrate consists of octahedral cis-Mn(H_{2}O)_{4}Cl_{2} molecules. The trans isomer, which is metastable, is also known. The dihydrate MnCl_{2}(H_{2}O)_{2} is a coordination polymer. Each Mn center is coordinated to four doubly bridging chloride ligands. The octahedron is completed by a pair of mutually trans aquo ligands.

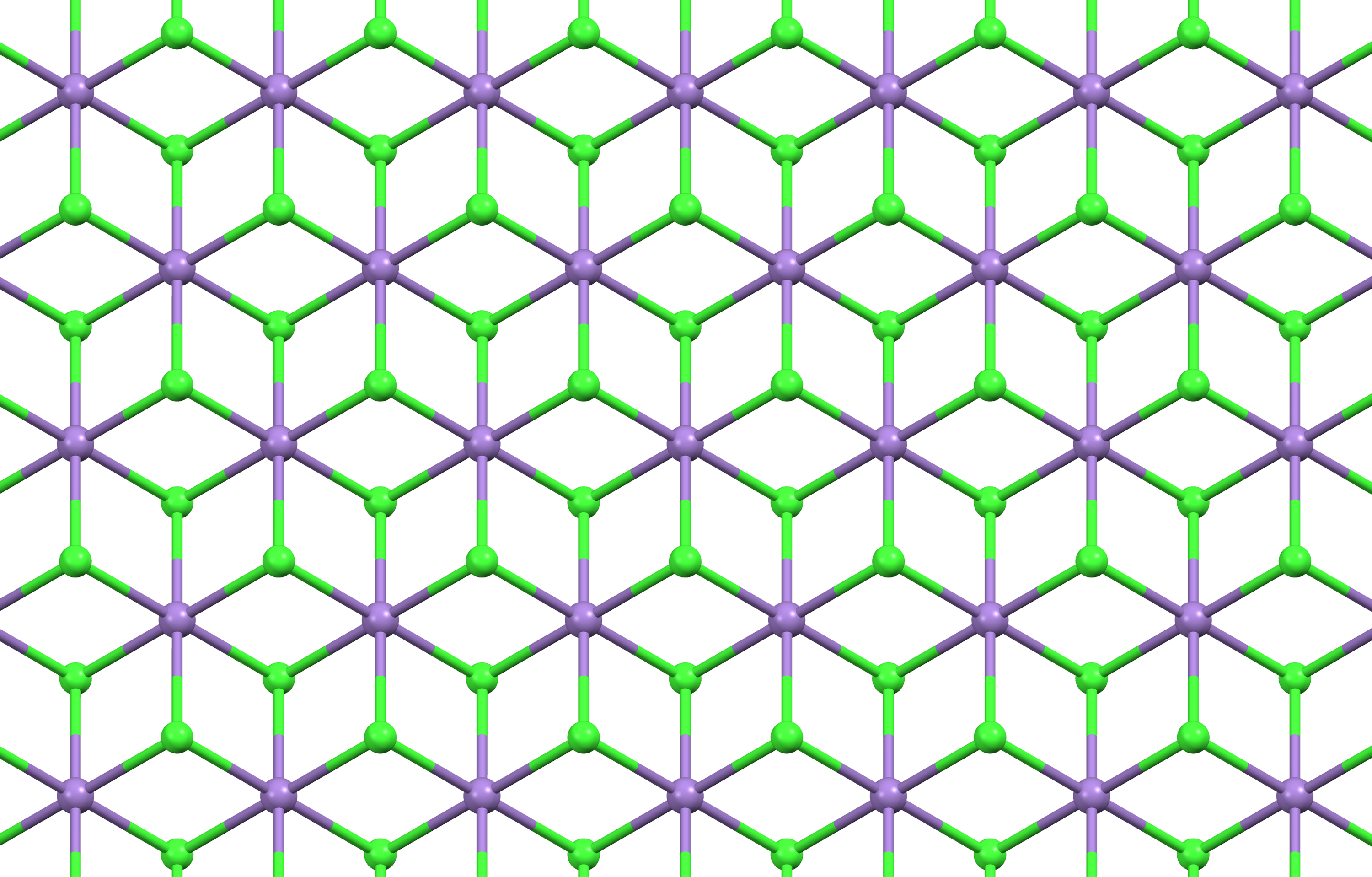
Anhydrous

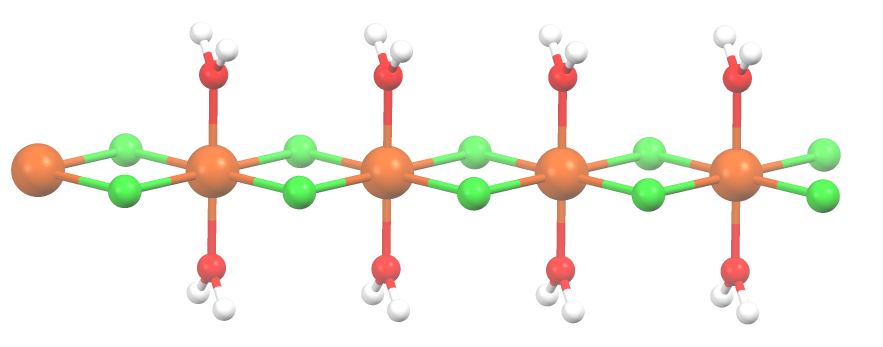
Dihydrate

Structures of the forms of manganese(II) chloride

== Chemical properties ==
The hydrates dissolve in water to give mildly acidic solutions with a pH of around 4. These solutions consist of the metal aquo complex [Mn(H_{2}O)_{6}]^{2+}.

It is a weak Lewis acid, reacting with chloride ions to produce a series of salts containing the following ions [MnCl_{3}]^{−}, [MnCl_{4}]^{2−}, and [MnCl_{6}]^{4−}.

Upon treatment with typical organic ligands, manganese(II) undergoes oxidation by air to give Mn(III) complexes. Examples include [Mn(EDTA)]^{−}, [Mn(CN)_{6}]^{3−}, and [Mn(acetylacetonate)_{3}]. Triphenylphosphine forms a labile 2:1 adduct:

MnCl_{2} + 2 Ph_{3}P → [MnCl_{2}(Ph_{3}P)_{2}]

Anhydrous manganese(II) chloride serves as a starting point for the synthesis of a variety of organomanganese compounds. For example, manganocene is prepared by reaction of MnCl_{2} with a solution of sodium cyclopentadienide in tetrahydrofuran (THF).

MnCl_{2} + 2 NaC_{5}H_{5} → Mn(C_{5}H_{5})_{2} + 2 NaCl

Similar reactions are used in the preparation of the antiknock compound methylcyclopentadienyl manganese tricarbonyl.

Manganese chloride is a precursor to organomanganese reagents in organic chemistry.

Manganese chloride is mainly used in the production of dry cell batteries.

=== Magnetism ===
Manganese(II) salts are paramagnetic. As such the presence of such salts profoundly affect NMR spectra.

== Natural occurrence ==
Scacchite is the natural, anhydrous form of manganese(II) chloride.

== Precautions ==
Manganism, or manganese poisoning, can be caused by long-term exposure to manganese dust or fumes.
