= Manganese(II) bromide =

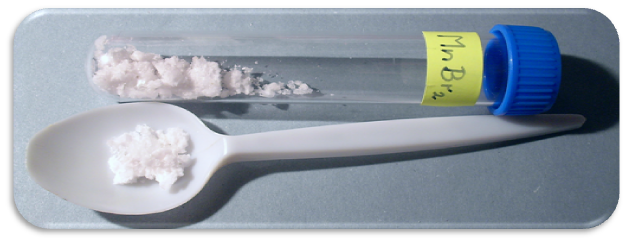
- Manganese(II) bromide

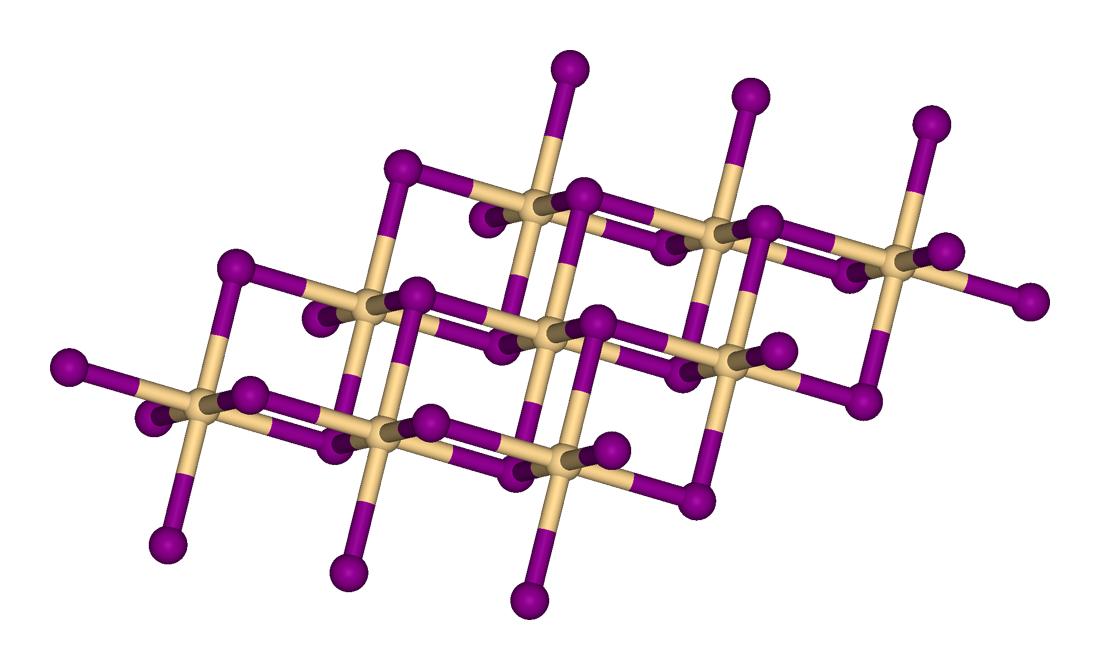

Names
- IUPAC name Manganese(II) bromide

Identifiers
CAS Number	(anhydrous): 13446-03-2 (anhydrous); (tetrahydrate): 10031-20-6
3D model (JSmol)	(anhydrous): Interactive image; (tetrahydrate): Interactive image
ChemSpider	(anhydrous): 75309; (tetrahydrate): 14499397
ECHA InfoCard	100.033.251
EC Number	(anhydrous): 236-591-9; (tetrahydrate): 629-337-7
PubChem CID	(anhydrous): 83471; (tetrahydrate): 19915385
UNII	(anhydrous): U70U4T7N6S; (tetrahydrate): 8308V6RBJ5
CompTox Dashboard (EPA)	(anhydrous): DTXSID2065460
- InChI: InChI=1S/2BrH.Mn/h2*1H;/q;;+2/p-2 Key: RJYMRRJVDRJMJW-UHFFFAOYSA-L; (anhydrous): InChI=1/2BrH.Mn/h2*1H;/q;;+2/p-2 Key: RJYMRRJVDRJMJW-NUQVWONBAV; (tetrahydrate): InChI=1S/2BrH.Mn.4H2O/h2*1H;;4*1H2/q;;+2;;;;/p-2 Key: HHDPJRSXPOGIOP-UHFFFAOYSA-L
- SMILES: (anhydrous): [Mn](Br)Br; (tetrahydrate): O.O.O.O.[Mn+2].[Br-].[Br-]

Properties
Chemical formula	MnBr_{2}
Molar mass	214.746 g/mol (anhydrous); 286.60 g/mol (tetrahydrate)
Appearance	pink crystalline
Density	4.385 g/cm^{3}
Melting point	698 °C (1,288 °F; 971 K) (anhydrous); 64 °C (tetrahydrate)
Boiling point	1,027 °C (1,881 °F; 1,300 K)
Solubility in water	146 g/100 mL at 20 °C
Magnetic susceptibility (χ)	+13,900·10^{−6} cm^{3}/mol

Structure
Crystal structure	Trigonal, hP3, SpaceGroup = P-3m1, No. 164
Coordination geometry	octahedral

Hazards
- GHS labelling
Pictograms	(GHS07: Exclamation mark)
Signal word	Warning
Hazard statements	H302, H312, H332
Precautionary statements	P280
NFPA 704 (fire diamond)	1 0 1
Flash point	Non-flammable

Related compounds
Other anions	Manganese(II) fluoride Manganese(II) chloride Manganese(II) iodide
Other cations	Iron(II) bromide Cobalt(II) bromide Manganese(III) bromide
- Except where otherwise noted, data are given for materials in their standard state (at 25 °C [77 °F], 100 kPa). verify (what is ?) Infobox references

Manganese(II) bromide is the chemical compound composed of manganese and bromine with the formula MnBr_{2}.

It can be used in place of palladium in the Stille reaction, which couples two carbon atoms using an organotin compound.
