= Manganese(III) acetate =

Manganese triacetate
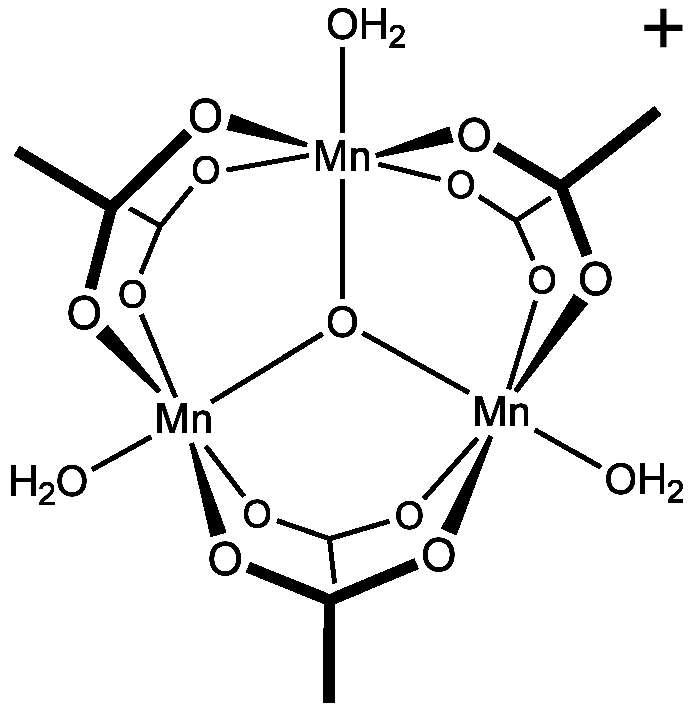

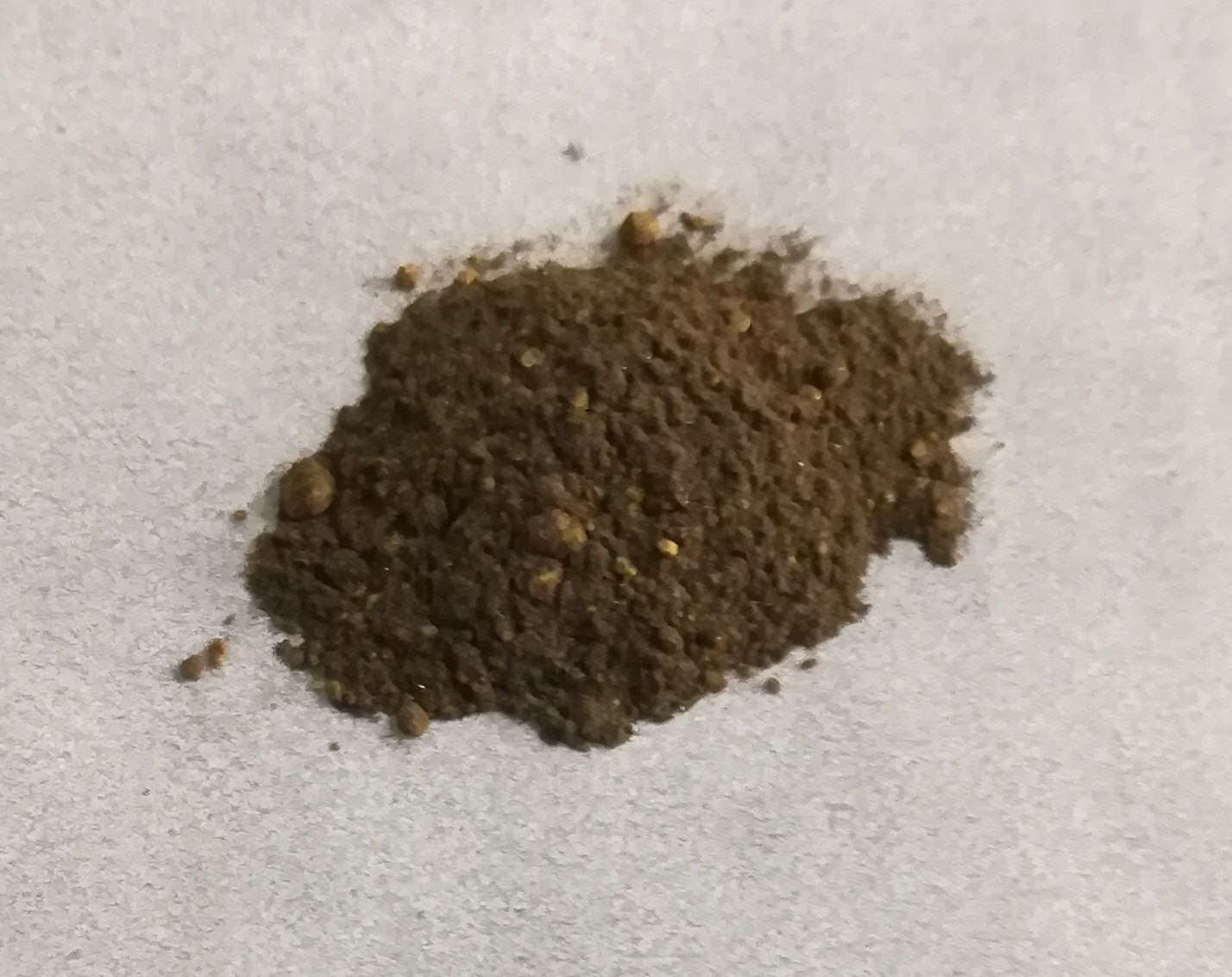

Names
- IUPAC name Manganese triacetate
- Other names: Manganese triacetate dihydrate; Manganese(III) acetate dihydrate; Manganic acetate

Identifiers
| CAS Number | 19513-05-4 (dihydrate); 26935-72-8 (HMn_{3}O(OAc)_{8} polymer); 993-02-2 (anhydrous) |
| 3D model (JSmol) | Interactive image; coordination complex: Interactive image |
| ChemSpider | 141084 |
| ECHA InfoCard | 100.012.365 |
| EC Number | 213-602-5 |
| PubChem CID | 160554 |
| CompTox Dashboard (EPA) | DTXSID70244030 |
- InChI: InChI=1S/3C2H4O2.Mn/c3*1-2(3)4;/h3*1H3,(H,3,4);/q;;;+3/p-3 Key: AHSBSUVHXDIAEY-UHFFFAOYSA-K; InChI=1/3C2H4O2.Mn/c3*1-2(3)4;/h3*1H3,(H,3,4);/q;;;+3/p-3 Key: AHSBSUVHXDIAEY-DFZHHIFOAL
- SMILES: [Mn+3].O=C([O-])C.[O-]C(=O)C.[O-]C(=O)C; coordination complex: O1[C-](C)O[Mn+3]6([O-2]23)([OH])(O[C-](C)O4)O[C-](C)O[Mn+3]24([OH])(O[C-](C)O5)O[C-](C)O[Mn+3]135([OH])O[C-](C)O6

Properties
| Chemical formula | C_{6}H_{9}MnO_{6}•2H_{2}O |
| Molar mass | 268.13 g/mol (dihydrate) |
| Appearance | Brown powder |
| Density | 1.049 g cm^{−3}, liquid; 1.266 g cm^{−3}, solid |

Hazards
- GHS labelling
| Pictograms | (GHS07: Exclamation mark) |
| Signal word | Warning |
| Hazard statements | H315, H319, H335 |
| Precautionary statements | P261, P264, P271, P280, P302+P352, P304+P340, P305+P351+P338, P312, P321, P332+P313, P337+P313, P362, P403+P233, P405, P501 |
- Except where otherwise noted, data are given for materials in their standard state (at 25 °C [77 °F], 100 kPa). verify (what is ?) Infobox references

Manganese(III) acetate describes a family of materials with the approximate formula Mn(O_{2}CCH_{3})_{3}. These materials are brown solids that are soluble in acetic acid and water. They are used in organic synthesis as oxidizing agents.

== Structure ==
Although manganese(III) triacetate has not been reported, salts of basic manganese(III) acetate are well characterized. Basic manganese acetate adopts the structure reminiscent of those of basic chromium acetate and basic iron acetate. The formula is [Mn_{3}O(O_{2}CCH_{3})_{6}L_{n}]X where L is a ligand and X is an anion. The salt [Mn_{3}O(O_{2}CCH_{3})_{6}]O_{2}CCH_{3}^{.}HO_{2}CCH_{3} has been confirmed by X-ray crystallography.

== Preparation ==
It is usually used as the dihydrate, although the anhydrous form is also used in some situations. The dihydrate is prepared by combining potassium permanganate and manganese(II) acetate in acetic acid. Addition of acetic anhydride to the reaction produces the anhydrous form. It is also synthesized by electrochemical method starting from Mn(OAc)_{2}.

== Use in organic synthesis ==
Manganese triacetate has been used as an oxidant in radical cyclizations. It can oxidize alkenes via addition of acetic acid to form lactones.

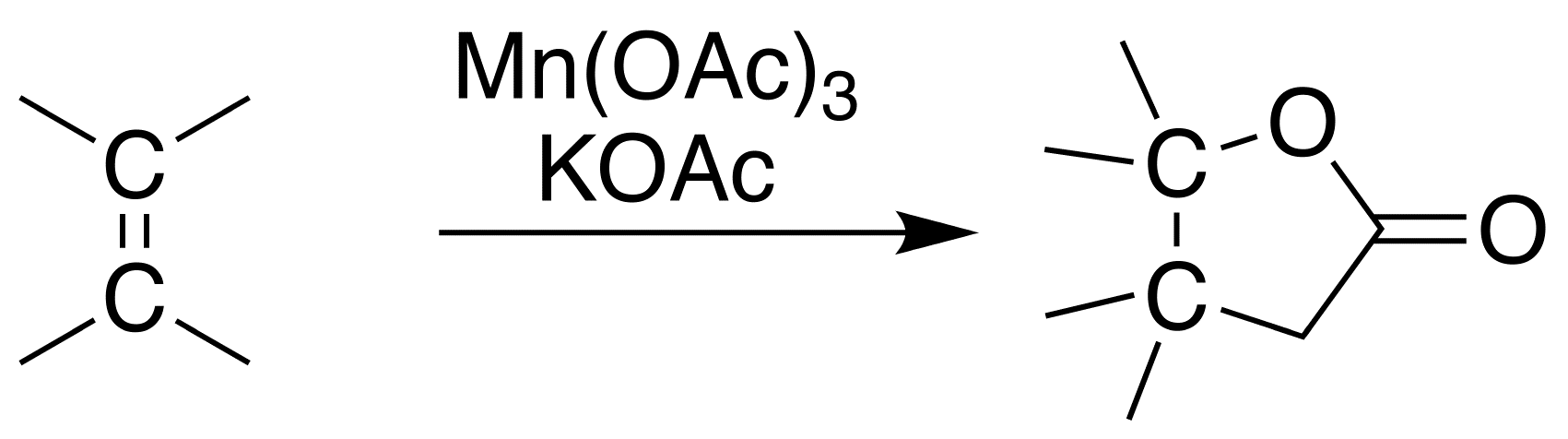

This process is thought to proceed through rate determining enolization followed by intramolecular electron transfer to form [{Mn_{3}}–enolate]• radical intermediates (e.g., [{Mn_{3}}–enolate]), instead of free •CH_{2}CO_{2}H radical intermediates, which then react with the alkene, followed by additional oxidation steps and finally ring closure. When the alkene is not symmetric, the major product depends on the nature of the alkene, and is consistent with initial formation of the more stable radical (among the two carbons of the alkene) followed by ring closure onto the more stable conformation of the intermediate.

When reacted with enones, the carbon on the other side of the carbonyl reacts rather than the alkene portion, leading to α'-acetoxy enones. In this process, the carbon next to the carbonyl is oxidized by the manganese, followed by transfer of acetate from the manganese to it. It can similarly oxidize β-ketoesters at the α carbon, and this intermediate can react with various other structures, including halides and alkenes (see: manganese-mediated coupling reactions). One extension of this idea is the cyclization of the ketoester portion of the molecule with an alkene elsewhere in the same structure.

== See also ==
- Manganese(III) chloride
- Manganese(II) acetate
- Chromium(III) acetate
- Iron(III) acetate
- Zinc acetate
