= Group 7 element =

Group of chemical elements

Group 7 in the periodic table
Hydrogen																															Helium
Lithium	Beryllium																									Boron	Carbon	Nitrogen	Oxygen	Fluorine	Neon
Sodium	Magnesium																									Aluminium	Silicon	Phosphorus	Sulfur	Chlorine	Argon
Potassium	Calcium															Scandium	Titanium	Vanadium	Chromium	Manganese	Iron	Cobalt	Nickel	Copper	Zinc	Gallium	Germanium	Arsenic	Selenium	Bromine	Krypton
Rubidium	Strontium															Yttrium	Zirconium	Niobium	Molybdenum	Technetium	Ruthenium	Rhodium	Palladium	Silver	Cadmium	Indium	Tin	Antimony	Tellurium	Iodine	Xenon
Caesium	Barium	Lanthanum	Cerium	Praseodymium	Neodymium	Promethium	Samarium	Europium	Gadolinium	Terbium	Dysprosium	Holmium	Erbium	Thulium	Ytterbium	Lutetium	Hafnium	Tantalum	Tungsten	Rhenium	Osmium	Iridium	Platinum	Gold	Mercury (element)	Thallium	Lead	Bismuth	Polonium	Astatine	Radon
Francium	Radium	Actinium	Thorium	Protactinium	Uranium	Neptunium	Plutonium	Americium	Curium	Berkelium	Californium	Einsteinium	Fermium	Mendelevium	Nobelium	Lawrencium	Rutherfordium	Dubnium	Seaborgium	Bohrium	Hassium	Meitnerium	Darmstadtium	Roentgenium	Copernicium	Nihonium	Flerovium	Moscovium	Livermorium	Tennessine	Oganesson
group 6 ← → group 8
IUPAC group number	7
Name by element	manganese group
CAS group number (US, pattern A-B-A)	VIIB
old IUPAC number (Europe, pattern A-B)	VIIA

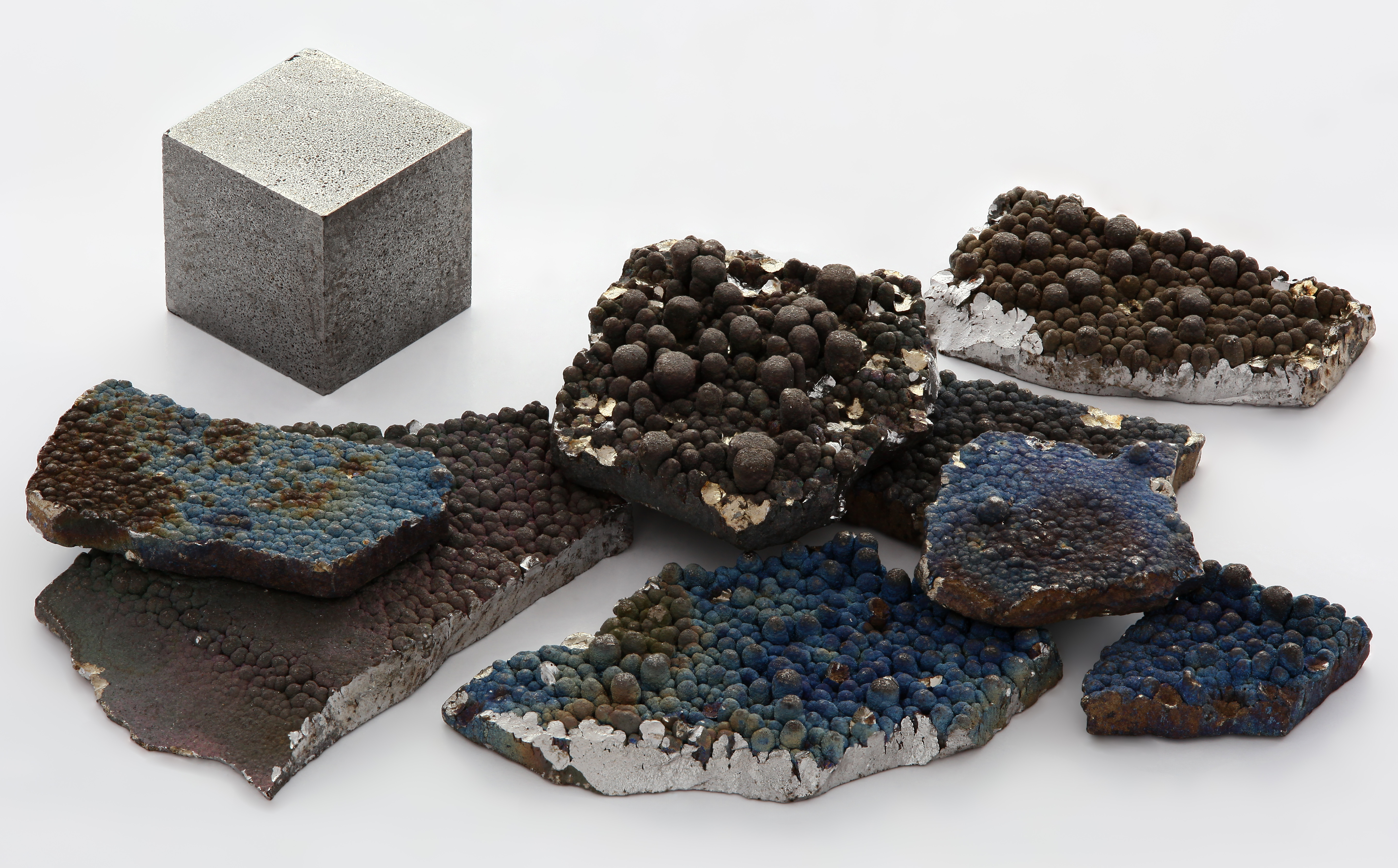
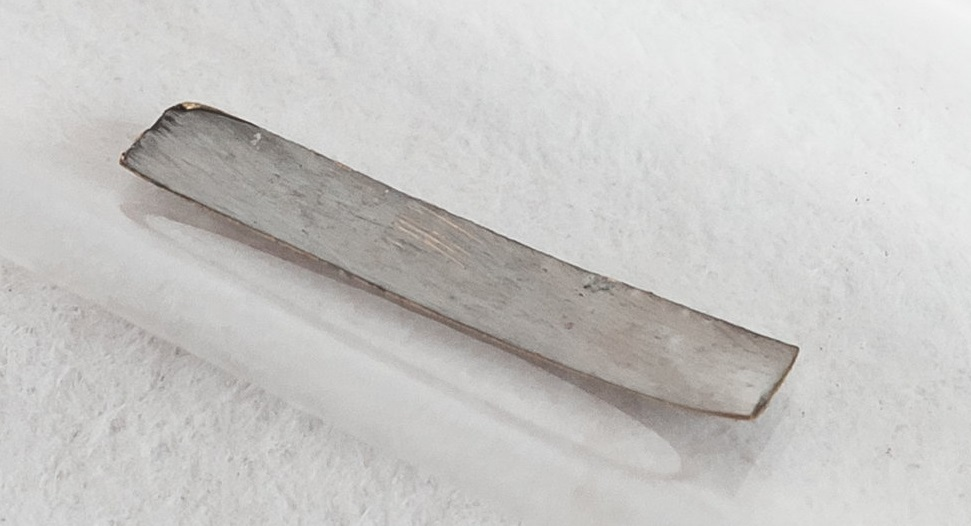
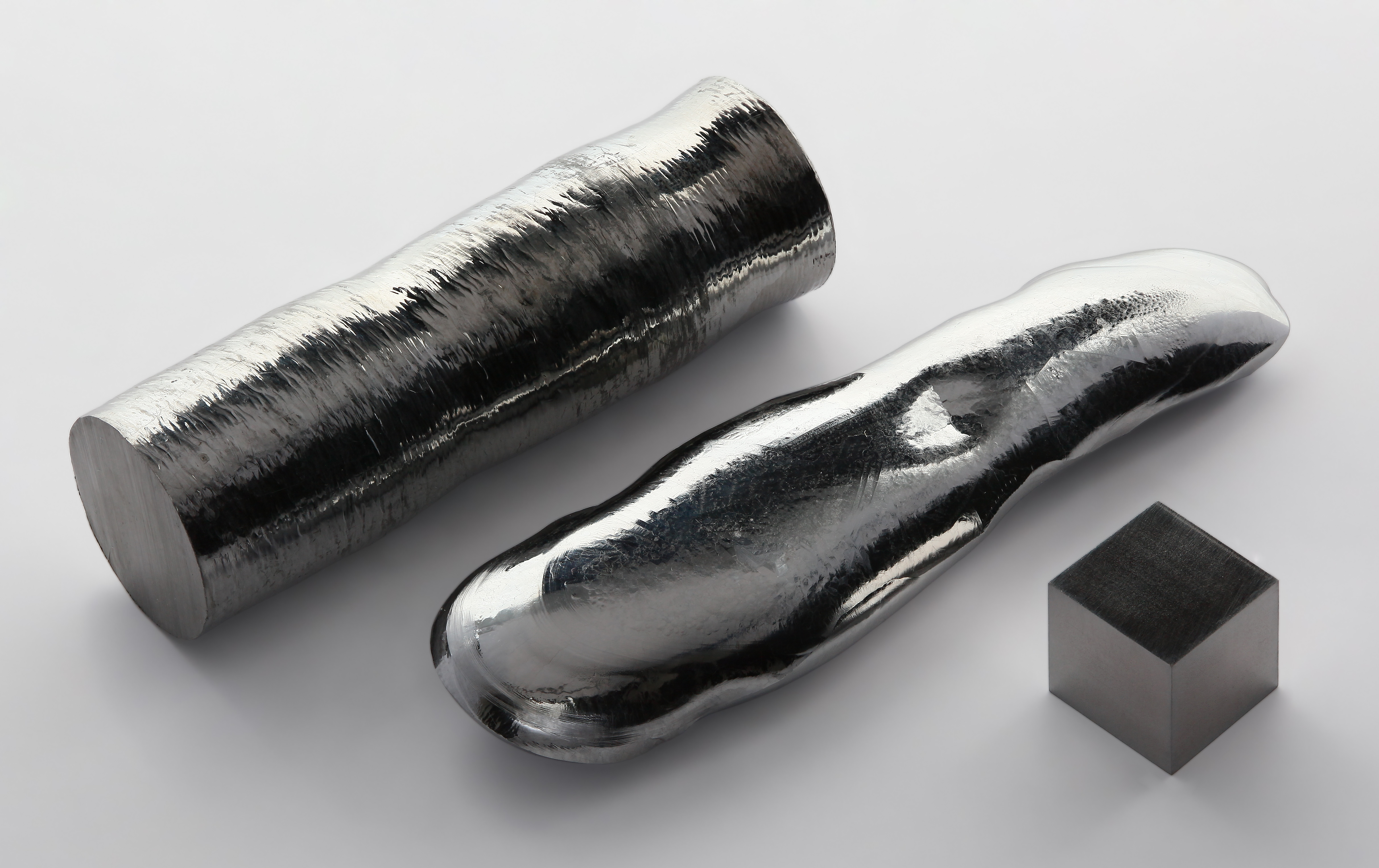
↓ Period
4	Manganese (Mn); 25 Transition metal
5	Technetium (Tc); 43 Transition metal
6	Rhenium (Re); 75 Transition metal
7	Bohrium (Bh); 107 Transition metal
Legend primordial element element by radioactive decay synthetic element

Group 7, numbered by IUPAC nomenclature, is a group of elements in the periodic table. It contains manganese (Mn), technetium (Tc), rhenium (Re) and bohrium (Bh). This group lies in the d-block of the periodic table, and are hence transition metals. This group is sometimes called the manganese group or manganese family after its lightest member; however, the group itself has not acquired a trivial name because it belongs to the broader grouping of the transition metals.

The group 7 elements tend to have a major group oxidation state (+7), although this trend is markedly less coherent than the previous groups. Like other groups, the members of this family show patterns in their electron configurations, especially the outermost shells resulting in trends in chemical behavior. In nature, manganese is a fairly common element, whereas rhenium is rare, technetium only occurs in trace quantities, and bohrium is entirely synthetic.

== Physical properties ==
The trends in group 7 follow, although less noticeably, those of the other early d-block groups and reflect the addition of a filled f-shell into the core in passing from the fifth to the sixth period. All group 7 elements crystallize in the hexagonal close packed (hcp) structure except manganese, which crystallizes in the body centered cubic (bcc) structure. Bohrium is also expected to crystallize in the hcp structure.

The table below is a summary of the key physical properties of the group 7 elements. The properties of bohrium are either unknown or predicted, as they have not been measured.

Properties of the group 7 elements
Name	Mn, manganese	Tc, technetium	Re, rhenium	Bh, bohrium
Melting point	1519 K (1246 °C)	2430 K (2157 °C)	3459 K (3186 °C)	Unknown
Boiling point	2334 K (2061 °C)	4538 K (4265 °C)	5903 K (5630 °C)	Unknown
Density	7.21 g·cm^{−3}	11 g·cm^{−3}	21.02 g·cm^{−3}	26-27 g·cm^{−3}?
Appearance	silvery metallic	silvery-gray	silvery-gray	Unknown
Atomic radius	127 pm	136 pm	137 pm	128 pm?

== Chemical properties ==
Like other groups, the members of this family show patterns in its electron configuration, especially the outermost shells:

Z	Element	Electrons per shell
25	manganese	2, 8, 13, 2
43	technetium	2, 8, 18, 13, 2
75	rhenium	2, 8, 18, 32, 13, 2
107	bohrium	2, 8, 18, 32, 32, 13, 2

All the members of the group readily portray their group oxidation state of +7 and the state becomes more stable as the group is descended. Technetium also shows a stable +4 state whilst rhenium exhibits stable +4 and +3 states.

Bohrium may therefore also show these lower states as well. The higher +7 oxidation state is more likely to exist in oxyanions, such as perbohrate, BhO_{4}^{−}, analogous to the lighter permanganate, pertechnetate, and perrhenate. Nevertheless, bohrium(VII) is likely to be unstable in aqueous solution, and would probably be easily reduced to the more stable bohrium(IV).

== Compounds ==
=== Oxides ===
==== Manganese ====
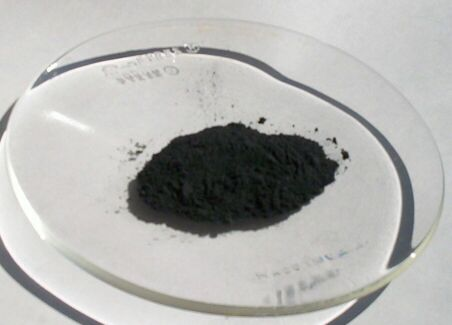
Manganese(IV) oxide

Manganese forms a variety of oxides: MnO, Mn_{3}O_{4}, Mn_{2}O_{3}, MnO_{2}, MnO_{3} and Mn_{2}O_{7}. Manganese(II) oxide is an inorganic compound that forms green crystals. Like many monoxides, MnO adopts the rock salt structure, where cations and anions are both octahedrally coordinated. Also like many oxides, manganese(II) oxide is often nonstoichiometric: its composition can vary from MnO to MnO_{1.045}. Manganese(II,III) oxide is formed when any manganese oxide is heated in air above 1000 °C. Considerable research has centred on producing nanocrystalline Mn_{3}O_{4} and various syntheses that involve oxidation of Mn^{II} or reduction of Mn^{VI}. Manganese(III) oxide is unlike many other transition metal oxides in that it does not adopt the corundum (Al_{2}O_{3}) structure. Two forms are generally recognized, α-Mn_{2}O_{3} and γ-Mn_{2}O_{3}, although a high pressure form with the CaIrO_{3} structure has been reported too. Manganese(IV) oxide is a blackish or brown solid occurs naturally as the mineral pyrolusite, which is the main ore of manganese and a component of manganese nodules. The principal use for MnO_{2} is for dry-cell batteries, such as the alkaline battery and the zinc–carbon battery. Manganese(VII) oxide is dark green in its crystalline form. The liquid is green by reflected light and red by transmitted light. It is soluble in carbon tetrachloride, and decomposes when in contact with water.

==== Technetium ====
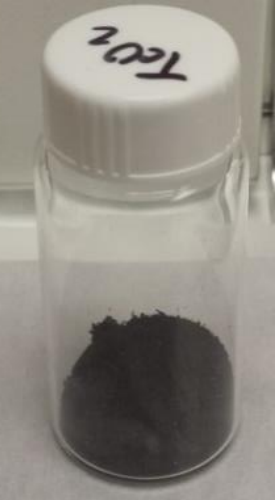
Technetium(IV) oxide

Technetium's main oxides are technetium(IV) oxide and technetium(VII) oxide. Technetium(IV) oxide was first produced in 1949 by electrolyzing a solution of ammonium pertechnetate under ammonium hydroxide. It has often been used to separate technetium from molybdenum and rhenium. More efficient ways are the reduction of ammonium pertechnetate by zinc metal and hydrochloric acid, stannous chloride, hydrazine, hydroxylamine, ascorbic acid, by the hydrolysis of potassium hexachlorotechnetate or by the decomposition of ammonium pertechnetate at 700 °C under an inert atmosphere. It reacts with oxygen to produce technetium(VII) oxide at 450 °C.

Technetium(VII) oxide can be prepared directly by the oxidation of technetium at 450-500 °C. It is a rare example of a molecular binary metal oxide. Other examples are ruthenium(VIII) oxide and osmium(VIII) oxide. It adopts a centrosymmetric corner-shared bi-tetrahedral structure in which the terminal and bridging Tc−O bonds are 167pm and 184 pm respectively and the Tc−O−Tc angle is 180°.

==== Rhenium ====
Rhenium's main oxides are rhenium(IV) oxide and rhenium(VII) oxide. Rhenium(IV) oxide is a gray to black crystalline solid that can be formed by comproportionation. At high temperatures it undergoes disproportionation. It is a laboratory reagent that can be used as a catalyst. It adopts the rutile structure. It forms perrhenates with alkaline hydrogen peroxide and oxidizing acids. In molten sodium hydroxide it forms sodium rhenate:

2 NaOH + ReO_{2} → Na_{2}ReO_{3} + H_{2}O

Rhenium(VII) oxide can be formed when rhenium or its oxides or sulfides are oxidized a 500-700 °C in air. It dissolves in water to give perrhenic acid. Heating Re_{2}O_{7} gives rhenium(IV) oxide, signalled by the appearance of the dark blue coloration. In its solid form, Re_{2}O_{7} consists of alternating octahedral and tetrahedral Re centres. It is the raw material for all rhenium compounds, being the volatile fraction obtained upon roasting the host ore.

Rhenium, in addition to the +4 and +7 oxidation states, also forms a trioxide. It can be formed by reducing rhenium(VII) oxide with carbon monoxide at 200 C or elemental rhenium at 4000 C. It can also be reduced with dioxane. It is a red solid with a metallic lustre that resembles copper in appearance, and is the only stable trioxide of the group 7 elements.

=== Halides ===
==== Manganese ====
Manganese can form compounds in the +2, +3 and +4 oxidation states. The manganese(II) compounds are often light pink solids. Like some other metal difluorides, MnF_{2} crystallizes in the rutile structure, which features octahedral Mn centers. and it is used in the manufacture of special kinds of glass and lasers. Scacchite is the natural, anhydrous form of manganese(II) chloride. The only other currently known mineral systematized as manganese chloride is kempite - a representative of the atacamite group, a group of hydroxide-chlorides. It can be used in place of palladium in the Stille reaction, which couples two carbon atoms using an organotin compound. It can be used as a pink pigment or as a source of the manganese ion or iodide ion. It is often used in the lighting industry.

==== Technetium ====
The following binary (containing only two elements) technetium halides are known: TcF_{6}, TcF_{5}, TcCl_{4}, TcBr_{4}, TcBr_{3}, α-TcCl_{3}, β-TcCl_{3}, TcI_{3}, α-TcCl_{2}, and β-TcCl_{2}. The oxidation states range from Tc(VI) to Tc(II). Technetium halides exhibit different structure types, such as molecular octahedral complexes, extended chains, layered sheets, and metal clusters arranged in a three-dimensional network. These compounds are produced by combining the metal and halogen or by less direct reactions.

TcCl_{4} is obtained by chlorination of Tc metal or Tc_{2}O_{7} Upon heating, TcCl_{4} gives the corresponding Tc(III) and Tc(II) chlorides.

TcCl_{4} → α-TcCl_{3} + 1/2 Cl_{2}
TcCl_{3} → β-TcCl_{2} + 1/2 Cl_{2}

The structure of TcCl_{4} is composed of infinite zigzag chains of edge-sharing TcCl_{6} octahedra. It is isomorphous to transition metal tetrachlorides of zirconium, hafnium, and platinum.

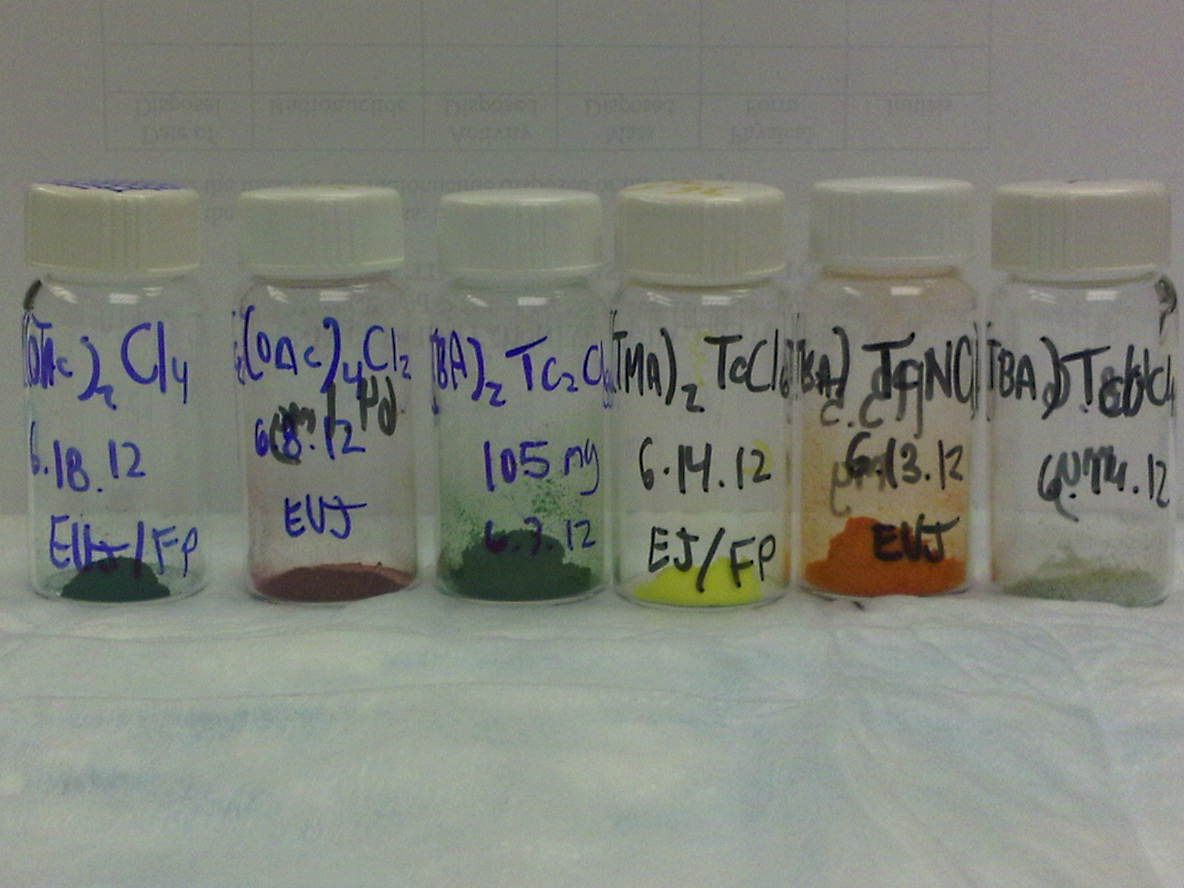
Chloro-containing coordination complexes of technetium (Tc-99) in various oxidation states: Tc(III), Tc(IV), Tc(V), and Tc(VI) represented.

Two polymorphs of technetium trichloride exist, α- and β-TcCl_{3}. The α polymorph is also denoted as Tc_{3}Cl_{9}. It adopts a confacial bioctahedral structure. It is prepared by treating the chloro-acetate Tc_{2}(O_{2}CCH_{3})_{4}Cl_{2} with HCl. Like Re_{3}Cl_{9}, the structure of the α-polymorph consists of triangles with short M-M distances. β-TcCl_{3} features octahedral Tc centers, which are organized in pairs, as seen also for molybdenum trichloride. TcBr_{3} does not adopt the structure of either trichloride phase. Instead it has the structure of molybdenum tribromide, consisting of chains of confacial octahedra with alternating short and long Tc—Tc contacts. TcI_{3} has the same structure as the high temperature phase of TiI_{3}, featuring chains of confacial octahedra with equal Tc—Tc contacts.

Several anionic technetium halides are known. The binary tetrahalides can be converted to the hexahalides [TcX_{6}]^{2−} (X = F, Cl, Br, I), which adopt octahedral molecular geometry. More reduced halides form anionic clusters with Tc–Tc bonds. The situation is similar for the related elements of Mo, W, Re. These clusters have the nuclearity Tc_{4}, Tc_{6}, Tc_{8}, and Tc_{13}. The more stable Tc_{6} and Tc_{8} clusters have prism shapes where vertical pairs of Tc atoms are connected by triple bonds and the planar atoms by single bonds. Every technetium atom makes six bonds, and the remaining valence electrons can be saturated by one axial and two bridging ligand halogen atoms such as chlorine or bromine.

==== Rhenium ====
The most common rhenium chlorides are ReCl_{6}, ReCl_{5}, ReCl_{4}, and ReCl_{3}. The structures of these compounds often feature extensive Re-Re bonding, which is characteristic of this metal in oxidation states lower than VII. Salts of [Re_{2}Cl_{8}]^{2−} feature a quadruple metal-metal bond. Although the highest rhenium chloride features Re(VI), fluorine gives the d^{0} Re(VII) derivative rhenium heptafluoride. Bromides and iodides of rhenium are also well known.

Like tungsten and molybdenum, with which it shares chemical similarities, rhenium forms a variety of oxyhalides. The oxychlorides are most common, and include ReOCl_{4}, ReOCl_{3}.

=== Organometallic compounds ===
==== Manganese ====
Organomanganese compounds were first reported in 1937 by Gilman and Bailee who described the reaction of phenyllithium and manganese(II) iodide to form phenylmanganese iodide (PhMnI) and diphenylmanganese (Ph_{2}Mn).

Following this precedent, other organomanganese halides can be obtained by alkylation of manganese(II) chloride, manganese(II) bromide, and manganese(II) iodide. Manganese iodide is attractive because the anhydrous compound can be prepared in situ from manganese and iodine in ether. Typical alkylating agents are organolithium or organomagnesium compounds.

The chemistry of organometallic compounds of Mn(II) are unusual among the transition metals due to the high ionic character of the Mn(II)-C bond. The reactivity of organomanganese compounds can be compared to that of organomagnesium and organozinc compounds. The electronegativity of Mn (1.55) is comparable to that of Mg (1.31) and Zn (1.65), making the carbon atom (EN = 2.55) nucleophilic. The reduction potential of Mn is also intermediate between Mg and Zn.

==== Technetium ====
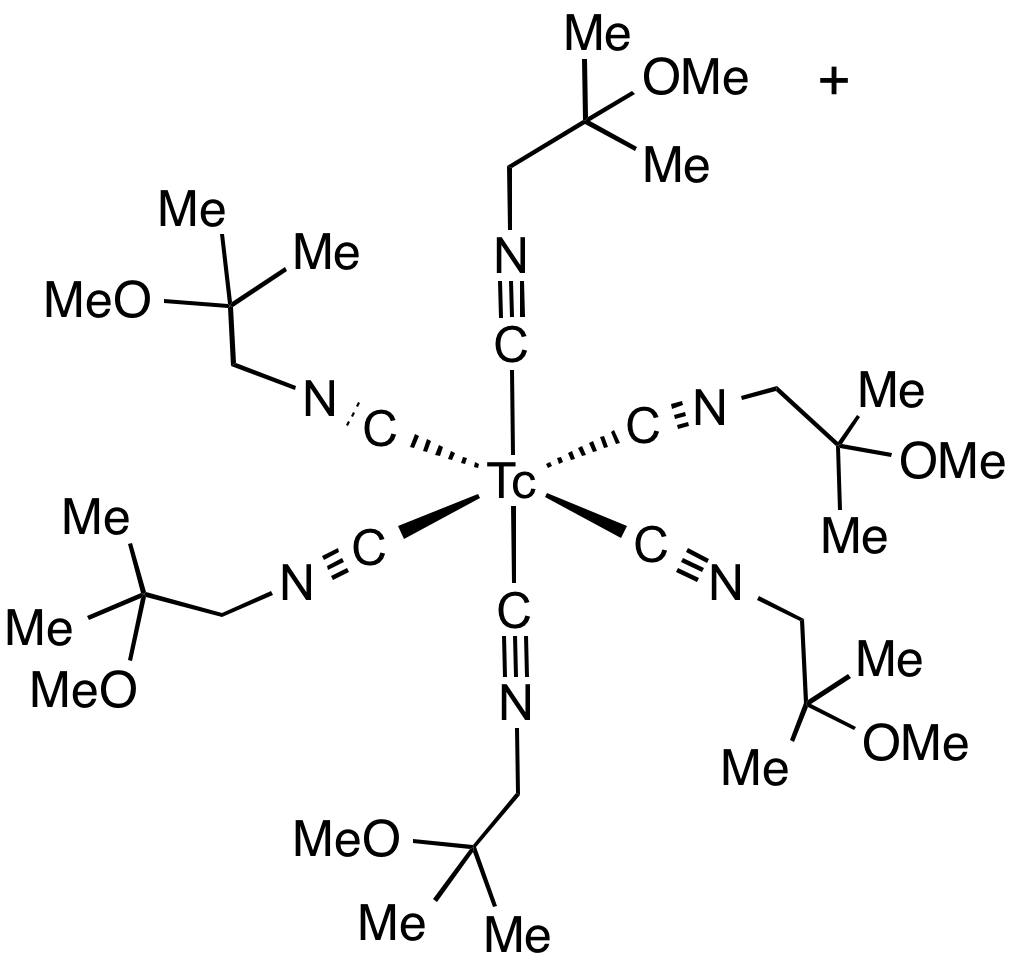
Technetium (99mTc) sestamibi ("Cardiolite") is widely used for imaging of the heart.

Technetium forms a variety of coordination complexes with organic ligands. Many have been well-investigated because of their relevance to nuclear medicine.

Technetium forms a variety of compounds with Tc–C bonds, i.e. organotechnetium complexes. Prominent members of this class are complexes with CO, arene, and cyclopentadienyl ligands. The binary carbonyl Tc_{2}(CO)_{10} is a white volatile solid. In this molecule, two technetium atoms are bound to each other; each atom is surrounded by octahedra of five carbonyl ligands. The bond length between technetium atoms, 303 pm, is significantly larger than the distance between two atoms in metallic technetium (272 pm). Similar carbonyls are formed by technetium's congeners, manganese and rhenium. Interest in organotechnetium compounds has also been motivated by applications in nuclear medicine. Unusual for other metal carbonyls, Tc forms aquo-carbonyl complexes, prominent being [Tc(CO)_{3}(H_{2}O)_{3}]^{+}.

==== Rhenium ====
Dirhenium decacarbonyl is the most common entry to organorhenium chemistry. Its reduction with sodium amalgam gives Na[Re(CO)_{5}] with rhenium in the formal oxidation state −1. Dirhenium decacarbonyl can be oxidised with bromine to bromopentacarbonylrhenium(I):

Re_{2}(CO)_{10} + Br_{2} → 2 Re(CO)_{5}Br

Reduction of this pentacarbonyl with zinc and acetic acid gives pentacarbonylhydridorhenium:

Re(CO)_{5}Br + Zn + HOAc → Re(CO)_{5}H + ZnBr(OAc)

Methylrhenium trioxide ("MTO"), CH_{3}ReO_{3} is a volatile, colourless solid has been used as a catalyst in some laboratory experiments. It can be prepared by many routes, a typical method is the reaction of Re_{2}O_{7} and tetramethyltin:

Re_{2}O_{7} + (CH_{3})_{4}Sn → CH_{3}ReO_{3} + (CH_{3})_{3}SnOReO_{3}

Analogous alkyl and aryl derivatives are known. MTO catalyses for the oxidations with hydrogen peroxide. Terminal alkynes yield the corresponding acid or ester, internal alkynes yield diketones, and alkenes give epoxides. MTO also catalyses the conversion of aldehydes and diazoalkanes into an alkene.

=== Polyoxometalates ===
The polyoxotechnetate (polyoxometalate of technetium) contains both Tc(V) and Tc(VII) in ratio 4: 16 and is obtained as the hydronium salt [H_{7}O_{3}]_{4}[Tc_{20}O_{68}]·4H_{2}O by concentrating an HTcO_{4} solution. The first empirically isolated polyoxorhenate was the white [Re_{4}O_{15}]^{2−} and contained Re(VII) in both octahedral and tetrahedral coordination.

== History ==
=== Manganese ===
Manganese dioxide, which is abundant in nature, has long been used as a pigment. The cave paintings in Gargas that are 30,000 to 24,000 years old are made from the mineral form of MnO_{2} pigments. Manganese compounds were used by Egyptian and Roman glassmakers, either to add to, or remove, color from glass. Use as "glassmakers soap" continued through the Middle Ages until modern times and is evident in 14th-century glass from Venice.

=== Technetium and rhenium ===
Rhenium (Latin: Rhenus meaning: "Rhine") was the last-discovered of the elements that have a stable isotope (other new elements discovered in nature since then, such as francium, are radioactive). The existence of a yet-undiscovered element at this position in the periodic table had been first predicted by Dmitri Mendeleev. Other calculated information was obtained by Henry Moseley in 1914. In 1908, Japanese chemist Masataka Ogawa announced that he had discovered the 43rd element and named it nipponium (Np) after Japan (Nippon in Japanese). In fact, what he had was rhenium (element 75), not technetium. The symbol Np was later used for the element neptunium, and the name "nihonium", also named after Japan, along with symbol Nh, was later used for element 113. Element 113 was also discovered by a team of Japanese scientists and was named in respectful homage to Ogawa's work.

Rhenium was rediscovered by Walter Noddack, Ida Noddack, and Otto Berg in Germany. In 1925 they reported that they had detected the element in platinum ore and in the mineral columbite. They also found rhenium in gadolinite and molybdenite. In 1928 they were able to extract 1 g of the element by processing 660 kg of molybdenite. It was estimated in 1968 that 75% of the rhenium metal in the United States was used for research and the development of refractory metal alloys. It took several years from that point before the superalloys became widely used.

The discovery of element 43 was finally confirmed in a 1937 experiment at the University of Palermo in Sicily by Carlo Perrier and Emilio Segrè. In mid-1936, Segrè visited the United States, first Columbia University in New York and then the Lawrence Berkeley National Laboratory in California. He persuaded cyclotron inventor Ernest Lawrence to let him take back some discarded cyclotron parts that had become radioactive. Lawrence mailed him a molybdenum foil that had been part of the deflector in the cyclotron.

=== Bohrium ===
Two groups claimed discovery of the element bohrium. Evidence of bohrium was first reported in 1976 by a Soviet research team led by Yuri Oganessian, in which targets of bismuth-209 and lead-208 were bombarded with accelerated nuclei of chromium-54 and manganese-55 respectively. Two activities, one with a half-life of one to two milliseconds, and the other with an approximately five-second half-life, were seen. Since the ratio of the intensities of these two activities was constant throughout the experiment, it was proposed that the first was from the isotope bohrium-261 and that the second was from its daughter dubnium-257. Later, the dubnium isotope was corrected to dubnium-258, which indeed has a five-second half-life (dubnium-257 has a one-second half-life); however, the half-life observed for its parent is much shorter than the half-lives later observed in the definitive discovery of bohrium at Darmstadt in 1981. The IUPAC/IUPAP Transfermium Working Group (TWG) concluded that while dubnium-258 was probably seen in this experiment, the evidence for the production of its parent bohrium-262 was not convincing enough.

In 1981, a German research team led by Peter Armbruster and Gottfried Münzenberg at the GSI Helmholtz Centre for Heavy Ion Research (GSI Helmholtzzentrum für Schwerionenforschung) in Darmstadt bombarded a target of bismuth-209 with accelerated nuclei of chromium-54 to produce five atoms of the isotope bohrium-262:

^{209}_{83}Bi + ^{54}_{24}Cr → ^{262}_{107}Bh + n

This discovery was further substantiated by their detailed measurements of the alpha decay chain of the produced bohrium atoms to previously known isotopes of fermium and californium. The IUPAC/IUPAP Transfermium Working Group (TWG) recognised the GSI collaboration as official discoverers in their 1992 report.

== Occurrence and production ==
=== Manganese ===
Manganese comprises about 1000 ppm (0.1%) of the Earth's crust and is the 12th most abundant element. Soil contains 7–9000 ppm of manganese with an average of 440 ppm. The atmosphere contains 0.01 μg/m^{3}. Manganese occurs principally as pyrolusite (MnO_{2}), braunite (Mn^{2+}Mn^{3+}_{6})(SiO_{12}), psilomelane (Ba,H_{2}O)_{2}Mn_{5}O_{10}, and to a lesser extent as rhodochrosite (MnCO_{3}).

Percentage of manganese output in 2006 by countries

The most important manganese ore is pyrolusite (MnO_{2}). Other economically important manganese ores usually show a close spatial relation to the iron ores, such as sphalerite. Land-based resources are large but irregularly distributed. About 80% of the known world manganese resources are in South Africa; other important manganese deposits are in Ukraine, Australia, India, China, Gabon and Brazil. According to 1978 estimate, the ocean floor has 500 billion tons of manganese nodules. Attempts to find economically viable methods of harvesting manganese nodules were abandoned in the 1970s.

In South Africa, most identified deposits are located near Hotazel in the Northern Cape Province, with a 2011 estimate of 15 billion tons. In 2011 South Africa produced 3.4 million tons, topping all other nations.

Manganese is mainly mined in South Africa, Australia, China, Gabon, Brazil, India, Kazakhstan, Ghana, Ukraine and Malaysia.

For the production of ferromanganese, the manganese ore is mixed with iron ore and carbon, and then reduced either in a blast furnace or in an electric arc furnace. The resulting ferromanganese has a manganese content of 30 to 80%. Pure manganese used for the production of iron-free alloys is produced by leaching manganese ore with sulfuric acid and a subsequent electrowinning process.

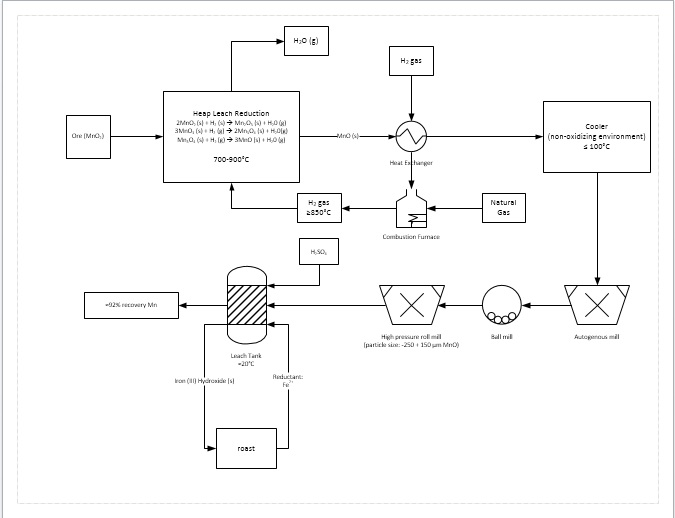
Process flow diagram for a manganese refining circuit.

A more progressive extraction process involves directly reducing (a low grade) manganese ore in a heap leach. This is done by percolating natural gas through the bottom of the heap; the natural gas provides the heat (needs to be at least 850 °C) and the reducing agent (carbon monoxide). This reduces all of the manganese ore to manganese oxide (MnO), which is a leachable form. The ore then travels through a grinding circuit to reduce the particle size of the ore to between 150 and 250 μm, increasing the surface area to aid leaching. The ore is then added to a leach tank of sulfuric acid and ferrous iron (Fe^{2+}) in a 1.6:1 ratio. The iron reacts with the manganese dioxide (MnO_{2}) to form iron(III) oxide-hydroxide (FeO(OH)) and elemental manganese (Mn):

This process yields approximately 92% recovery of the manganese. For further purification, the manganese can then be sent to an electrowinning facility.

In 1972 the CIA's Project Azorian, through billionaire Howard Hughes, commissioned the ship Hughes Glomar Explorer with the cover story of harvesting manganese nodules from the sea floor. That triggered a rush of activity to collect manganese nodules, which was not actually practical. The real mission of Hughes Glomar Explorer was to raise a sunken Soviet submarine, the K-129, with the goal of retrieving Soviet code books.

An abundant resource of manganese in the form of Mn nodules found on the ocean floor. These nodules, which are composed of 29% manganese, are located along the ocean floor and the potential impact of mining these nodules is being researched. Physical, chemical, and biological environmental impacts can occur due to this nodule mining disturbing the seafloor and causing sediment plumes to form. This suspension includes metals and inorganic nutrients, which can lead to contamination of the near-bottom waters from dissolved toxic compounds. Mn nodules are also the grazing grounds, living space, and protection for endo- and epifaunal systems. When theses nodules are removed, these systems are directly affected. Overall, this can cause species to leave the area or completely die off. Prior to the commencement of the mining itself, research is being conducted by United Nations affiliated bodies and state-sponsored companies in an attempt to fully understand environmental impacts in the hopes of mitigating these impacts.

=== Technetium ===
Technetium was created by bombarding molybdenum atoms with deuterons that had been accelerated by a device called a cyclotron. Technetium occurs naturally in the Earth's crust in minute concentrations of about 0.003 parts per trillion. Technetium is so rare because the half-lives of ^{97}Tc and ^{98}Tc are only 4.2 million years. More than a thousand of such periods have passed since the formation of the Earth, so the probability of survival of even one atom of primordial technetium is effectively zero. However, small amounts exist as spontaneous fission products in uranium ores. A kilogram of uranium contains an estimated 1 nanogram (10^{−9} g) equivalent to ten trillion atoms of technetium. Some red giant stars with the spectral types S-, M-, and N contain a spectral absorption line indicating the presence of technetium. These red giants are known informally as technetium stars.

=== Rhenium ===
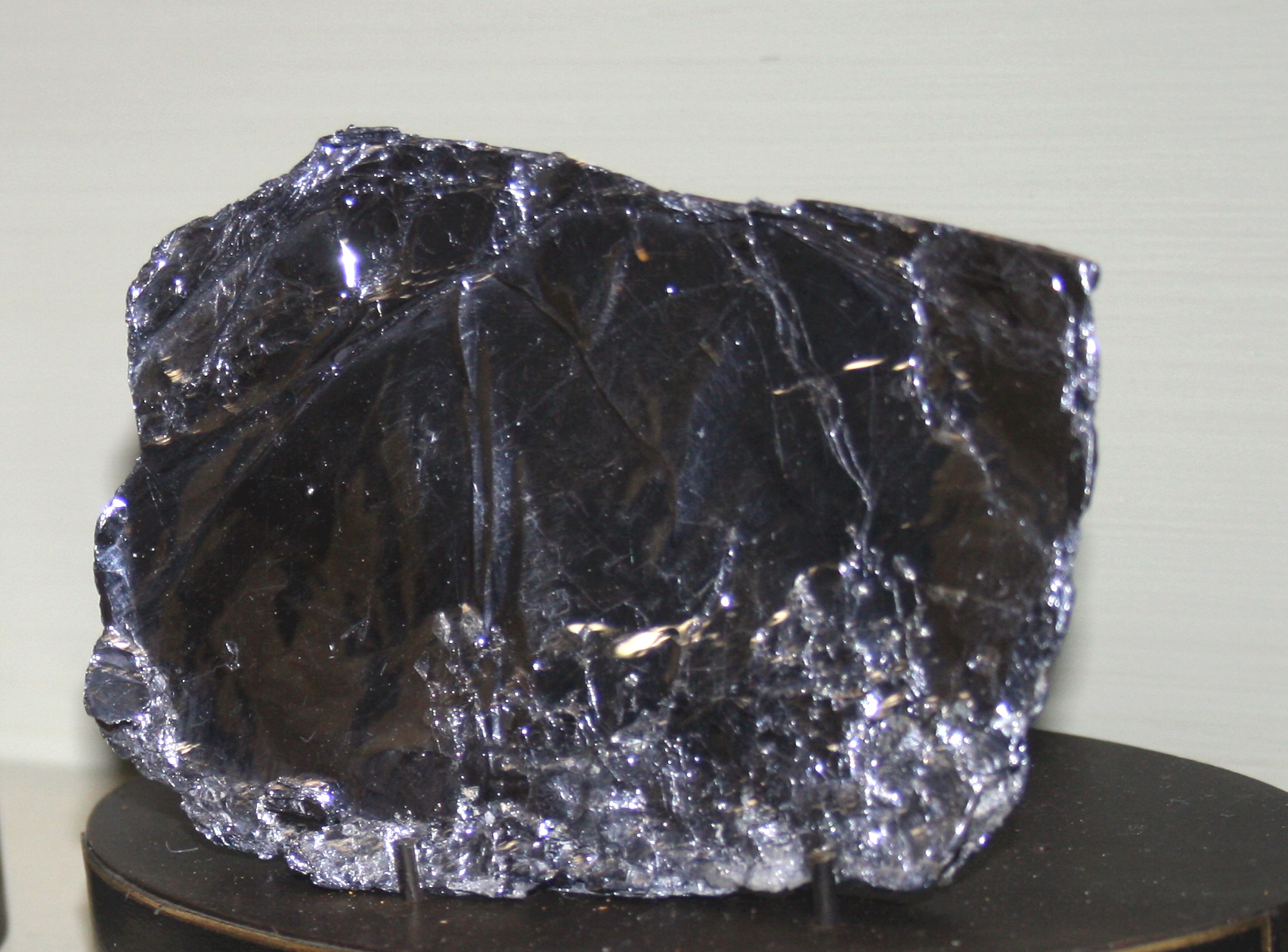
Molybdenite

Rhenium is one of the rarest elements in Earth's crust with an average concentration of 1 ppb; other sources quote the number of 0.5 ppb making it the 77th most abundant element in Earth's crust. Rhenium is probably not found free in nature (its possible natural occurrence is uncertain), but occurs in amounts up to 0.2% in the mineral molybdenite (which is primarily molybdenum disulfide), the major commercial source, although single molybdenite samples with up to 1.88% have been found. Chile has the world's largest rhenium reserves, part of the copper ore deposits, and was the leading producer as of 2005. It was only recently that the first rhenium mineral was found and described (in 1994), a rhenium sulfide mineral (ReS_{2}) condensing from a fumarole on Kudriavy volcano, Iturup island, in the Kuril Islands. Kudriavy discharges up to 20–60 kg rhenium per year mostly in the form of rhenium disulfide. Named rheniite, this rare mineral commands high prices among collectors.

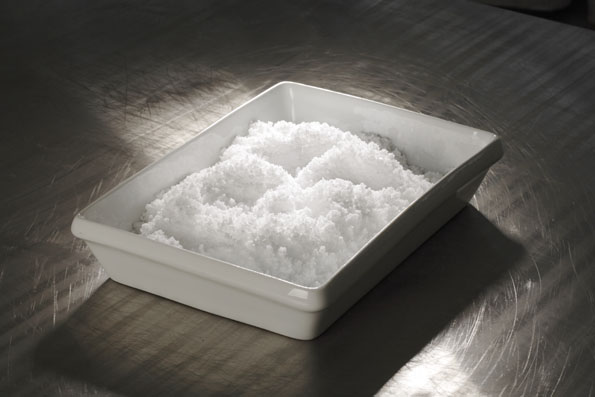
Ammonium perrhenate

Most of the rhenium extracted comes from porphyry molybdenum deposits. These ores typically contain 0.001% to 0.2% rhenium. Roasting the ore volatilizes rhenium oxides. Rhenium(VII) oxide and perrhenic acid readily dissolve in water; they are leached from flue dusts and gasses and extracted by precipitating with potassium or ammonium chloride as the perrhenate salts, and purified by recrystallization. Total world production is between 40 and 50 tons/year; the main producers are in Chile, the United States, Peru, and Poland. Recycling of used Pt-Re catalyst and special alloys allow the recovery of another 10 tons per year. Prices for the metal rose rapidly in early 2008, from $1000–$2000 per kg in 2003–2006 to over $10,000 in February 2008. The metal form is prepared by reducing ammonium perrhenate with hydrogen at high temperatures:

2 NH_{4}ReO_{4} + 7 H_{2} → 2 Re + 8 H_{2}O + 2 NH_{3}
There are technologies for the associated extraction of rhenium from productive solutions of underground leaching of uranium ores.

=== Bohrium ===
Bohrium is a synthetic element that does not occur in nature. Very few atoms have been synthesized, and also due to its radioactivity, only limited research has been conducted. Bohrium is only produced in nuclear reactors and has never been isolated in pure form.

== Applications ==
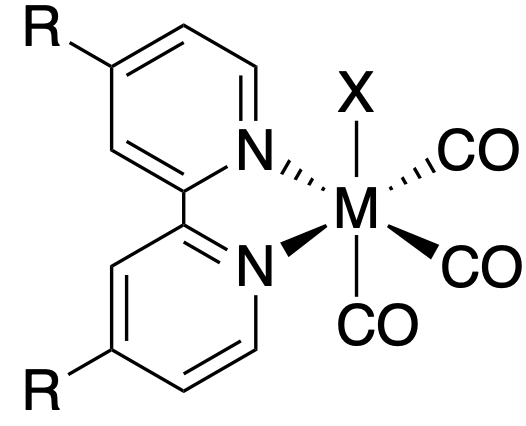
Structure of the facial isomer of M(R-bpy)(CO)_{3}X where M = Mn, Re; X = Cl, Br; R-bpy = 4,4'-disubstituted-2,2'-bipyridine

The facial isomer of both rhenium and manganese 2,2'-bipyridyl tricarbonyl halide complexes have been extensively researched as catalysts for electrochemical carbon dioxide reduction due to their high selectivity and stability. They are commonly abbreviated as M(R-bpy)(CO)_{3}X where M = Mn, Re; R-bpy = 4,4'-disubstituted 2,2'-bipyridine; and X = Cl, Br.

=== Manganese ===
The rarity of rhenium has shifted research toward the manganese version of these catalysts as a more sustainable alternative. The first reports of catalytic activity of Mn(R-bpy)(CO)_{3}Br towards CO_{2} reduction came from Chardon-Noblat and coworkers in 2011. Compared to Re analogs, Mn(R-bpy)(CO)_{3}Br shows catalytic activity at lower overpotentials.

The catalytic mechanism for Mn(R-bpy)(CO)_{3}X is complex and depends on the steric profile of the bipyridine ligand. When R is not bulky, the catalyst dimerizes to form [Mn(R-bpy)(CO)_{3}]_{2} before forming the active species. When R is bulky, however, the complex forms the active species without dimerizing, reducing the overpotential of CO_{2} reduction by 200-300 mV. Unlike Re(R-bpy)(CO)_{3}X, Mn(R-bpy)(CO)_{3}X only reduces CO_{2} in the presence of an acid.

=== Technetium ===
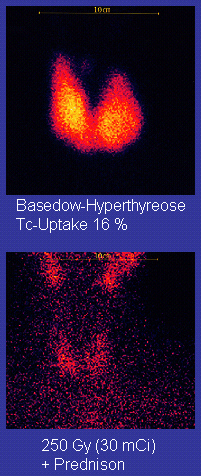
Technetium scintigraphy of a neck of Graves' disease patient

Technetium-99m ("m" indicates that this is a metastable nuclear isomer) is used in radioactive isotope medical tests. For example, Technetium-99m is a radioactive tracer that medical imaging equipment tracks in the human body. It is well suited to the role because it emits readily detectable 140 keV gamma rays, and its half-life is 6.01 hours (meaning that about 94% of it decays to technetium-99 in 24 hours). The chemistry of technetium allows it to be bound to a variety of biochemical compounds, each of which determines how it is metabolized and deposited in the body, and this single isotope can be used for a multitude of diagnostic tests. More than 50 common radiopharmaceuticals are based on technetium-99m for imaging and functional studies of the brain, heart muscle, thyroid, lungs, liver, gall bladder, kidneys, skeleton, blood, and tumors. Technetium-99m is also used in radioimaging.

The longer-lived isotope, technetium-95m with a half-life of 61 days, is used as a radioactive tracer to study the movement of technetium in the environment and in plant and animal systems.

Technetium-99 decays almost entirely by beta decay, emitting beta particles with consistent low energies and no accompanying gamma rays. Moreover, its long half-life means that this emission decreases very slowly with time. It can also be extracted to a high chemical and isotopic purity from radioactive waste. For these reasons, it is a National Institute of Standards and Technology (NIST) standard beta emitter, and is used for equipment calibration. Technetium-99 has also been proposed for optoelectronic devices and nanoscale nuclear batteries.

Like rhenium and palladium, technetium can serve as a catalyst. In processes such as the dehydrogenation of isopropyl alcohol, it is a far more effective catalyst than either rhenium or palladium. However, its radioactivity is a major problem in safe catalytic applications.

When steel is immersed in water, adding a small concentration (55 ppm) of potassium pertechnetate(VII) to the water protects the steel from corrosion, even if the temperature is raised to 250 °C (523 K). For this reason, pertechnetate has been used as an anodic corrosion inhibitor for steel, although technetium's radioactivity poses problems that limit this application to self-contained systems. While (for example) CrO^{2−}_{4} can also inhibit corrosion, it requires a concentration ten times as high. In one experiment, a specimen of carbon steel was kept in an aqueous solution of pertechnetate for 20 years and was still uncorroded. The mechanism by which pertechnetate prevents corrosion is not well understood, but seems to involve the reversible formation of a thin surface layer (passivation). One theory holds that the pertechnetate reacts with the steel surface to form a layer of technetium dioxide which prevents further corrosion; the same effect explains how iron powder can be used to remove pertechnetate from water. The effect disappears rapidly if the concentration of pertechnetate falls below the minimum concentration or if too high a concentration of other ions is added.

As noted, the radioactive nature of technetium (3 MBq/L at the concentrations required) makes this corrosion protection impractical in almost all situations. Nevertheless, corrosion protection by pertechnetate ions was proposed (but never adopted) for use in boiling water reactors.

=== Rhenium ===
The catalytic activity of Re(bpy)(CO)_{3}Cl for carbon dioxide reduction was first studied by Lehn et al. and Meyer et al. in 1984 and 1985, respectively. Re(R-bpy)(CO)_{3}X complexes exclusively produce CO from CO_{2} reduction with Faradaic efficiencies of close to 100% even in solutions with high concentrations of water or Brønsted acids.

The catalytic mechanism of Re(R-bpy)(CO)_{3}X involves reduction of the complex twice and loss of the X ligand to generate a five-coordinate active species which binds CO_{2}. These complexes will reduce CO_{2} both with and without an additional acid present; however, the presence of an acid increases catalytic activity. The high selectivity of these complexes to CO_{2} reduction over the competing hydrogen evolution reaction has been shown by density functional theory studies to be related to the faster kinetics of CO_{2} binding compared to H^{+} binding.

=== Bohrium ===
Bohrium is a synthetic element and is too radioactive to be used in anything.

== Toxicity and precautions ==
Manganese compounds are less toxic than those of other widespread metals, such as nickel and copper. However, exposure to manganese dusts and fumes should not exceed the ceiling value of 5 mg/m^{3} even for short periods because of its toxicity level. Manganese poisoning has been linked to impaired motor skills and cognitive disorders.

Technetium has low chemical toxicity. For example, no significant change in blood formula, body and organ weights, and food consumption could be detected for rats which ingested up to 15 μg of technetium-99 per gram of food for several weeks. In the body, technetium quickly gets converted to the stable TcO^{−}_{4} ion, which is highly water-soluble and quickly excreted. The radiological toxicity of technetium (per unit of mass) is a function of compound, type of radiation for the isotope in question, and the isotope's half-life. However, it is radioactive, so all isotopes must be handled carefully. The primary hazard when working with technetium is inhalation of dust; such radioactive contamination in the lungs can pose a significant cancer risk. For most work, careful handling in a fume hood is sufficient, and a glove box is not needed.

Very little is known about the toxicity of rhenium and its compounds because they are used in very small amounts. Soluble salts, such as the rhenium halides or perrhenates, could be hazardous due to elements other than rhenium or due to rhenium itself. Only a few compounds of rhenium have been tested for their acute toxicity; two examples are potassium perrhenate and rhenium trichloride, which were injected as a solution into rats. The perrhenate had an LD_{50} value of 2800 mg/kg after seven days (this is very low toxicity, similar to that of table salt) and the rhenium trichloride showed LD_{50} of 280 mg/kg.

== Biological role ==
Of the group 7 elements, only manganese has a role in the human body. It is an essential trace nutrient, with the body containing approximately 10 milligrams at any given time. It is present as a coenzyme in biological processes that include macronutrient metabolism, bone formation, and free radical defense systems. It is a critical component in dozens of proteins and enzymes. The manganese in the human body is mainly concentrated in the bones, and the soft tissue remainder is concentrated in the liver and kidneys. In the human brain, the manganese is bound to manganese metalloproteins, most notably glutamine synthetase in astrocytes. Technetium, rhenium, and bohrium have no known biological roles. Technetium is, however, used in radioimaging.
