= Rhenium chloride =

Rhenium chloride may refer to:

- Trirhenium nonachloride (rhenium(III) chloride/Rhenium trichloride), Re_{3}Cl_{9}
- Rhenium(IV) chloride (rhenium tetrachloride), ReCl_{4}
- Rhenium pentachloride (rhenium(V) chloride), ReCl_{5}
- Rhenium(VI) chloride (rhenium hexachloride), ReCl_{6}
