= Rhenium fluoride =

Rhenium fluoride can refer to

- Rhenium(IV) fluoride (rhenium tetrafluoride, ReF_{4}), a blue crystal
- Rhenium(V) fluoride (rhenium pentafluoride, ReF_{5}), a yellow-green crystal
- Rhenium(VI) fluoride (rhenium hexafluoride, ReF_{6}), a liquid, or yellow solid
- Rhenium(VII) fluoride (rhenium heptafluoride, ReF_{7}), a liquid, or bright yellow solid
