= Organorhenium chemistry =

Organorhenium chemistry describes the compounds with Re−C bonds. Because rhenium is a rare element, relatively few applications exist, but the area has been a rich source of concepts and a few useful catalysts.

== General features ==
Rhenium exists in ten known oxidation states from −3 to +7 except −2, and all are represented by organorhenium compounds. Most are prepared from salts of perrhenate and related binary oxides. The halides, e.g., ReCl_{5} are also useful precursors as are certain oxychlorides.

A noteworthy feature of organorhenium chemistry is the coexistence of oxide and organic ligands in the same coordination sphere.

== Carbonyl compounds ==
Dirhenium decacarbonyl is a common entry point to other rhenium carbonyls. The general patterns are similar to the related manganese carbonyls. It is possible to reduce this dimer with sodium amalgam to Na[Re(CO)_{5}] with rhenium in the formal oxidation state −1. Further reduction by sodium in presence of hexamethylphosphoramide and precipitation in an ammonia solution gives Na_{3}[Re(CO)_{4}] with rhenium in the formal oxidation state −3. Bromination of dirhenium decacarbonyl gives bromopentacarbonylrhenium(I), then reduced with zinc and acetic acid to pentacarbonylhydridorhenium:

Re_{2}(CO)_{10} + Br_{2} → 2 Re(CO)_{5}Br
Re(CO)_{5}Br + Zn + HOAc → Re(CO)_{5}H + ZnBr(OAc)

Bromopentacarbonylrhenium(I) is readily decarbonylated. In refluxing water, it forms the triaquo cation:

Re(CO)_{5}Br + 3 H_{2}O → [Re(CO)_{3}(H_{2}O)_{3}]Br + 2 CO

With tetraethylammonium bromide Re(CO)_{5}Br reacts to give the anionic tribromide:

Re(CO)_{5}Br + 2 NEt_{4}Br → [NEt_{4}]_{2}[Re(CO)_{3}Br_{3}] + 2 CO

== Cyclopentadienyl complexes ==
One of the first transition metal hydride complexes to be reported was (C_{5}H_{5})_{2}ReH. A variety of half-sandwich compounds have been prepared from (C_{5}H_{5})Re(CO)_{3} and (C_{5}Me_{5})Re(CO)_{3}. Notable derivatives include the electron-precise oxide (C_{5}Me_{5})ReO_{3} and (C_{5}H_{5})_{2}Re_{2}(CO)_{4}.

== Re-alkyl and aryl compounds ==
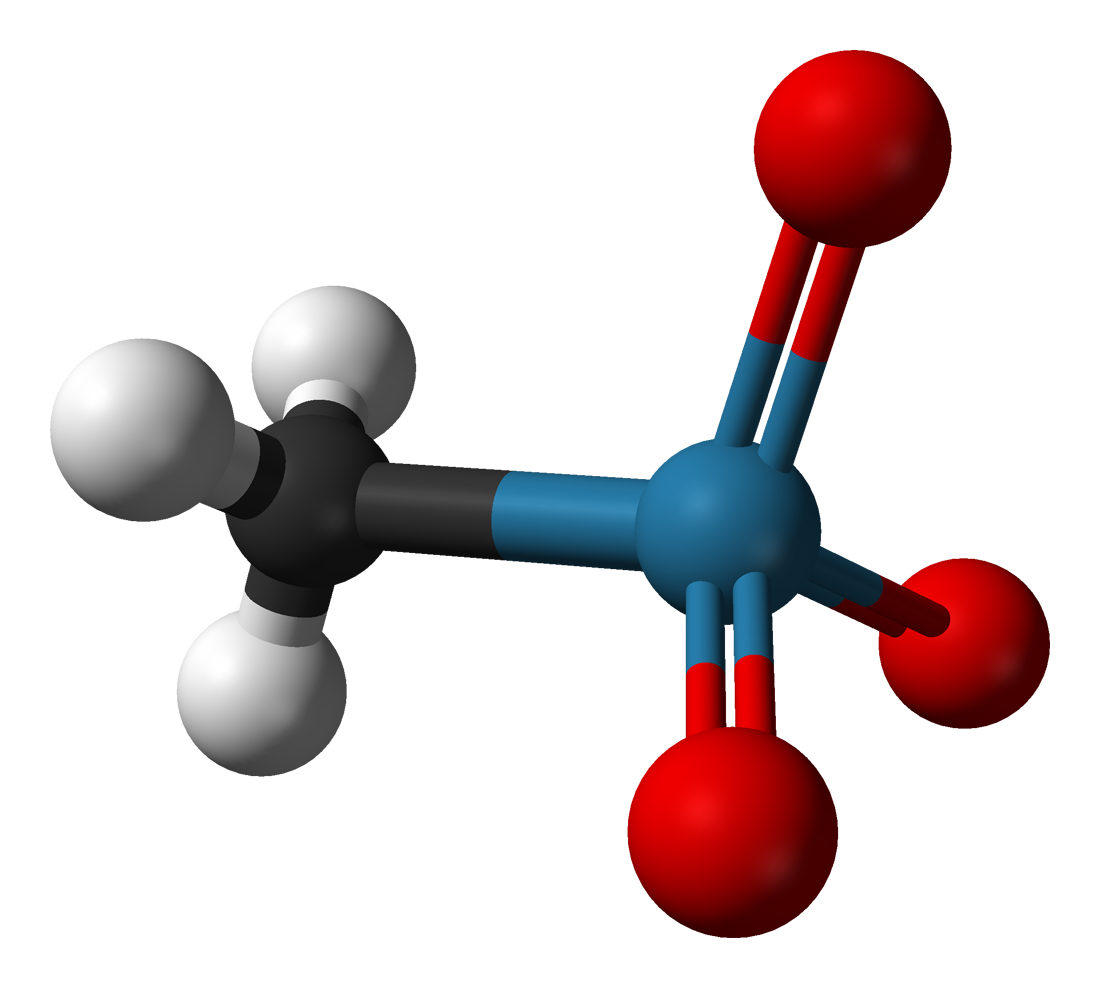
Structure of methylrhenium trioxide.

Rhenium forms a variety of alkyl and aryl derivatives, often with π-donor coligands such as oxo groups. Well known is methylrhenium trioxide ("MTO"), CH_{3}ReO_{3} a volatile, colourless solid, a rare example of a stable high-oxidation state metal alkyl complex. This compound has been used as a catalyst in some laboratory experiments. It can be prepared by many routes, a typical method is the reaction of Re_{2}O_{7} and tetramethyltin:

Re_{2}O_{7} + (CH_{3})_{4}Sn → CH_{3}ReO_{3} + (CH_{3})_{3}SnOReO_{3}

Analogous alkyl and aryl derivatives are known. Although PhReO_{3} is unstable and decomposes at –30 °C, the corresponding sterically hindered mesityl and 2,6-xylyl derivatives (MesReO_{3} and 2,6-(CH_{3})_{2}C_{6}H_{3}ReO_{3}) are stable at room temperature. The electron poor 4-trifluoromethylphenylrhenium trioxide (4-CF_{3}C_{6}H_{4}ReO_{3}) is likewise relatively stable. MTO and other organylrhenium trioxides catalyze oxidation reactions with hydrogen peroxide as well as olefin metathesis in the presence of a Lewis acid activator. Terminal alkynes yield the corresponding acid or ester, internal alkynes yield diketones, and alkenes give epoxides. MTO also catalyses the conversion of aldehydes and diazoalkanes into an alkene.

Rhenium is also able to make complexes with fullerene ligands such as Re_{2}(PMe_{3})_{4}H_{8}(η^{2}:η^{2}C_{60}).
