= Osmium fluoride =

Osmium fluoride may refer to:

- Osmium(IV) fluoride (osmium tetrafluoride), OsF_{4}
- Osmium(V) fluoride (osmium pentafluoride), OsF_{5}
- Osmium(VI) fluoride (osmium hexafluoride), OsF_{6}
- Osmium(VII) fluoride (osmium heptafluoride), OsF_{7}
- Osmium(VIII) fluoride (osmium octafluoride), OsF_{8}
