= Potassium hexafluororhenate =

Names
- IUPAC name dipotassium; hexafluoro rhenium(2-)
- Other names Potassium hexafluororhenate(IV), dipotassium hexafluororhenate

Identifiers
CAS Number	16962-12-2
3D model (JSmol)	Interactive image
- InChI: InChI=1S/6FH.2K.Re/h6*1H;;;/q;;;;;;2*+1;+4/p-6 Key: RLEITDJIBAVHKH-UHFFFAOYSA-H
- SMILES: [K+].[F-][Re+4]([F-])([F-])([F-])([F-])[F-]

Properties
Chemical formula	F_{6}K_{2}Re
Molar mass	378.394 g·mol^{−1}
Appearance	pale pink crystals
Density	4.33 g/cm^{3}

Hazards
- GHS labelling
Pictograms	(GHS07: Exclamation mark)
Signal word	Warning
- Except where otherwise noted, data are given for materials in their standard state (at 25 °C [77 °F], 100 kPa). Infobox references

Potassium hexafluororhenate is an inorganic chemical compound with the chemical formula K_{2}ReF_{6}.

== Synthesis ==
The compound can be prepared by reacting K_{2}ReI_{6} with potassium fluoride, hydrogen iodide mixture.

Also it can be formed by reacting K_{2}ReI_{6} or K_{2}ReCl_{6} with KHF_{2}.

== Physical properties ==
The compound forms pale pink crystals of the trigonal system, space group P3m1. The crystals are of K_{2}GeF_{6}-type.
