= Technetium(III) bromide =

Technetium tribromide
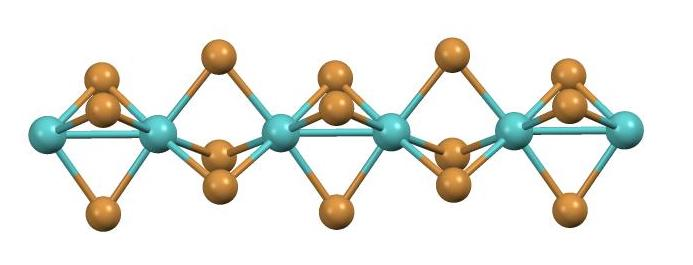

Names
- Other names Technetium(III) bromide

Identifiers
3D model (JSmol)	Interactive image
ChemSpider	25946365
- InChI: InChI=1S/3BrH.Tc/h3*1H;/q;;;+3/p-3 Key: NBIDPFWQSWZOKH-UHFFFAOYSA-K
- SMILES: [Br-].[Br-].[Br-].[Tc+3]

Properties
Chemical formula	Br_{3}Tc
Molar mass	338 g·mol^{−1}
Solubility in water	insoluble

Structure
Crystal structure	orthorhombic

Related compounds
Related compounds	Rhenium tribromide
- Except where otherwise noted, data are given for materials in their standard state (at 25 °C [77 °F], 100 kPa). Infobox references

Technetium tribromide is a binary inorganic chemical compound of technetium metal and bromine with the chemical formula TcBr_{3}.

== Synthesis ==
TcBr_{3} can be synthesized by reaction of Tc metal with elemental bromine at 400 °C.

== Physical properties ==
TcBr_{3} crystallizes in the orthorhombic space group Pmmn (a = 11.0656(2) Å, b = 5.9717(1) Å, c = 6.3870(1) Å.

Technetium tribromide is isomorphous with RuBr_{3} and MoBr_{3}.

The compound is stable in air for weeks and insoluble in common organic solvents.
