= Technetium(IV) bromide =

Names
- IUPAC name Technetium(IV) tetrabromide
- Other names: Technetium tetrabromide

Identifiers
CAS Number	74078-05-0
3D model (JSmol)	Interactive image
ChemSpider	25946366
PubChem CID	154410213
- InChI: InChI=1S/4BrH.Tc/h4*1H;/q;;;;+4/p-4 Key: GNODMDUIUYMUIB-UHFFFAOYSA-J
- SMILES: Br[Tc](Br)(Br)Br

Properties
Chemical formula	TcBr_{4}
Molar mass	416.52 g/mol
Appearance	Black or brown solid
Density	4.888 g/cm^{3}
Solubility in water	Soluble

Structure
Crystal structure	Orthorhombic

Related compounds
Other cations	Technetium chloride
Related	Manganese(II) bromide
- Except where otherwise noted, data are given for materials in their standard state (at 25 °C [77 °F], 100 kPa). Infobox references

Technetium(IV) bromide is an inorganic compound with the formula TcBr_{4}. A brown solid, it is moderately soluble in water.

== Preparation ==
Technetium tetrabromide is produced by combining the elements at elevated temperatures:

Tc + 2 Br_{2} → TcBr_{4}

== Structure ==
As verified by X-ray crystallography, the compound is an inorganic polymer consisting of interconnected TcBr_{6} octahedra. Platinum(IV) bromide and osmium(IV) bromide adopt similar structures.
