= Rhenium tetrafluoride =

Names
- Other names Rhenium(IV) fluoride

Identifiers
CAS Number	149852-31-3
3D model (JSmol)	Interactive image
ChemSpider	57568799
PubChem CID	18469520
CompTox Dashboard (EPA)	20594153
- InChI: InChI=1S/4FH.Re/h4*1H;/p-4 Key: IZVAOCKUNBYXSU-UHFFFAOYSA-J
- SMILES: [F-].[F-].[F-].[F-].[Re]

Properties
Chemical formula	F_{4}Re
Molar mass	262.201 g·mol^{−1}
Appearance	blue crystals
Density	5.38 g/cm^{3}
Melting point	124.5 °C (256.1 °F; 397.6 K)
Boiling point	795 °C (1,463 °F; 1,068 K)

Structure
Crystal structure	tetragonal

Related compounds
Related compounds	Osmium tetrafluoride
- Except where otherwise noted, data are given for materials in their standard state (at 25 °C [77 °F], 100 kPa). Infobox references

Rhenium tetrafluoride is a binary inorganic compound of rhenium and fluorine with the chemical formula ReF_{4}.

== Synthesis ==
Rhenium tetrafluoride can be made by the reduction of rhenium hexafluoride with hydrogen, rhenium, or sulfur dioxide:

ReF_{6} + H_{2} → 2ReF_{4} + 2HF

2ReF_{6} + Re → 3ReF_{4}

ReF_{6} + SO_{2} → ReF_{4} + SO_{2}F_{2}

== Physical properties ==
Rhenium tetrafluoride forms blue crystals of tetragonal structure, cell parameters a = 1.012 nm, c = 1.595 nm.

Rhenium tetrafluoride reacts with water, and corrodes glass when heated.
