= Rhenium(III) bromide =

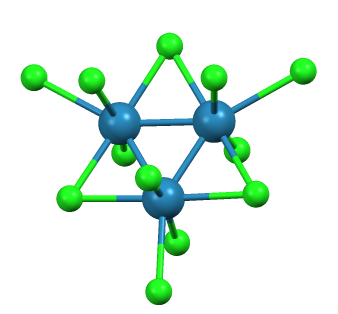

Names
- Other names: Trirhenium nonabromide; Rhenium tribromide

Identifiers
CAS Number	13569-49-8
3D model (JSmol)	Interactive image
ChemSpider	15750935
ECHA InfoCard	100.033.607
EC Number	236-984-5
PubChem CID	83579
CompTox Dashboard (EPA)	DTXSID8065535
- InChI: InChI=1S/3BrH.Re/h3*1H;/q;;;+3/p-3
- SMILES: Br[Re](Br)Br

Properties
Chemical formula	Re_{3}Br_{9}
Molar mass	425.92 g/mol
Appearance	Black lustrous solid
Melting point	500 °C (932 °F; 773 K) (sublimes)
Solubility in water	Reacts
Solubility	Sparingly soluble in ether and acetone, reacts with methanol and ammonia

Structure
Molecular shape	Trimeric

Thermochemistry
Std enthalpy of formation (Δ_{f}H^{⦵}_{298})	−164.4 kJ/mol

Related compounds
Other anions	Rhenium(III) chloride
- Except where otherwise noted, data are given for materials in their standard state (at 25 °C [77 °F], 100 kPa). Infobox references

Rhenium(III) bromide is a chemical compound with the formula Re_{3}Br_{9}. It is a black lustrous crystalline solid. This compound reacts with water to form rhenium(IV) oxide and is isostructural with rhenium(III) chloride.

== Preparation ==
This compound is prepared by the reaction of rhenium metal and bromine gas at 500 °C under nitrogen:

6Re + 9Br_{2} → 2Re_{3}Br_{9}

If there is oxygen in the atmosphere, it will instead form rhenium(III) oxybromide.

However, the most common method of producing this compound is by first reacting potassium hexabromorhenate(IV) with silver nitrate, which forms silver hexabromorhenite(IV), then this compound is heated to 600 °C to form rhenium(III) bromide.

K_{2}ReBr_{6} + 2AgNO_{3} → Ag_{2}ReBr_{6} + 2KNO_{3}
6Ag_{2}ReBr_{6} → 12AgBr + 3Br_{2} + 2Re_{3}Br_{9}

An alternative method is a thermal decomposition of rhenium(V) bromide.
