= Potassium hexachlororhenate =

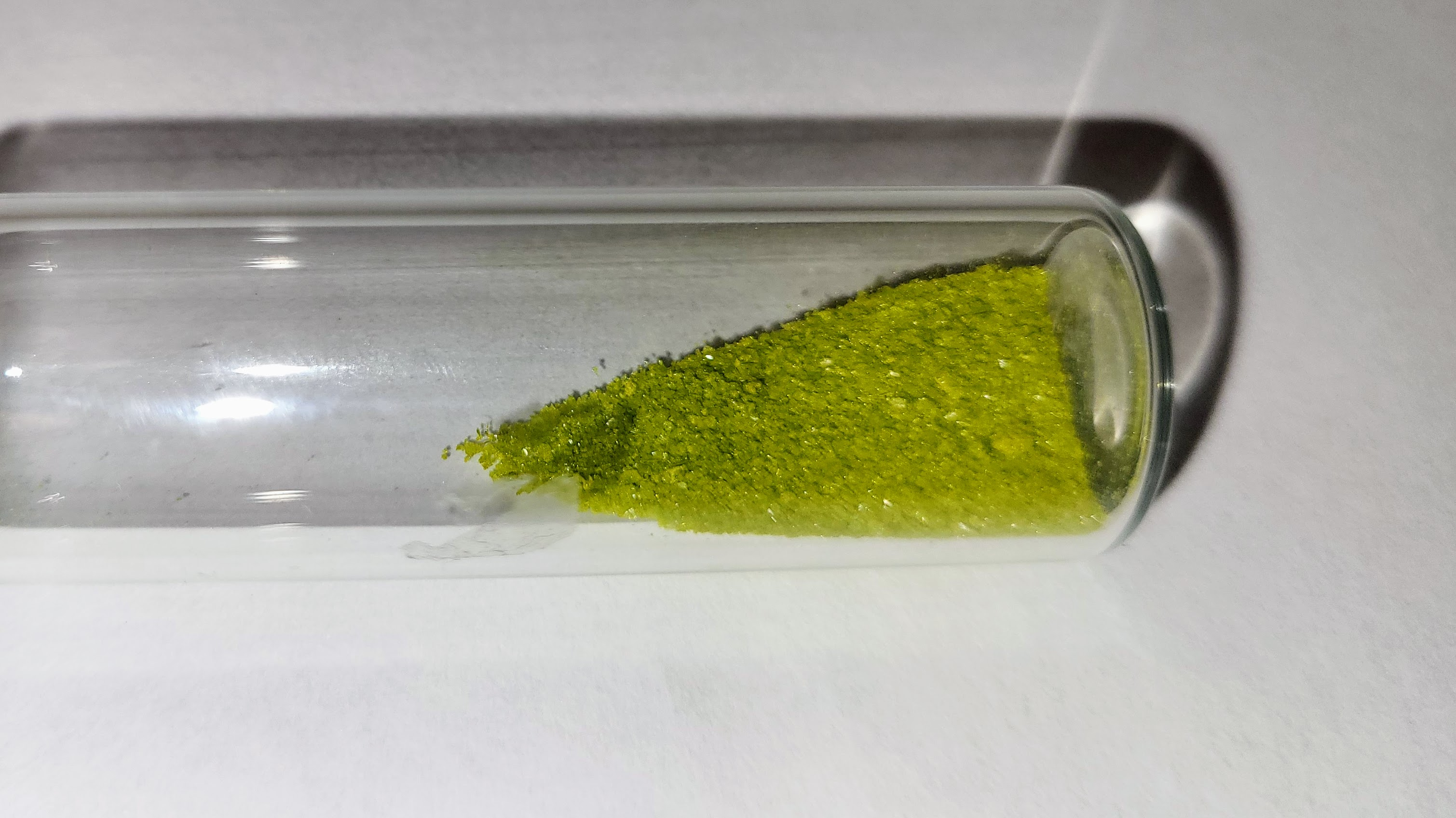

Names
- Other names: Potassium chlororhenite; Potassium hexachlororhenate(IV)

Identifiers
CAS Number	16940-97-9
3D model (JSmol)	Interactive image
ChemSpider	9114955
ECHA InfoCard	100.037.265
EC Number	241-008-6
PubChem CID	10939720
- InChI: InChI=1S/6ClH.2K.Re/h6*1H;;;/q;;;;;;2*+1;+4/p-6 Key: HGCRXIXEXSEJGV-UHFFFAOYSA-H
- SMILES: Cl[Re-2](Cl)(Cl)(Cl)(Cl)Cl.[K+].[K+]

Properties
Chemical formula	K_{2}ReCl_{6}
Molar mass	477.12 g/mol
Appearance	Light green solid
Density	3.31 g/cm^{3}
Solubility in water	Soluble, slowly hydrolyses
Solubility	Soluble in hydrochloric acid

Structure
Crystal structure	cubic
Space group	Fm3m
Lattice constant	a = 9.84 Å α = 90°, β = 90°, γ = 90°
Lattice volume (V)	953 Å^{3}

Thermochemistry
Heat capacity (C)	214.8 J/(K·mol)
Std molar entropy (S^{⦵}_{298})	372.0 J/(K·mol)

Hazards
- GHS labelling
Pictograms	(GHS05: Corrosive)
Signal word	Danger
Safety data sheet (SDS)	Sigma-Aldrich
- Except where otherwise noted, data are given for materials in their standard state (at 25 °C [77 °F], 100 kPa). Infobox references

Potassium hexachlororhenate, also known as potassium chlororhenite, is an inorganic chemical compound with the formula K_{2}ReCl_{6}. It is a light-green crystalline solid soluble in hydrochloric acid.

== Production and reactions ==
Potassium hexachlororhenate is most commonly prepared by the reduction of potassium perrhenate with potassium iodide, hypophosphorous acid, or chromium(II) chloride in the presence of hydrochloric acid.

It reacts with silver nitrate to produce silver hexachlororhenate, which in turn decomposes at 400 °C to rhenium(III) chloride.

In water, it hydrolyses to form rhenium(IV) oxide.
