= Technetium chloride =

There are three technetium chlorides:

- Technetium(II) chloride
- Technetium(III) chloride, a black solid
- Technetium(IV) chloride, a red solid
