= Osmium(V) chloride =

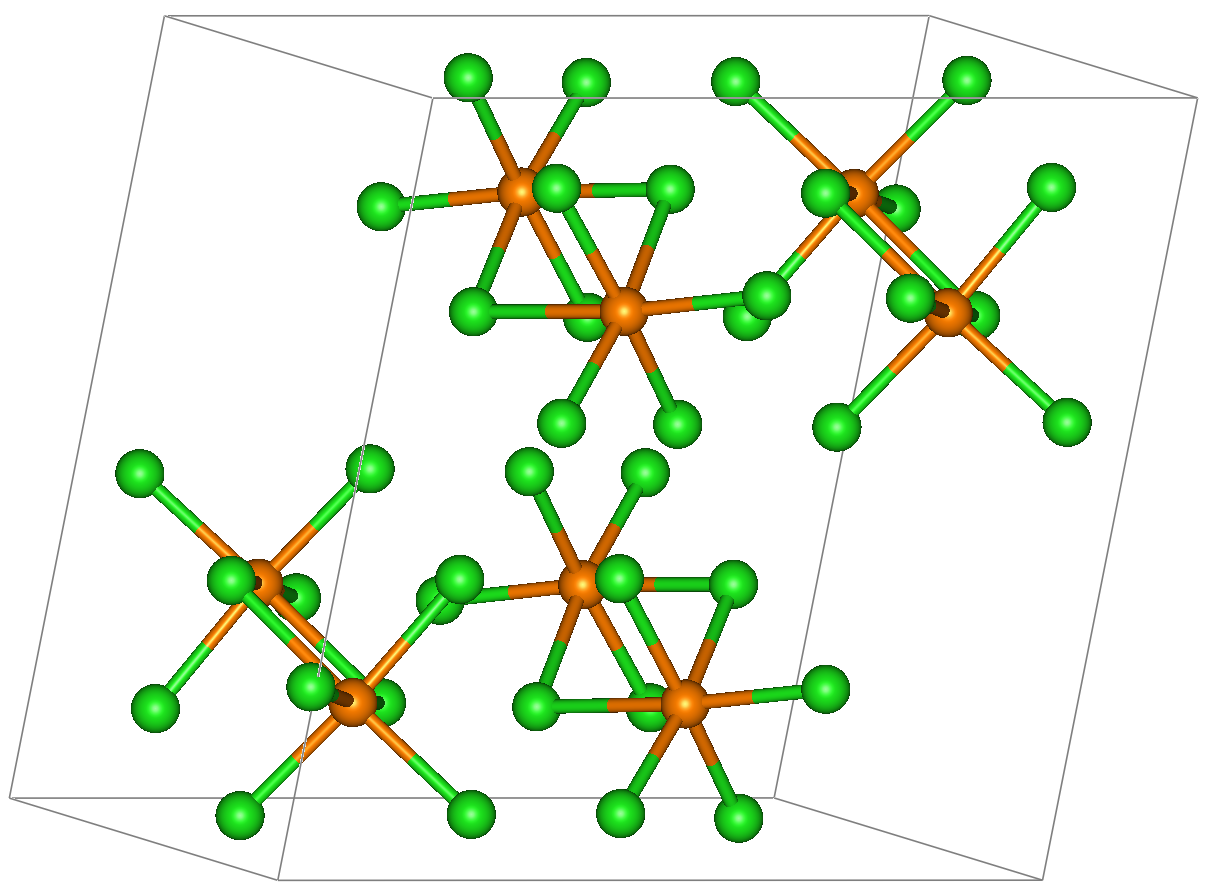

Names
- Other names pentachloroosmium, osmium pentachloride

Identifiers
CAS Number	71328-74-0
3D model (JSmol)	Interactive image
ChemSpider	4423016
PubChem CID	5257384
- InChI: InChI=1S/5ClH.Os/h5*1H;/q;;;;;+5/p-5 Key: UVOYHLXSTOWTCX-UHFFFAOYSA-I
- SMILES: Cl[Os](Cl)(Cl)(Cl)Cl

Properties
Chemical formula	Cl_{5}Os
Molar mass	367.48 g·mol^{−1}
Appearance	black solid
Density	4.09
Melting point	160 °C (320 °F; 433 K)
Solubility in water	soluble

Structure
Space group	P2_{1}/c
Lattice constant	a = 9.17 Å, b = 11.5 Å, c = 11.97 Å α = 90°, β = 109°°, γ = 90°.
Lattice volume (V)	1194 Å^{3}
Formula units (Z)	8

Related compounds
Related compounds	Osmium pentafluoride; Rhenium pentachloride
- Except where otherwise noted, data are given for materials in their standard state (at 25 °C [77 °F], 100 kPa). Infobox references

Osmium(V) chloride is an inorganic chemical compound of osmium metal and chlorine with the chemical formula OsCl_{5}.

== Potential synthesis ==
Osmium(V) chloride can be obtained in small amounts by reacting osmium hexafluoride with excess boron trichloride:

2OsF_{6} + 4BCl_{3} → 2OsCl_{5} + 4BF_{3} + Cl_{2}

It can also be obtained by the action of sulfur dichloride on osmium tetroxide:

2OsO_{4} + 8SCl_{2} + 5Cl_{2} → 2OsCl_{5} + 8SOCl_{2}

== Physical properties ==
Osmium(V) chloride forms a black dimeric solid, isomorphic with rhenium(V) chloride. OsCl_{5} is sparingly soluble in non-polar solvents. It is soluble in POCl_{3} to form a red-brown solution, which can crystallize OsCl_{5}·POCl_{3}.
