= Osmium heptafluoride =

Names
- Other names Osmium(VII) fluoride

Identifiers
CAS Number	16949-69-2
3D model (JSmol)	Interactive image
PubChem CID	57418910
- InChI: InChI=1S/7FH.Os/h7*1H;/q;;;;;;;+7/p-7 Key: PYLQBEQBIUJFFB-UHFFFAOYSA-G
- SMILES: F[Os](F)(F)(F)(F)(F)F

Properties
Chemical formula	F_{7}Os
Molar mass	323.22 g·mol^{−1}

Structure
Crystal structure	Pentagonal bipiramidal (calculated)

Related compounds
Related compounds	Rhenium heptafluoride
- Except where otherwise noted, data are given for materials in their standard state (at 25 °C [77 °F], 100 kPa). Infobox references

Osmium heptafluoride is a possible inorganic chemical compound of osmium metal and fluorine with the chemical formula OsF_{7}. It was first reported in 1966 by the reaction of fluorine and osmium at 600 °C and 400 atm, but no purported synthesis could be reproduced in 2006, giving only osmium hexafluoride instead.

== Physical properties ==
If it exists, osmium(VII) fluoride is supposedly a bluish-yellow hygroscopic substance, extremely unstable. The compound starts decomposing at –100 °C. It should be stored in a nickel vessel at the temperature of liquid nitrogen.

== Chemical properties ==
Osmium heptafluoride decomposes to osmium hexafluoride when slightly heated:

2OsF_{7} → 2OsF_{6} + F_{2}
