= Rhenium pentachloride =

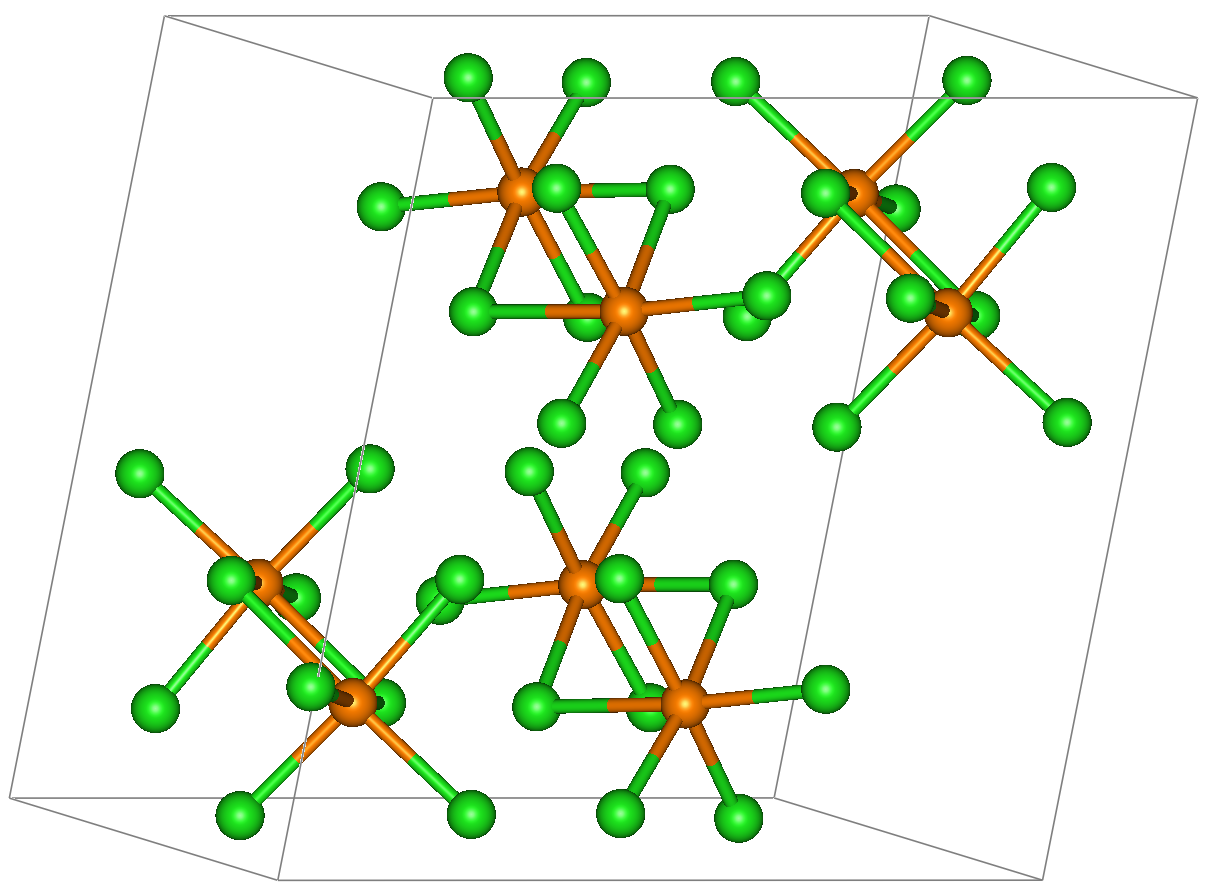

Names
- IUPAC name Rhenium pentachloride
- Other names Rhenium(V) chloride, Rhenium chloride, pentachlororhenium

Identifiers
CAS Number	13596-35-5
3D model (JSmol)	monomer: Interactive image; dimer: Interactive image
ChemSpider	75428
ECHA InfoCard	100.033.660
EC Number	237-042-6
PubChem CID	83602
CompTox Dashboard (EPA)	DTXSID1065552
- InChI: InChI=1S/5ClH.Re/h5*1H;/q;;;;;+5/p-5 Key: XZQYTGKSBZGQMO-UHFFFAOYSA-I; InChI=1/5ClH.Re/h5*1H;/q;;;;;+5/p-5/rCl5Re/c1-6(2,3,4)5 Key: XZQYTGKSBZGQMO-PXGBCINVAP
- SMILES: monomer: Cl[Re](Cl)(Cl)(Cl)Cl; dimer: Cl[Re-]1(Cl)(Cl)(Cl)[Cl+][Re-]([Cl+]1)(Cl)(Cl)(Cl)Cl

Properties
Chemical formula	ReCl_{5}
Molar mass	363.471 g/mol
Appearance	red-brown
Density	4.9 g/cm^{3}, solid
Melting point	220 °C (428 °F; 493 K)
Boiling point	N/A
Solubility in water	Will react to decompose and release HCl (g)
Magnetic susceptibility (χ)	+1225.0·10^{−6} cm^{3}/mol

Structure
Crystal structure	Monoclinic, mP48; a = 0.924 nm, b = 1.154 nm, c = 1.203 nm, α = 90°, β = 109.1°, γ = 90°
Space group	P2_{1}/c, No. 14
Molecular shape	Octahedral

Hazards
- Occupational safety and health (OHS/OSH)
Main hazards	releases HCl upon hydrolysis
- GHS labelling
Pictograms	(GHS07: Exclamation mark)
Signal word	Warning
Hazard statements	H315, H319, H335
Precautionary statements	P261, P264, P271, P280, P302+P352, P304+P340, P305+P351+P338, P312, P321, P332+P313, P337+P313, P362, P403+P233, P405, P501
NFPA 704 (fire diamond)	1 0 W
Safety data sheet (SDS)	MSDS

Related compounds
Other anions	Rhenium pentafluoride
Other cations	Osmium pentachloride
Related Rhenium chlorides	Trirhenium nonachloride; Rhenium tetrachloride; Rhenium hexachloride
- Except where otherwise noted, data are given for materials in their standard state (at 25 °C [77 °F], 100 kPa). verify (what is ?) Infobox references

Rhenium pentachloride is an inorganic compound with the formula Re_{2}Cl_{10}. This red-brown solid is paramagnetic.

== Structure and preparation ==
Rhenium pentachloride has a bioctahedral structure and can be described as Cl_{4}Re(μ-Cl)_{2}ReCl_{4}. The (μ-Cl)_{2} part of this formula indicates that two chloride ligands are bridging ligands, i.e. they connect to two Re atoms. The Re-Re distance is 3.74 Å. The motif is similar to that seen for tantalum pentachloride.

This compound was first prepared in 1933, a few years after the discovery of rhenium. The preparation involves chlorination of rhenium at temperatures up to 900 °C. The material can be purified by sublimation.

ReCl_{5} is one of the most oxidized binary chlorides of Re. It does not undergo further chlorination. ReCl_{6} has been prepared from rhenium hexafluoride. Rhenium heptafluoride is known but not the heptachloride.

== Uses and reactions ==
It degrades in air to a brown liquid.

Although rhenium pentachloride has no commercial applications, it is of historic significance as one of the early catalysts for olefin metathesis. Reduction gives trirhenium nonachloride.

Oxygenation affords the Re(VII) oxychloride:

ReCl_{5} + 3 Cl_{2}O → ReO_{3}Cl + 5 Cl_{2}

Comproportionation of the penta- and trichloride gives rhenium tetrachloride.
