= Technetium(III) chloride =

Names
- Other names Technetium(III) chloride

Identifiers
CAS Number	1255775-02-0
3D model (JSmol)	Interactive image
ChemSpider	26946114
- InChI: InChI=1S/3ClH.Tc/h3*1H;/q;;;+3/p-3 Key: XAEYUXPVCBLTEP-UHFFFAOYSA-K
- SMILES: [Cl-].[Cl-].[Cl-].[Tc+3]

Properties
Chemical formula	Cl_{3}Tc
Molar mass	204 g·mol^{−1}
Appearance	black solid
- Except where otherwise noted, data are given for materials in their standard state (at 25 °C [77 °F], 100 kPa). Infobox references

Chemical structure of technetium(III) chloride

Technetium trichloride is an inorganic compound of technetium and chlorine with the formula TcCl_{3}.

== Preparation and properties ==
Two polymorphs of technetium trichloride are known. The α-polymorph is prepared as a black solid from ditechnetium(III) tetraacetate dichloride and hydrogen chloride at 300 °C. It has a bioctahedral structure, consisting of triangular Tc_{3}Cl_{9} units with C_{3v} symmetry, with each Tc atom coordinated to two Tc neighbors and five chloride ligands (Tc-Tc bond length 2.44 angstrom). The Tc-Tc distances are indicative of double bonded Tc atoms. Tc_{3}Cl_{9} is isostructural to its rhenium homologue, trirhenium nonachloride.

β-TcCl_{3} is obtained by the reaction between technetium metal and chlorine gas. Its structure consists of infinite layers of edge-sharing octahedra, similar to MoCl_{3} and ReCl_{3}, with distances that also indicate metal-metal bonding. It is less stable than α-TcCl_{3} and slowly transforms into it.
