= Potassium hexabromorhenate =

Names
- IUPAC name dipotassium; hexabromo rhenium(2-)
- Other names Potassium hexabromorhenate(IV)

Identifiers
CAS Number	16903-70-1
3D model (JSmol)	Interactive image
ChemSpider	4907648
PubChem CID	71310035
- InChI: InChI=1S/6BrH.2K.Re/h6*1H;;;/q;;;;;;2*+1;+4/p-6 Key: KJFJGUZKEHEZCT-UHFFFAOYSA-H
- SMILES: [K+].[K+].Br[Re-2](Br)(Br)(Br)(Br)Br

Properties
Chemical formula	Br_{6}K_{2}Re
Molar mass	743.828 g·mol^{−1}
Appearance	dark red crystals
Density	4.34 g/cm^{3}
Solubility in water	reacts with water

Hazards
- GHS labelling
Signal word	Warning
- Except where otherwise noted, data are given for materials in their standard state (at 25 °C [77 °F], 100 kPa). Infobox references

Potassium hexabromorhenate is an inorganic chemical compound with the chemical formula K_{2}ReBr_{6}.

== Synthesis ==
Fusion of rhenium with potassium bromide in a bromine vapor current:

Re + 2KBr + 2Br_{2} → K_{2}ReBr_{6}

The effect of hydrobromic acid on a mixture of potassium bromide with rhenium(IV) oxide:

ReO_{2} + 2KBr + 4HBr → K_{2}ReBr_{6} + 2H_{2}O

Reduction of potassium perrenate by potassium iodide in concentrated hydrobromic acid:

2KReO_{4} + 6KI + 16HBr → 2K_{2}ReBr_{6} + 4KBr + 3I_{2} + 8H_{2}O

== Chemical properties ==
Potassium hexabromorhenate dissolves in hydrobromic acid to create a red or deep yellow solution.

Reacts with water.

K_{2}ReBr_{6} + 2H_{2}O → ReO_{2} + 2KBr + 4HBr

== Physical properties ==
The compound forms dark red crystals of cubic system, space group Fm3m.
