= Rhenium(VI) chloride =

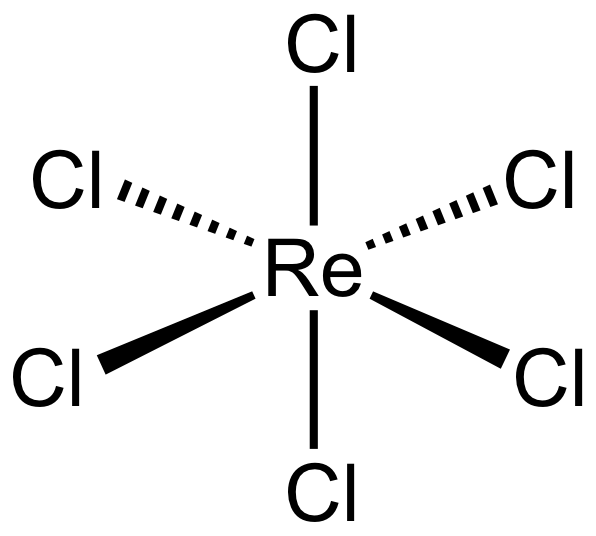

Names
- Other names rhenium hexachloride

Identifiers
CAS Number	31234-26-1
3D model (JSmol)	Interactive image
ChemSpider	4321528
PubChem CID	5148054
CompTox Dashboard (EPA)	DTXSID601291531
- InChI: InChI=1S/6ClH.Re/h6*1H;/q;;;;;;+6/p-6 Key: GSGIQJBJGSKCDZ-UHFFFAOYSA-H
- SMILES: Cl[Re](Cl)(Cl)(Cl)(Cl)Cl

Properties
Chemical formula	Cl_{6}Re
Molar mass	398.91 g·mol^{−1}
Appearance	black solid
- Except where otherwise noted, data are given for materials in their standard state (at 25 °C [77 °F], 100 kPa). Infobox references

Rhenium(VI) chloride is the inorganic compound with the formula ReCl_{6}. It is a black paramagnetic solid. The molecules adopt an octahedral structure as seen in tungsten(VI) chloride.

== Preparation and reactions ==
Rhenium(VI) chloride was first generated as a mixture by chlorination of Re films. Bulk samples can be prepared by combining rhenium hexafluoride with excess boron trichloride:

2 ReF_{6} + 6 BCl_{3} → ReCl_{6} + 6 BF_{2}Cl

It is unstable at room temperature with respect to rhenium(V) chloride:

2 ReCl_{6} → [ReCl_{5}]_{2} + Cl_{2}
