= Potassium hexaiodorhenate =

Names
- IUPAC name dipotassium; hexaiodo rhenium(2-)
- Other names Potassium hexaiodorhenate(IV), dipotassium hexaiodorhenate

Identifiers
CAS Number	19710-22-6
3D model (JSmol)	Interactive image
ChemSpider	17344846
EC Number	621-412-2
PubChem CID	16217292
CompTox Dashboard (EPA)	DTXSID70584322
- InChI: InChI=1S/6HI.2K.Re/h6*1H;;;/q;;;;;;2*+1;+4/p-6 Key: DFWHBRZEYYLAED-UHFFFAOYSA-H
- SMILES: [K+].[K+].I[Re--](I)(I)(I)(I)I

Properties
Chemical formula	I_{6}K_{2}Re
Molar mass	1025.830 g·mol^{−1}
Appearance	black crystals
Density	g/cm^{3}
Solubility in water	reacts with water

Hazards
- GHS labelling
Pictograms	(GHS05: Corrosive)
Signal word	Danger
Hazard statements	H314
Precautionary statements	P260, P264, P280, P301+P330+P331, P302+P361+P354, P304+P340, P305+P354+P338, P316, P321, P363, P405, P501
- Except where otherwise noted, data are given for materials in their standard state (at 25 °C [77 °F], 100 kPa). Infobox references

Potassium hexaiodorhenate is an inorganic chemical compound with the chemical formula K_{2}ReI_{6}.

== Synthesis ==
The compound can be prepared by reduction of potassium perrhenate by potassium iodide in concentrated hydrochloric acid:

2KReO_{4} + 2KI + 16HI → 2KReI_{6} + 3I_{2} + 8H_{2}O

== Physical properties ==
The compound forms black crystals, soluble in warm HI, methanol, and acetone.

== Chemical properties ==
Potassium hexaiodorhenate is hydrolyzed in aqueous solutions.

K_{2}ReI_{6} + 2H_{2}O → ReO_{2} + 2KI + 4HI

It decomposes when heated:

K_{2}ReI_{6} → Re + 2KI + 2I_{2}

It reacts with strong acids:

K_{2}ReI_{6} + H_{2}SO_{4} → HReI_{5} + HI + K_{2}SO_{4}
