= Pentacarbonylhydridorhenium =

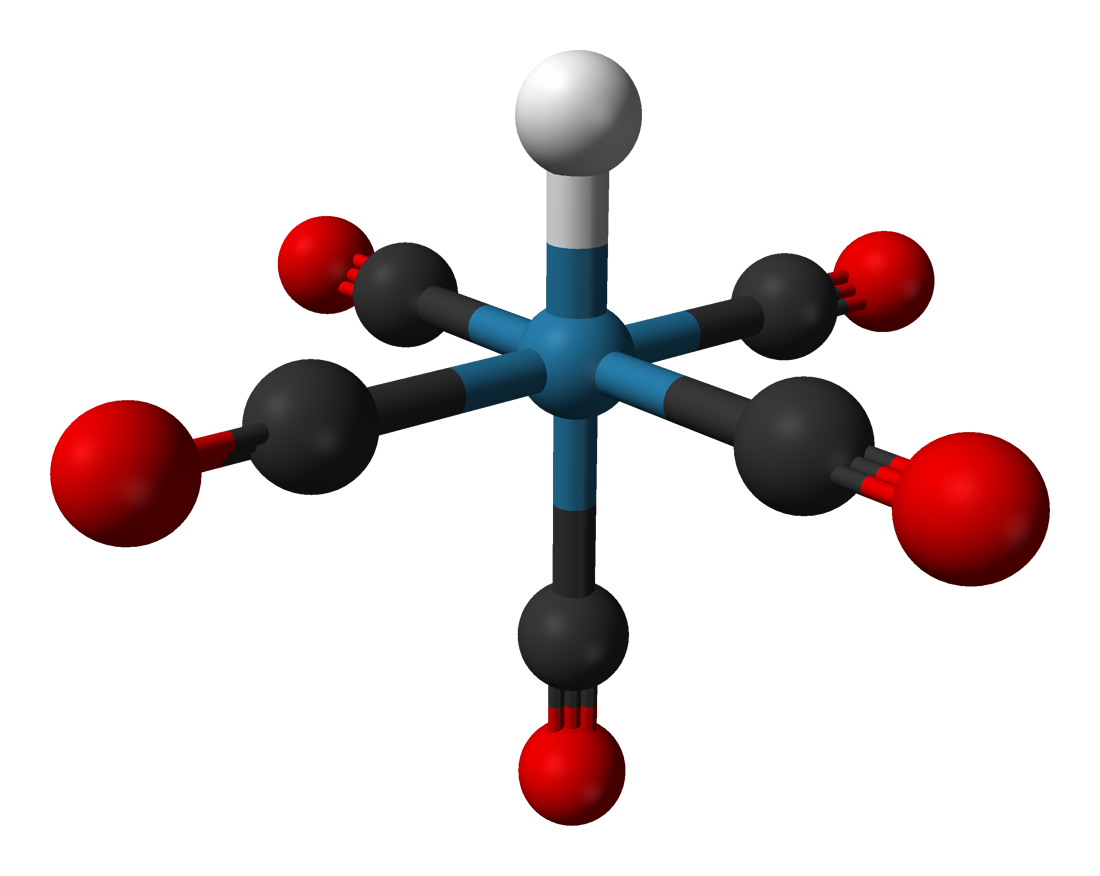

Names
- IUPAC name pentacarbonylhydridorhenium

Identifiers
CAS Number	16457-30-0
3D model (JSmol)	Interactive image
PubChem CID	139031000
- InChI: InChI=1S/5CO.Re.H/c5*1-2;; Key: CNPMTNYPOCHKNC-UHFFFAOYSA-N; InChI=1/5CO.Re.H/c5*1-2;;/rC5HO5Re/c6-1-11(2-7,3-8,4-9)5-10/h11H Key: CNPMTNYPOCHKNC-AUQHHBNCAA
- SMILES: C(#O)[ReH](C#O)(C#O)(C#O)C#O

Properties
Chemical formula	ReH(CO)_{5}
Molar mass	327.265 g/mol
Appearance	Colorless liquid
Density	2.30 g/mL, liquid
Melting point	12.5 °C (54.5 °F; 285.6 K)
Boiling point	100 °C (212 °F; 373 K) (decomposes)
Solubility in water	Insoluble

Hazards
- Occupational safety and health (OHS/OSH)
Main hazards	Flammable
- Except where otherwise noted, data are given for materials in their standard state (at 25 °C [77 °F], 100 kPa). verify (what is ?) Infobox references

Pentacarbonylhydridorhenium is a chemical compound with the formula ReH(CO)_{5}. This colorless liquid is a weak acid and represents one of the most important derivatives of dirhenium decacarbonyl (Re_{2}(CO)_{10}). It is synthesized by treating a methanolic solution of bromopentacarbonylrhenium(I) (Re(CO)_{5}Br) with zinc and acetic acid (HOAc).

Re(CO)_{5}Br + Zn + HOAc → ReH(CO)_{5} + ZnBrOAc

It is moderately sensitive to light: samples turn yellow due to the formation of the metal cluster Re_{3}H(CO)_{14}

3 Re(CO)_{5}H → Re_{3}H(CO)_{14} + H_{2} + CO

At 100 °C, it decomposes to Re_{2}(CO)_{10}:

2 Re(CO)_{5}H → H_{2} + Re_{2}(CO)_{10}
