= Osmium(IV) fluoride =

Names
- Other names Osmium tetrafluoride

Identifiers
CAS Number	54120-05-7
3D model (JSmol)	Interactive image
PubChem CID	101946458
- InChI: InChI=CSRXPKRQTCTNOE-UHFFFAOYSA-J Key: 1S/4FH.Os/h4*1H;/q;;;;+4/p-4
- SMILES: [F-].[F-].[F-].[F-].[Os+4]

Properties
Chemical formula	F_{4}Os
Molar mass	266.22 g·mol^{−1}
Appearance	yellow crystals
Melting point	230 °C (446 °F; 503 K)
Solubility in water	reacts with water
- Except where otherwise noted, data are given for materials in their standard state (at 25 °C [77 °F], 100 kPa). Infobox references

Osmium(IV) fluoride is an inorganic chemical compound of osmium metal and fluorine with the chemical formula OsF_{4}.

== Synthesis ==
Passing fluorine over heated osmium at 280 °C:

Os + 2F_{2} → OsF_{4}

Reaction products can be contaminated with other osmium fluorides.

== Physical properties ==
Osmium(IV) fluoride compound forms yellow hygroscopic crystals.

== Chemical properties ==
Osmium(IV) fluoride reacts with water.

OsF_{4} + 2H_{2}O → OsO_{2} + 4HF
