= Bromopentacarbonylrhenium(I) =

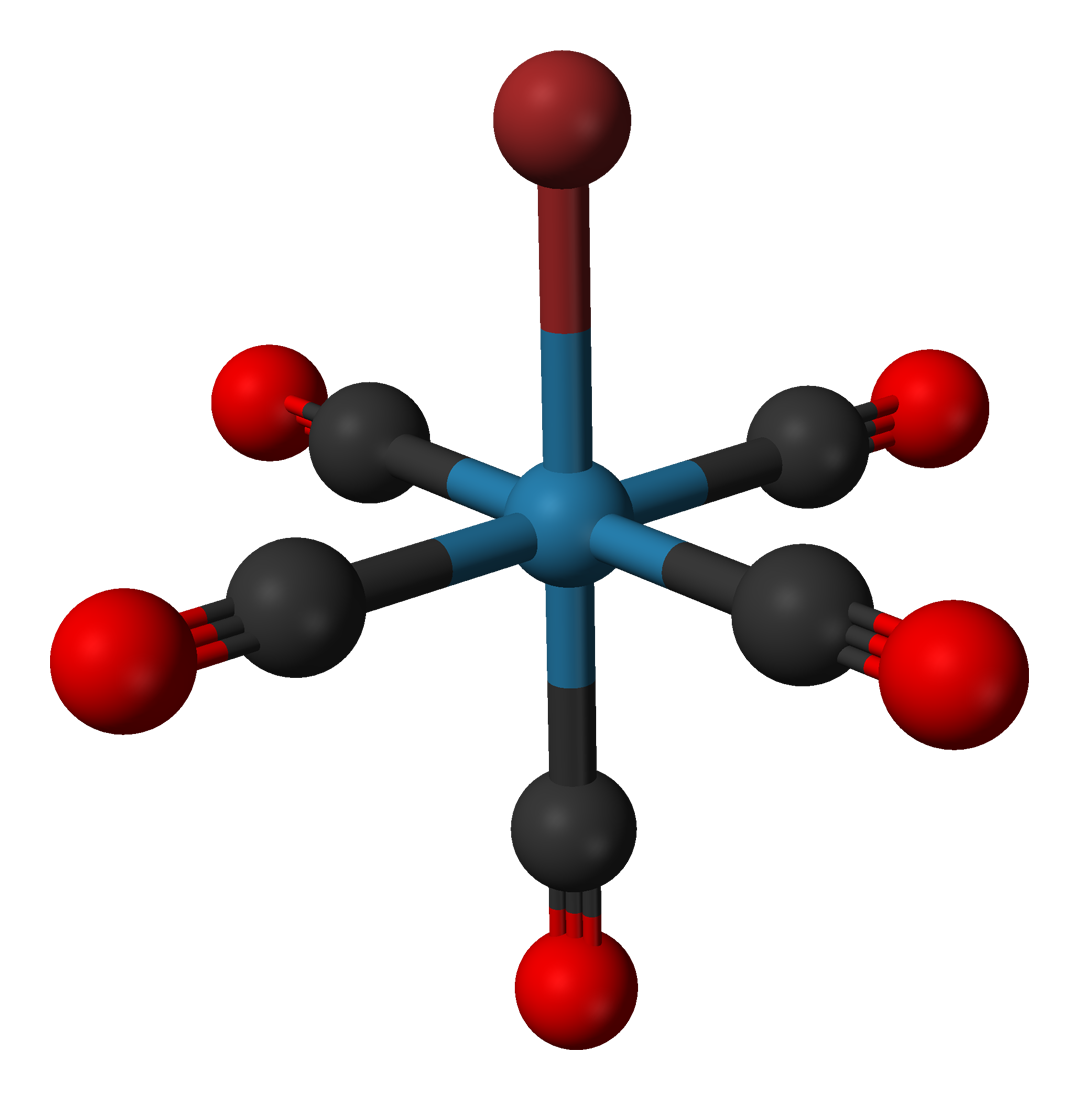

Names
- IUPAC name Bromidopentacarbonylrhenium

Identifiers
CAS Number	14220-21-4
3D model (JSmol)	Interactive image
ChemSpider	21171161
ECHA InfoCard	100.034.607
EC Number	238-084-8
PubChem CID	6096983
CompTox Dashboard (EPA)	DTXSID30161971
- InChI: InChI=1S/5CO.BrH.Re/c5*1-2;;/h;;;;;1H;/q;;;;;;+1/p-1 Key: NWJBOTGGBYFKEJ-UHFFFAOYSA-M
- SMILES: [C-]#[O+].[C-]#[O+].[C-]#[O+].[C-]#[O+].[C-]#[O+].Br[Re]

Properties
Chemical formula	Re(CO)_{5}Br
Molar mass	406.16 g/mol
Appearance	colorless
Melting point	sublimes 85-90 °C (0.2 mm Hg)
Solubility in chlorocarbons	soluble

Hazards
- GHS labelling
Pictograms	(GHS06: Toxic) (GHS07: Exclamation mark)
Signal word	Danger
Hazard statements	H301, H311, H315, H319, H331, H335
Precautionary statements	P261, P264, P270, P271, P280, P301+P310, P302+P352, P304+P340, P305+P351+P338, P311, P312, P321, P322, P330, P332+P313, P337+P313, P361, P362, P363, P403+P233, P405, P501
- Except where otherwise noted, data are given for materials in their standard state (at 25 °C [77 °F], 100 kPa). verify (what is ?) Infobox references

Bromopentacarbonylrhenium(I) is an inorganic compound of rhenium, commonly used for the syntheses of other rhenium complexes.

== Preparation ==
Bromopentacarbonylrhenium(I) is commercially available. It is also easily and inexpensively synthesized by the oxidation of dirhenium decacarbonyl with bromine:

Re_{2}(CO)_{10} + Br_{2} → 2 ReBr(CO)_{5}

It was first prepared by the "reductive carbonylation" of rhenium(III) bromide:

ReBr_{3} + 2 Cu + 5 CO → BrRe(CO)_{5} + 2 CuBr

Copper(I) bromide is a byproduct.

== Reactions ==
Bromopentacarbonylrhenium(I) is a precursor to other rhenium complexes. It reacts with zinc and acetic acid to give pentacarbonylhydridorhenium (HRe(CO)_{5}).

Re(CO)_{5}Br + Zn + HO_{2}CCH_{3} → ReH(CO)_{5} + ZnBrO_{2}CCH_{3}

It also reacts with tetraethylammonium bromide in diglyme to give [NEt_{4}]_{2}[ReBr_{3}(CO)_{3})], an important precursor to compounds containing the rhenium tricarbonyl fragment.

Heating bromopentacarbonylrhenium(I) in water give the triaquo complex:

ReBr(CO)_{5} + 3 H_{2}O → [Re(H_{2}O)_{3}(CO)_{3}]Br + 2 CO

This route avoids the formation of the tetraethylammonium bromide byproduct, which is often difficult to remove from reaction mixtures.
