= Rhenium(IV) chloride =

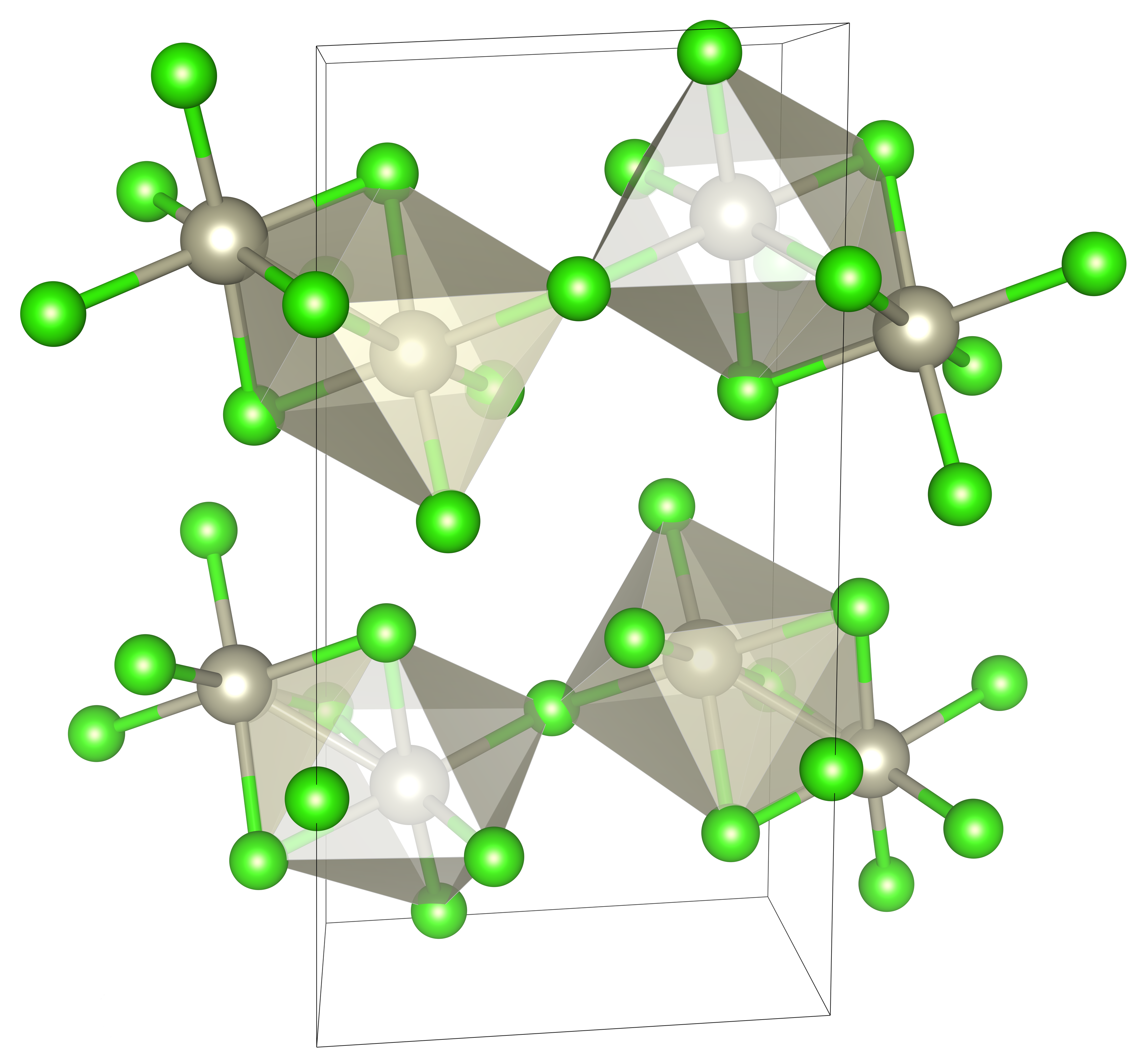
- Unit cell of Rhenium(IV) chloride.

Names
- Other names rhenium tetrachloride

Identifiers
CAS Number	13569-71-6
3D model (JSmol)	Interactive image
ChemSpider	75414
ECHA InfoCard	100.033.612
PubChem CID	83584
CompTox Dashboard (EPA)	DTXSID7065540
- InChI: InChI=1S/4Cl.Re Key: YPYBYMCXDNTAKJ-UHFFFAOYSA-N
- SMILES: [Cl-].[Cl-].[Cl-].[Cl-].[Re+4]

Properties
Chemical formula	Cl_{4}Re
Molar mass	328.01 g·mol^{−1}
Appearance	black solid
Density	4.5 g·cm^{−3} (β)

Structure
Crystal structure	Primitive monoclinic
Space group	P2/c, No. 13
Lattice constant	a = 636.2 pm, b = 627.3 pm, c = 1216.5 pm α = 90°, β = 93.15°, γ = 90°
Formula units (Z)	4
- Except where otherwise noted, data are given for materials in their standard state (at 25 °C [77 °F], 100 kPa). Infobox references

Rhenium(IV) chloride is the inorganic compound with the formula ReCl_{4}. This black solid is of interest as a binary phase but otherwise is of little practical value. A second polymorph of ReCl_{4} is also known.

== Preparation ==
ReCl_{4} can be prepared by comproportionation of rhenium(V) chloride and rhenium(III) chloride. It can also be produced by reduction of rhenium(V) chloride with antimony trichloride.

$$\mathrm{2 \ ReCl_5 + SbCl_3 \longrightarrow 2 \ ReCl_4 + SbCl_5}$$

Tetrachloroethylene at 120 °C is also effective as a reductant:

$$\mathrm{2 \ ReCl_5 + C_2Cl_4 \longrightarrow 2 \ ReCl_4 + C_2Cl_6}$$

== Structure ==
X-ray crystallography reveals a polymeric structure. The Re–Re bonding distance is 2.728 Å. Re centers are octahedral, being surrounded by six chloride ligands. Pairs of octahedra share faces. The Re_{2}Cl_{9} subunits are linked by bridging chloride ligands. The structural motif - corner-shared bioctahedra - is unusual in the binary metal halides.
