= Rhenium hexafluoride =

Names
- IUPAC name rhenium(VI) fluoride
- Other names rhenium hexafluoride

Identifiers
CAS Number	10049-17-9
3D model (JSmol)	Interactive image
ChemSpider	59616
ECHA InfoCard	100.030.144
EC Number	233-172-2
PubChem CID	66231
UNII	U1FW6E300T
CompTox Dashboard (EPA)	DTXSID8064931
- InChI: InChI=1S/6FH.Re/h6*1H;/q;;;;;;+6/p-6
- SMILES: F[Re](F)(F)(F)(F)F

Properties
Chemical formula	F_{6}Re
Molar mass	300.20 g/mol
Appearance	liquid, or yellow crystalline solid
Density	4.94g/mL
Melting point	18.5 °C (65.3 °F; 291.6 K)
Boiling point	33.7 °C (92.7 °F; 306.8 K)
- Except where otherwise noted, data are given for materials in their standard state (at 25 °C [77 °F], 100 kPa). Infobox references

Rhenium hexafluoride, also rhenium(VI) fluoride, (ReF_{6}) is a compound of rhenium and fluorine and one of the seventeen known binary hexafluorides.

== Chemistry ==
Rhenium hexafluoride is made by combining rhenium heptafluoride with additional rhenium metal at 300 °C in a pressure vessel.

6 ReF_{7} + Re → 7 ReF_{6}

The compound is a Lewis acid and strong oxidant, adducting potassium fluoride and oxidizing nitric oxide to nitrosyl:

2KF + ReF_{6} → K_{2}ReF_{8}
NO + ReF_{6} → [NO][ReF_{6}]

== Description ==
Rhenium hexafluoride is a liquid at room temperature. At 18.5 °C, it freezes into a yellow solid. The boiling point is 33.7 °C.

The solid structure measured at −140 °C is orthorhombic space group Pnma. Lattice parameters are a = 9.417 Å, b = 8.570 Å, and c = 4.965 Å. There are four formula units (in this case, discrete molecules) per unit cell, giving a density of 4.94 g·cm^{−3}.

The ReF_{6} molecule itself (the form important for the liquid or gas phase) has octahedral molecular geometry, which has point group (O_{h}). The Re–F bond length is 1.823 Å.

== Use ==
Rhenium hexafluoride is a commercial material used in the electronics industry for depositing films of rhenium.
