= Rhenium heptafluoride =

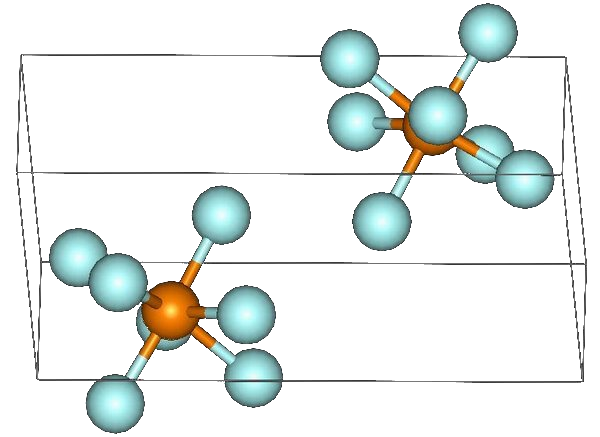

Names
- IUPAC name rhenium heptafluoride, heptafluoridorhenium

Identifiers
CAS Number	17029-21-9
3D model (JSmol)	Interactive image
ChemSpider	26323924
PubChem CID	123369
UNII	H54U6B0W52
CompTox Dashboard (EPA)	DTXSID50168826
- InChI: InChI=1S/7FH.Re/h7*1H;/q;;;;;;;+7/p-7 Key: HFHBKXWKPQUYIA-UHFFFAOYSA-G; InChI=1/7FH.Re/h7*1H;/q;;;;;;;+7/p-7/rF7Re/c1-8(2,3,4,5,6)7 Key: HFHBKXWKPQUYIA-KLJGHBABAK
- SMILES: F[Re](F)(F)(F)(F)(F)F

Properties
Chemical formula	ReF_{7}
Molar mass	319.196 g/mol
Appearance	Bright yellow crystalline solid
Density	4.3 g/cm^{3}
Melting point	48.3 °C (118.9 °F; 321.4 K)
Boiling point	73.72 °C (164.70 °F; 346.87 K)
Solubility in water	Reacts
Vapor pressure	13.41 kPa

Structure
Crystal structure	triclinic, aP16
Space group	P1̅ (No. 2)

Thermochemistry
Enthalpy of fusion (Δ_{f}H^{⦵}_{fus})	7.53 kJ/mol
Enthalpy of vaporization (Δ_{f}H_{vap})	30.77 kJ/mol

Related compounds
Related compounds	Osmium heptafluoride
- Except where otherwise noted, data are given for materials in their standard state (at 25 °C [77 °F], 100 kPa). verify (what is ?) Infobox references

Rhenium heptafluoride is the compound with the formula ReF_{7}. It is a yellow low melting solid and is the only thermally stable metal heptafluoride. It has a distorted pentagonal bipyramidal structure similar to IF_{7}, which was confirmed by neutron diffraction at 1.5 K. The structure is non-rigid, as evidenced by electron diffraction studies.

== Production, reactions and properties ==
Rhenium heptafluoride can be prepared from the elements at 400 °C:

2 Re + 7 F_{2} → 2 ReF_{7}

It also can be produced by the explosion of rhenium metal under sulfur hexafluoride.

It hydrolyzes under a base to form perrhenic acid and hydrogen fluoride:

ReF_{7} + 4H_{2}O → HReO_{4} + 7HF

With fluoride donors such as CsF, the ReF^{−}_{8} anion is formed, which has a square antiprismatic structure. With antimony pentafluoride, SbF_{5}, a fluoride acceptor, the ReF^{+}_{6} cation is formed.
