= Trirhenium nonachloride =

Names
- IUPAC name Rhenium(III) chloride
- Other names Rhenium trichloride

Identifiers
CAS Number	13569-63-6
3D model (JSmol)	ReCl_{3}: Interactive image; Re_{3}Cl_{9}: Interactive image
ChemSpider	15623874; Re_{3}Cl_{9}: 123348
ECHA InfoCard	100.033.610
EC Number	236-987-1
PubChem CID	83581
CompTox Dashboard (EPA)	DTXSID8065537
- InChI: Key: LOIHSHVELSAXQN-UHFFFAOYSA-K; InChI=1S/3ClH.Re/h3*1H;/q;;;+3/p-3
- SMILES: ReCl_{3}: Cl[Re](Cl)Cl; Re_{3}Cl_{9}: Cl[Re-]12(Cl)([Cl+]3)[Re-]3(Cl)(Cl)([Cl+]4)[Re-]14(Cl)(Cl)([Cl+]2)

Properties
Chemical formula	ReCl_{3}
Molar mass	292.57 g/mol
Appearance	red, crystalline, nonvolatile solid
Density	4800 kg/m^{3}
Melting point	N/A
Boiling point	500 °C (932 °F; 773 K) (decomposes)
Solubility in water	hydrolyzes to form Re_{2}O_{3}^{.}xH_{2}O.

Structure
Crystal structure	Rhombohedral, hR72
Space group	R-3m, No. 166
Molecular shape	(trimeric solid and in solution) (dimeric in acetic acid)

Hazards
- Occupational safety and health (OHS/OSH)
Main hazards	Corrosive (C)
Safety data sheet (SDS)	External MSDS

Related compounds
Other anions	Rhenium tribromide Rhenium triiodide
- Except where otherwise noted, data are given for materials in their standard state (at 25 °C [77 °F], 100 kPa). verify (what is ?) Infobox references

Trirhenium nonachloride is a compound with the formula ReCl_{3}, sometimes also written Re_{3}Cl_{9}. It is a dark red hygroscopic solid that is insoluble in ordinary solvents. The compound is important in the history of inorganic chemistry as an early example of a cluster compound with metal-metal bonds. It is used as a starting material for synthesis of other rhenium complexes.

== Structure and physical properties ==
As shown by X-ray crystallography trirhenium nonachloride consists of Re_{3}Cl_{12} subunits that share three chloride bridges with adjacent clusters. The interconnected network of clusters forms sheets. Around each Re center are seven ligands, four bridging chlorides, one terminal chloride, and two Re-Re bonds.

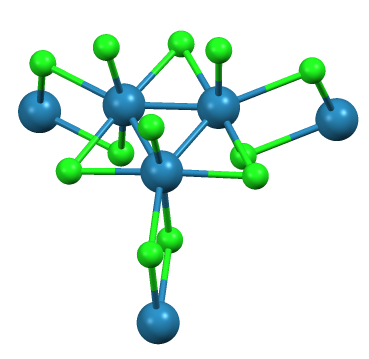
Re_{3}Cl_{12} cluster within ReCl_{3}, shown with full coordination sphere around each chloride.

The hydrate is molecular with the formula Re_{3}Cl_{9}(H_{2}O)_{3}.

The heat of oxidation is evaluated according to the equation:

1/3 Re_{3}Cl_{9} + 4 OH^{−} + 2 OCl^{−} → ReO_{4}^{−} + 2 H_{2}O + 5Cl^{−}

The enthalpy for this process is 190.7 ± 0.2 kcal/mol.

== Preparation and reactions ==
The compound was discovered in 1932. Trirhenium nonachloride is efficiently prepared by thermal decomposition of rhenium pentachloride or hexachlororhenic(IV) acid:

3 ReCl_{5} → Re_{3}Cl_{9} + 3 Cl_{2}

If the sample is vacuum sublimed at 500 °C, the resulting material is comparatively unreactive. The partially hydrated material such as Re_{3}Cl_{9}(H_{2}O)_{4} can be more useful synthetically. Other synthetic methods include treating rhenium with sulfuryl chloride. This process is sometimes conducted with the addition of aluminium chloride. It is also obtained by heating Re_{2}(O_{2}CCH_{3})_{4}Cl_{2} under HCl:

3/2 Re_{2}(O_{2}CCH_{3})_{4}Cl_{2} + 6 HCl → Re_{3}Cl_{9} + 6 HO_{2}CCH_{3}

Reaction of the tri- and pentachlorides gives rhenium tetrachloride:

3 ReCl_{5} + Re_{3}Cl_{9} → 6 ReCl_{4}
