= Chromium compounds =

Chemical compounds containing chromium

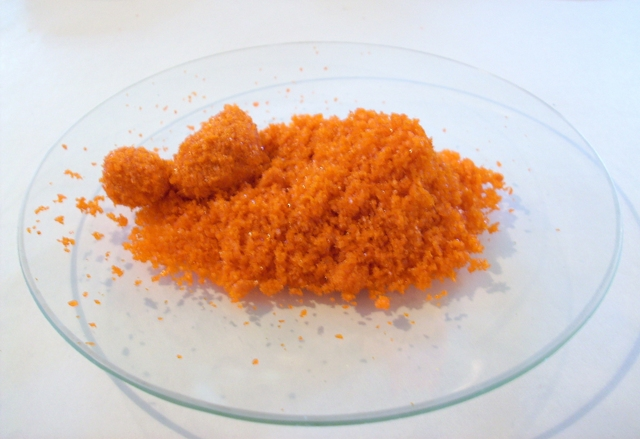
A sample of sodium dichromate, a compound of chromium

Chromium compounds are compounds containing the element chromium (Cr). Chromium is a member of group 6 of the transition metals. The +3 and +6 states occur most commonly within chromium compounds, followed by +2; charges of +1, +4 and +5 for chromium are rare, but do nevertheless occasionally exist.

== Common oxidation states ==
Oxidation states (Note: Most common oxidation states of chromium are in bold. The right column lists a representative compound for each oxidation state.)
−4 (d^{10})	Na_{4}[Cr(CO)_{4}]
−2 (d^{8})	Na_{2}[Cr(CO)_{5}]
−1 (d^{7})	Na_{2}[Cr_{2}(CO)_{10}]
0 (d^{6})	Cr(C_{6}H_{6})_{2}
+1 (d^{5})	K_{3}[Cr(CN)_{5}NO]
+2 (d^{4})	CrCl_{2}
+3 (d^{3})	CrCl_{3}
+4 (d^{2})	K_{2}CrF_{6}
+5 (d^{1})	K_{3}Cr(O_{2})_{4}
+6 (d^{0})	K_{2}CrO_{4}

=== Chromium(0) ===
Many Cr(0) complexes are known. Bis(benzene)chromium and chromium hexacarbonyl are highlights in organochromium chemistry.

=== Chromium(II) ===
Chromium(II) compounds are uncommon, in part because they readily oxidize to chromium(III) derivatives in air. Water-stable chromium(II) chloride CrCl_{2} that can be made by reducing chromium(III) chloride with zinc. The resulting bright blue solution created from dissolving chromium(II) chloride is stable at neutral pH. Some other notable chromium(II) compounds include chromium(II) oxide CrO, and chromium(II) sulfate CrSO_{4}. Many chromium(II) carboxylates are known. The red chromium(II) acetate (Cr_{2}(O_{2}CCH_{3})_{4}) is somewhat famous. It features a Cr-Cr quadruple bond.

=== Chromium(III) ===
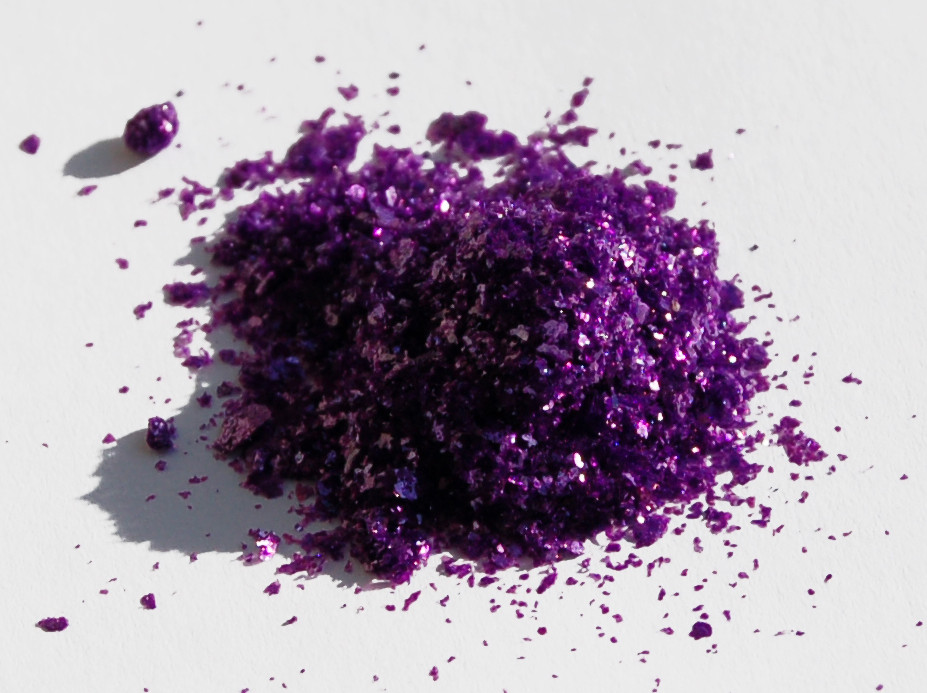
Anhydrous chromium(III) chloride (CrCl_{3})

A large number of chromium(III) compounds are known, such as chromium(III) nitrate, chromium(III) acetate, and chromium(III) oxide. The ion has been described as "forming complexes with virtually any species capable of donating an electron pair" and tends to form octahedral complexes. The Cr^{3+} ion has a similar radius (63 pm) to Al^{3+} (radius 50 pm), and they can replace each other in some compounds, such as in chrome alum and alum.

Chromium(III) complexes are kinetically inert, exchanging ligands on hour-long timescales (unless catalyzed by trace quantities of Cr^{2+}). Consequently a given elemental formula for a salt often has multiple coordination isomers, and metathesis to a desired compound may be nontrivial. Efficient syntheses rely on redox: chromium(III) can be obtained through chromium(VI) reduction, elemental chromium dissolution in hydrochloric acid or sulfuric acid, or oxidation of a chromium(II) starting material.

Commercially available chromium(III) chloride hydrate is the dark green complex [CrCl_{2}(H_{2}O)_{4}]Cl. Closely related compounds are the pale green [CrCl(H_{2}O)_{5}]Cl_{2} and violet [Cr(H_{2}O)_{5}]Cl_{3}. If anhydrous violet chromium(III) chloride is dissolved in water, the violet solution turns green after some time as the chloride in the inner coordination sphere is replaced by water. This kind of reaction is also observed with solutions of chrome alum and other water-soluble chromium(III) salts. A tetrahedral coordination of chromium(III) has been reported for the Cr-centered Keggin anion [α-CrW_{12}O_{40}]^{5–}.

Chromium(III) hydroxide (Cr(OH)_{3}) is amphoteric, dissolving in acidic solutions to form [Cr(H_{2}O)_{6}]^{3+}, and in basic solutions to form [Cr(OH)_{4}(H_{2}O)_{2}]^{−}. It is dehydrated by heating to form the green chromium(III) oxide (Cr_{2}O_{3}), a stable oxide with a crystal structure identical to that of corundum.

=== Chromium(VI) ===
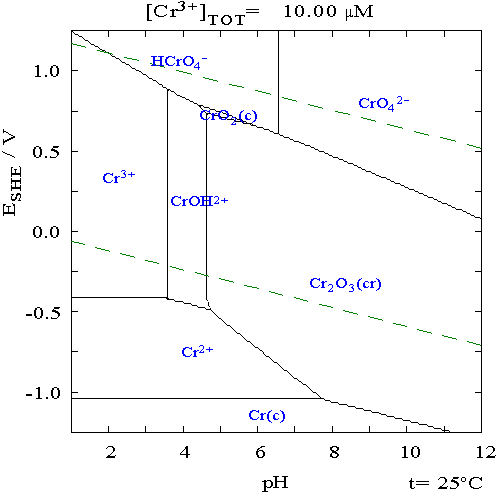
The Pourbaix diagram for chromium in pure water, perchloric acid, or sodium hydroxide

Chromium(VI) compounds are oxidants at low or neutral pH. Chromate anions (CrO^{2−}_{4}) and dichromate (Cr_{2}O_{7}^{2−}) anions are the principal ions at this oxidation state. They exist at an equilibrium, determined by pH:

2 [CrO_{4}]^{2−} + 2 H^{+} ⇌ [Cr_{2}O_{7}]^{2−} + H_{2}O

Chromium(VI) oxyhalides are known also and include chromyl fluoride (CrO_{2}F_{2}) and chromyl chloride (CrO_{2}Cl_{2}). However, despite several erroneous claims, chromium hexafluoride (as well as all higher hexahalides) remains unknown, as of 2020.

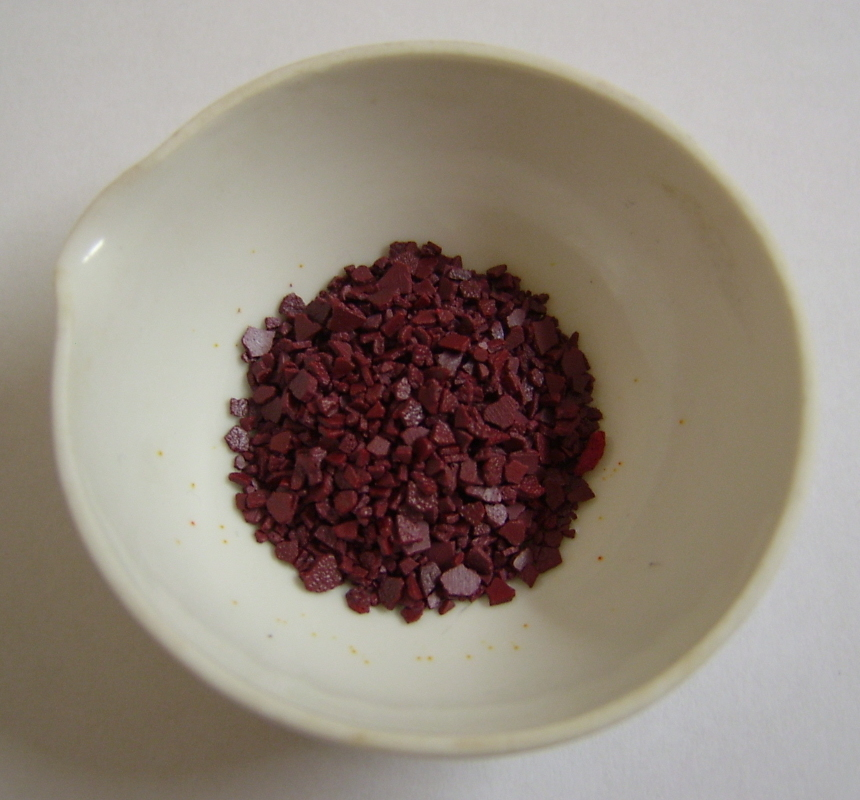
Chromium(VI) oxide

Sodium chromate is produced industrially by the oxidative roasting of chromite ore with sodium carbonate. The change in equilibrium is visible by a change from yellow (chromate) to orange (dichromate), such as when an acid is added to a neutral solution of potassium chromate. At yet lower pH values, further condensation to more complex oxyanions of chromium is possible.

Both the chromate and dichromate anions are strong oxidizing reagents at low pH:

Cr_{2}O^{2−}_{7} + 14 H_{3}O^{+} + 6 e^{−} → 2 Cr^{3+} + 21 H_{2}O (ε_{0} = 1.33 V)

They are, however, only moderately oxidizing at high pH:

CrO^{2−}_{4} + 4 H_{2}O + 3 e^{−} → Cr(OH)_{3} + 5 OH^{−} (ε_{0} = −0.13 V)

Chromium(VI) compounds in solution can be detected by adding an acidic hydrogen peroxide solution. The unstable dark blue chromium(VI) peroxide (CrO_{5}) is formed, which can be stabilized as an ether adduct CrO_{5}·OR_{2}.

Chromic acid has the hypothetical formula H_{2}CrO_{4}. It is a vaguely described chemical, despite many well-defined chromates and dichromates being known. The dark red chromium(VI) oxide CrO_{3}, the acid anhydride of chromic acid, is sold industrially as "chromic acid". It can be produced by mixing sulfuric acid with dichromate and is a strong oxidizing agent.

== Other oxidation states ==
Compounds of chromium(V) are rather rare; the oxidation state +5 is only realized in few compounds but are intermediates in many reactions involving oxidations by chromate. The only binary compound is the volatile chromium(V) fluoride (CrF_{5}). This red solid has a melting point of 30 °C and a boiling point of 117 °C. It can be prepared by treating chromium metal with fluorine at 400 °C and 200 bar pressure.

The peroxochromate(V) is another example of the +5 oxidation state. Potassium peroxochromate (K_{3}[Cr(O_{2})_{4}]) is made by reacting potassium chromate with hydrogen peroxide at low temperatures. This red brown compound is stable at room temperature but decomposes spontaneously at 150–170 °C.

Unusually, tertiary hydroxyacids reduce sodium chromate(VI) to chromyl(V) carboxylates, e.g.:

Na_{2}Cr_{2}O_{7} + 5 C_{2}H_{5}(CH_{3})C(OH)COOH → 2 Na[OCr(O_{2}COC(CH_{3})C_{2}H_{5})_{2}] + C_{2}H_{5}COCH_{3} + CO_{2} + 5 H_{2}O

Compounds of chromium(IV) are slightly more common than those of chromium(V). The tetrahalides, CrF_{4}, CrCl_{4}, and CrBr_{4}, can be produced by treating the trihalides (CrX_{3}) with the corresponding halogen at elevated temperatures. Such compounds are susceptible to disproportionation reactions and are not stable in water. Organic compounds containing Cr(IV) state such as chromium tetra t-butoxide are also known.

Most chromium(I) compounds are obtained solely by oxidation of electron-rich, octahedral chromium(0) complexes. Other chromium(I) complexes contain cyclopentadienyl ligands. As verified by X-ray diffraction, a Cr-Cr quintuple bond (length 183.51(4) pm) has also been described. Extremely bulky monodentate ligands stabilize this compound by shielding the quintuple bond from further reactions.

== See also ==
- Chromium
- Cobalt compounds
