= Chromium fluoride =

Chromium fluoride may refer to:

- Chromium(II) fluoride, a blue-green iridescent solid
- Chromium(III) fluoride, a green crystalline solid
- Chromium(IV) fluoride, a dark greenish-black color when solid
- Chromium(V) fluoride, a red volatile solid
- Chromium(VI) fluoride, a hypothetical chemical compound
