= Chromium bromide =

Chromium bromide may refer to:

- Chromium(II) bromide (chromium dibromide), CrBr_{2}
- Chromium(III) bromide (chromium tribromide), CrBr_{3}
- Chromium(IV) bromide (chromium tetrabromide), CrBr_{4}
