= Stahl oxidation =

Chemical reaction

Named after	Shannon S. Stahl
Reaction type	Organic redox reaction

The Stahl oxidation is a copper-catalyzed aerobic oxidation of primary and secondary alcohols to aldehydes and ketones. Known for its high selectivity and mild reaction conditions, the Stahl oxidation offers several advantages over classical alcohol oxidations.

Key features of the Stahl oxidation are the use of a 2,2'-bipyridyl-ligated copper(I) species in the presence of a nitroxyl radical and N-methyl imidazole in polar aprotic solvent, most commonly acetonitrile or acetone. Copper(I) sources can vary, though sources with non-coordinating anions like triflate, tetrafluoroborate, and hexafluorophosphate are preferred, with copper(I) bromide and copper(I) iodide salts demonstrating utility in select applications. Frequently, tetrakis(acetonitrile)copper(I) salts are used. For most applications, reactions can be run at room temperature and ambient air contains sufficiently high enough oxygen concentrations to be used as the terminal oxidant. Compared to chromium-, DMSO-, or periodinane-mediated oxidations, this proves safe, environmentally-friendly, practical, and highly economical.

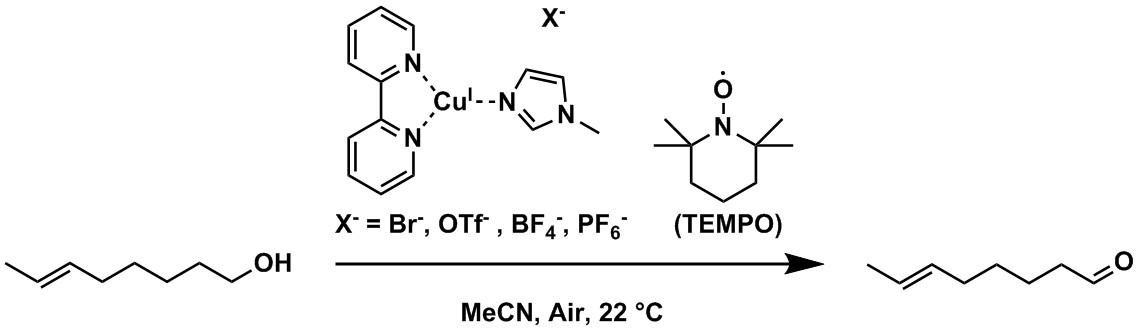
Model substrate used in Hoover & Stahl's seminal work. Under these conditions, >98% yields were observed by gas chromatography.

In general, the Stahl oxidation is selective for oxidizing primary alcohols over secondary alcohols (both aliphatic and benzylic), and favors the oxidation of primary benzylic alcohols over primary aliphatic alcohols when TEMPO is used as the nitroxyl radical. This is in contrast to the Oppenauer oxidation, which favors the oxidation of secondary alcohols over primary and several other specialty oxidations. Over-oxidation of primary alcohols to carboxylic acids is rare, though lactones can form in certain diol-containing substrates. The use of less hindered nitroxyl radicals like ABNO or AZADO allow for the oxidation of both primary and secondary alcohols.

== History ==
In 2011, Jessica Hoover and Shannon Stahl disclosed improved conditions for selective oxidation of primary alcohols to aldehydes using a (bpy)copper(I)/TEMPO system. While several catalytic aerobic oxidation systems were known at the time, many utilized palladium, which can be prohibitive through its expense and its cross-reactivity with alkene-bearing substrates. Aerobic oxidative catalysis of alcohols by copper, though known since at least 1984, was generally lower performing, requiring some combination of elevated reaction temperatures, higher catalyst loading, handling of pure oxygen, and biphasic or otherwise non-common solvent systems.

Following the success of this initial disclosure, Hoover and Stahl went on to publish a further simplified protocol for rapid benzylic alcohol oxidation with Nicolas Hill, director of undergraduate organic chemistry laboratories at the University of Wisconsin - Madison. Utilizing a less expensive solvent and copper source, Hill, Hoover, and Stahl demonstrated that higher catalyst loadings could be economically achieved. In doing so, the oxidation of alcohols could be accelerated for use as a practical educational tool in undergraduate labs. Furthermore, reaction completion is typically indicated by a change in solution color for red/brown to green resulting from a change in the copper species' resting state. This is unique for benzylic and other activated alcohols, as the rate-limiting-step for these substrates is catalyst re-oxidation, which differs from aliphatic alcohols where the rate limiting step is C-H cleavage. The Stahl oxidation is a component of the undergraduate organic chemistry laboratory curriculum at UW-Madison and the University of Utah.

In 2013, the mechanism for the copper(I)/TEMPO oxidation of alcohols was elucidated, and it was found the use of less hindered nitroxyl radical sources allowed for the oxidation of secondary alcohols.

== Modifications ==
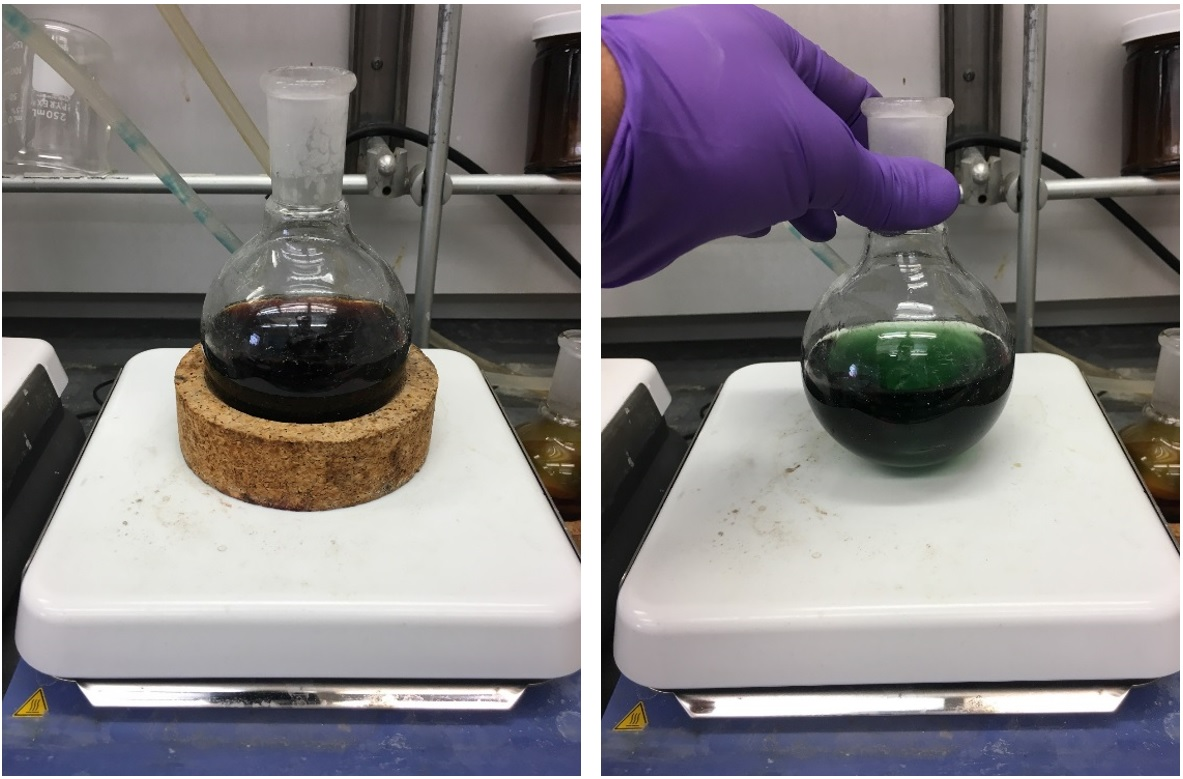
Hoover–Stahl Oxidation of a primary benzylic alcohol on gram scale. Conditions - 3 mol% CuBr, 2,2'-bipyridyl, TEMPO; 6 mol% NMI; 0.2M in acetone. Left image: Time = 0 hr; Right image: Time = 12 hr. Note the change in brown to green color indicating a change in the resting state for the copper species.

=== Hoover–Stahl oxidation ===
The Hoover–Stahl oxidation explicitly indicates the earliest of the Stahl oxidation conditions allowing for the selective oxidation of primary alcohols. The system utilizes 2,2'-bipyridine (bpy), a copper(I) source (typically tetrakis(acetonitrile) copper(I) triflate, tetrafluoroborate, or hexafluorophosphate), TEMPO, and N-methylimidazole. The reaction is conducted in acetonitrile at room temperature under an atmosphere or air. Catalyst loadings are typically around 5 mol %, with N-methylimidazole being used at 10 mol %. The reaction is selective for oxidation of primary alcohols to aldehydes and generally does not oxidize secondary alcohols. Solutions for the Hoover–Stahl oxidation are commercially available from Millipore-Sigma, though the catalyst can be easily prepared in situ from common laboratory reagents.

=== Steves–Stahl oxidation ===
The Steves–Stahl oxidation indicates the use of a less hindered nitroxyl radical in the Stahl oxidation, allowing for the oxidation of secondary alcohols in addition to primary alcohols. The reaction is conducted in acetonitrile at room temperature under an atmosphere of air, or less commonly, under an atmosphere of oxygen. Typically, the nitroxyl radical used in the Steves–Stahl is 9-Azabicyclo[3.3.1]nonane N-Oxyl (ABNO) and is used in conjunction with a more strongly electron-donating 2,2'-bipyridyl ligand compared to bpy, like 4,4'-dimethoxy-2,2'-bipyridine, as this is shown to accelerate alcohol oxidation. Due to the comparatively high price and reactivity of ABNO, common practice is to use it sparingly, oftentimes at catalytic loading of 1 mol % or less. Solutions for the Steves–Stahl oxidation are commercially available through Millipore-Sigma, though the mixture can be easily prepared in situ. Due to the high reagent cost associated with the Steves–Stahl oxidation, it is generally only employed for oxidation of secondary alcohols or after the Hoover–Stahl oxidation has proved fruitless. Several improved methods for the scalable preparation of ABNO have been recently published.

=== Xie–Stahl oxidative lactonization ===
The Xie–Stahl oxidative lactonization is a lactonization reaction which generally employs Steves–Stahl conditions for the oxidative cyclization of diols. The Xie–Stahl reaction lends itself toward selective formation of γ-, δ-, and ε-lactones, forming the carbonyl at the less-hindered primary alcohol. In some instances, higher selectivity can be afforded through the use of 1 mol % TEMPO in place of ABNO.

=== Zultanski–Zhao–Stahl oxidative amide coupling ===
The Zultanski–Zhao–Stahl oxidative amide coupling is a reaction between a primary alcohol and an amine to form an amide. In the Zultanski–Zhao–Stahl reaction, a primary alcohol is oxidized to an aldehyde which, in the presence of an amine, reversibly forms a hemiaminal which is then irreversibly oxidized to the amide by the catalyst. The reaction is performed under an atmosphere of oxygen in the presence of 3Å molecular sieves using relatively high ABNO loading of 3 mol %. Optimal reaction conditions are substrate dependent, requiring specific copper(I) sources, ligands, and solvents depending on the structure of the starting alcohol and amines.
