= Efrat Lifshitz =

Israeli chemist

- אפרת ליפשיץ
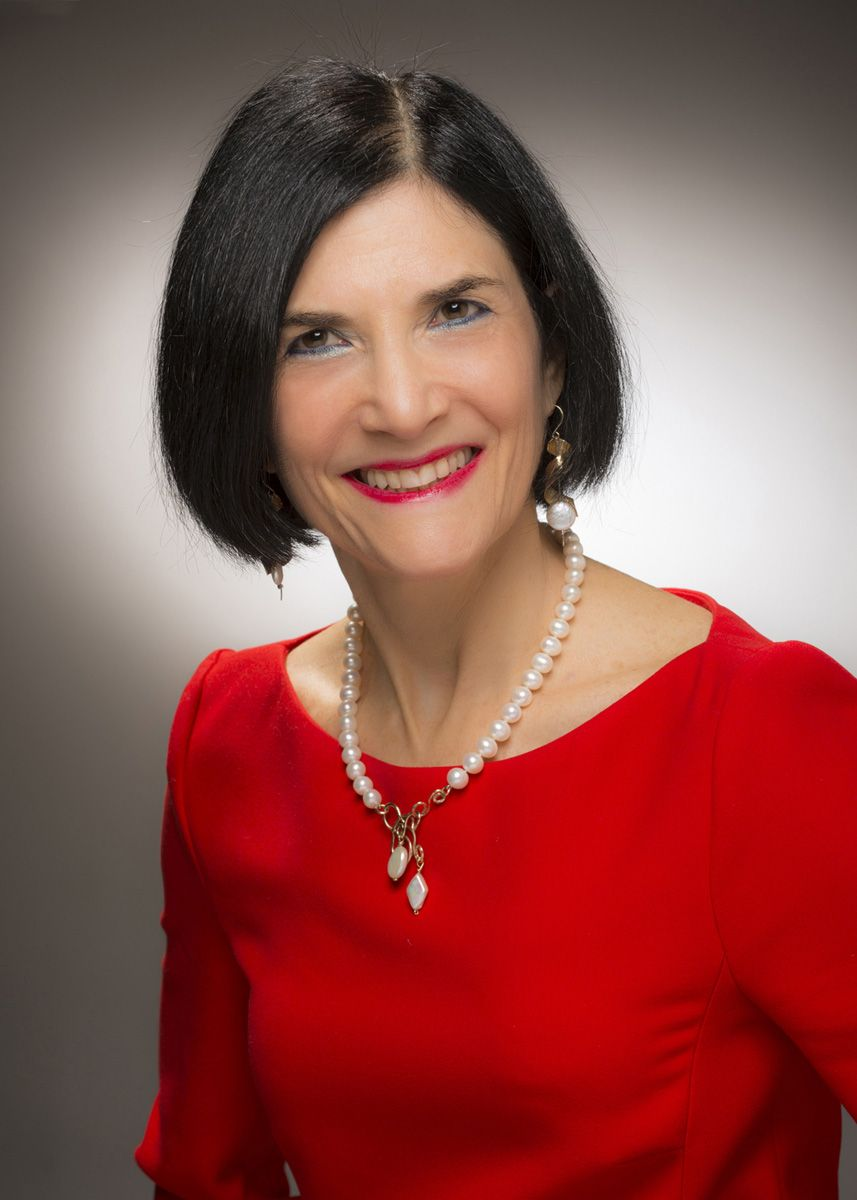
- Efrat Lifshitz, Technion
- Born: 1956 (age 69–70); Haifa, Israel
- Citizenship: Israeli
- Education: Hebrew University of Jerusalem, University of Michigan
- Known for: The pioneering work on low-dimensional semiconductors, exploring the interface between magnetism and their optical properties
- Scientific career
- Fields: Semiconductors, nanoscience, colloidal chemistry, magneto-optics, spintronics
- Workplaces: Technion - Israel Institute of Technology
- Doctoral advisor: Anthony Francis (University of Michigan)

Efrat Lifshitz (Hebrew: אפרת ליפשיץ) is an Israeli chemist at the Schulich Faculty of Chemistry and the Solid-State Institute, Technion – Israel Institute of Technology (Technion-IIT). Lifshitz's research is known for pioneering advances in developing and studying low-dimensional semiconductors by exploring the relationship between their optical properties and magnetism.

== Biography ==
Lifshitz was born in 1956 in Haifa, Israel. She obtained her B.Sc. in Chemistry in 1979 from the Hebrew University of Jerusalem. She received her M.Sc. (1981) and Ph.D. (1984) in Physical Chemistry from the University of Michigan, U.S.A, working under the supervision of Prof. A. Francis. After receiving her Ph.D., Efrat spent one year (1984-85) as a postdoctoral fellow at the Weizmann Institute of Science, Israel. Lifshitz was a research associate at the University of Michigan from 1986 to 1990, immediately after which she joined the Schulich Faculty of Chemistry at the Technion-IIT as an assistant professor. Lifshitz has been a full professor since 2005, leading a semiconductors research laboratory. Since 2009, She is also the Matwei Gunsbuourgh Academic Chair at the Technion-IIT. Since January 2024, Efrat Lifshitz has been the Dean of the Schulich Faculty of Chemistry at the Technion-IIT.

Efrat Lifshitz is married, lives in Haifa, and have three children and four grandchildren.

== Research and publications ==
Lifshitz's research focuses on developing the colloidal nanostructures of II-VI and IV-VI families of semiconductor metal chalcogenides, various van der Waals materials (layered semiconductor materials) of transition metal dichalcogenides, iodides and phosphor-tri-chalcogenides, and two- and three-dimensional perovskite materials, while exploring their magneto-optical properties using state-of-the-art, homemade methodologies, thereby uncovering their size-dependent fundamental features. Lifshitz's expertise in methodologies such as optically detected magnetic resonance (ODMR), magneto-optical confocal microscopy, and circularly polarized photoluminescence has enabled a notable contribution in the detection of Rashba effects due to spin-orbit coupling and symmetry breaking, Zeeman interactions, Coulomb and exchange interactions, and Landé g-factors in nanomaterials. Current research interests include investigating the role of surface-interface centers of core-shell nanocrystals in suppressing the interband Auger decay, developing and characterizing branched nanostructures, proving anisotropies in perovskite materials, and exposing the correlation between long-range magnetic order and optical properties of van der Waals materials. Lifshitz is also involved in corroborating her experimental research with theoretical modeling via density functional theory (DFT) and effective mass approximation method.

Efrat has over 260 scientific publications in the form of several original research articles, invited reviews, and book chapters. She also serves on the editorial board of many peer-reviewed journals. Lifshitz has been a fellow of the Freiburg Institute of Advanced Studies, University of Freiburg in 2015. She has also been a visiting professor at Columbia University, the University of Lyon1, the University of Hamburg, and the University of California, Berkeley.

Efrat Lifshitz has won awards for her scientific contributions, including the Henry Taub Prizes for Academic Excellence, the 2016 Israel Vacuum Society Excellence Award for Research, and the Tenne Family Prize in 2015, which was awarded by the Israel Chemical Society in recognition of her pioneering work in the development of novel magneto-optical methodologies to study the properties of materials at the nanoscale, and UK-Israel Lectureship Award at Oxford University in 2015.
