= Chromium(II) chloride =

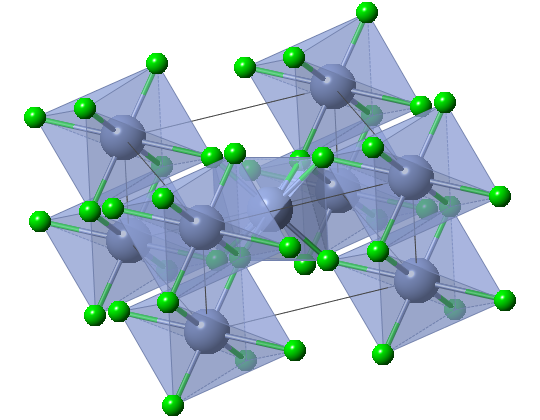
- 3D model of chromium(II) chloride, green atom is chloride

Names
- IUPAC name Chromium(II) chloride
- Other names Chromous chloride

Identifiers
| CAS Number | 10049-05-5 (anhydrous); 13931-94-7 (tetrahydrate) |
| 3D model (JSmol) | anhydrous: Interactive image; tetrahydrate: Interactive image |
| ChemSpider | 23252 |
| ECHA InfoCard | 100.030.136 |
| EC Number | 233-163-3 |
| PubChem CID | 24871 |
| RTECS number | GB5250000 |
| UNII | CET32HKA21 (anhydrous); Q781GP5E2W (tetrahydrate) |
| UN number | 3077 |
| CompTox Dashboard (EPA) | DTXSID20905548 |
- InChI: InChI=1S/2ClH.Cr/h2*1H;/q;;+2/p-2 Key: XBWRJSSJWDOUSJ-UHFFFAOYSA-L; InChI=1/2ClH.Cr/h2*1H;/q;;+2/p-2 Key: XBWRJSSJWDOUSJ-NUQVWONBAQ
- SMILES: anhydrous: [Cr+2].[Cl-].[Cl-]; tetrahydrate: Cl[Cr-4](Cl)([OH2+])([OH2+])([OH2+])[OH2+]

Properties
| Chemical formula | Cl_{2}Cr |
| Molar mass | 122.90 g·mol^{−1} |
| Appearance | White to grey/green powder (anhydrous) blue solid (tetrahydrate) |
| Odor | Odorless |
| Density | 2.88 g/cm^{3} (24 °C) |
| Melting point | 824 °C (1,515 °F; 1,097 K) anhydrous 51 °C (124 °F; 324 K) tetrahydrate, decomposes |
| Boiling point | 1,302 °C (2,376 °F; 1,575 K) anhydrous |
| Solubility in water | Soluble |
| Solubility | Insoluble in alcohol, ether |
| Acidity (pK_{a}) | 2 |
| Magnetic susceptibility (χ) | +7230·10^{−6} cm^{3}/mol |

Structure
| Crystal structure | Orthorhombic (deformed rutile, anhydrous), oP6; Monoclinic (tetrahydrate) |
| Space group | Pnnm, No. 58 (anhydrous); P2_{1}/c, No. 14 (tetrahydrate) |
| Point group | 2/m 2/m 2/m (anhydrous); 2/m (tetrahydrate) |
| Lattice constant | a = 6.64 Å, b = 5.98 Å, c = 3.48 Å (anhydrous) α = 90°, β = 90°, γ = 90° |
| Coordination geometry | Octahedral (Cr^{2+}, anhydrous) |

Thermochemistry
| Heat capacity (C) | 71.2 J/mol K |
| Std molar entropy (S^{⦵}_{298}) | 115.3 J/mol K |
| Std enthalpy of formation (Δ_{f}H^{⦵}_{298}) | −395.4 kJ/mol |
| Gibbs free energy (Δ_{f}G^{⦵}) | −356 kJ/mol |

Hazards
- GHS labelling
| Pictograms | (GHS07: Exclamation mark) |
| Signal word | Warning |
| Hazard statements | H302, H315, H319, H335 |
| Precautionary statements | P261, P305+P351+P338 |
| NFPA 704 (fire diamond) | 2 0 1 |
- Lethal dose or concentration (LD, LC)
| LD_{50} (median dose) | 1870 mg/kg (rats, oral) |
| Safety data sheet (SDS) | Oxford MSDS |

Related compounds
| Other anions | Chromium(II) fluoride Chromium(II) bromide Chromium(II) iodide |
| Other cations | Chromium(III) chloride Chromium(IV) chloride Molybdenum(II) chloride Tungsten(II) chloride |
- Except where otherwise noted, data are given for materials in their standard state (at 25 °C [77 °F], 100 kPa). verify (what is ?) Infobox references

Chromium(II) chloride describes inorganic compounds with the formula CrCl_{2}(H_{2}O)_{n}. The anhydrous solid is white when pure, however commercial samples are often grey or green; it is hygroscopic and readily dissolves in water to give bright blue air-sensitive solutions of the tetrahydrate CrCl_{2}(H_{2}O)_{4}. Chromium(II) chloride has no commercial uses but is used on a laboratory-scale for the synthesis of other chromium complexes.

== Structure and properties ==
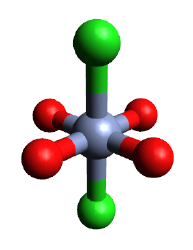
Ball-and-stick model of chromium(II) chloride tetrahydrate.

Anhydrous CrCl_{2} is white however commercial samples are often grey or green. It crystallizes in the Pnnm space group, which is an orthorhombically distorted variant of the rutile structure; making it isostructural to calcium chloride. The Cr centres are octahedral, being distorted by the Jahn-Teller Effect.

The hydrated derivative, CrCl_{2}(H_{2}O)_{4}, forms monoclinic crystals with the P2_{1}/c space group. The molecular geometry is approximately octahedral consisting of four short Cr—O bonds (2.078 Å (207.8 pm)) arranged in a square planar configuration and two longer Cr—Cl bonds (2.758 Å (275.8 pm)) in a trans configuration.

== Synthesis ==
CrCl_{2} is produced by reducing chromium(III) chloride either with hydrogen at 500 °C:

2 CrCl_{3} + H_{2} → 2 CrCl_{2} + 2 HCl

or by electrolysis. Solutions of chromium(II) chloride can be produced by the reaction of chromium metal with hydrochloric acid under argon. Evaporation of this solution under argon produces the blue tetrahydrate.

On the laboratory scale, LiAlH_{4}, zinc, and related reductants produce chromous chloride from chromium(III) precursors:

4 CrCl_{3} + LiAlH_{4} → 4 CrCl_{2} + LiCl + AlCl_{3} + 2 H_{2}

2 CrCl_{3} + Zn → 2 CrCl_{2} + ZnCl_{2}

CrCl_{2} can also be prepared by treating a solution of chromium(II) acetate with hydrogen chloride:

Cr_{2}(OAc)_{4} + 4 HCl → 2 CrCl_{2} + 4 AcOH

Treatment of chromium powder with concentrated hydrochloric acid gives blue hydrated chromium(II) chloride, which can be converted to a related acetonitrile complex.

Cr + n H_{2}O + 2 HCl → CrCl_{2}(H_{2}O)_{n} + H_{2}

== Reactions ==
The reduction potential for Cr^{3+} + e^{−} ⇌ Cr^{2+} is −0.41 V. Since the reduction potential of 2 H^{+} + 2e^{−} ⇌ H_{2} in acidic conditions is +0.00 V, the chromous ion has sufficient potential to reduce acids to hydrogen, although this reaction does not occur without a catalyst.

=== Organic chemistry ===
Chromium(II) chloride is used as precursor to other inorganic and organometallic chromium complexes. Alkyl halides and nitroaromatics are reduced by CrCl_{2}. The moderate electronegativity of chromium and the range of substrates that CrCl_{2} can accommodate make organochromium reagents very synthetically versatile. It is a reagent in the Nozaki-Hiyama-Kishi reaction, a useful method for preparing medium-size rings. It is also used in the Takai olefination to form vinyl iodides from aldehydes in the presence of iodoform.
