= Chromium(II) iodide =

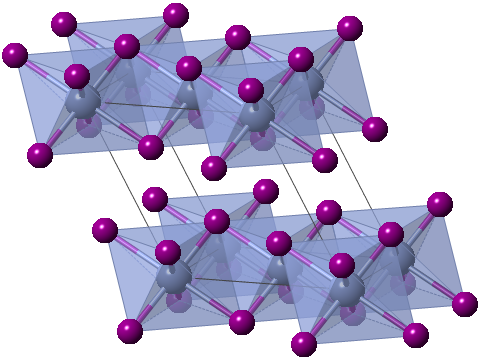

Names
- Other names Chromous iodide

Identifiers
CAS Number	13478-28-9
3D model (JSmol)	Interactive image
ChemSpider	13318420
PubChem CID	18626753
CompTox Dashboard (EPA)	DTXSID20595261
- InChI: InChI=1S/Cr.2HI/h;2*1H/q+2;;/p-2 Key: BMSDTRMGXCBBBH-UHFFFAOYSA-L
- SMILES: [Cr+2].[I-].[I-]

Properties
Chemical formula	CrI_{2}
Molar mass	305.8050 g·mol^{−1}
Appearance	black deliquescent solid
Density	5.196 g/cm^{3}

Hazards
- GHS labelling
Pictograms	(GHS07: Exclamation mark) (GHS08: Health hazard)
Signal word	Warning
Hazard statements	H302, H317, H334
Precautionary statements	P233, P260, P264, P270, P271, P272, P280, P284, P301+P317, P302+P352, P304+P340, P321, P330, P333+P317, P342+P316, P362+P364, P403, P501

Related compounds
Other anions	Chromium(II) fluoride; Chromium(II) chloride; Chromium(II) bromide
Related compounds	Chromium(III) iodide
- Except where otherwise noted, data are given for materials in their standard state (at 25 °C [77 °F], 100 kPa). Infobox references

Chromium(II) iodide is the inorganic compound with the formula CrI_{2}. It is a red-brown or black solid. The compound is made by thermal decomposition of chromium(III) iodide. Like many metal diiodides, CrI_{2} adopts the "cadmium iodide structure" motif, i.e., it features sheets of octahedral Cr(II) centers interconnected by bridging iodide ligands. Reflecting the effects of its d^{4} configuration, chromium's coordination sphere is highly distorted.

Treatment of chromium powder with concentrated hydroiodic acid gives a blue hydrated chromium(II) iodide, which can be converted to related acetonitrile complexes.

Cr + n H_{2}O + 2 HI → CrI_{2}(H_{2}O)_{n} + H_{2}
