= Chromium(III) iodide =

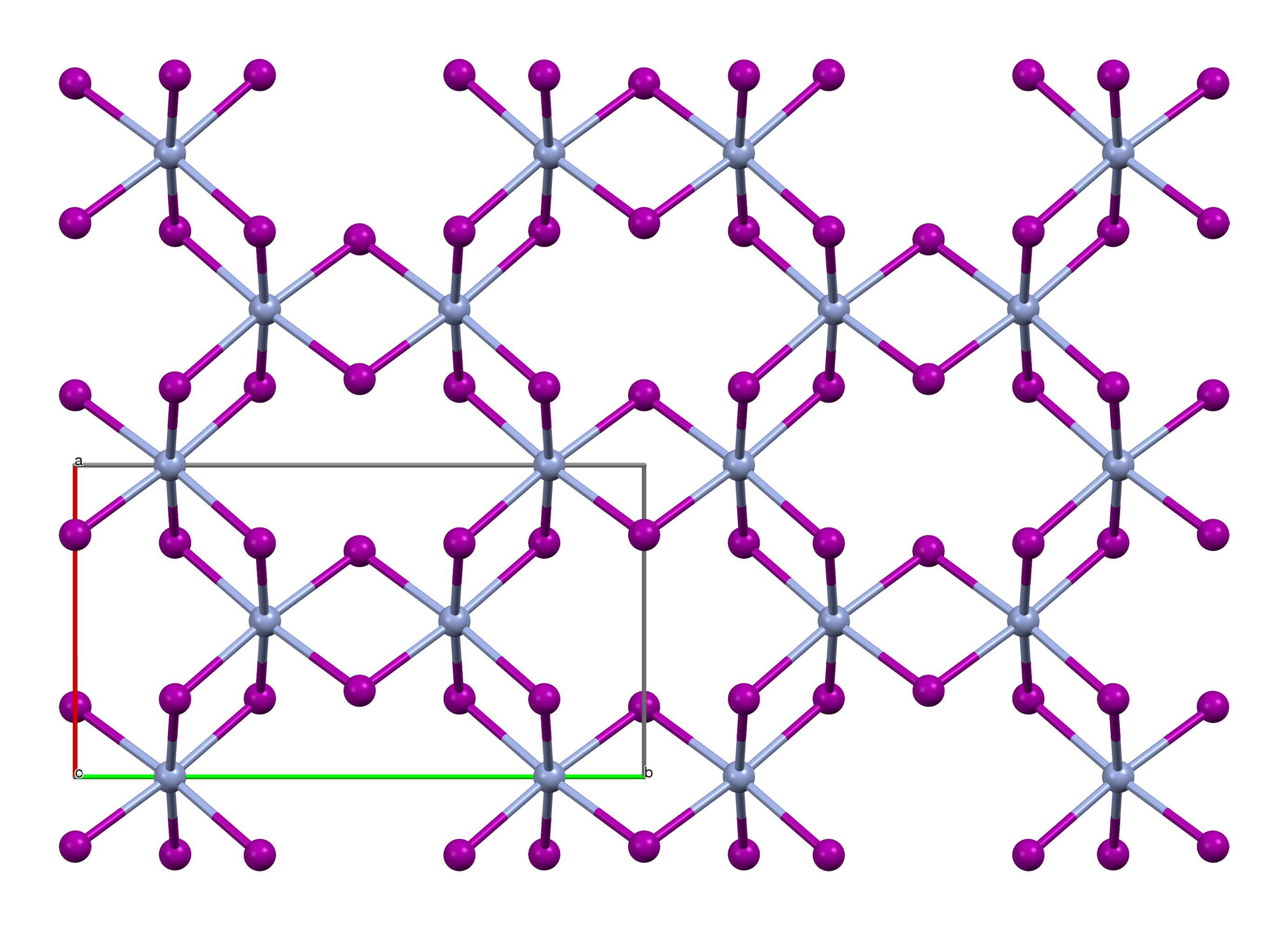

Names
- IUPAC name Chromium(III) iodide
- Other names Chromium triiodide, chromic iodide

Identifiers
CAS Number	13569-75-0
3D model (JSmol)	Interactive image
ChemSpider	75416
ECHA InfoCard	100.033.614
EC Number	236-991-3
PubChem CID	83586
CompTox Dashboard (EPA)	DTXSID50929111
- InChI: InChI=1S/Cr.3HI/h;3*1H/q+3;;;/p-3 Key: PPUZYFWVBLIDMP-UHFFFAOYSA-K; InChI=1/Cr.3HI/h;3*1H/q+3;;;/p-3/rCrI3/c2-1(3)4 Key: PPUZYFWVBLIDMP-GXOYXQMQAU
- SMILES: [Cr](I)(I)I

Properties
Chemical formula	CrI_{3}
Molar mass	432.7095 g·mol^{−1}
Appearance	black solid
Density	5.32 g/cm^{3}
Melting point	> 600 °C (1,112 °F; 873 K)
Solubility in water	Soluble

Hazards
- GHS labelling
Pictograms	(GHS05: Corrosive) (GHS06: Toxic)
Signal word	Danger
Hazard statements	H301, H314
Precautionary statements	P260, P264, P264+P265, P270, P280, P301+P316, P301+P330+P331, P302+P361+P354, P304+P340, P305+P354+P338, P316, P317, P321, P330, P363, P405, P501
- Except where otherwise noted, data are given for materials in their standard state (at 25 °C [77 °F], 100 kPa). Infobox references

Chromium(III) iodide, also known as chromium triiodide, is an inorganic compound with the formula CrI_{3}. It is a black solid that is used to prepare other chromium iodides.

Like the isomorphous chromium(III) chloride (CrCl_{3}), chromium(III) iodide exhibits a cubic-closest packing arrangement in a double-layer crystal lattice. In this structure, chromium exhibits octahedral coordination geometry.

== Preparation and properties ==
Chromium triiodide is prepared by the direct reaction of chromium metal with an excess of iodine. The reaction is conducted at 500 °C:

2 Cr + 3 I_{2} → 2 CrI_{3}

To obtain high purity samples, the product is thermally decomposed at 700 °C to sublime out chromium(II) iodide. The diiodide is then reiodinated.

Chromium triiodide is stable in contact with oxygen and moisture, but at temperatures approaching 200 °C it reacts with oxygen and releases iodine. Like CrCl_{3}, the triiodide exhibits slow solubility in water owing to the kinetic inertness of Cr(III). Addition of small amounts of chromous iodide accelerates the dissolving process.

Chromium triiodide can also be prepared as colloidal nanoplatelets, a type of lateral nanostructure. The alkoxide Cr(OC(CH_{3})(C(CH_{3})_{3})_{2})_{3} is dissolved in toluene under an inert atmosphere, followed by the addition of trimethylsilyl iodide. The mixture is sealed and immersed into a preheated oil bath at 135 °C, resulting in the formation of a black precipitate.

Chromium triiodide was one of the first materials which was discovered to be a magnetic two-dimensional material that has great potentials for spintronics devices.
