= Chromium hexafluoride =

Hypothetical chemical compound

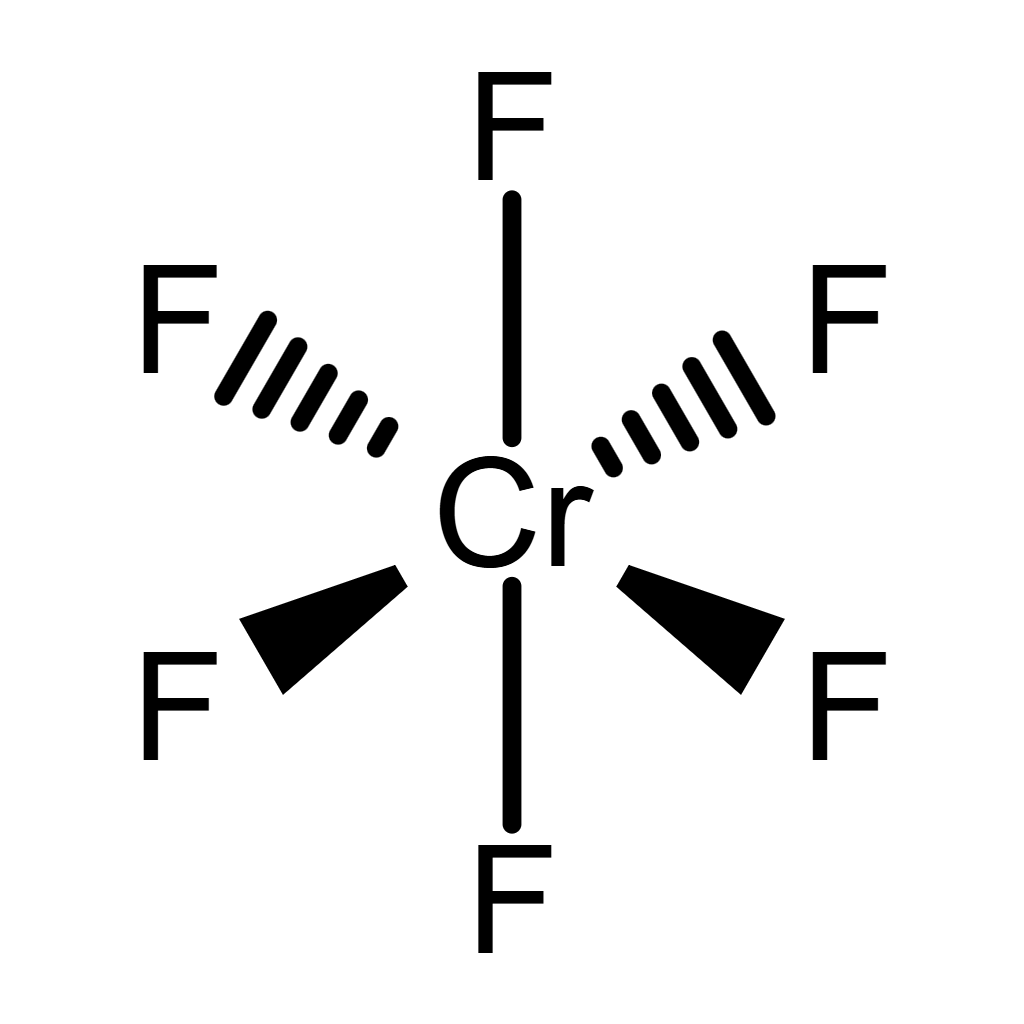

Names
- IUPAC name: Chromium hexafluoride; Chromium(VI) fluoride
- Other names: Hexafluorochromium; Hexafluoridochromium

Identifiers
CAS Number	13843-28-2
3D model (JSmol)	Interactive image
ChEBI	CHEBI:33044
ChemSpider	4574205
PubChem CID	5460740
CompTox Dashboard (EPA)	DTXSID201045352
- InChI: InChI=1S/Cr.6FH/h;6*1H/q+6;;;;;;/p-6 Key: ZLMUYRIFFZDBSE-UHFFFAOYSA-H
- SMILES: F[Cr](F)(F)(F)(F)F

Properties
Chemical formula	CrF_{6}
Molar mass	165.9865 g·mol^{−1}

Related compounds
Related compounds	Molybdenum hexafluoride; Tungsten hexafluoride; Chromium pentafluoride; Chromium(IV) fluoride; Chromium(III) fluoride; Chromium(II) fluoride
- Except where otherwise noted, data are given for materials in their standard state (at 25 °C [77 °F], 100 kPa). Infobox references

Chromium hexafluoride or chromium(VI) fluoride is a hypothetical chemical compound between chromium and fluorine with the chemical formula CrF_{6}. It was previously thought to be an unstable yellow solid decomposing at −100 °C, but this has been shown to be a misidentification of chromium pentafluoride, CrF_{5}.

== Unsuccessful attempts at synthesis ==
CrF_{6} used to be thought to be produced by exhaustive fluorination of chromium metal at 400 °C (752 °F) and 20 MPa of pressure, and immediate freezing out of the reaction chamber to prevent decomposition:

Cr + 3 F_{2} → CrF_{6}

However, it has been shown that chromium pentafluoride (CrF_{5}) is formed instead:

2 Cr + 5 F_{2} → 2 CrF_{5}

and that CrF_{6} has yet to be synthesized.
