= Chromium(II) bromide =

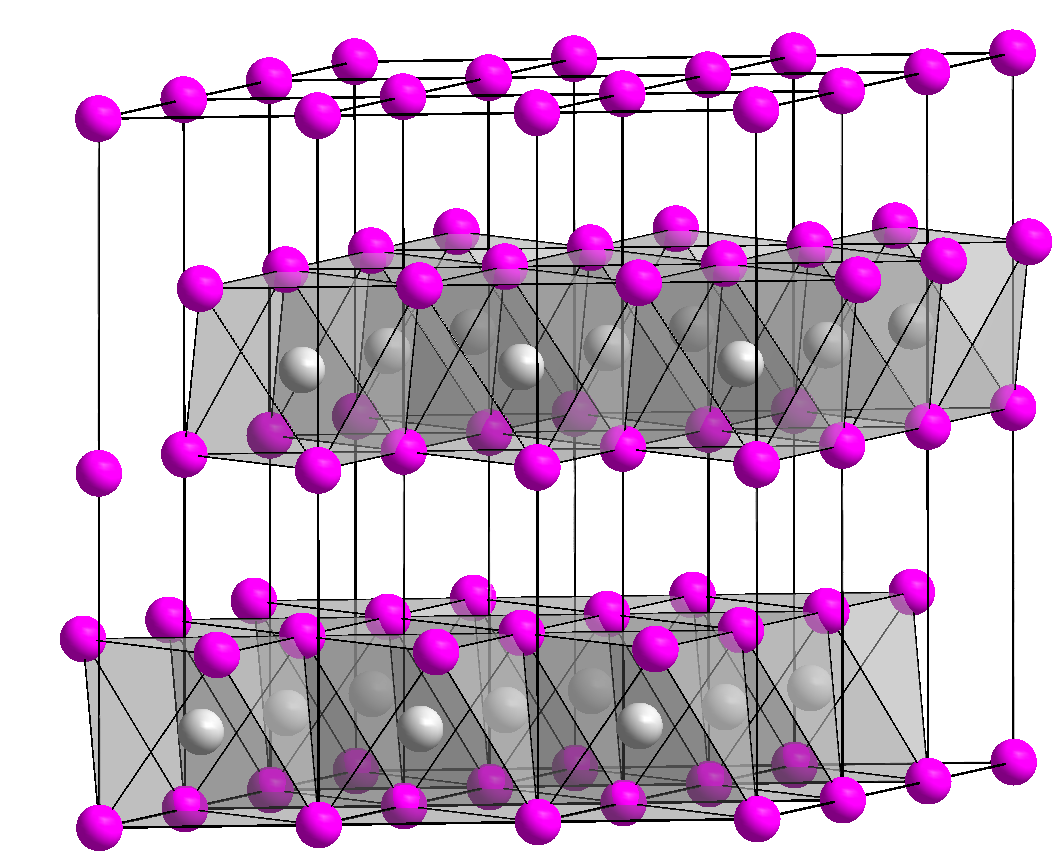

Names
- IUPAC name Chromium(II) bromide
- Other names: Chromium dibromide; Chromium bromide; Chromous bromide

Identifiers
CAS Number	10049-25-9
3D model (JSmol)	Interactive image
ChemSpider	9249842
PubChem CID	21908600
UNII	6S9M6JI7W3
CompTox Dashboard (EPA)	DTXSID90619903
- InChI: InChI=1S/2BrH.Cr/h2*1H;/q;;+2/p-2 Key: XZQOHYZUWTWZBL-UHFFFAOYSA-L
- SMILES: [Cr+2].[Br-].[Br-]

Properties
Chemical formula	CrBr_{2}
Molar mass	211.804 g·mol^{−1}
Appearance	White solid
Density	4.236 g/cm^{3}
Melting point	842 °C (1,548 °F; 1,115 K)
Solubility in water	soluble, exothermal blue solution

Structure
Crystal structure	monoclinic

Related compounds
Other anions	Chromium(II) fluoride; Chromium(II) chloride; Chromium(II) iodide
Related compounds	Chromium(III) bromide
- Except where otherwise noted, data are given for materials in their standard state (at 25 °C [77 °F], 100 kPa). Infobox references

Chromium(II) bromide is the inorganic compound with the chemical formula CrBr_{2}. Like many metal dihalides, CrBr_{2} adopts the "cadmium iodide structure" motif, i.e., it features sheets of octahedral Cr(II) centers interconnected by bridging bromide ligands. It is a white solid that dissolves in water to give blue solutions that are readily oxidized by air.

== Synthesis and reactions ==
It can be prepared by reduction of chromium(III) bromide with hydrogen gas for 6–10 hours at 350-400 °C, cogenerating hydrogen bromide:

2 CrBr_{3} + H_{2} → 2 CrBr_{2} + 2 HBr

Treatment of chromium powder with concentrated hydrobromic acid gives a blue hydrated chromium(II) bromide, which can be converted to a related acetonitrile complex.

Cr + n H_{2}O + 2 HBr → CrBr_{2}(H_{2}O)_{n} + H_{2}
