= Chromium(IV) bromide =

Chemical substance

Names
- Other names Chromium tetrabromide

Identifiers
CAS Number	23098-84-2
3D model (JSmol)	Interactive image
PubChem CID	158310797
- InChI: InChI=1S/4BrH.Cr/h4*1H;/q;;;;+4/p-4 Key: GNQRKRWXMCKSNJ-UHFFFAOYSA-J
- SMILES: [Cr+4].[Br-].[Br-].[Br-].[Br-]

Properties
Chemical formula	CrBr_{4}
Appearance	gas
Solubility in water	Soluble
- Except where otherwise noted, data are given for materials in their standard state (at 25 °C [77 °F], 100 kPa). Infobox references

Chromium(IV) bromide is an inorganic chemical compound with the chemical formula CrBr_{4}. It is composed of chromium and bromine.

== Synthesis ==
The compound can be prepared by treating chromium tribromide with corresponding bromine at high temperature.

== Physical properties ==
The compound only occurs in the gas phase.
