= Chromium(III) chloride =

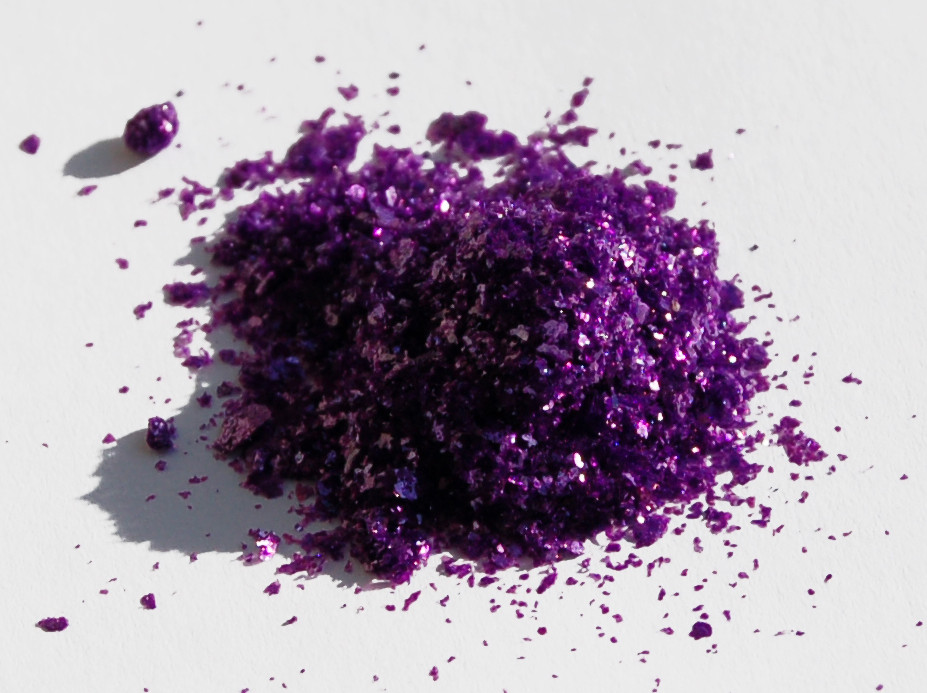
- Anhydrous

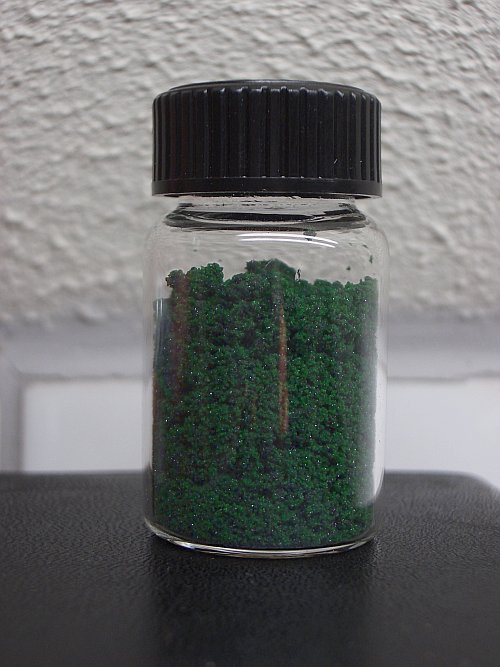
- Green form of chromium(III) chloride hexahydrate Hexahydrate

Names
- IUPAC name: Chromium(III) chloride; Chromium trichloride
- Other names Chromic chloride

Identifiers
CAS Number	10025-73-7; 10060-12-5 (hexahydrate)
3D model (JSmol)	anhydrous: Interactive image; common hexahydrate: Interactive image
ChEBI	CHEBI:53351
ChEMBL	ChEMBL1200528
ChemSpider	4954736
DrugBank	DB09129
ECHA InfoCard	100.030.023
Gmelin Reference	1890 130477 532690
PubChem CID	24808
RTECS number	GB5425000
UNII	Z310X5O5RP; KB1PCR9DMW (hexahydrate)
CompTox Dashboard (EPA)	DTXSID20858722
- InChI: InChI=1S/3ClH.Cr/h3*1H;/q;;;+3/p-3 Key: QSWDMMVNRMROPK-UHFFFAOYSA-K; InChI=1/3ClH.Cr/h3*1H;/q;;;+2/p-3 Key: HUQISNLCWMVGCG-DFZHHIFOAJ; InChI=1/3ClH.Cr/h3*1H;/q;;;+3/p-3 Key: QSWDMMVNRMROPK-DFZHHIFOAF
- SMILES: anhydrous: Cl[Cr](Cl)Cl; common hexahydrate: Cl[Cr-3](Cl)([OH2+])([OH2+])([OH2+])[OH2+].[Cl-].O.O

Properties
Chemical formula	CrCl_{3}
Molar mass	158.36 g/mol (anhydrous); 266.45 g/mol (hexahydrate)
Appearance	Purple (anhydrous), dark green (hexahydrate)
Density	2.87 g/cm^{3} (anhydrous); 1.760 g/cm^{3} (hexahydrate)
Melting point	1,152 °C (2,106 °F; 1,425 K) (anhydrous); 81 °C (hexahydrate)
Boiling point	1,300 °C (2,370 °F; 1,570 K) decomposes
Solubility in water	slightly soluble (anhydrous); 585 g/L (hexahydrate)
Solubility	insoluble in ethanol insoluble in ether, acetone
Acidity (pK_{a})	2.4 (0.2M solution)
Magnetic susceptibility (χ)	+6890.0·10^{−6} cm^{3}/mol

Structure
Crystal structure	YCl_{3} structure
Coordination geometry	Octahedral

Hazards
- GHS labelling
Pictograms	(GHS05: Corrosive) (GHS07: Exclamation mark) (GHS09: Environmental hazard)
Signal word	Danger
Hazard statements	H302, H314, H411
Precautionary statements	P260, P264, P270, P273, P280, P301+P312, P301+P330+P331, P303+P361+P353, P304+P340, P305+P351+P338, P310, P321, P330, P363, P391, P405, P501
NFPA 704 (fire diamond)	3 0 0
Flash point	Non-flammable
- Lethal dose or concentration (LD, LC)
LD_{50} (median dose)	1870 mg/kg (oral, rat)
- NIOSH (US health exposure limits)
PEL (Permissible)	TWA 1 mg/m^{3}
REL (Recommended)	TWA 0.5 mg/m^{3}
IDLH (Immediate danger)	250 mg/m^{3}
Safety data sheet (SDS)	ICSC 1316 (anhydrous); ICSC 1532 (hexahydrate)

Related compounds
Other anions	Chromium(III) fluoride; Chromium(III) bromide; Chromium(III) iodide
Other cations	Molybdenum(III) chloride; Tungsten(III) chloride
Related compounds	Chromium(II) chloride; Chromium(IV) chloride
- Except where otherwise noted, data are given for materials in their standard state (at 25 °C [77 °F], 100 kPa). verify (what is ?) Infobox references

Chromium(III) chloride (also called chromic chloride, or chromium trichloride) is an inorganic chemical compound with the chemical formula CrCl_{3}. This crystalline salt forms several hydrates with the formula CrCl_{3}·nH_{2}O, among which are hydrates where n can be 5 (chromium(III) chloride pentahydrate CrCl_{3}·5H_{2}O) or 6 (chromium(III) chloride hexahydrate CrCl_{3}·6H_{2}O). The anhydrous compound with the formula CrCl_{3} are violet crystals, while the most common form of the chromium(III) chloride are the dark green crystals of hexahydrate, CrCl_{3}·6H_{2}O. Chromium chlorides find use as catalysts and as precursors to dyes for wool.

== Structure ==
Anhydrous chromium(III) chloride adopts the YCl_{3} structure, with Cr^{3+} occupying one third of the octahedral interstices in alternating layers of a pseudo-cubic close packed lattice of Cl^{−} ions. The absence of cations in alternate layers leads to weak bonding between adjacent layers. For this reason, crystals of CrCl_{3} cleave easily along the planes between layers, which results in the flaky (micaceous) appearance of samples of chromium(III) chloride. The anhydrous CrCl_{3} is exfoliable down to the monolayer limit. If pressurized to 9.9 GPa it goes under a phase transition.

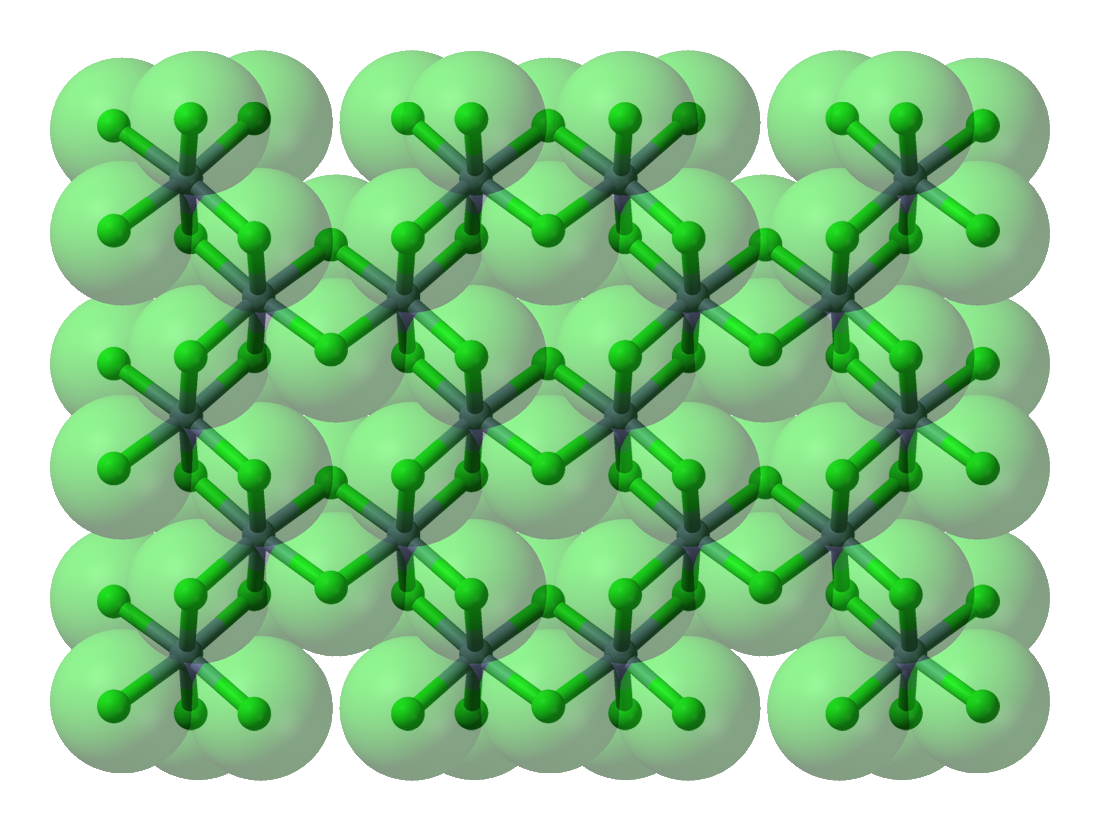
Space-filling model of cubic close packing of chloride ions in the crystal structure of CrCl_{3}

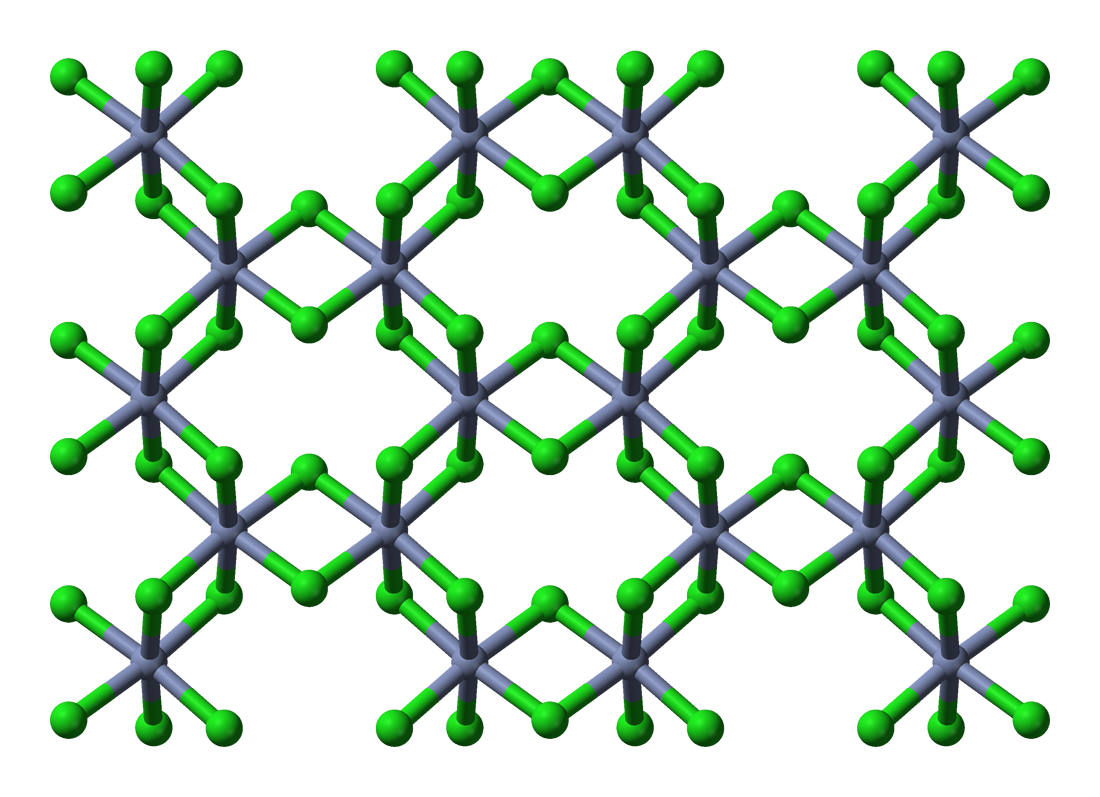
Ball-and-stick model of part of a layer

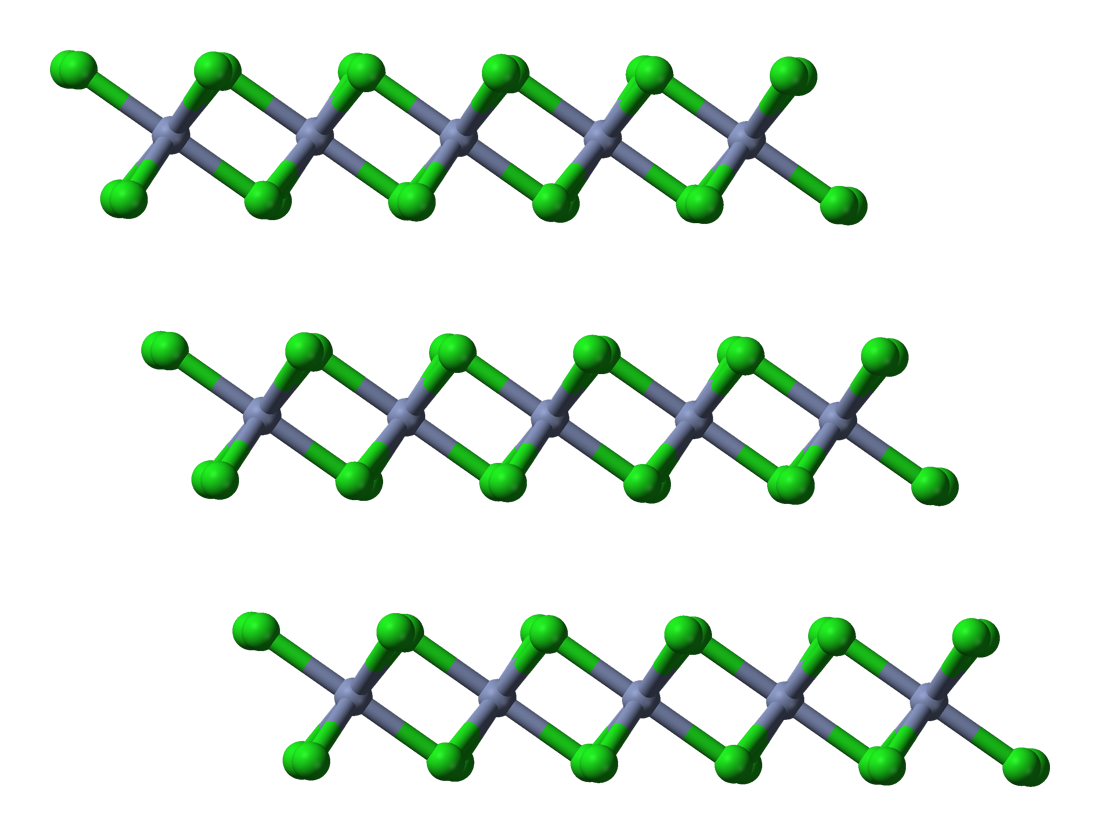
Stacking of layers

=== Chromium(III) chloride hydrates ===
The hydrated chromium(III) chlorides display the somewhat unusual property of existing in a number of distinct chemical forms (isomers), which differ in terms of the number of chloride anions that are coordinated to Cr(III) and the water of crystallization. The different forms exist both as solids and in aqueous solutions. Several members are known of the series of [CrCl_{3−q}(H_{2}O)_{n}]^{q+}. The common hexahydrate can be more precisely described as [CrCl_{2}(H_{2}O)_{4}]Cl·2H_{2}O. It consists of the cation trans-[CrCl_{2}(H_{2}O)_{4}]^{+} and additional molecules of water and a chloride anion in the lattice. Two other hydrates are known, pale green [CrCl(H_{2}O)_{5}]Cl_{2}·H_{2}O and violet [Cr(H_{2}O)_{6}]Cl_{3}. Similar hydration isomerism is seen with other chromium(III) compounds.

== Preparation ==
Anhydrous chromium(III) chloride may be prepared by chlorination of chromium metal directly, or indirectly by carbothermic chlorination of chromium(III) oxide at 650–800 °C

Cr_{2}O_{3} + 3 C + 3 Cl_{2} → 2 CrCl_{3} + 3 CO

The hydrated chlorides are prepared by treatment of chromate with hydrochloric acid and aqueous methanol.

== Reactions ==
Slow reaction rates are common with chromium(III) complexes. The low reactivity of the d^{3} Cr^{3+} ion can be explained using crystal field theory. One way of opening CrCl_{3} up to substitution in solution is to reduce even a trace amount to CrCl_{2}, for example using zinc in hydrochloric acid. This chromium(II) compound undergoes substitution easily, and it can exchange electrons with CrCl_{3} via a chloride bridge, allowing all of the CrCl_{3} to react quickly. With the presence of some chromium(II), solid CrCl_{3} dissolves rapidly in water. Similarly, ligand substitution reactions of solutions of [CrCl_{2}(H_{2}O)_{4}]^{+} are accelerated by chromium(II) catalysts.

With molten alkali metal chlorides such as potassium chloride, CrCl_{3} gives salts of the type M_{3}[CrCl_{6}] and K_{3}[Cr_{2}Cl_{9}], which is also octahedral but where the two chromiums are linked via three chloride bridges.

The hexahydrate can also be dehydrated with thionyl chloride:

CrCl_{3}·6H_{2}O + 6 SOCl_{2} → CrCl_{3} + 6 SO_{2} + 12 HCl

=== Complexes with organic ligands ===
CrCl_{3} is a Lewis acid, classified as "hard" according to the Hard-Soft Acid-Base theory. It forms a variety of adducts of the type [CrCl_{3}L_{3}]^{q+}, where L is a Lewis base. For example, it reacts with pyridine (C_{5}H_{5}N) to form the pyridine complex:

CrCl_{3} + 3 C_{5}H_{5}N → CrCl_{3}(C_{5}H_{5}N)_{3}

Treatment with trimethylsilylchloride in THF gives the anhydrous THF complex:

CrCl_{3}·6H_{2}O + 12 (CH_{3})_{3}SiCl → CrCl_{3}(THF)_{3} + 6 ((CH_{3})_{3}Si)_{2}O + 12 HCl

=== Precursor to organochromium complexes ===
Chromium(III) chloride is used as the precursor to many organochromium compounds, for example bis(benzene)chromium, an analogue of ferrocene:

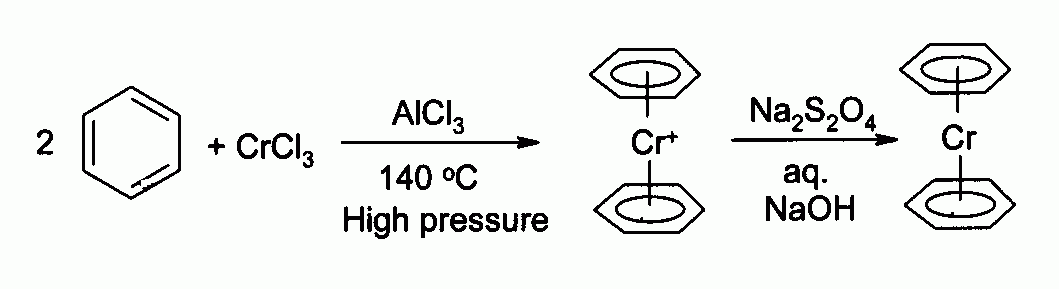

Phosphine complexes derived from CrCl_{3} catalyse the trimerization of ethylene to 1-hexene.

=== Use in organic synthesis ===
One niche use of CrCl_{3} in organic synthesis is for the in situ preparation of chromium(II) chloride, a reagent for the reduction of alkyl halides and for the synthesis of (E)-alkenyl halides. The reaction is usually performed using two moles of CrCl_{3} per mole of lithium aluminium hydride, although if aqueous acidic conditions are appropriate zinc and hydrochloric acid may be sufficient.

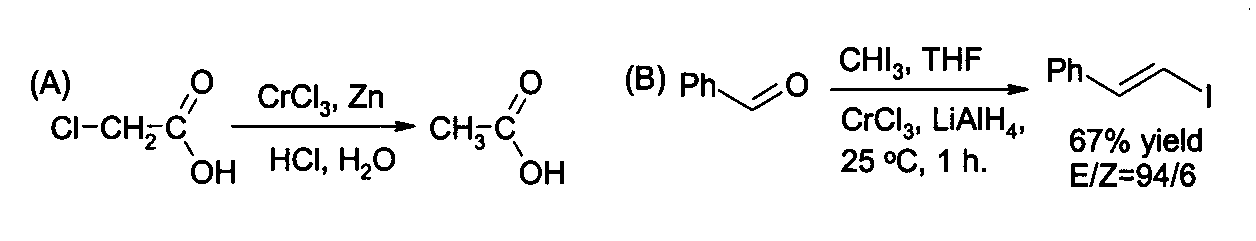

Chromium(III) chloride has also been used as a Lewis acid in organic reactions, for example to catalyse the nitroso Diels-Alder reaction.

=== Dyestuffs ===
A number of chromium-containing dyes are used commercially for wool. Typical dyes are triarylmethanes consisting of ortho-hydroxylbenzoic acid derivatives.

== Precautions ==
Although trivalent chromium is far less poisonous than hexavalent, chromium salts are generally considered toxic.
