= Chromium pentafluoride =

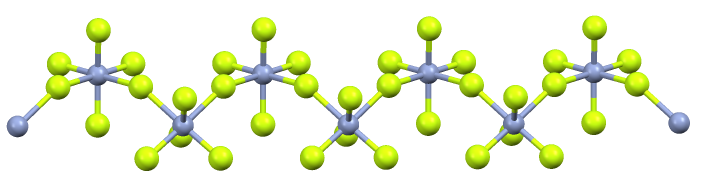

Names
- IUPAC name Chromium(V) fluoride
- Other names: Chromium fluoride; Chromium(V) fluoride; Pentafluorochromium; Pentafluoridochromium

Identifiers
| CAS Number | 14884-42-5 |
| 3D model (JSmol) | Interactive image |
| ChemSpider | 4574207 |
| PubChem CID | 5460742 |
| CompTox Dashboard (EPA) | DTXSID601030434 |
- InChI: InChI=1S/Cr.5FH/h;5*1H/q+5;;;;;/p-5 Key: OMKYWARVLGERCK-UHFFFAOYSA-I
- SMILES: F[Cr](F)(F)(F)F

Properties
| Chemical formula | CrF_{5} |
| Molar mass | 146.988 g/mol |
| Appearance | red crystals |
| Density | 2.89 g/cm^{3} |
| Melting point | 34 °C (93 °F; 307 K) |
| Boiling point | 117 °C (243 °F; 390 K) |

Structure
| Crystal structure | orthorhombic |
| Space group | Pbcm, No. 57 |
| Lattice constant | a = 782.9 pm, b = 753.4 pm, c = 551.8 pm |
| Formula units (Z) | 4 |
| Coordination geometry | octahedral |

Related compounds
| Related compounds | Chromium difluoride; Chromium trifluoride; Chromium tetrafluoride |
- Except where otherwise noted, data are given for materials in their standard state (at 25 °C [77 °F], 100 kPa). Infobox references

Chromium pentafluoride is the inorganic compound with the chemical formula CrF_{5}. It is a red volatile solid that melts at 34 °C. It is the highest known chromium fluoride, since the hypothetical chromium hexafluoride has not yet been synthesized.

Chromium pentafluoride is one of the products of the action of fluorine on a mixture of potassium and chromic chlorides.

In terms of its structure, the compound is a one-dimensional coordination polymer. Each Cr(V) center has octahedral molecular geometry. It has the same crystal structure as vanadium pentafluoride.

Chromium pentafluoride is strongly oxidizing, able to fluorinate the noble gas xenon and oxidize dioxygen to dioxygenyl. Due to this property, it decomposes readily in the presence of reducing agents, and easily hydrolyses to chromium(III) and chromium(VI).

== Reactions ==
Chromium pentafluoride can react with Lewis bases such as caesium fluoride and nitryl fluoride to give the respective hexafluorochromate(V) salt.

CrF_{5} + CsF → CsCrF_{6}

Chromium pentafluoride can also react with the Lewis acid antimony pentafluoride to give the CrF_{5}·2SbF_{5} adduct. The adduct was found to be a strong oxidizing agent, liquid at room temperature with a melting point of −23 °C.
