= Tetrakis(acetonitrile)copper(I) hexafluorophosphate =

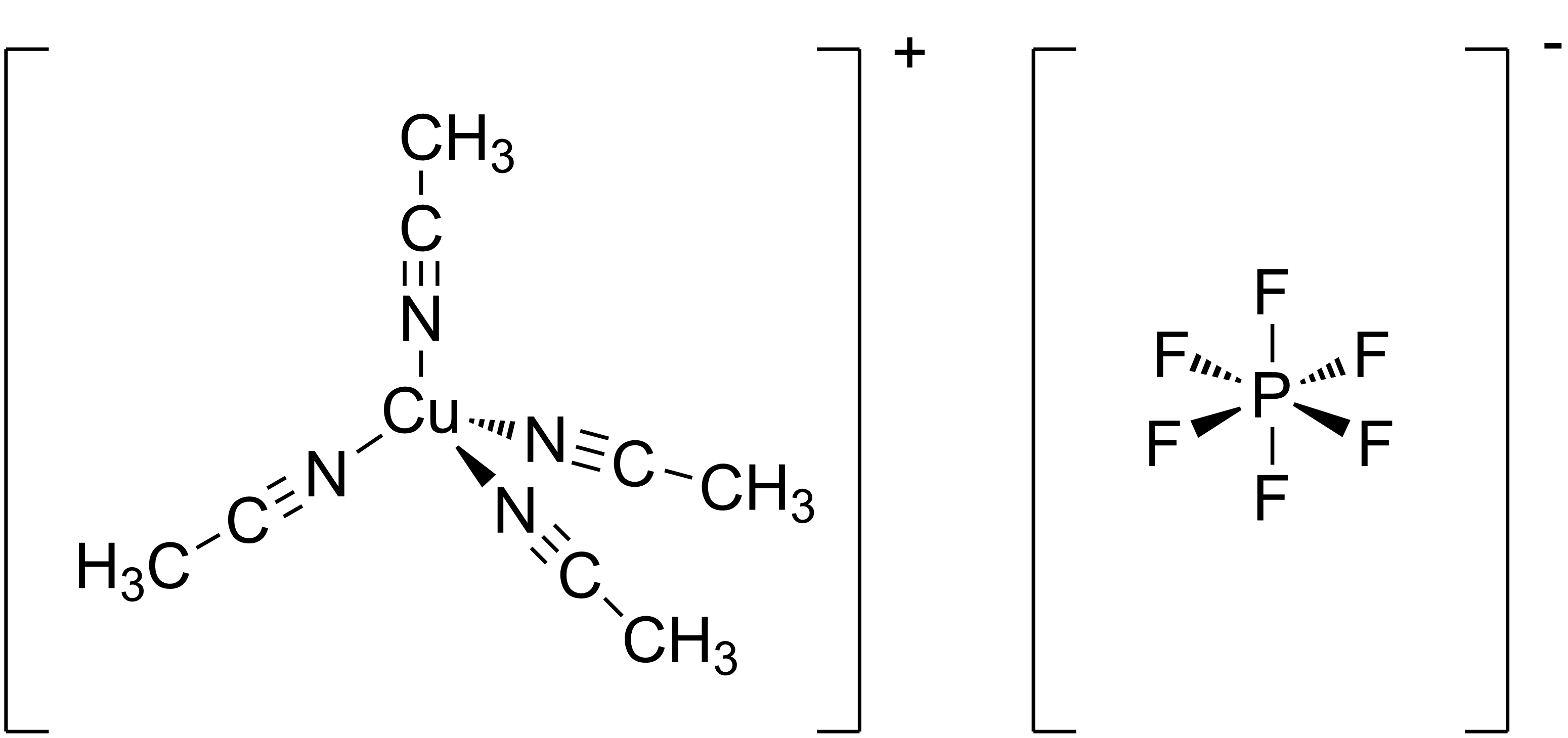

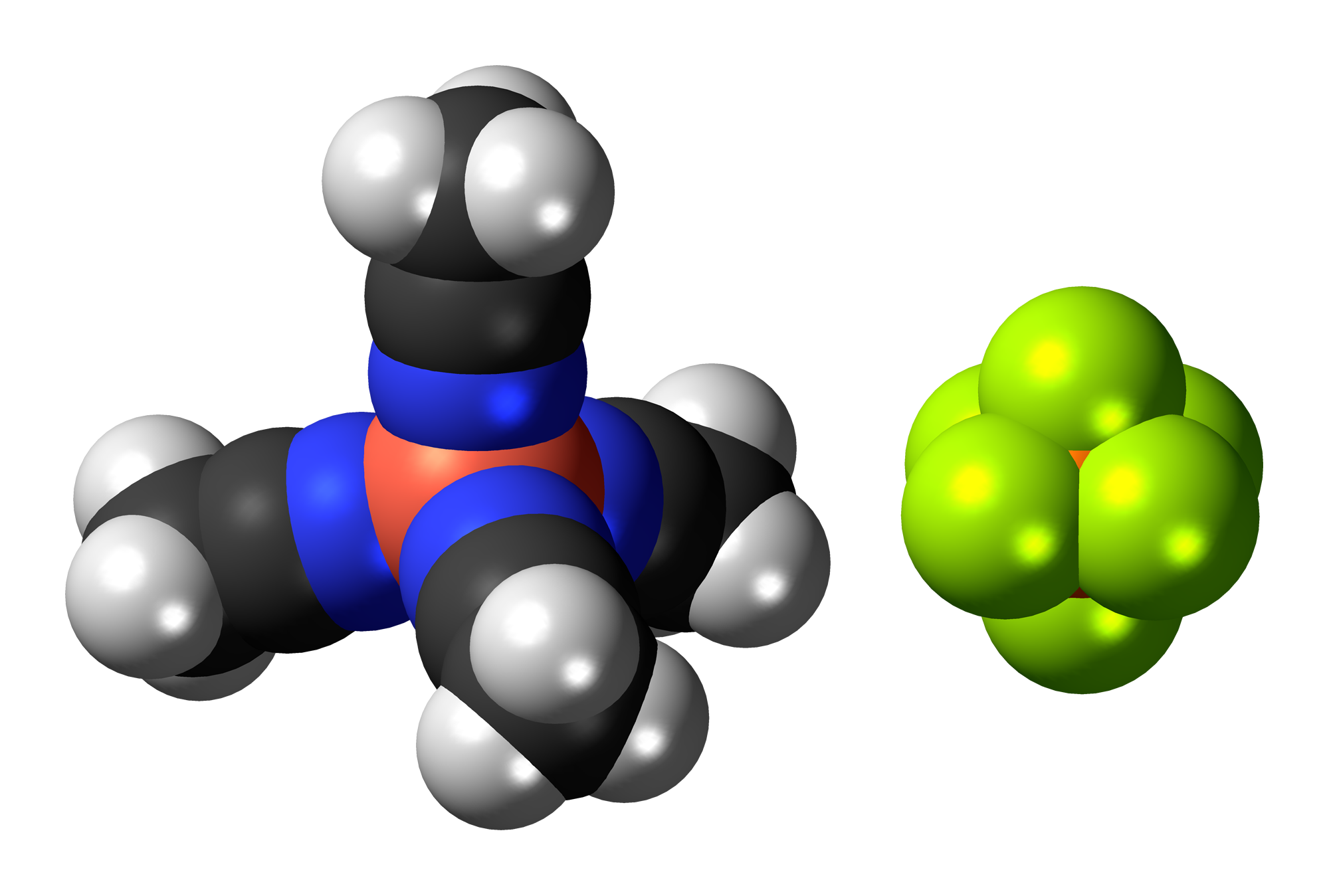

Names
- IUPAC name Tetrakis(acetonitrile)copper(I) hexafluorophosphate

Identifiers
CAS Number	64443-05-6
3D model (JSmol)	Interactive image
ChemSpider	9243889
ECHA InfoCard	100.198.153
EC Number	672-617-9
PubChem CID	11068737
CompTox Dashboard (EPA)	DTXSID70983013
- InChI: InChI=1S/4C2H3N.Cu.F6P/c4*1-2-3;;1-7(2,3,4,5)6/h4*1H3;;/q;;;;+1;-1 Key: GNQXUMGHBSAQBV-UHFFFAOYSA-N
- SMILES: CC#N.CC#N.CC#N.CC#N.F[P-](F)(F)(F)(F)F.[Cu+]

Properties
Chemical formula	[Cu(CH_{3}CN)_{4}]PF_{6}
Molar mass	372.7198 g/mol
Appearance	White powder
Melting point	160 °C (320 °F; 433 K)

Hazards
- GHS labelling
Pictograms	(GHS07: Exclamation mark)
Signal word	Warning
Hazard statements	H315, H319, H335
Precautionary statements	P261, P264, P264+P265, P271, P280, P302+P352, P304+P340, P305+P351+P338, P319, P321, P332+P317, P337+P317, P362+P364, P403+P233, P405, P501
- Except where otherwise noted, data are given for materials in their standard state (at 25 °C [77 °F], 100 kPa). verify (what is ?) Infobox references

Tetrakis(acetonitrile)copper(I) hexafluorophosphate is a salt with the formula [Cu(CH_{3}CN)_{4}]PF_{6}. It is a colourless solid that is used in the synthesis of other copper complexes. The cation [Cu(CH_{3}CN)_{4}]^{+} is a well-known example of a transition metal nitrile complex.

== Structure ==
As confirmed by X-ray crystallographic studies, the copper(I) ion is coordinated to four almost linear acetonitrile ligands in a nearly ideal tetrahedral geometry. Similar complexes with other anions including the perchlorate, tetrafluoroborate, and nitrate are known.

== Synthesis ==
The cation was first reported in 1923 with a nitrate anion as a byproduct of the reduction of silver nitrate with a suspension of copper powder in acetonitrile. [Cu(CH_{3}CN)_{4}]PF_{6} is generally produced by the addition of HPF_{6} to a suspension of copper(I) oxide in acetonitrile:

Cu_{2}O + 2 HPF_{6} + 8 CH_{3}CN → 2 [Cu(CH_{3}CN)_{4}]PF_{6} + H_{2}O

The reaction is highly exothermic, and may bring the solution to a boil. Upon crystallization, the resulting microcrystals should be white, though a blue tinge is common, indicating the presence of Cu^{2+} impurities.

== Reactions and applications ==
The acetonitrile ligands protect the Cu^{+} ion from oxidation to Cu^{2+}, but are rather poorly bound: with other counterions, the complex forms di- and tri-acetonitrilo complexes and is also a useful source of unbound Cu(I).

Water-immiscible organic nitriles have been shown to selectively extract Cu(I) from aqueous chloride solutions. Through this method, copper can be separated from a mixture of other metals. Dilution of acetonitrile solutions with water induces disproportionation:

2 [Cu(CH_{3}CN)_{4}]^{+} + 6 H_{2}O → [Cu(H_{2}O)_{6}]^{2+} + Cu + 8 CH_{3}CN

== See also ==
- Tetrakis(acetonitrile)copper(I) tetrafluoroborate
