= Tetrakis(acetonitrile)copper(I) tetrafluoroborate =

Identifiers
CAS Number	15418-29-8
3D model (JSmol)	Interactive image
ChemSpider	9165868
EC Number	672-614-2
PubChem CID	10990673
CompTox Dashboard (EPA)	DTXSID80451051
- InChI: InChI=1S/4C2H3N.BF4.Cu/c4*1-2-3;2-1(3,4)5;/h4*1H3;;/q;;;;-1;+1 Key: YZGSKMIIVMCEFE-UHFFFAOYSA-N
- SMILES: [B-](F)(F)(F)F.CC#N.CC#N.CC#N.CC#N.[Cu+]

Properties
Chemical formula	C_{8}H_{12}BCuF_{4}N_{4}
Molar mass	314.56 g·mol^{−1}

Hazards
- GHS labelling
Pictograms	(GHS05: Corrosive)
Signal word	Danger
Hazard statements	H314
Precautionary statements	P260, P264, P280, P301+P330+P331, P302+P361+P354, P304+P340, P305+P354+P338, P316, P321, P363, P405, P501

Related compounds
Other anions	Tetrakis(acetonitrile)copper(I) hexafluorophosphate
- Except where otherwise noted, data are given for materials in their standard state (at 25 °C [77 °F], 100 kPa). Infobox references

Tetrakis(acetonitrile)copper(I) tetrafluoroborate is a complex compound of copper with acetonitrile as the ligand and tetrafluoroborate as the counterion.

== Structure ==
Tetrakis(acetonitrile)copper(I) tetrafluoroborate forms colorless crystals in the orthorhombic crystal system in the space group Pna21 with the lattice parameters a = 23.882 Å; b = 8.3285 Å; c = 20.338 Å, and twelve unit cells. The compound is isomorphous with tetrakis(acetonitrile)copper(I) perchlorate and tetrakis(acetonitrile)silver(I) perchlorate.

== Preparation ==
Tetrakis(acetonitrile)copper(I) tetrafluoroborate can be prepared starting from nitrosyl tetrafluoroborate according to the following equation:

Cu + NOBF_{4} + 4 CH_{3}CN → [Cu(CH_{3}CN)_{4}]BF_{4} + NO

The conversion appears to occur in two stages, initially producing a green-blue copper(II) complex. This complex is reduced to the colorless copper(I) complex by further treatment with metallic copper.

== Reactions ==
Tetrakis(acetonitrile)copper(I) tetrafluoroborate reacts with methoxyisobutyl isonitrile to produce tetrakis(methoxyisobutylisonitrile)copper(I) tetrafluoroborate:

[Cu(CH_{3}CN)_{4}]BF_{4} + 4 CH_{3}O(CH_{3})_{2}CCH_{2}NC → [Cu(CH_{3}O(CH_{3})_{2}CCH_{2}NC)_{4}]BF_{4} + 4 CH_{3}CN

[Cu(CH_{3}O(CH_{3})_{2}CCH_{2}NC)_{4}]BF_{4} is used to produce technetium(^{99m}Tc)-sestamibi, which is of commercial value.
