= Magnetic 2D materials =

Class of atomically thin materials

Magnetic 2D materials or magnetic van der Waals materials are two-dimensional materials that display ordered magnetic properties such as ferromagnetism or antiferromagnetism. After the discovery of graphene in 2004, the family of (regular) 2D materials has grown rapidly, and since 2016 there have been numerous reports of 2D magnetic materials that can be exfoliated with ease, similarly to graphene.

The first few-layered van der Waals magnetism was reported in 2017 (in Cr_{2}Ge_{2}Te_{6} and CrI_{3}). One reason for this seemingly late discovery is that thermal fluctuations tend to destroy magnetic order for 2D magnets more easily compared to 3D bulk magnets (regular magnets). It is also generally accepted in the community that low dimensional materials have different magnetic properties compared to bulk materials. This academic interest that transition from 3D to 2D magnetism can be measured has been the driving force behind much of the recent works on van der Waals magnets. Much anticipated transition of such has been since observed in both antiferromagnets and ferromagnets: FePS_{3}, Cr_{2}Ge_{2}Te_{6}, CrI_{3}, NiPS_{3}, MnPS_{3}, Fe_{3}GeTe_{2}

Although the field has been only around since 2016, it has become one of the most active fields in condensed matter physics and materials science and engineering. There have been several review articles written to highlight its future and promise.

== Overview ==
Magnetic van der Waals materials are a new addition to the growing list of 2D materials. The special feature of these new materials is that they exhibit a magnetic ground state, either ferromagnetic or antiferromagnetic, when they are thinned down to very few sheets or even one layer of materials. Another, probably more important, feature of these materials is that they can be easily produced in few layers or monolayer form using simple means such as scotch tape, which is rather uncommon among other magnetic materials like oxide magnets. Mechanical exfoliation has become the default approach for creating 2D materials from bulk crystals, especially since it is difficult to grow 2D magnetic materials from seed crystals. However, although exfoliation produces excellent samples and permits direct examination of the inherent magnetic characteristics of 2D magnets, this method requires considerable time and effort.

Interest in these materials is based on the possibility of producing two-dimensional magnetic materials with ease. The field started with a series of papers in 2016 with a conceptual paper and a first experimental demonstration. The field was expanded further with the publication of similar observations in ferromagnetism the following year. Since then, several new materials discovered and several review papers have been published. The field now includes diverse ferromagnets, antiferromagnets, and more complex orders, some with room-temperature stability such as VSe_{2} and MnCO_{3}.

== Theory ==
Magnetic materials have their spins aligned over a macroscopic length scale. Alignment of the spins is typically driven by exchange interaction between neighboring spins. While at absolute zero ($T = 0$) the alignment can always exist, thermal fluctuations misalign magnetic moments at temperatures above the Curie temperature ($T_C$), causing a phase transition to a non-magnetic state. Whether $T_C$ is above the absolute zero depends heavily on the dimensions of the system.

For a 3D system, the Curie temperature is always above zero, while a one-dimensional system can only be in a ferromagnetic state at $T = 0$

For 2D systems, the transition temperature depends on the spin dimensionality ($n$). In system with $n = 1$, the planar spins can be oriented either in or out of plane. A spin dimensionality of two means that the spins are free to point in any direction parallel to the plane. A system with a spin dimensionality of three means there are no constraints on the direction of the spin. A system with $n = 1$ is described by the 2D Ising model. Onsager's solution to the model demonstrates that $T_C > 0$, thus allowing magnetism at obtainable temperatures. On the contrary, an infinite system where $n = 3$, described by the isotropic Heisenberg model, does not display magnetism at any finite temperature. The long range ordering of the spins for an infinite system is prevented by the Mermin-Wagner theorem stating that spontaneous symmetry breaking required for magnetism is not possible in isotropic two dimensional magnetic systems. Spin waves in this case have finite density of states and are gapless and are therefore easy to excite, destroying magnetic order. Therefore, an external source of magnetocrystalline anisotropy, such as external magnetic field, or a finite-sized system is required for materials with $n = 3$ to demonstrate magnetism.

The 2D ising model describes the behavior of FePS_{3}, CrI_{3}. and Fe_{3}GeTe_{2}, while Cr_{2}Ge_{2}Te_{6} and MnPS_{3} behaves like isotropic Heisenberg model. The intrinsic anisotropy in CrI_{3} and Fe_{3}GeTe_{2} is caused by strong spin–orbit coupling, allowing them to remain magnetic down to a monolayer, while Cr_{2}Ge_{2}Te_{6} has only exhibit magnetism as a bilayer or thicker. The XY model describes the case where $n = 2$. In this system, there is no transition between the ordered and unordered states, but instead the system undergoes a so-called Kosterlitz–Thouless transition at finite temperature $T_{KT}$, where at temperatures below $T_{KT}$ the system has quasi-long-range magnetic order. It was reported that the theoretical predictions of the XY model are consistent with those experimental observations of NiPS_{3.} The Heisenberg model describes the case where $n = 3$. In this system, there is no transition between the ordered and unordered states because of the Mermin-Wagner theorem. The experimental realization of the Heisenberg model was reported using MnPS_{3}.

The above systems can be described by a generalized Heisenberg spin Hamiltonian:

$$H = -\frac{1}{2} \sum_{<i,j>} (J \mathbf{S}_i \cdot \mathbf{S}_j + \Lambda S_j^z S_i^z) - \sum_{i} A(S_i^z)^2$$,

Where $J$ is the exchange coupling between spins $\mathbf{S}_i$ and $\mathbf{S}_j$, and $A$ and $\Lambda$ are on-site and inter-site magnetic anisotropies, respectively. Setting $A \rightarrow \pm\infty$ recovered the 2D Ising model and the XY model. (positive sign for $n = 1$ and negative for $n = 2$), while $A \approx 0$ and $\Lambda \approx 0$ recovers the Heisenberg model ($n = 3$). Along with the idealized models described above, the spin Hamiltonian can be used for most experimental setups, and it can also model dipole-dipole interactions by renormalization of the parameter $A$. However, sometimes including further neighbours or using different exchange coupling, such as antisymmetric exchange, is required.

== Measuring two-dimensional magnetism ==
Magnetic properties of two-dimensional materials are usually measured using Raman spectroscopy, Magneto-optic Kerr effect, Magnetic circular dichroism or Anomalous Hall effect techniques. The dimensionality of the system can be determined by measuring the scaling behaviour of magnetization ($M$), susceptibility ($\chi$) or correlation length ($\xi$) as a function of temperature. The corresponding critical exponents are $\beta$, $\gamma$ and $v$ respectively. They can be retrieved by fitting

$$M(T)\propto(1-T/T_{\text{C}})^{\beta}$$,
$\chi(T)\propto(1-T/T_{\text{C}})^{-\gamma}$ or
$$\xi(T)\propto(1-T/T_{\text{C}})^{-v}$$

to the data. The critical exponents depend on the system and its dimensionality, as demonstrated in Table 1. Therefore, an abrupt change in any of the critical exponents indicates a transition between two models. Furthermore, the Curie temperature can be measured as a function of number of layers ($N$). This relation for a large $N$ is given by

$$T_{\text{C}}(N)/T_{\text{C}}^{\text{3D}} = 1 - (C/N)^{\frac{1}{v}}$$,

where $C$ is a material dependent constant. For thin layers, the behavior changes to $T_{\text{C}} \propto N$

Table 1: Critical exponents for two and three dimensional Ising models
Model	$\beta$	$\gamma$	$v$
2D Ising	0.125	1.75	1
3D Ising	0.3265	1.237	0.630

== Tuning 2D magnetic properties ==
Owing to the weak interlayer van der Waals interactions, the magnetic properties of 2D magnets can be readily tuned through multiple external influences including applied fields, chemical doping, mechanical strain, and many more methods.

Electrical modulation

Applying an external electrical field through electrostatic gating or ionic-liquid gating allows carrier density, orbital occupancy, and band structure to be tuned in 2D magnets. Since magnetic exchange interactions and anisotropy depend sensitively on the electronic structure, gating can modulate the magnetic ground state and key properties such as coercivity, saturation, magnetization, and Curie temperature.

This approach has been demonstrated in several van der Waals magnets. In CrI_{3}, electrostatic doping alters magnetic order in both monolayer and bilayer forms. Switching between ferromagnetic and antiferromagnetic states is made possible in the bilayer form since it is able to reverse the sign of interlayer exchange. Carrier tuning in Cr_{2}Ge_{2}Te_{6} produces similar modulation of magnetic hysteresis and moment while ionic-liquid gates achieve higher carrier densities that enhance ferromagnetic ordering and reorient the easy axis. Solid state protonic gating extends this strategy to materials such as Fe_{5}GeTe_{2}, where larger electron doping can drive transitions between ferro- and antiferro- phases.

Optical field

Optical excitation offers a non contact method for tuning magnetism in 2D materials by inducing photothermal effects and photo-doping that alters the electronic structure and magnetic exchange in the material. In few layered Fe_{3}GeTe_{2}, femtosecond laser pulses have been shown to enhance saturation magnetization, reduce coercivity, and even stabilize ferromagnetism at room temperature. This stabilization occurs through photo-generated carriers that increase the density of states and also weaken the magnetic anisotropy. Light has also been shown to drive deterministic switching of magnetic order, as CrI_{3} excited with circularly polarized pulses enables the selective reversal of magnetization with thresholds that depend on the pulse energy and polarization.

Mechanical regulation (pressure and strain)

Mechanical deformation through applied pressure or strain offers another pathway for tuning magnetism in 2D materials by modifying lattice parameters, interlayer spacing, and stacking order. These modifications all strongly influence the exchange interactions and magnetic anisotropy of the material. In CrI_{3}, hydrostatic pressures of a few gigapascals can reversible or irreversibly alter stacking configurations leading to transitions in magnetic order. While it is seen that hydrostatic pressure can lead to a 2x increase in magnetic coupling between material layers, it is difficult to apply precise pressure on the atomically thin layers.

Strain engineering provides a complimentary approach to pressure applications. Tensile or compressive strain in materials such as Fe3GeTe2 significantly modifies coercivity, hysteresis, and Curie temperature by altering magnetic anisotropy energy through changes in orbital moment and spin-orbit coupling. Similar effects have been reported in strained or wrinkled Cr_{2}Ge_{2}Te_{6} films, where enhanced Curie temperatures arise from the effects of inducing strain.

Chemical doping

Chemical doping provides a robust means of tuning magnetic properties of 2D magnets via elemental substitutions and adjustments to stoichiometric ratios. In the Fe-Ge-Te family variations in iron content strongly affect the Curie temperature, coercivity, and magnetic ground state. This allows iron rich compositions like Fe_{5}GeTe_{2} to exhibit near room temperature ferromagnetism and complex multi-stage magnetic transitions. Further tunability can be achieved by substituting the metals that comprise these 2D materials. Cobalt or nickel doping in Fe_{5}GeTe_{2} can reorient magnetic anisotropy, induce antiferro- or ferro- phases, and raise the Curie temperatures above 300-400K. In Cr_{(1+δ)}Te_{2}, Cr intercalation δ = 1/3 increased the Curie temperature of CrTe_{2} (δ = 0) from 125 K to 325 K in Cr_{2}Te_{3} and changed easy axis of magnetization from out-of-plane to in-plane.

Non-magnetic substitutions like gallium or arsenic also modifies exchange interactions, enabling large increases in Curie temperatures and changes in magnetic anisotropy. Similar strategies apply beyond the Fe-Ge-Te system, as theoretical and experimental work shows that substituting transition metal or halogen sites in CrI_{3}, CrGeTe_{3}, or CrCl_{3} can substantially shift their magnetic transition temperatures.

== Applications ==
Magnetic 2D materials can be used as a part of van der Waals heterostructures. They are layered materials consisting of different 2D materials held together by van der Waals forces. One example of such structure is a thin insulating/semiconducting layer between layers of 2D magnetic material, producing a magnetic tunnel junction. This structure can have significant spin valve effect, and thus they can have many applications in the field of spintronics. Another newly emerging direction came from the rather unexpected observation of magnetic exciton in NiPS_{3.}
