= Chromium(IV) chloride =

Chemical compound

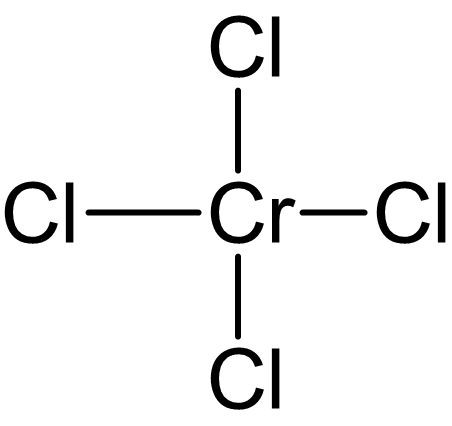

Identifiers
CAS Number	15597-88-3
3D model (JSmol)	Interactive image
ChemSpider	20569074
PubChem CID	177612
CompTox Dashboard (EPA)	DTXSID30166007
- InChI: InChI=1S/4ClH.Cr/h4*1H;/q;;;;+4/p-4 Key: FVIAFAGQDQRRCD-UHFFFAOYSA-J; InChI=1/4ClH.Cr/h4*1H;/q;;;;+4/p-4 Key: FVIAFAGQDQRRCD-XBHQNQODAT
- SMILES: [Cl-].[Cl-].[Cl-].[Cl-].[Cr+4]

Properties
Chemical formula	CrCl_{4}
Molar mass	193.807 g/mol
Melting point	Decomposes above −80 °C (−112 °F)
- Except where otherwise noted, data are given for materials in their standard state (at 25 °C [77 °F], 100 kPa). verify (what is ?) Infobox references

Chromium(IV) chloride is an unstable compound of chromium and chlorine with the chemical formula CrCl_{4}. It is generated by combining chromium(III) chloride and chlorine gas at elevated temperatures, but reverts to those substances at room temperature.
