= Chromium(IV) fluoride =

Chemical substance

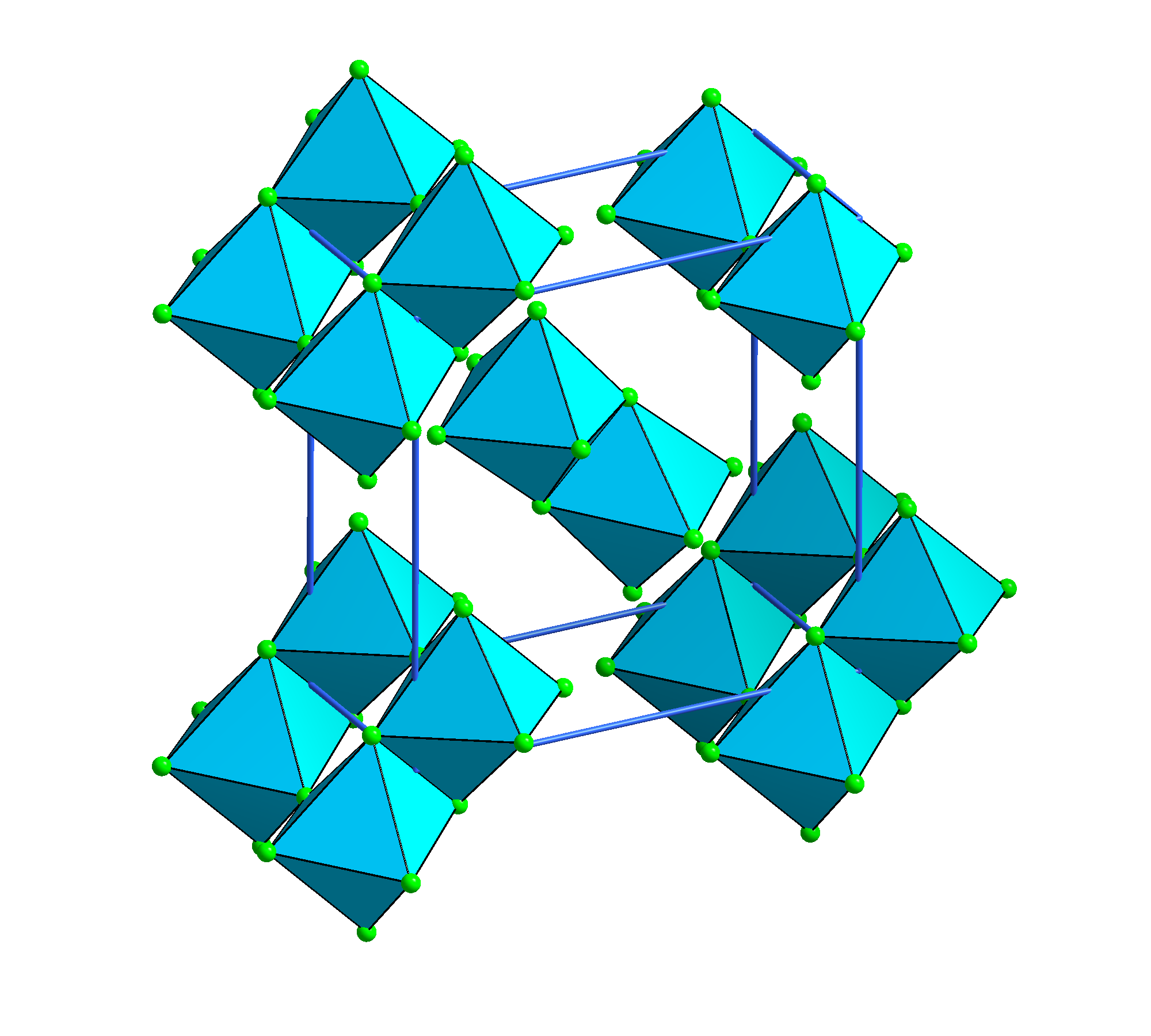

Names
- IUPAC name Chromium(IV) fluoride
- Other names Chromium fluoride, Chromium tetrafluoride

Identifiers
CAS Number	10049-11-3
3D model (JSmol)	Interactive image
ChemSpider	52082975
PubChem CID	57346073
UNII	LXA70EM86D
CompTox Dashboard (EPA)	DTXSID90721095
- InChI: InChI=1S/Cr.4FH/h;4*1H/q+4;;;;/p-4 Key: SYJRAUIOIRVQSW-UHFFFAOYSA-J
- SMILES: [Cr+4].[F-].[F-].[F-].[F-]

Properties
Chemical formula	CrF_{4}
Molar mass	127.9897 g·mol^{−1}
Appearance	green crystals, amorphous brown beads
Density	2.89 g/cm^{3}
Melting point	277 °C (531 °F; 550 K)
Boiling point	~ 400 °C (752 °F; 673 K)
Solubility in water	reacts with water
- Except where otherwise noted, data are given for materials in their standard state (at 25 °C [77 °F], 100 kPa). Infobox references

Chromium(IV) fluoride is an inorganic compound with the chemical formula CrF_{4}. It has a dark greenish-black color when solid. It rapidly hydrolyzes in presence of moisture in air or directly in water.

== Synthesis ==
When powdered chromium or CrCl_{3} is exposed to fluorine gas at a temperature of 350-500 °C, a mix of CrF_{4} and CrF_{5} is created. Due to hydrolysis, the CrF_{4} settles out as varnish-like brown beads upon cooling.

== Reactions ==
Chromium(IV) fluoride is easily reduced.

It will react with water:

CrF_{4} + 2H_{2}O → CrO_{2} + 4HF
