= Chromium(II) fluoride =

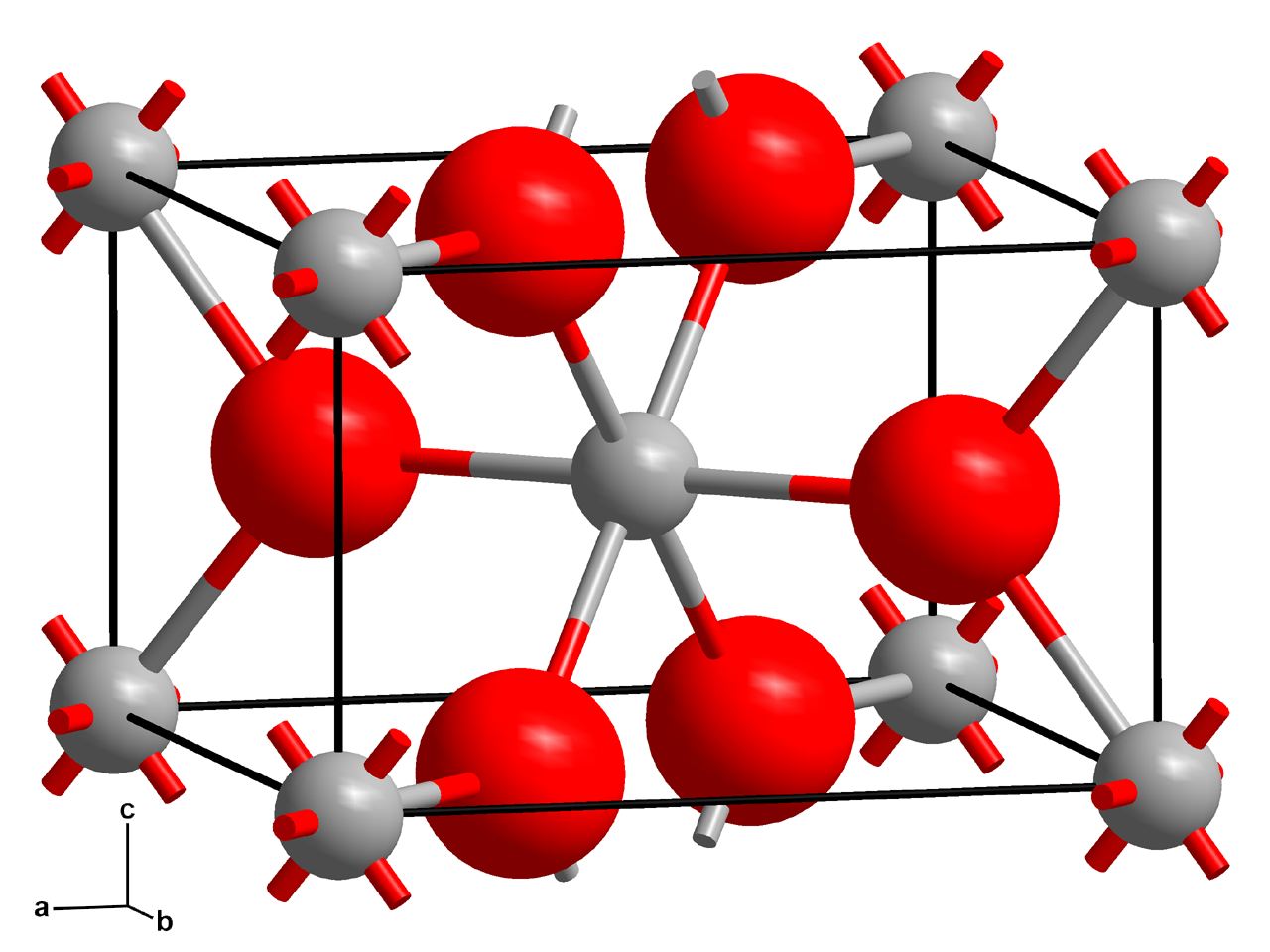
- Cr^{2+} F^{−}

Names
- Other names chromium difluoride, chromium fluouride, chromous fluoride

Identifiers
CAS Number	10049-10-2
3D model (JSmol)	Interactive image
ChemSpider	59614
ECHA InfoCard	100.030.140
EC Number	233-168-0
PubChem CID	66229
UNII	53XZY98IXY
CompTox Dashboard (EPA)	DTXSID30143338
- InChI: InChI=1S/Cr.2FH/h;2*1H/q+2;;/p-2 Key: RNFYGEKNFJULJY-UHFFFAOYSA-L
- SMILES: [F-].[F-].[Cr+2]

Properties
Chemical formula	CrF_{2}
Molar mass	89.9929 g·mol^{−1}
Appearance	blue-green iridescent crystals hygroscopic, turns to Cr_{2}O_{3} when heated in air
Density	3.79 g/cm^{3}
Melting point	894 °C (1,641 °F; 1,167 K)
Boiling point	> 1,300 °C (2,370 °F; 1,570 K)
Solubility in water	76.7 g/100 mL

Structure
Crystal structure	monoclinic

Thermochemistry
Std enthalpy of formation (Δ_{f}H^{⦵}_{298})	−8.645 kJ/g (solid)

Hazards
- GHS labelling
Pictograms	(GHS05: Corrosive) (GHS07: Exclamation mark)
Signal word	Danger
Hazard statements	H314
Precautionary statements	P260, P264, P280, P301+P330+P331, P303+P361+P353, P304+P340, P305+P351+P338, P310, P321, P363, P405, P501

Related compounds
Other anions	Chromium(II) chloride; Chromium(II) bromide; Chromium(II) iodide
Related compounds	Chromyl fluoride
- Except where otherwise noted, data are given for materials in their standard state (at 25 °C [77 °F], 100 kPa). Infobox references

Chromium(II) fluoride is an inorganic compound with the formula CrF_{2}. It exists as a blue-green iridescent solid. Chromium(II) fluoride is sparingly soluble in water, almost insoluble in alcohol, and is soluble in boiling hydrochloric acid, but is not attacked by hot distilled sulfuric acid or nitric acid. Like other chromous compounds, chromium(II) fluoride is oxidized to chromium(III) oxide in air.

== Preparation and structure ==
The compound is prepared by passing anhydrous hydrogen fluoride over anhydrous chromium(II) chloride. The reaction will proceed at room temperature but is typically heated to 100-200 °C to ensure completion:

CrCl_{2} + 2 HF → CrF_{2} + 2 HCl

Like many difluorides, CrF_{2} adopts a structure like rutile with octahedral molecular geometry about Cr(II) and trigonal geometry at F^{−}. Two of the six Cr–F bonds are long at 2.43 Å, and four are short near 2.00 Å. This distortion is a consequence of the Jahn–Teller effect that arises from the d^{4} electron configuration of the chromium(II) ion.
