= Transition metal nitrile complexes =

Class of coordination compounds containing nitrile ligands (coordinating via N)

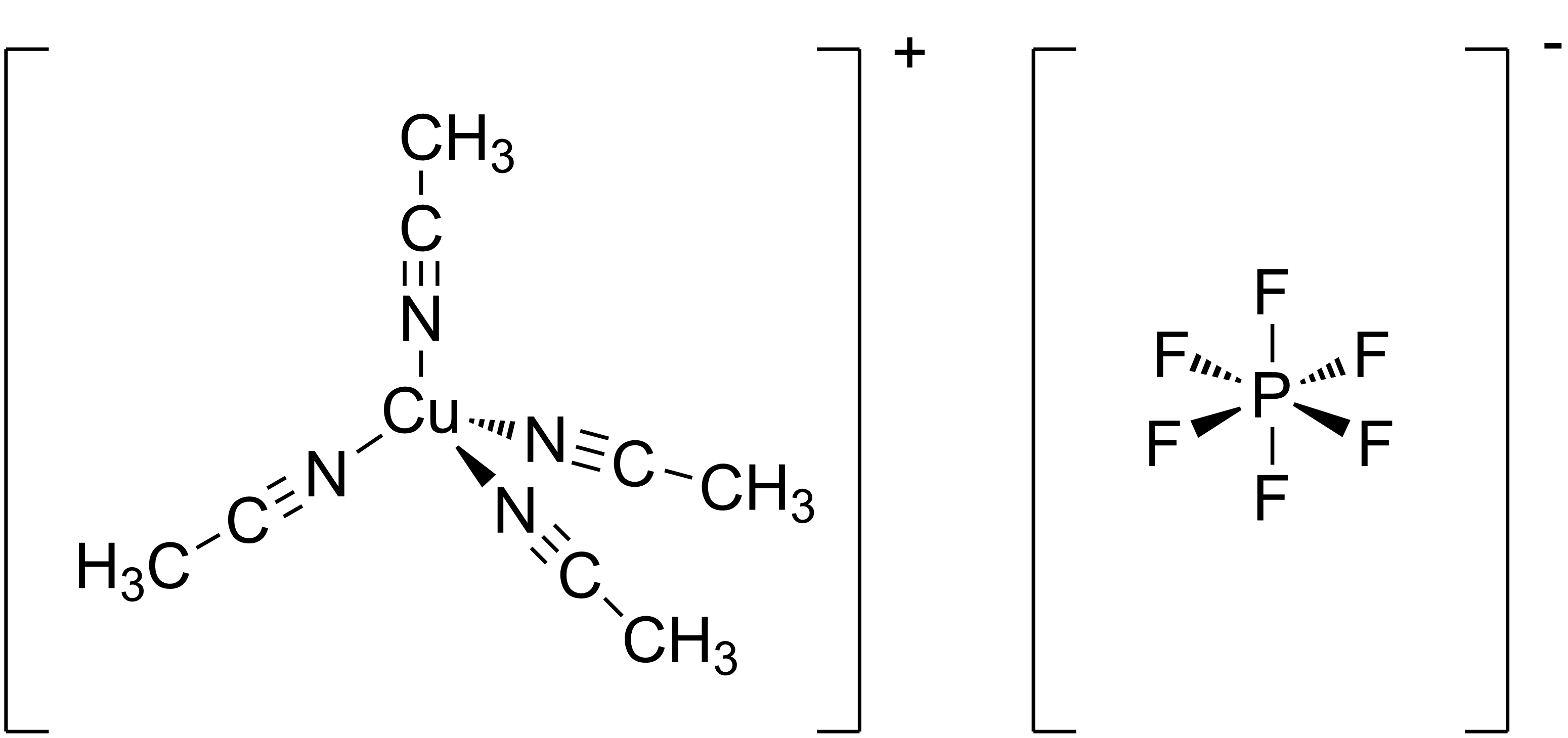
[Cu(MeCN)_{4}]^{+}, often encountered as its PF_{6}^{−} salt, is a common transition metal nitrile complex.

Transition metal nitrile complexes are coordination compounds containing nitrile ligands. Because nitriles are weakly basic, the nitrile ligands in these complexes are often labile.

== Ligand properties ==
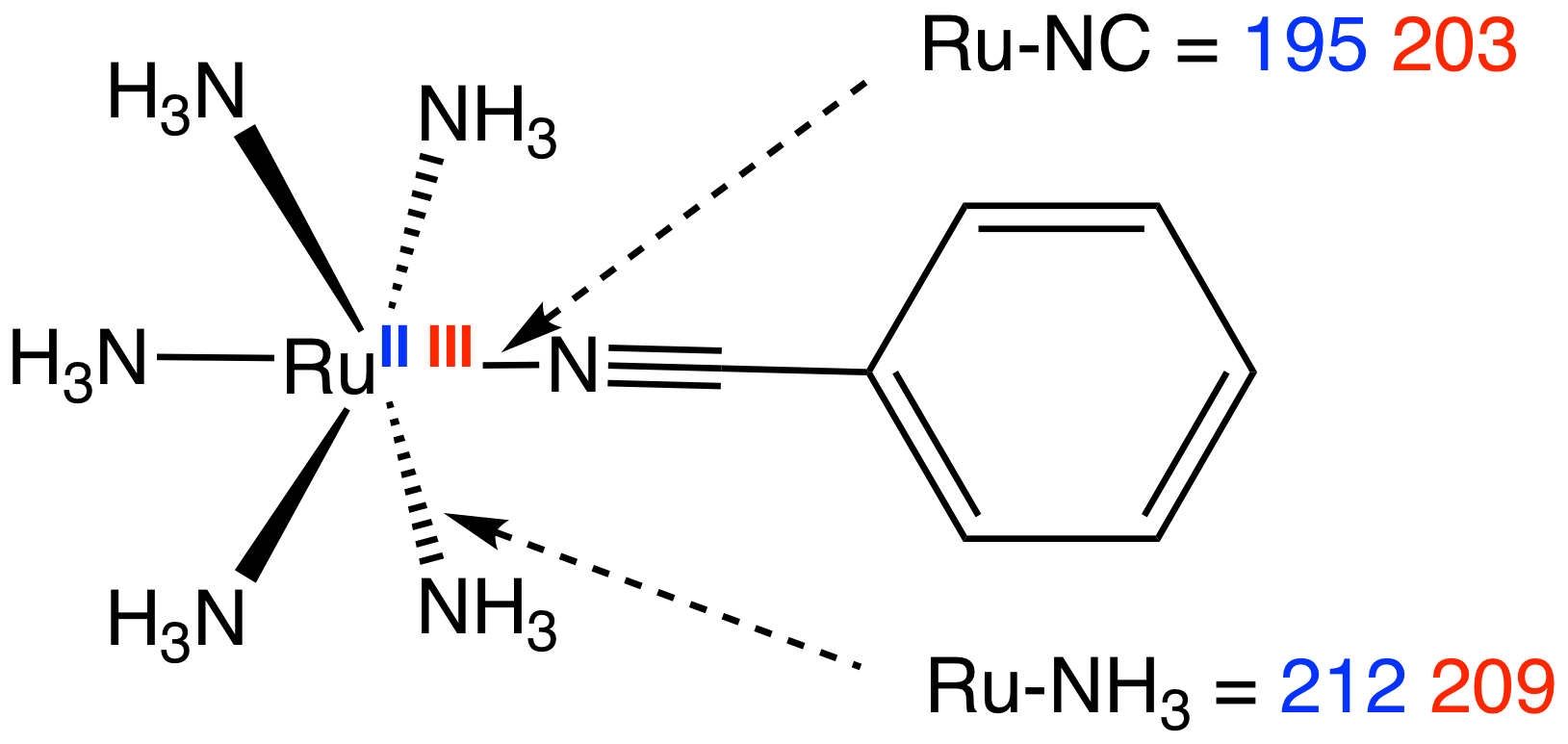
Structural comparisons of [Ru(NH_{3})_{5}(NCPh)]^{n+} for 2+ and 3+ salts (distance in picometers)

According to the Covalent bond classification method, nitriles are classified as L ligands, i.e., charge-neutral Lewis bases. With respect to HSAB theory, they are classified as soft.

Typical nitrile ligands are acetonitrile, propionitrile, and benzonitrile. The structures of [Ru(NH_{3})_{5}(NCPh)]^{n+} have been determined for the 2+ and 3+ oxidation states. Upon oxidation the Ru-NH_{3} distances contract and the Ru-NCPh distances elongate, consistent with amines serving as pure-sigma donor ligands and nitriles functioning as pi-acceptors.

== Synthesis and reactions ==
Acetonitrile, propionitrile and benzonitrile are also popular solvents. Because nitrile solvents have high dielectric constants, cationic complexes containing a nitrile ligand are often soluble in a solution of that nitrile.

Some complexes can be prepared by dissolving an anhydrous metal salt in the nitrile. In other cases, a suspension of the metal is oxidized with a solution of NOBF_{4} in the nitrile:

Ni + 6 MeCN + 2 NOBF_{4} → [Ni(MeCN)_{6}](BF_{4})_{2} + 2 NO

Heteroleptic complexes of molybdenum and tungsten can be synthesized from their respective hexacarbonyl complexes.

M(CO)_{6} + 4 MeCN + 2 NOBF_{4} → [M(NO)_{2}(MeCN)_{4}](BF_{4})_{2}

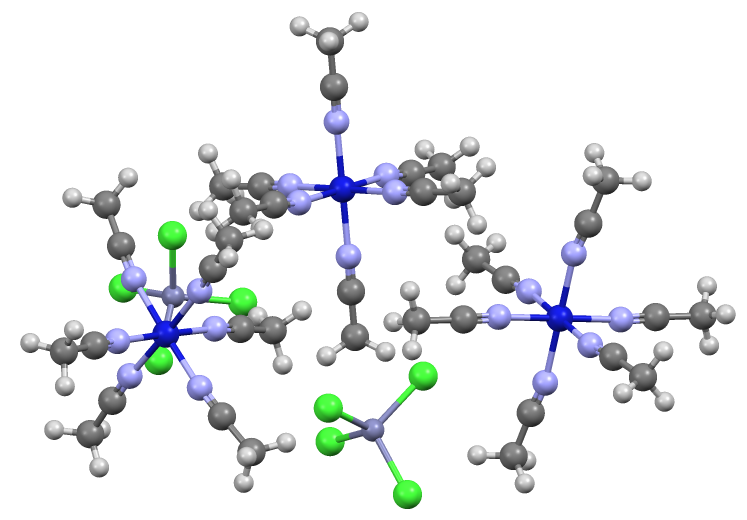
Portion of the structure of the tetrachlorozincate (ZnCl_{4}^{2−}) salt of [Ni(MeCN)_{6}]^{2+}

For the synthesis of some acetonitrile complexes, the nitrile serves as a reductant. This method is illustrated by the conversion of molybdenum pentachloride to the molybdenum(IV) complex:

2 MoCl_{5} + 5 CH_{3}CN → 2 MoCl_{4}(CH_{3}CN)_{2} + ClCH_{2}CN + HCl

=== Reactions ===
Transition metal nitrile complexes are usually employed because the nitrile ligand is labile and relatively chemically inert. Cationic nitrile complexes are however susceptible to nucleophilic attack at carbon. Consequently some nitrile complexes catalyze the hydrolysis of nitriles to give the amides.

Fe- and Co-nitrile complexes are intermediates in nitrile hydratase enzymes. N-coordination activates the sp-hybridized carbon center toward attack by nucleophiles, including water. Thus coordination of the nitrile to a cationic metal center is the basis for the catalytic hydration:

M-NCR + H_{2}O → M-O=C(NH_{2})R
M-O=C(NH_{2})R + NCR → O=C(NH_{2})R + M-NCR

In a related reaction, alcohols add to nitrile ligands.

Nitrile ligands in electron-rich complexes are susceptible to oxidation, e.g. by iodosylbenzene. Nitriles undergo coupling with alkynes, also involving electron-rich complexes.

== Examples ==
=== [M(NCMe)_{6}]^{n+} ===
- Hexakis(acetonitrile)vanadium(II) tetrachlorozincate ([V(MeCN)_{6}](ZnCl_{4})), green
- Hexakis(acetonitrile)chromium(II) bis(tetraphenylborate) ([Cr(MeCN)_{6}](B(C_{6}H_{5})_{4})_{2}), green
- Hexakis(acetonitrile)chromium(III) tetrafluoroborate ([Cr(MeCN)_{6}](BF_{4})_{3})), white
- Hexakis(acetonitrile)iron(II) bis(tetrakis(pentafluorophenyl)borate) ([Fe(MeCN)_{6}](B(C_{6}F_{5})_{4})_{2}), orange
- Hexakis(acetonitrile)cobalt(II) bis(tetrakis(pentafluorophenyl)borate) ([Co(MeCN)_{6}](B(C_{6}F_{5})_{4})_{2}), purple
- Hexakis(acetonitrile)nickel(II) tetrafluoroborate ([Ni(MeCN)_{6}](BF_{4})_{2}), blue
- Hexakis(acetonitrile)copper(II) bis(tetrakis(pentafluorophenyl)borate) ([Cu(MeCN)_{6}](B(C_{6}F_{5})_{4})_{2}, pale blue-green solid
- Hexakis(acetonitrile)ruthenium(II) tetrafluoroborate ([Ru(MeCN)_{6}](BF_{4})_{2}), white, d_{Ru-N} = 202 pm.
- Hexakis(acetonitrile)rhodium(III) tetrafluoroborate ([Rh(MeCN)_{6}](BF_{4})_{3}), a yellow solid.
- Hexakis(acetonitrile)rhenium(II) tetrafluoroborate ([Re(MeCN)_{6}](BF_{4})_{2}), a yellow solid.
- Hexakis(acetonitrile)rhenium(III) tetrafluoroborate ([Re(MeCN)_{6}](BF_{4})_{3}), a brown solid.

=== [M(NCMe)_{4}]^{n+} ===
- [Cr(MeCN)_{4}](BF_{4})_{2}, blue
- [Cu(MeCN)_{4}]PF_{6}, colorless
- [Pd(MeCN)_{4}](BF_{4})_{2}, yellow

=== [M(NCMe)_{4 or 5}]_{2}^{n+} ===
- [Mo_{2}(MeCN)_{8/10}](BF_{4})_{4} blue d(Mo-Mo) = 218, d(Mo-N)_{axial} = 260, d(Mo-N)_{equat} = 214 pm
- [Tc_{2}(MeCN)_{10}](BF_{4})_{4}
- [Re_{2}(MeCN)_{10}][B(C_{6}H_{3}(CF_{3})_{2})_{4}]_{2}, blue; d(Re-Re) = 226, d(Re-N)_{axial} = 240, d(Re-N)_{equat} = 205 pm
- [Rh_{2}(MeCN)_{10}](BF_{4})_{4}, orange; d(Rh-Rh) = 261, d(Rh-N)_{axial} = 219, d(Rh-N)_{equat} = 198 pm

=== [M(NCMe)_{2}]^{+} ===
- [Ag(MeCN)_{2}]B(C_{6}H_{3}(CF_{3})_{2})_{4}
- [Au(MeCN)_{2}]SbF_{6}

== Mixed ligand examples ==
- Bis(benzonitrile)palladium dichloride (PdCl_{2}(PhCN)_{2}), an orange solid that serves as a source of "PdCl_{2}"
- Tricarbonyltris(propionitrile)molybdenum(0) (Mo(CO)_{3}(C_{2}H_{5}CN)_{3}), a source of "Mo(CO)_{3}". Related Cr and W complexes are known.

== Complexes of η^{2}-nitrile ligands ==
Cases are known where nitriles function as η^{2}-ligands. This bonding mode is more common for complexes of low-valence metals, such as Ni(0). Complexes of η^{2}-nitriles are expected to form as transient intermediates in certain metal-catalyzed reactions of nitriles, such as the Hoesch reaction and the hydrogenation of nitriles. In some cases, η^{2}-nitrile ligands are intermediates that preceded oxidative addition.

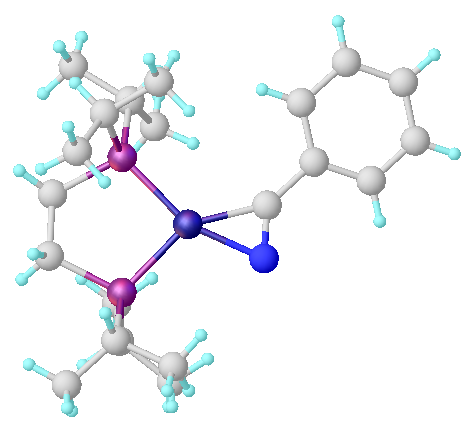
Structure of Ni(diphosphine)(η^{2}-PhCN)

== See also ==
- Cyanometalate – coordination compounds containing cyanide ligands (coordinating via C).
