= Chromium(III) bromide =

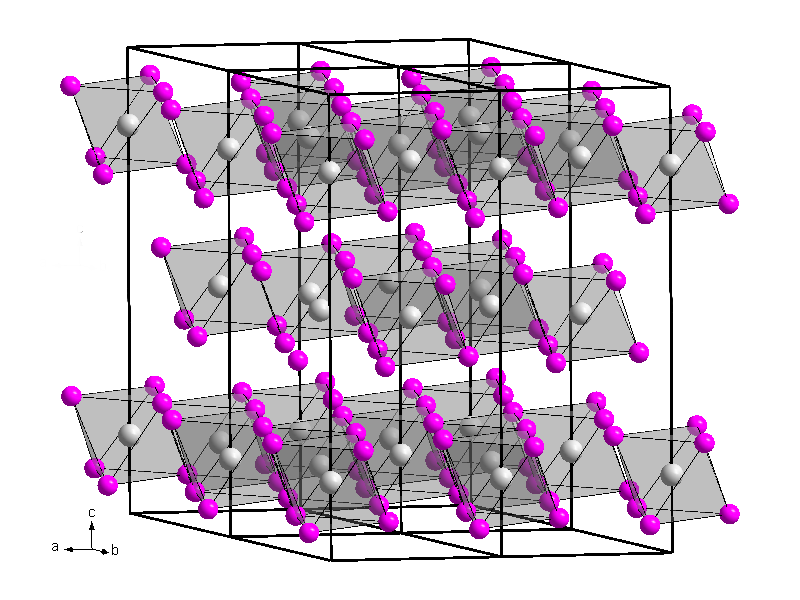

Names
- IUPAC name Chromium(III) bromide
- Other names: Chromic bromide; Chromium bromide; Chromium tribromide

Identifiers
CAS Number	10031-25-1; 13478-06-3 (hexahydrate)
3D model (JSmol)	Interactive image
ChemSpider	74280
ECHA InfoCard	100.030.068
EC Number	233-088-6
PubChem CID	5155129
UNII	WZB719DDER
CompTox Dashboard (EPA)	DTXSID40905343
- InChI: InChI=1S/3BrH.Cr/h3*1H;/q;;;+3/p-3 Key: UZDWIWGMKWZEPE-UHFFFAOYSA-K
- SMILES: [Cr+3].[Br-].[Br-].[Br-]

Properties
Chemical formula	CrBr_{3}
Molar mass	291.708 g·mol^{−1}
Appearance	black lustrous crystals; green in transmitted light; reddish in reflected light
Density	4.25 g/cm^{3}
Melting point	1,130 °C (2,070 °F; 1,400 K) (anhydrous); 79 °C (hexahydrate)
Solubility in water	anhydrous insoluble in cold water soluble with addition of chromium(II) salts soluble in hot water hexahydrate highly soluble

Structure
Crystal structure	trigonal

Hazards
- GHS labelling
Pictograms	(GHS05: Corrosive) (GHS06: Toxic) (GHS08: Health hazard)
Signal word	Danger
Hazard statements	H302+H312, H314, H317, H330, H361
Precautionary statements	P203, P260, P264, P264+P265, P270, P271, P272, P280, P284, P301+P317, P301+P330+P331, P302+P352, P302+P361+P354, P304+P340, P305+P354+P338, P316, P317, P318, P320, P321, P330, P333+P317, P362+P364, P363, P403+P233, P405, P501
- NIOSH (US health exposure limits)
PEL (Permissible)	TWA 1 mg/m^{3}
REL (Recommended)	TWA 0.5 mg/m^{3}
IDLH (Immediate danger)	250 mg/m^{3}
- Except where otherwise noted, data are given for materials in their standard state (at 25 °C [77 °F], 100 kPa). Infobox references

Chromium(III) bromide is an inorganic compound with the chemical formula CrBr_{3}. It is a dark colored solid that appears green in transmitted light but red with reflected light. It is used as a precursor to catalysts for the oligomerization of ethylene.

== Synthesis ==
The compound is prepared in a tube furnace by the reaction of bromine vapor and chromium powder at 1000 °C. It is purified by extracting with absolute diethyl ether to remove any CrBr_{2}, and is subsequently washed with absolute diethyl ether and absolute ethanol.

2Cr + 3Br_{2} → 2CrBr_{3}

The effect of bromine on a highly heated mixture of chromium(III) oxide with charcoal:

Cr_{2}O_{3} + 3Br_{2} + 3C → 2CrBr_{3} + 3CO

== Chemical properties ==
Analogous to the behavior of related chromium(III) halides, the tribromide dissolves in water to give CrBr_{3}(H_{2}O)_{3} only upon the addition of catalytic amounts of a reducing agent. The reducing agent generates chromous bromide on the surface of the solid, which dissolves and re-oxidizes to Cr(III).

Chromium(III) bromide is reduced by hydrogen gas at 350-400 °C to give chromium(II) bromide:

2 CrBr_{3} + H_{2} → 2 CrBr_{2} + 2 HBr

Oxidizes when heated in air:

2 CrBr_{3} + 3 O_{2} → 2 Cr_{2}O_{3} + 6 Br_{2}
