= Tungsten chloride =

Tungsten chloride may refer to:

- Tungsten(II) chloride, WCl_{2}
- Tungsten(III) chloride, WCl_{3}
- Tungsten(IV) chloride, WCl_{4}
- Tungsten(V) chloride, WCl_{5}
- Tungsten(VI) chloride, WCl_{6}
