= Tungsten fluoride =

Tungsten fluoride may refer to:

- Tungsten tetrafluoride (tungsten(IV) fluoride)
- Tungsten pentafluoride (tungsten(V) fluoride)
- Tungsten hexafluoride (tungsten(VI) fluoride)
