= Tungsten bromide =

The tungsten bromides include:

- Tungsten hexabromide, a dark gray powder with formula WBr_{6}
- Tungsten(V) bromide, dark hygroscopic crystals with formula WBr_{5}
