= Tungsten dichloride dioxide =

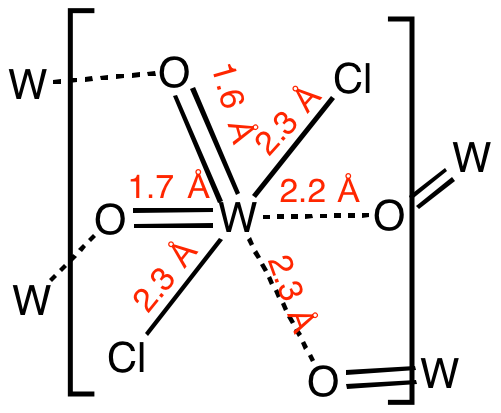
- Tungsten(VI) dioxydichloride

Names
- IUPAC name Tungsten(VI) dichloride dioxide
- Other names: Tungsten(VI) dioxydichloride; Tungsten dichloride dioxide; Tungstyl chloride

Identifiers
CAS Number	13520-76-8
3D model (JSmol)	Interactive image
ChemSpider	10652408
ECHA InfoCard	100.033.496
EC Number	236-862-1
PubChem CID	19092009
CompTox Dashboard (EPA)	DTXSID90894995
- InChI: InChI=1S/2ClH.2O.W/h2*1H;;;/q;;2*-2;/p-2 Key: DVBXMVWZPVBSJY-UHFFFAOYSA-L; InChI=1S/2ClH.2O.W/h2*1H;;;/q;;2*-2;/p-2
- SMILES: [O-2].[O-2].[Cl-].[Cl-].[W]

Properties
Chemical formula	WO_{2}Cl_{2}
Molar mass	286.74 g·mol^{−1}
Appearance	Yellow-red crystals
Density	4.67 g/cm^{3}
Melting point	265 °C (509 °F; 538 K)
Boiling point	Sublimes at > 350 °C in vacuum
Solubility in water	decomposes
Solubility	slightly soluble in ethanol

Structure
Crystal structure	orthorhombic

Hazards
- GHS labelling
Pictograms	(GHS07: Exclamation mark)
Signal word	Warning
Hazard statements	H315, H319, H335

Related compounds
Other anions	Tungsten dibromide dioxide; Tungsten difluoride dioxide; Tungsten diiodide dioxide
Other cations	Molybdenum dichloride dioxide
Related compounds	Chromyl chloride; Tungsten hexachloride; Tungsten(VI) oxytetrachloride; Uranyl chloride
- Except where otherwise noted, data are given for materials in their standard state (at 25 °C [77 °F], 100 kPa). verify (what is ?) Infobox references

Tungsten dichloride dioxide, or tungstyl chloride is the chemical compound with the formula WO_{2}Cl_{2}. It is a yellow solid. It is used as a precursor to other tungsten compounds. Like other tungsten halides, WO_{2}Cl_{2} is sensitive to moisture, undergoing hydrolysis.

== Preparation ==
WO_{2}Cl_{2} is prepared by ligand redistribution reaction from tungsten trioxide and tungsten hexachloride:

2 WO_{3} + WCl_{6} → 3 WO_{2}Cl_{2}

Using a two-zone tube furnace, a vacuum-sealed tube containing these solids is heated to 350 °C. The yellow product sublimes to the cooler end of the reaction tube. No redox occurs in this process. An alternative route highlights the oxophilicity of tungsten:

WCl_{6} + 2 ((CH_{3})_{3}Si)_{2}O → 3 WO_{2}Cl_{2} + 4 (CH_{3})_{3}SiCl

This reaction, like the preceding one, proceeds via the intermediacy of WOCl_{4}.

== Structure ==
Gaseous tungsten dichloride dioxide is a monomer. Solid tungsten dichloride dioxide is a polymer consisting of distorted octahedral W centres. The polymer is characterized by two short W-O distances, typical for a multiple W-O bond, and two long W-O distances more typical of a single or dative W-O bond.

== Related oxyhalides ==
Tungsten forms a number of oxyhalides including WOCl_{4}, WOCl_{3}, WOCl_{2}. The corresponding bromides (WOBr_{4}, WOBr_{3}, WOBr_{2}) are also known as is WO_{2}I_{2}.

== Reactions ==
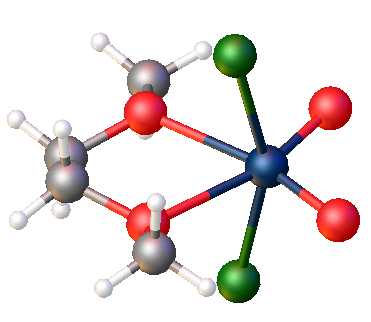
Structure of the complex WO_{2}Cl_{2}(dimethoxyethane).

WO_{2}Cl_{2} is a Lewis acid, forming soluble adducts of the type WO_{2}Cl_{2}L_{2}, where L is a donor ligand such as bipyridine and dimethoxyethane. Such complexes often cannot be prepared by depolymerization of the inorganic solid, but are generated in situ from WOCl_{4}.

WO_{2}Cl_{2} reacts with tetraphenylphosphonium chloride to give (PPh_{4})_{2}W_{2}O_{4}Cl_{6} (Ph = C_{6}H_{5}).
