= Deoxygenation =

Chemical reaction removing oxygen atoms from a molecule

Deoxygenation is a chemical reaction involving the removal of oxygen atoms from a molecule. The term also refers to the removal of molecular oxygen (O_{2}) from gases and solvents, a step in air-free technique and gas purifiers. As applied to organic compounds, deoxygenation is a component of fuels production as well a type of reaction employed in organic synthesis, e.g. of pharmaceuticals.

Compounds with an oxygen atom removed can be described as "desoxy-" or "deoxy-" relative to the original compound, for instance deoxyribose or desoxymescaline.

== Deoxygenation of C-O bonds ==
=== With replacement by H_{2} ===
The main examples involving the replacement of an oxo group by two hydrogen atoms (A=O → AH_{2}) are hydrogenolysis. Typical examples use metal catalysts and H_{2} as the reagent. Conditions are typically more forcing than hydrogenation.

Stoichiometric reactions that effect deoxygenation include the Wolff–Kishner reduction for aryl ketones. The replacement of a hydroxyl group by hydrogen (A-OH → A-H) is the point of the Barton–McCombie deoxygenation and the Markó–Lam deoxygenation.

=== Biomass valorization ===
Deoxygenation is an important goal of the conversion of biomass to useful fuels and chemicals. Partial deoxygenation is effected by dehydration and decarboxylation.

=== Other routes ===
Oxygen groups can also be removed by the reductive coupling of ketones, as illustrated by the McMurry reaction.

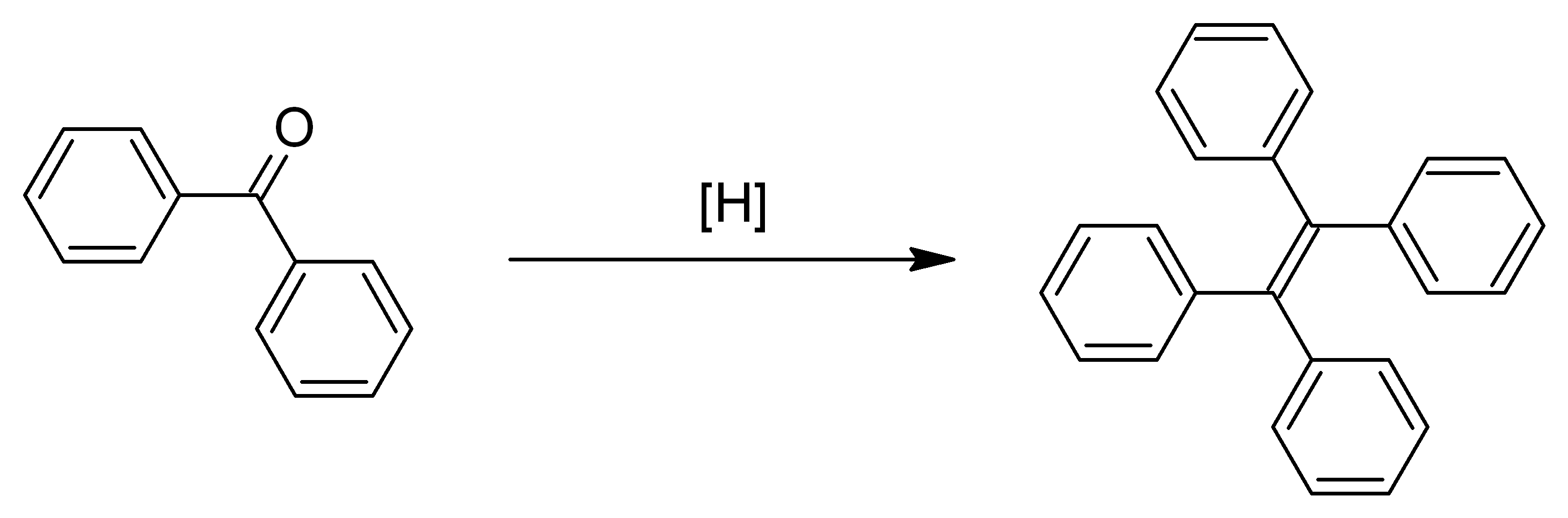

Epoxides can be deoxygenated using the oxophilic reagent produced by combining tungsten hexachloride and n-butyllithium generates the alkene. This reaction can proceed with loss or retention of configuration.

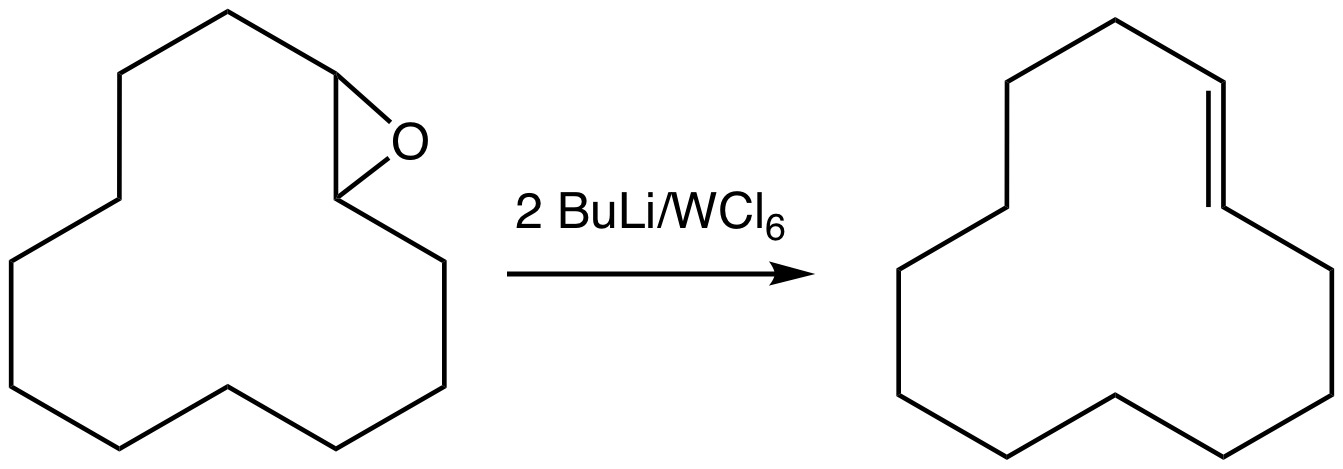
Deoxygenation of trans-cyclododecene oxide, which occurs with retention.

== Deoxygenation of S-O and P-O bonds ==
=== N=O bonds ===
Nitroaromatics are deoxygenated by strongly reducing silyl reagents such as N,N'-bis(trimethylsilyl)-4,4'-bipyridinylidene.

=== P=O bonds ===
Phosphorus occurs in nature as oxides, so to produce elemental form of the element, deoxygenation is required. The main method involves carbothermic reduction (i.e., carbon is the deoxygenation agent).

4 Ca_{5}(PO_{4})_{3}F + 18 SiO_{2} + 30 C → 3 P_{4} + 30 CO + 18 CaSiO_{3} + 2 CaF_{2}

Oxophilic main group compounds are useful reagents for certain deoxygenations conducted on laboratory scale. The highly oxophilic reagent hexachlorodisilane (Si_{2}Cl_{6}) stereospecifically deoxygenates phosphine oxides.

=== S=O bonds ===
A chemical reagent for the deoxygenation of many sulfur and nitrogen oxo compounds is the combination trifluoroacetic anhydride/sodium iodide. For example, in the deoxygenation of the sulfoxide diphenylsulfoxide to the sulfide diphenylsulfide:

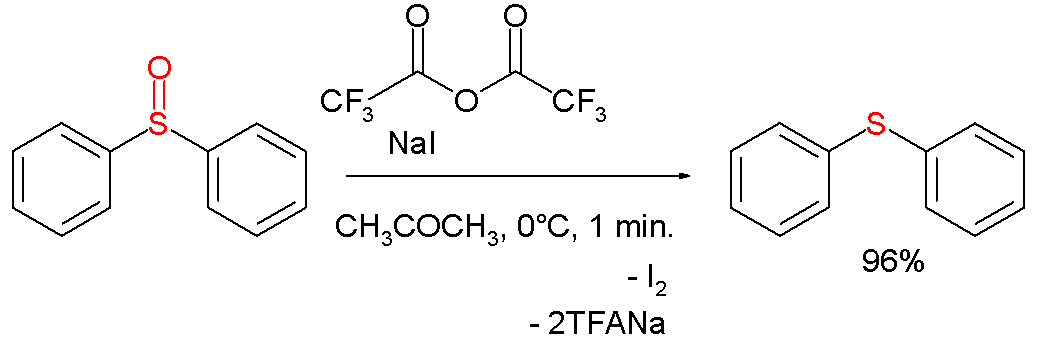

The reaction mechanism is based on the activation of the sulfoxide by a trifluoroacetyl group and oxidation of iodine. Iodine is formed quantitatively in this reaction and therefore the reagent is used for the analytical detection of many oxo compounds.

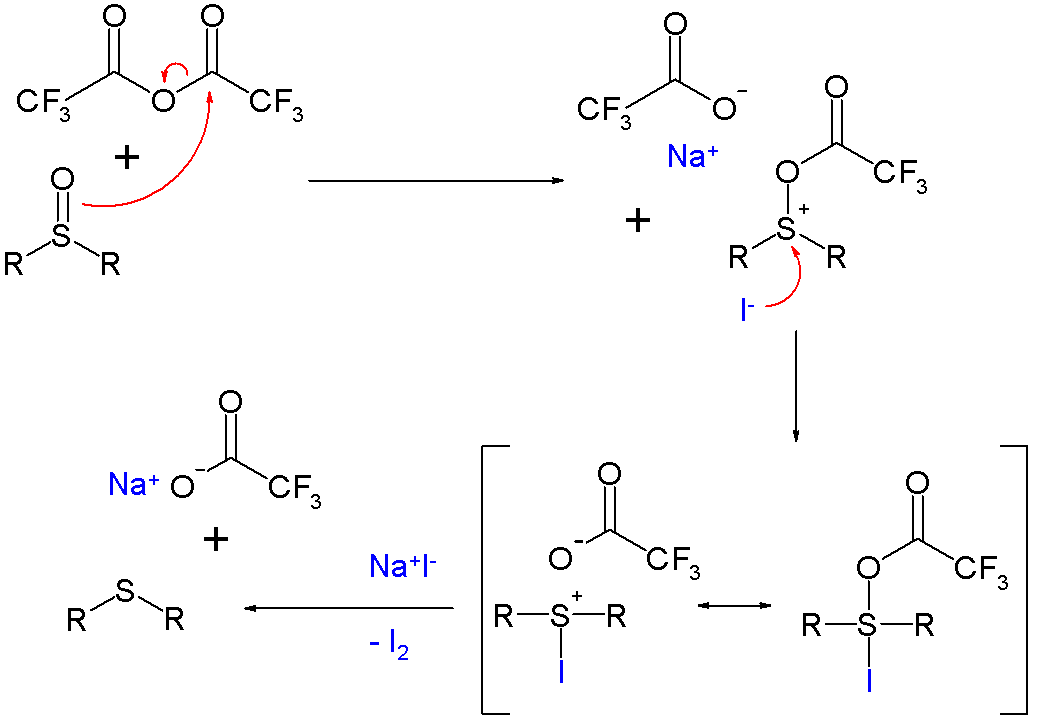

== See also ==
- Degassing
- Preparation of stable carbenes
- Ocean deoxygenation
- Oxophilicity
