= Manganese lactate =

Identifiers
CAS Number	51877-53-3
3D model (JSmol)	Interactive image
ChemSpider	135313
EC Number	240-182-0
PubChem CID	153528
UNII	6PH9331Y9Z
CompTox Dashboard (EPA)	DTXSID801015638 DTXSID50966208, DTXSID801015638
- InChI: InChI=1S/2C3H6O3.Mn/c2*1-2(4)3(5)6;/h2*2,4H,1H3,(H,5,6);/q;;+2/p-2 Key: KSNGEYQWLMRSIR-UHFFFAOYSA-L
- SMILES: CC(C(=O)[O-])O.CC(C(=O)[O-])O.[Mn+2]

Properties
Chemical formula	C_{6}H_{10}MnO_{6}
Molar mass	233.08 g/mol
Appearance	Pink crystals
Solubility in water	Very soluble
- Except where otherwise noted, data are given for materials in their standard state (at 25 °C [77 °F], 100 kPa). Infobox references

Manganese lactate is an organic chemical compound, a salt of manganese and lactic acid with the formula Mn(C_{3}H_{5}O_{3})_{2}. The compound forms light pink crystals, soluble in water, forming crystalline hydrates.

== Synthesis ==
Dissolution of manganese carbonate in lactic acid solution:

MnCO_{3} + 2C_{3}H_{6}O_{3} → Mn(C_{3}H_{5}O_{3})_{2} + CO_{2} + H_{2}O

== Physical properties ==
Manganese lactate forms light pink crystals.

Manganese lactate is soluble in water and ethanol.

Manganese lactate forms crystalline hydrates of composition Mn(C_{3}H_{5}O_{3})_{2}•n H_{2}O, where n = 2 and 3. Each lactate is a bidentate ligand. Two water molecules coordinate directly to the metal as well, cis to each other, to complete the octahedral cluster. In the trihydrate, the third water molecule is involved in hydrogen-bonding further away in the crystal structure.

Its dihydrate forms an orthorhombic crystal, the space group is P2_{1}2_{1}2_{1}.

The trihydrate is a monoclinic crystal, and the space group is P2_{1}.
