= Reducing agent =

Chemical species that donates an electron to another species in a redox reaction

In chemistry, a reducing agent (also known as a reductant, reducer, or electron donor) is a chemical species that "donates" an electron to an electron recipient (called the oxidizing agent, oxidant, oxidizer, or electron acceptor).

Examples of substances that are common reducing agents include hydrogen, carbon monoxide, the alkali metals, formic acid, oxalic acid, and sulfite compounds.

In their pre-reaction states, reducers have extra electrons (that is, they are by themselves reduced) and oxidizers lack electrons (that is, they are by themselves oxidized). This is commonly expressed in terms of their oxidation states. An agent's oxidation state describes its degree of loss of electrons, where the higher the oxidation state then the fewer electrons it has. So initially, prior to the reaction, a reducing agent is typically in one of its lower possible oxidation states; its oxidation state increases during the reaction while that of the oxidizer decreases. Thus in a redox reaction, the agent whose oxidation state increases, that "loses/donates electrons", that "is oxidized", and that "reduces" is called the reducer or reducing agent, while the agent whose oxidation state decreases, that "gains/accepts/receives electrons", that "is reduced", and that "oxidizes" is called the oxidizer or oxidizing agent.

For example, consider the overall reaction for aerobic cellular respiration:

C_{6}H_{12}O_{6}(s) + 6O_{2}(g) → 6CO_{2}(g) + 6H_{2}O(l)

The oxygen (O_{2}) is being reduced, so it is the oxidizing agent. The glucose (C_{6}H_{12}O_{6}) is being oxidized, so it is the reducing agent.

== Characteristics ==
Consider the following reaction:

2 [Fe(CN)_{6}]^{4−} + Cl_{2} → 2 [Fe(CN)_{6}]^{3−} + 2 Cl^{−}

The reducing agent in this reaction is ferrocyanide ([Fe(CN)_{6}]^{4−}). It donates an electron, becoming oxidized to ferricyanide ([Fe(CN)_{6}]^{3−}). Simultaneously, that electron is received by the oxidizer chlorine (Cl_{2}), which is reduced to chloride (Cl^{−}).

Strong reducing agents easily lose (or donate) electrons. An atom with a relatively large atomic radius tends to be a better reductant. In such species, the distance from the nucleus to the valence electrons is so long that these electrons are not strongly attracted. These elements tend to be strong reducing agents. Good reducing agents tend to consist of atoms with a low electronegativity, which is the ability of an atom or molecule to attract bonding electrons, and species with relatively small ionization energies serve as good reducing agents too.

The measure of a material's ability to reduce is known as its reduction potential. The table below shows a few reduction potentials, which can be changed to oxidation potentials by reversing the sign. Reducing agents can be ranked by increasing strength by ranking their reduction potentials. Reducers donate electrons to (that is, "reduce") oxidizing agents, which are said to "be reduced by" the reducer. The reducing agent is stronger when it has a more negative reduction potential and weaker when it has a more positive reduction potential. The more positive the reduction potential the greater the species' affinity for electrons and tendency to be reduced (that is, to receive electrons). The following table provides the reduction potentials of the indicated reducing agent at 25 °C. For example, among sodium (Na), chromium (Cr), cuprous (Cu^{+}) and chloride (Cl^{−}), it is Na that is the strongest reducing agent while Cl^{−} is the weakest; said differently, Na^{+} is the weakest oxidizing agent in this list while Cl is the strongest.

Reduction potentials of various reactions v
Oxidizing agent		Reducing agent	Reduction Potential (V)
Li^{+} + e^{−}	⇌	Li	−3.04
Na^{+} + e^{−}	⇌	Na	−2.71
Mg^{2+} + 2 e^{−}	⇌	Mg	−2.38
Al^{3+} + 3 e^{−}	⇌	Al	−1.66
2 H_{2}O (l) + 2 e^{−}	⇌	H_{2} (g) + 2 OH^{−}	−0.83
Cr^{3+} + 3 e^{−}	⇌	Cr	−0.74
Fe^{2+} + 2 e^{−}	⇌	Fe	−0.44
2 H^{+} + 2 e^{−}	⇌	H_{2}	0.00
Sn^{4+} + 2 e^{−}	⇌	Sn^{2+}	+0.15
Cu^{2+} + e^{−}	⇌	Cu^{+}	+0.16
Ag^{+} + e^{−}	⇌	Ag	+0.80
Br_{2} + 2 e^{−}	⇌	2 Br^{−}	+1.07
Cl_{2} + 2 e^{−}	⇌	2 Cl^{−}	+1.36
MnO^{−}_{4} + 8 H^{+} + 5 e^{−}	⇌	Mn^{2+} + 4 H_{2}O	+1.49
F_{2} + 2 e^{−}	⇌	2 F^{−}	+2.87

Common reducing agents include metals potassium, calcium, barium, sodium and magnesium, and also compounds that contain the hydride H^{−} ion, those being NaH, LiH, LiAlH_{4} and CaH_{2}.

Some elements and compounds can be both reducing or oxidizing agents. Hydrogen gas is a reducing agent when it reacts with non-metals and an oxidizing agent when it reacts with metals.

2 Li(s) + H_{2}(g) → 2 LiH(s) (Note: Half reactions: 2 Li^{0}(s) → 2 Li^{+}(s) + 2 e^{−} ::::: H_{2}^{0}(g) + 2 e^{−} → 2 H^{−}(g))

Hydrogen (whose reduction potential is 0.0) acts as an oxidizing agent because it accepts an electron donation from the reducing agent lithium (whose reduction potential is -3.04), which causes Li to be oxidized and hydrogen to be reduced.

H_{2}(g) + F_{2}(g) → 2 HF(g) (Note: Half reactions: H_{2}^{0}(g) → 2 H^{+}(g) + 2 e^{−} ::::: F_{2}^{0}(g) + 2 e^{−} → 2 F^{−}(g))

Hydrogen acts as a reducing agent because it donates its electrons to fluorine, which allows fluorine to be reduced.

== Importance ==
Reducing agents and oxidizing agents are the ones responsible for corrosion, which is the "degradation of metals as a result of electrochemical activity". Corrosion requires an anode and cathode to take place. The anode is an element that loses electrons (reducing agent), thus oxidation always occurs in the anode, and the cathode is an element that gains electrons (oxidizing agent), thus reduction always occurs in the cathode. Corrosion occurs whenever there's a difference in oxidation potential. When this is present, the anode metal begins deteriorating, given there is an electrical connection and the presence of an electrolyte.

== Examples of redox reaction ==
Example of a reduction–oxidation reaction between sodium and chlorine, with the OIL RIG mnemonic

Historically, reduction referred to the removal of oxygen from a compound, hence the name 'reduction'. An example of this phenomenon occurred during the Great Oxidation Event, in which biologically−produced molecular oxygen (dioxygen (O_{2}), an oxidizer and electron recipient) was added to the early Earth's atmosphere, which was originally a weakly reducing atmosphere containing reducing gases like methane (CH_{4}) and carbon monoxide (CO) (along with other electron donors) and practically no oxygen because any that was produced would react with these or other reducers (particularly with iron dissolved in sea water), resulting in their removal. By using water as a reducing agent, aquatic photosynthesizing cyanobacteria produced this molecular oxygen as a waste product. This O_{2} initially oxidized the ocean's dissolved ferrous iron (Fe(II) − meaning iron in its +2 oxidation state) to form insoluble ferric iron oxides such as Iron(III) oxide (Fe(II) lost an electron to the oxidizer and became Fe(III) − meaning iron in its +3 oxidation state) that precipitated down to the ocean floor to form banded iron formations, thereby removing the oxygen (and the iron). The rate of production of oxygen eventually exceeded the availability of reducing materials that removed oxygen, which ultimately led Earth to gain a strongly oxidizing atmosphere containing abundant oxygen (like the modern atmosphere). The modern sense of donating electrons is a generalization of this idea, acknowledging that other components can play a similar chemical role to oxygen.

The formation of iron(III) oxide;

4 Fe + 3 O_{2} → 4 Fe^{3+} + 6 O^{2−} → 2 Fe_{2}O_{3}

In the above equation, the Iron (Fe) has an oxidation number of 0 before and 3+ after the reaction. For oxygen (O) the oxidation number began as 0 and decreased to 2−. These changes can be viewed as two "half-reactions" that occur concurrently:

1. Oxidation half reaction: Fe^{0} → Fe^{3+} + 3 e^{−}
2. Reduction half reaction: O_{2} + 4 e^{−} → 2 O^{2−}

Iron (Fe) has been oxidized because the oxidation number increased. Iron is the reducing agent because it gave electrons to the oxygen (O_{2}). Oxygen (O_{2}) has been reduced because the oxidation number has decreased and is the oxidizing agent because it took electrons from iron (Fe).

== Common reducing agents ==
- Lithium aluminium hydride (LiAlH_{4}), a very strong reducing agent
- Red-Al (NaAlH_{2}(OCH_{2}CH_{2}OCH_{3})_{2}, a safer and more stable alternative to lithium aluminum hydride
- Hydrogen without or with a suitable catalyst; e.g. a Lindlar catalyst
- Sodium amalgam (Na(Hg))
- Sodium-lead alloy (Na + Pb)
- Zinc amalgam (Zn(Hg)) (reagent for Clemmensen reduction)
- Diborane
- Sodium borohydride (NaBH_{4})
- Ferrous compounds that contain the Fe^{2+} ion, such as iron(II) sulfate
- Stannous compounds that contain the Sn^{2+} ion, such as tin(II) chloride
- Sulfur dioxide (sometimes also used as an oxidizing agent), Sulfite compounds
- Hydrogen sulfide (HS)
- Dithionates, e.g. Na_{2}S_{2}O_{6}
- Thiosulfates, e.g. Na_{2}S_{2}O_{3} (mainly in analytical chemistry)
- Iodides, such as potassium iodide (KI) (mainly in analytical chemistry)
- Hydrogen peroxide (H_{2}O_{2}) – mostly an oxidant but can occasionally act as a reducing agent, typically in analytical chemistry
- Hydrazine (Wolff–Kishner reduction)
- Diisobutylaluminium hydride (DIBAL-H)
- Oxalic acid (C_{2}H_{2}O_{4})
- Formic acid (HCOOH)
- Ascorbic acid (C_{6}H_{8}O_{6})
- Reducing sugars, such as erythrose, see Aldose
- Phosphites, hypophosphites, and phosphorous acid
- Dithiothreitol (DTT) – used in biochemistry labs to avoid SS-bonds
- Carbon monoxide (CO)
- Cyanides in hydrochemical metallurgical processes
- Carbon (C)
- Tris-2-carboxyethylphosphine hydrochloride (TCEP)

== See also ==
- Corrosion – Gradual destruction of materials by chemical reaction with its environment
- Electrochemistry – Branch of physical chemistry
- Electrolyte – Substance whose dissolved ions conduct electricity
- Electron acceptor – Chemical entity capable of accepting electrons
- Electron donor – Chemical entity capable of donating electrons to another entity
- Electrosynthesis – Synthesis of chemical compounds in an electrochemical cell
- Organic reduction – Redox reaction that takes place with organic compounds
- Oxidizing agent – Chemical compound used to oxidize another substance in a chemical reaction
- Redox – Chemical reaction with oxidation state changes
- Reducing equivalent – Chemical reaction with oxidation state changes
- Salt-free reduction
