= Tungsten diarsenide =

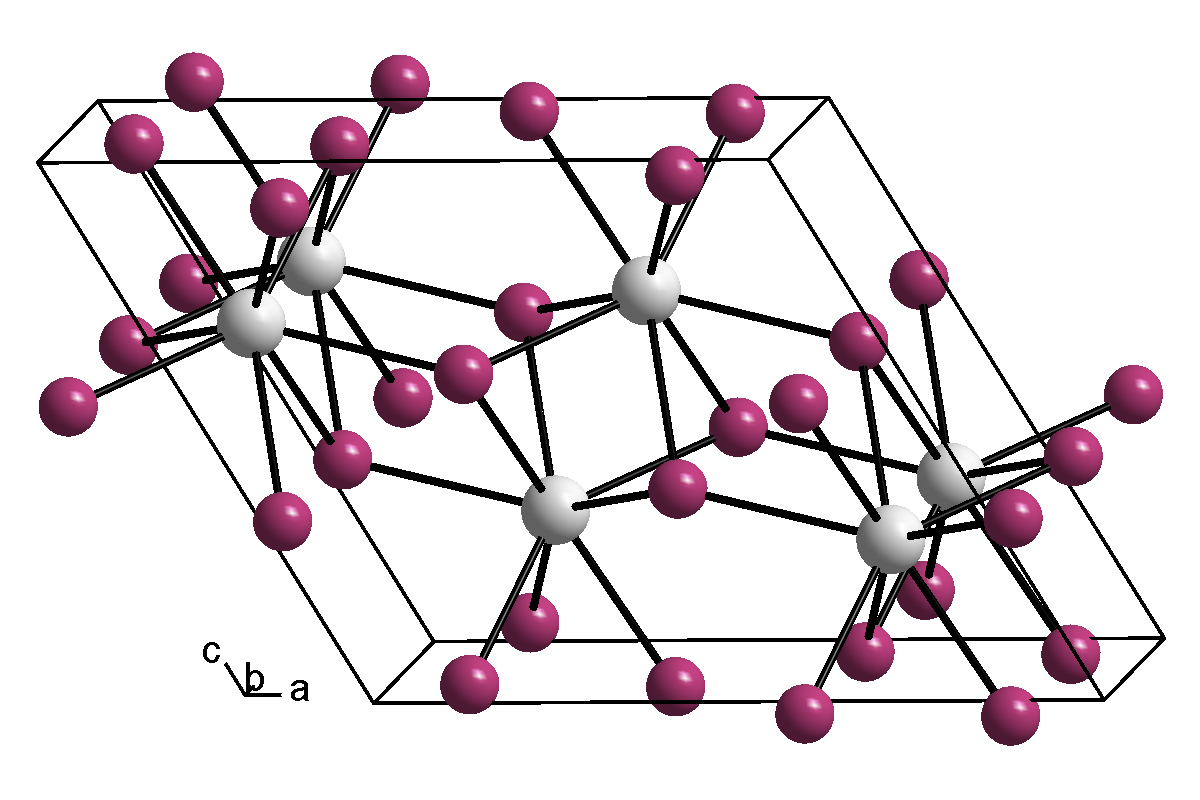

Identifiers
CAS Number	12006-39-2
3D model (JSmol)	Interactive image
- InChI: InChI=1S/2As.W Key: FPQIORWKRHXRSI-UHFFFAOYSA-N
- SMILES: [As]#[W]#[As]

Properties
Chemical formula	As_{2}W
Molar mass	333.68 g·mol^{−1}
Appearance	black solid
Density	6.9 g·cm^{−3}
Solubility in water	practically insoluble
- Except where otherwise noted, data are given for materials in their standard state (at 25 °C [77 °F], 100 kPa). Infobox references

Tungsten diarsenide is an arsenide of tungsten with the chemical formula WAs_{2}. Other tungsten arsenides include tungsten triarsenide (WAs_{3}) and ditungsten triarsenide (W_{2}As_{3}).

== Preparation ==
Tungsten diarsenide can be produced by the direct reaction of tungsten and arsenic at 600 to 1000 °C. It can also be formed by the reaction of arsenic or arsine and tungsten hexachloride.

== Properties ==
Tungsten diarsenide is a black solid. It forms crystals in the monoclinic crystal system with the same structure of molybdenum diarsenide. Tungsten diarsenide is insoluble in hydrofluoric acid, hydrochloric acid and alkaline aqueous solutions. It reacts with concentrated nitric acid and sulfuric acid. At high temperatures, tungsten diarsenide reacts with air to form tungsten trioxide and arsenic trioxide.
