= Tungsten(IV) chloride =

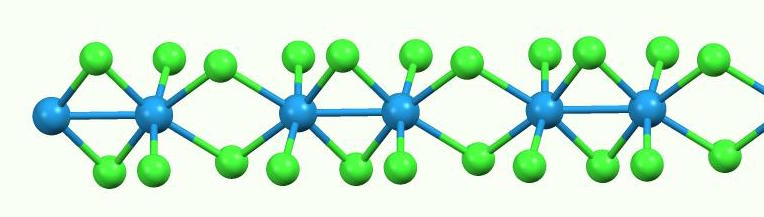

Names
- Other names tungsten tetrachloride

Identifiers
CAS Number	13470-13-8
3D model (JSmol)	Interactive image
ChemSpider	122991
ECHA InfoCard	100.157.353
EC Number	629-145-3
PubChem CID	139468
CompTox Dashboard (EPA)	DTXSID30158866
- InChI: Key: YOUIDGQAIILFBW-UHFFFAOYSA-J; InChI=1S/4ClH.W/h4*1H;/q;;;;+4/p-4
- SMILES: Cl[W](Cl)(Cl)Cl

Properties
Chemical formula	Cl_{4}W
Molar mass	325.65 g·mol^{−1}
Appearance	black solid
Density	4.62 g·cm^{−3}
Melting point	450 °C (842 °F; 723 K)

Hazards
- GHS labelling
Pictograms	(GHS05: Corrosive) (GHS07: Exclamation mark)
Signal word	Danger
Hazard statements	H302, H314
Precautionary statements	P260, P264, P270, P280, P301+P312, P301+P330+P331, P303+P361+P353, P304+P340, P305+P351+P338, P310, P321, P330, P363, P405, P501

Related compounds
Other anions	Tungsten(IV) fluoride
Related compounds	Tungsten(V) chloride Tungsten hexachloride
- Except where otherwise noted, data are given for materials in their standard state (at 25 °C [77 °F], 100 kPa). Infobox references

Tungsten(IV) chloride is an inorganic compound with the formula WCl_{4}. It is a diamagnetic black solid. The compound is of interest in research as one of a handful of binary tungsten chlorides.

== Structure and preparation ==
WCl_{4} is usually prepared by reduction tungsten hexachloride. Many reductants have been reported, including red phosphorus, tungsten hexacarbonyl, gallium, tin, and antimony. The latter is reported to be optimal:

$$\mathrm{3 \ WCl_6 + 2 \ Sb \longrightarrow 3 \ WCl_4 + 2 \ SbCl_3}$$

Like most binary metal halides, WCl_{4} is polymeric. It consists of linear chains of tungsten atoms each in octahedral geometry. Of six chloride ligands attached to each W center, four are bridging ligands. The W-W separations are alternatingly bonding (2.688 Å) and nonbonding (3.787 Å).

== Reactions ==
Reduction of tungsten(IV) chloride with sodium yields the ditungsten(III) heptachloride derivative:

2 WCl_{4} + 5 thf + 2 Na → [Na(thf)_{3}][W_{2}Cl_{7}(thf)_{2}] + NaCl
