= Salt-free reduction =

In chemistry, salt-free reduction describes methodology for reduction of metal halides by electron-rich trimethylsilyl reagents. Traditional reductions of metal halides are accomplished with alkali metals, a process that cogenerates alkali metal salts. Using the salt-free reduction, the reduction of metal halides is accompanied by formation of neutral organic compounds that can be easily removed from the inorganic or organometallic product. In addition to the reduction of metal halides, the reagents associated with this methodology are applicable to deoxygenation of organic substrates.

A typical reducing agent is N,N'-bis(trimethylsilyl)-4,4'-bipyridinylidene. Related pyrazine- and cyclohexadiene-based reagents have been developed. They are red or orange THF-soluble solids. The bipyridine reagent is produced by reduction of 4,4'-bipyridine in the presence of trimethylsilyl chloride (Me = CH_{3}):

NC_{5}H_{4}C_{5}H_{4}N + 2 Li + 2 Me_{3}SiCl → Me_{3}SiNC_{5}H_{4}C_{5}H_{4}NSiMe_{3} + 2 LiCl

A typical reduction reaction is the conversion of tungsten hexachloride to the tetrachloride using the silylated pyrazine reagent:

Me_{3}SiNC_{4}Me_{4}NSiMe_{3} + WCl_{6} + 2 thf → NC_{4}Me_{4}N + 2 Me_{3}SiCl + WCl_{4}(thf)_{2}
