= Tungsten(IV) fluoride =

Names
- IUPAC name tetrafluorotungsten
- Other names Tungsten(4+) tetrafluoride, Tungsten tetrafluoride

Identifiers
CAS Number	13766-47-7
3D model (JSmol)	Interactive image
ChemSpider	123101
EC Number	232-029-1
PubChem CID	139582
CompTox Dashboard (EPA)	DTXSID10160260
- InChI: InChI=1S/4FH.W/h4*1H;/q;;;;+4/p-4
- SMILES: F[W](F)(F)F

Properties
Chemical formula	WF_{4}
Molar mass	259.8336128 g/mol
Appearance	Red-Brown or Black Solid

Related compounds
Other anions	Tungsten(IV) chloride
- Except where otherwise noted, data are given for materials in their standard state (at 25 °C [77 °F], 100 kPa). Infobox references

Tungsten tetrafluoride is an inorganic compound with the formula WF_{4}. This little studied solid has been invoked, together with tungsten pentafluoride, as an intermediate in the chemical vapor deposition of tungsten films using tungsten hexafluoride.

== Structure ==
Tungsten tetrafluoride was found to have polymeric structure based on Mössbauer spectroscopy.

== Preparation ==
It has been prepared by treatment of the coordination complex WCl_{4}(MeCN)_{2} with AsF_{3}. It has been produced by the reaction of WF_{6} and a W filament at 600-800 °C.

== Reactions ==
The compound can be re-oxidized to W(VI) compounds by treatment with fluorine and chlorine:

WF_{4} + X_{2} → WF_{4}X_{2}

Upon heating, it disproportionates to WF_{6} and tungsten metal.
