= Tungsten hexabromide =

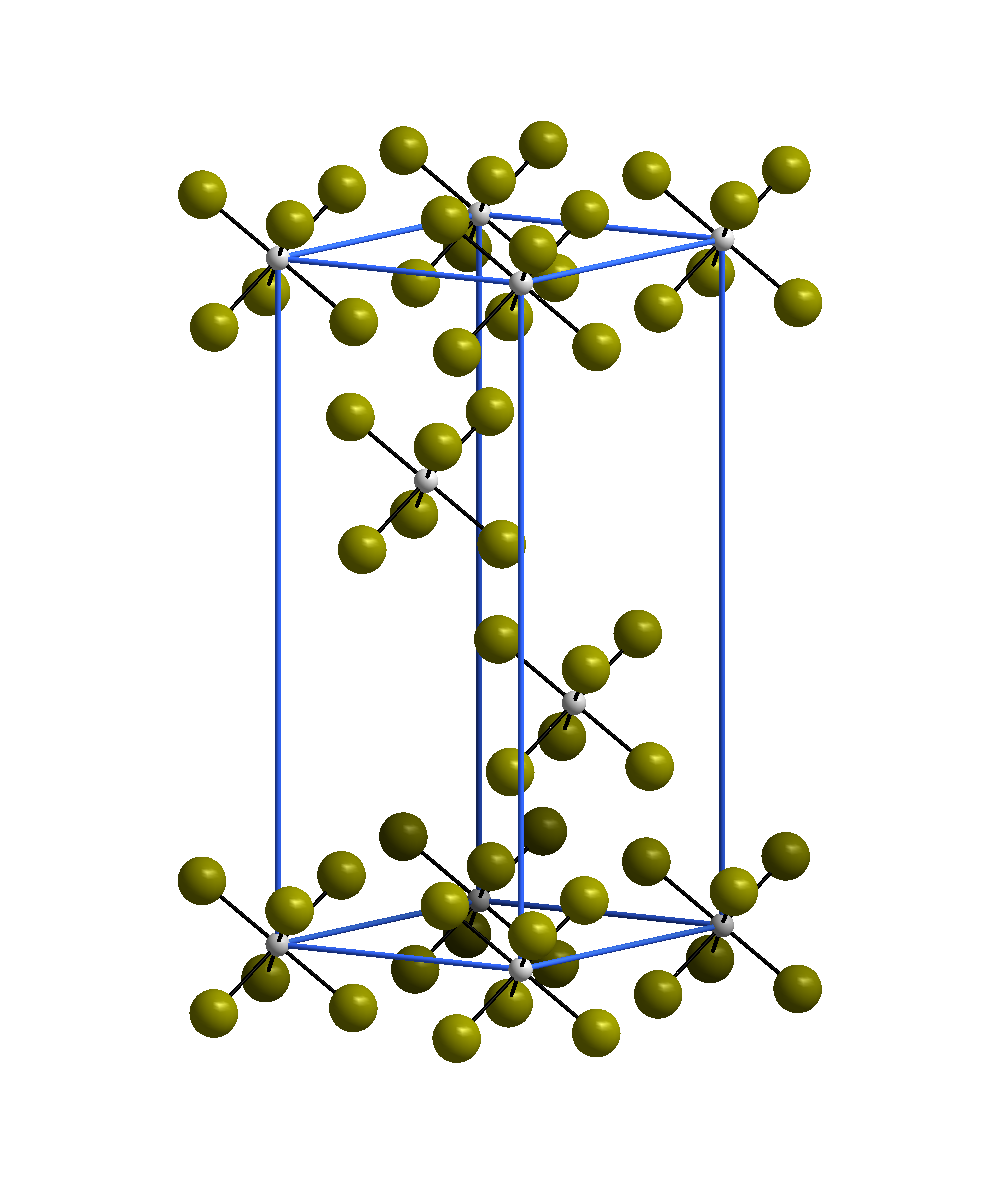

Names
- IUPAC name: Tungsten(VI) bromide; Tungsten hexabromide
- Other names Hexabromotungsten

Identifiers
CAS Number	13701-86-5
3D model (JSmol)	Interactive image
ChemSpider	103871330
PubChem CID	14440251
CompTox Dashboard (EPA)	DTXSID101294742
- InChI: Key: OQVJXQJWYQNWTI-UHFFFAOYSA-H; InChI=1S/6BrH.W/h6*1H;/q;;;;;;+6/p-6
- SMILES: Br[W](Br)(Br)(Br)(Br)Br

Properties
Chemical formula	WBr_{6}
Molar mass	663.264 g/mol
Appearance	Dark grey solid
Density	5.32 g/cm^{3}
Melting point	232 °C (450 °F; 505 K) (decomposition)
Solubility in water	Hydrolysis
Solubility	Soluble in ethanol, ether, carbon disulfide, and ammonia

Structure
Crystal structure	Rhombohedral
Space group	R3̅
Lattice constant	a = 6.39 Å, c = 17.53 Å
Lattice volume (V)	620.8 Å^{3}
Formula units (Z)	3

Related compounds
Other anions	Tungsten hexafluoride Tungsten hexachloride
Related compounds	Tungsten(V) bromide
- Except where otherwise noted, data are given for materials in their standard state (at 25 °C [77 °F], 100 kPa). Infobox references

Tungsten hexabromide, also known as tungsten(VI) bromide, is a chemical compound of tungsten and bromine with the formula WBr_{6}. It is an air-sensitive dark grey powder that decomposes above 200 °C to tungsten(V) bromide and bromine.

== Production and reactions ==
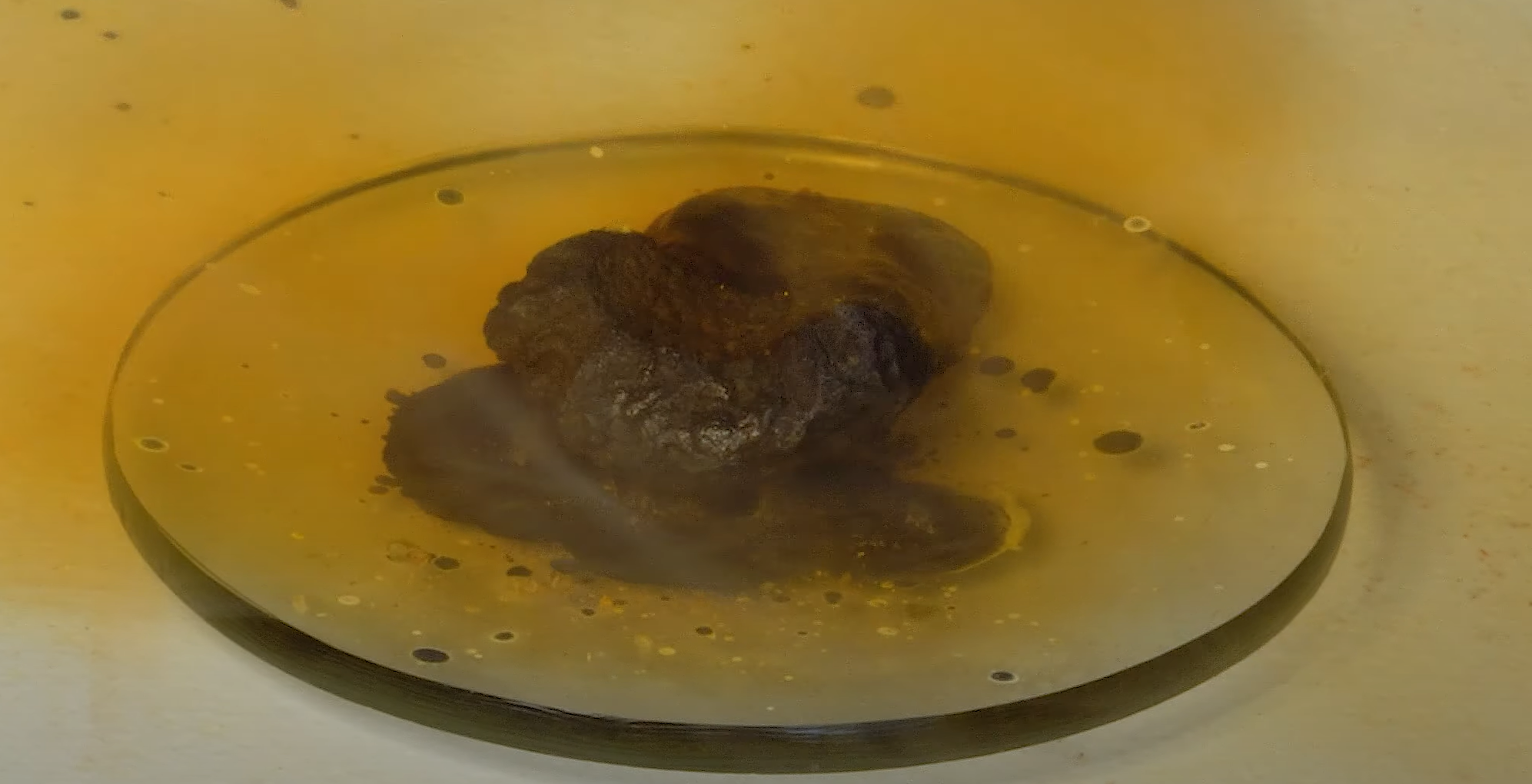
Production of WBr_{6} by the reaction of W(CO)_{6} and Br_{2}

Tungsten hexabromide is mainly produced by the reaction of metallic tungsten and bromine at temperatures around 100 °C in a nitrogen atmosphere:

W + 3 Br_{2} → WBr_{6}

Another method of producing this compound is by the reaction of tungsten hexacarbonyl and bromine at room temperature, releasing carbon monoxide. It can also be produced by the metathesis reaction of boron tribromide and tungsten hexachloride.

WBr_{6} is reduced with elemental antimony at elevated temperatures, consecutively producing, WBr_{5}, WBr_{4}, W_{4}Br_{10}, W_{5}Br_{12}, then finally WBr_{2} at 350 °C. This reaction produces antimony tribromide as a side product. Any of these bromides can be reverted to the hexabromide by oxidation with bromine at 160 °C.

Tungsten hexabromide is hydrolyzed in water, producing tungsten trioxide and releasing hydrobromic acid.

Tungsten(VI) oxytetrabromide is produced by the reaction of tungsten hexabromide and tungsten(VI) oxide:

2 WBr_{6} + WO_{3} → 3 WOBr_{4}

== Structure ==
The trigonal crystal structure of WBr_{6} consists of isolated WBr_{6} octahedra and is isostructural with α-WCl_{6}.
