= Oxophilicity =

Tendency to form oxides

Oxophilicity is the tendency of certain chemical compounds to form oxides by hydrolysis or abstraction of an oxygen atom from another molecule, often from organic compounds. The term is often used to describe metal centers, commonly the early transition metals such as titanium, niobium, and tungsten. Oxophilicity is often stated to be related to the hardness of the element, within the HSAB theory (hard and soft (Lewis) acids and bases), but it has been shown that oxophilicity depends more on the electronegativity and effective nuclear charge of the element than on its hardness. This explains why the early transition metals, whose electronegativities and effective nuclear charges are low, are very oxophilic. Many main group compounds are also oxophilic, such as derivatives of aluminium, silicon, and phosphorus(III). The handling of oxophilic compounds often requires air-free techniques.

== Examples ==
Complexes of oxophilic metals typically are prone to hydrolysis. For example, the high valent chlorides hydrolyze rapidly to give oxides:

TiCl_{4} + 2 H_{2}O → TiO_{2} + 4 HCl

These reactions proceed via oxychloride intermediates. For example, WOCl_{4} results from the partial hydrolysis of tungsten hexachloride. Hydroxide-containing intermediates are rarely observed for oxophilic metals. In contrast, the anhydrous halides of the later metals tend to hydrate, not hydrolyze, and they often form hydroxides.

Reduced complexes of oxophilic metals tend to generate oxides by reaction with oxygen. Typically the oxide-ligand is bridging, e.g.

2 (C_{5}H_{5})_{2}TiCl + 1/2 O_{2} → {(C_{5}H_{5})_{2}TiCl}_{2}O

Only in rare cases do the products of oxygenation feature terminal oxo ligands.

== Applications of oxophilicity in synthesis ==
Oxophilic reagents are often used to extract or exchange oxygen centers in organic substrates, especially carbonyls (esters, ketones, amides) and epoxides. The highly oxophilic reagent generated from tungsten hexachloride and butyl lithium is useful for the deoxygenation of epoxides. Such conversions are sometimes valuable in organic synthesis. In the McMurry reaction, ketones are converted into alkenes using oxophilic reagents:

2 R_{2}CO + Ti → R_{2}C=CR_{2} + TiO_{2}

Similarly, Tebbe's reagent is used in olefination reactions:

Cp_{2}TiCH_{2}AlCl(CH_{3})_{2} + R_{2}C=O → Cp_{2}TiO + 0.5 (AlCl(CH_{3})_{2})_{2} + R_{2}C=CH_{2}

Oxophilic main group compounds are also well known and useful. The highly oxophilic reagent Si_{2}Cl_{6} stereospecifically deoxygenates phosphine oxides. Phosphorus pentasulfide and the related Lawesson's reagent convert certain organic carbonyls to the corresponding sulfur derivatives:

P_{4}S_{10} + n R_{2}C=O → P_{4}S_{10−n}O_{n} + n R_{2}C=S

Owing to the high stability of carbon dioxide, many carbon compounds such as phosgene are oxophilic. This reactivity is used for recycling of triphenylphosphine oxide:

OPPh_{3} + COCl_{2} → Cl_{2}PPh_{3} + CO_{2}
