= Tungsten hexachloride =

Tungsten-chloride compound

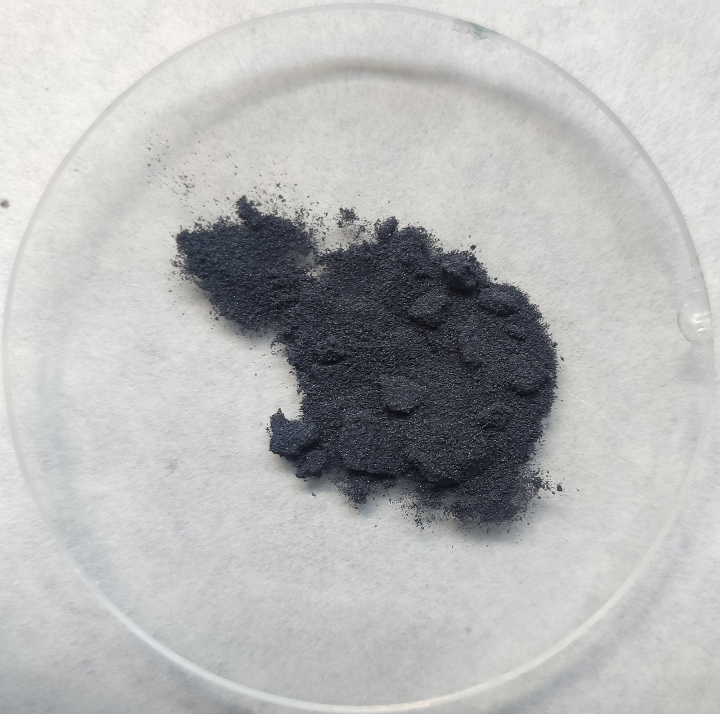
- α-Tungsten hexachloride

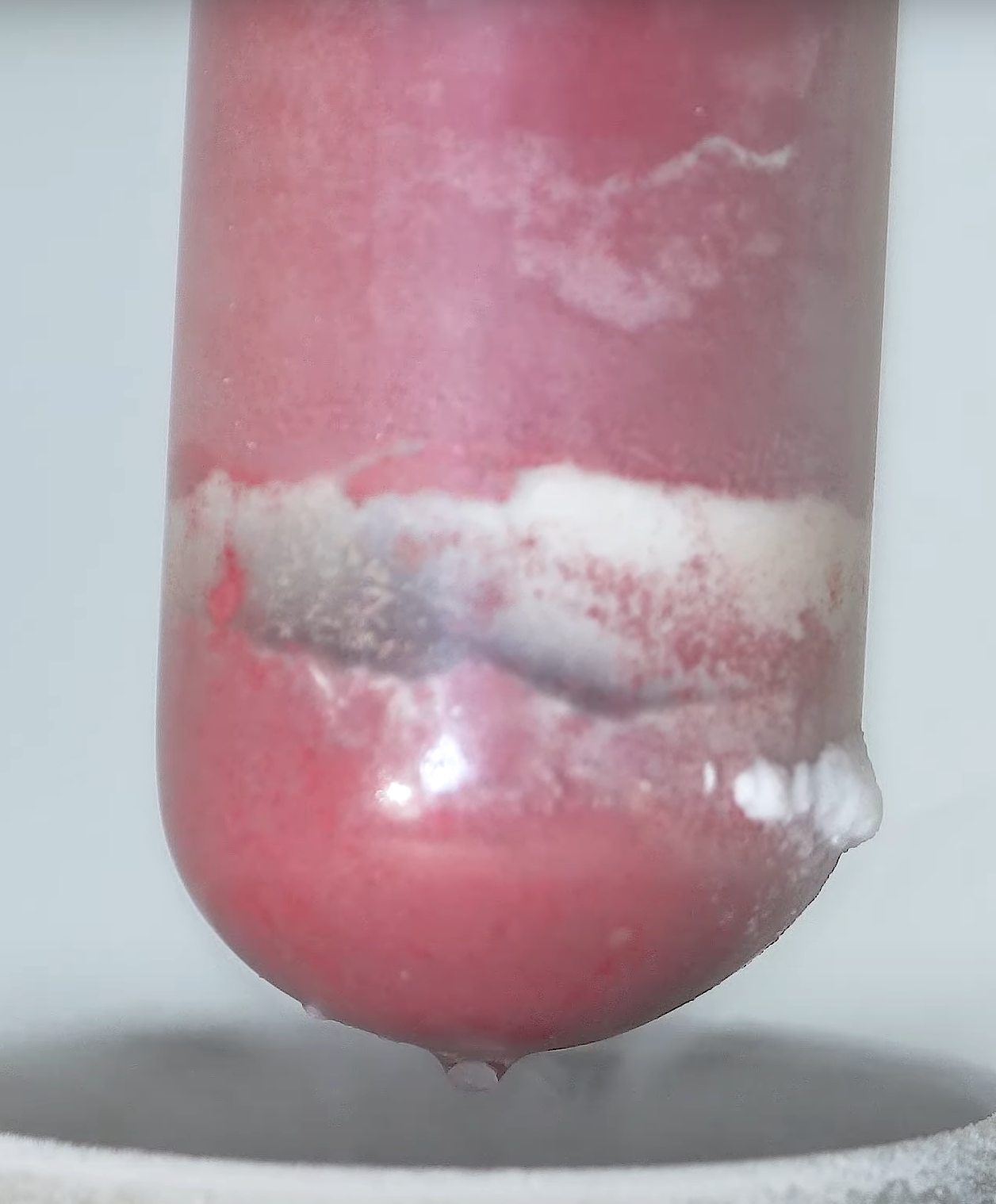
- β-Tungsten hexachloride

Tungsten hexachloride
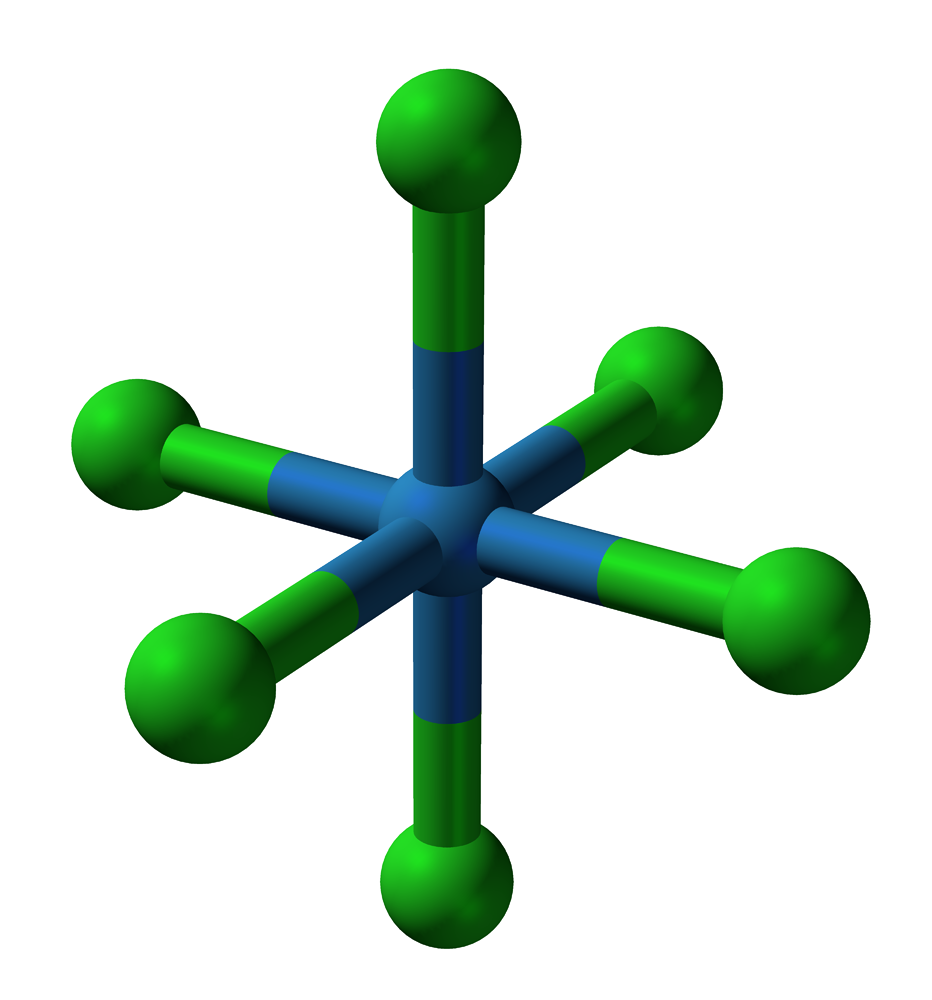
3D view

Names
- IUPAC names Tungsten hexachloride Tungsten(VI) chloride

Identifiers
CAS Number	13283-01-7
3D model (JSmol)	Interactive image
ChemSpider	75162
ECHA InfoCard	100.032.980
EC Number	236-293-9
PubChem CID	83301
RTECS number	YO7710000
UNII	L32HZV95ZE
CompTox Dashboard (EPA)	DTXSID40893933
- InChI: InChI=1S/6ClH.W/h6*1H;/q;;;;;;+6/p-6 Key: KPGXUAIFQMJJFB-UHFFFAOYSA-H
- SMILES: Cl[W](Cl)(Cl)(Cl)(Cl)Cl

Properties
Chemical formula	WCl_{6}
Molar mass	396.54 g·mol^{−1}
Appearance	dark blue crystals, moisture sensitive
Density	3.52 g/cm^{3}
Melting point	275 °C (527 °F; 548 K)
Boiling point	346.7 °C (656.1 °F; 619.8 K)
Solubility in water	Hydrolyzes
Solubility in chlorocarbons	soluble
Magnetic susceptibility (χ)	−71.0·10^{−6} cm^{3}/mol

Structure
Crystal structure	α:rhombohedral, β: hexagonal
Coordination geometry	Octahedral
Dipole moment	0 D

Hazards
- Occupational safety and health (OHS/OSH)
Main hazards	oxidizer; hydrolysis releases HCl

Related compounds
Other anions	Tungsten hexafluoride; Tungsten hexabromide
Other cations	Molybdenum(VI) chloride; Uranium hexachloride
Related compounds	Tungsten(VI) oxytetrachloride; Tungsten dichloride dioxide; Tungsten(V) chloride; Tungsten(IV) chloride; Tungsten(III) chloride; Tungsten(II) chloride; Molybdenum(V) chloride; Chromyl chloride
- Except where otherwise noted, data are given for materials in their standard state (at 25 °C [77 °F], 100 kPa). verify (what is ?) Infobox references

Tungsten hexachloride is an inorganic chemical compound of tungsten and chlorine with the chemical formula WCl_{6}. This dark violet-blue compound exists as volatile crystals under standard conditions. It is an important starting reagent in the preparation of tungsten compounds. Other examples of charge-neutral hexachlorides are rhenium(VI) chloride and molybdenum(VI) chloride. The highly volatile tungsten hexafluoride is also known.

As a d^{0} atom, tungsten hexachloride is diamagnetic.

== Preparation and structure ==
Tungsten hexachloride can be prepared by chlorinating tungsten metal in a sealed tube at 600 °C:

W + 3 Cl_{2} → WCl_{6}

Tungsten hexachloride exists in both blue and red polymorphs, referred to respectively as α and β. The wine-red β can be obtained by rapid cooling, whereas the blue α form is more stable at room temperature. Although these polymorphs are distinctly colored, their molecular structures are very similar. Both polymorphs feature WCl_{6} molecules that have octahedral geometry, in which all six W–Cl bonds are equivalent, and their length is equal to 224–226 pm. The densities are very similar: 3.68 g/cm^{3} for α and 3.62 g/cm^{3} for β. The low-temperature form is slightly more dense, as expected.

== Reactions ==
Tungsten hexachloride is readily hydrolyzed, even by moist air, giving the orange oxychlorides WOCl_{4} and WO_{2}Cl_{2}, and subsequently, tungsten trioxide. WCl_{6} is soluble in carbon disulfide, carbon tetrachloride, and phosphorus oxychloride.

Methylation with trimethylaluminium affords hexamethyl tungsten:

WCl_{6} + 3 Al_{2}(CH_{3})_{6} → W(CH_{3})_{6} + 3 Al_{2}(CH_{3})_{4}Cl_{2}

Treatment with butyl lithium affords a reagent that is useful for deoxygenation of epoxides.

The chloride ligands in WCl_{6} can be replaced by many anionic ligands including: bromide, thiocyanate, alkoxide, alkyl and aryl.

Reduction of WCl_{6} can be effected with a mixture of tetrachloroethylene and tetraphenylarsonium chloride:

2 WCl_{6} + Cl_{2}C=CCl_{2} + 2 (C_{6}H_{5})_{4}AsCl → 2 (C_{6}H_{5})_{4}As[WCl_{6}] + Cl_{3}C−CCl_{3}

The W(V) hexachloride is a derivative of tungsten(V) chloride.

It reacts with arsenic or hydrogen arsenide to form tungsten diarsenide.

== Safety considerations ==
WCl_{6} is an aggressively corrosive oxidant, and hydrolyzes to release hydrogen chloride.
