= Tungsten(V) chloride =

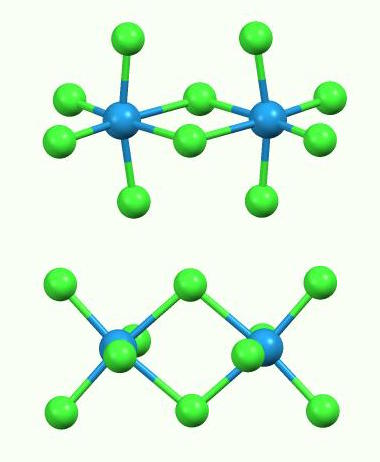
- Tungsten(V) chloride

Names
- Other names tungsten pentachloride

Identifiers
CAS Number	13470-14-9
3D model (JSmol)	Interactive image; Interactive image
ChemSpider	122992
ECHA InfoCard	100.235.076
EC Number	807-430-5
PubChem CID	139469
CompTox Dashboard (EPA)	DTXSID90158867
- InChI: InChI=1S/5ClH.W/h5*1H;/q;;;;;+5/p-5 Key: WIDQNNDDTXUPAN-UHFFFAOYSA-I; InChI=1S/5ClH.W/h5*1H;/q;;;;;+5/p-5
- SMILES: Cl[W](Cl)(Cl)(Cl)Cl; Cl1[W](Cl)(Cl)(Cl)(Cl)Cl[W]1(Cl)(Cl)(Cl)Cl

Properties
Chemical formula	W_{2}Cl_{10}
Molar mass	361.1 g/mol
Appearance	black crystals hygroscopic
Density	3.86 g/cm^{3}
Melting point	248 °C (478 °F; 521 K)
Boiling point	275.6 °C (528.1 °F; 548.8 K)
Magnetic susceptibility (χ)	+387.0·10^{−6} cm^{3}/mol

Hazards
- GHS labelling
Pictograms	(GHS05: Corrosive) (GHS07: Exclamation mark)
Signal word	Danger
Hazard statements	H302, H314

Related compounds
Related compounds	Tungsten(IV) chloride Tungsten hexachloride
- Except where otherwise noted, data are given for materials in their standard state (at 25 °C [77 °F], 100 kPa). verify (what is ?) Infobox references

Tungsten(V) chloride is an inorganic compound with the formula W_{2}Cl_{10}. This compound is analogous in many ways to the more familiar molybdenum pentachloride.

== Synthesis ==
The material is prepared by reduction of tungsten hexachloride. One method involves the use of tetrachloroethylene as the reductant

2 WCl_{6} + C_{2}Cl_{4} → W_{2}Cl_{10} + C_{2}Cl_{6}

When the same reduction is conducted in the presence of tetraphenylarsonium chloride, one obtains instead the hexachlorotungstate(V) salt:

2 WCl_{6} + Cl_{2}C=CCl_{2} + 2 (C_{6}H_{5})_{4}AsCl → 2 (C_{6}H_{5})_{4}As[WCl_{6}] + Cl_{3}C−CCl_{3}

== Properties ==
The blue green solid is volatile under vacuum and slightly soluble in nonpolar solvents. The compound is oxophilic and highly reactive towards Lewis bases.

== Structure ==
The compound exists as a dimer, with a pair of octahedral tungsten(V) centres bridged by two chloride ligands. The W---W separation is 3.814 Å, which is non-bonding. The compound is isostructural with Nb_{2}Cl_{10} and Mo_{2}Cl_{10}. The compound evaporates to give trigonal bipyramidal WCl_{5} monomers.
