= Tungsten(VI) oxytetrachloride =

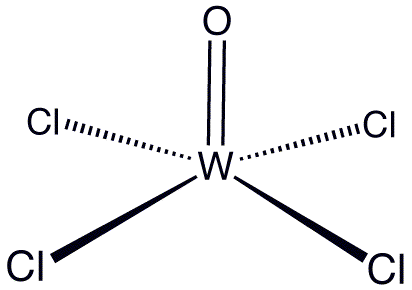

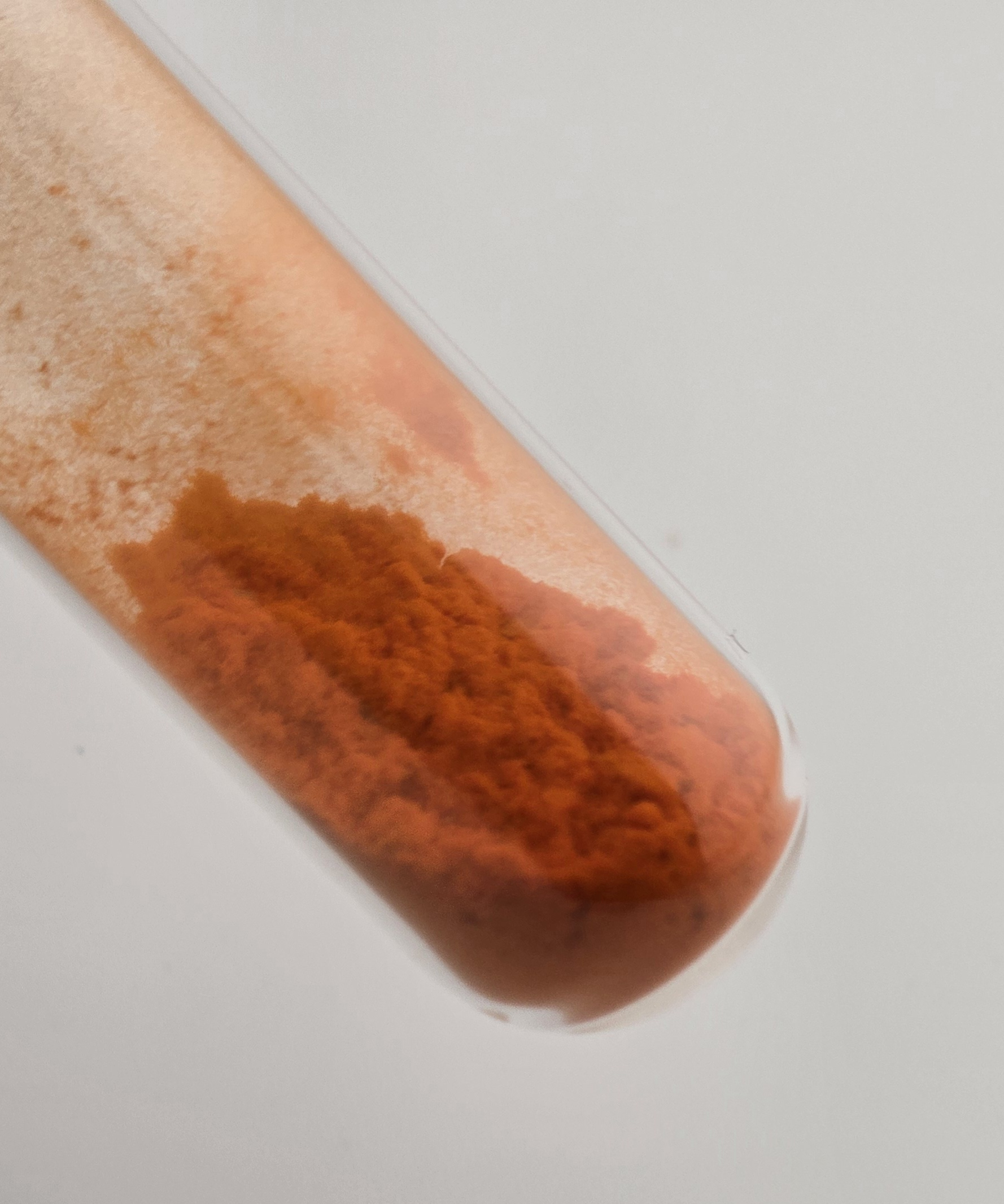

Names
- Other names Tungsten(VI) tetrachloride oxide

Identifiers
CAS Number	13520-78-0
3D model (JSmol)	Interactive image
ChemSpider	21171360
ECHA InfoCard	100.033.497
EC Number	236-863-7
PubChem CID	19596810
- InChI: InChI=1S/4ClH.O.W/h4*1H;;/q;;;;;+4/p-4 Key: LQNAFXBTXJHEAX-UHFFFAOYSA-J
- SMILES: O=[W](Cl)(Cl)(Cl)Cl

Properties
Chemical formula	WOCl_{4}
Molar mass	341.651 g/mol
Appearance	Orange-Red crystals
Density	11.92 g/cm^{3}
Melting point	211 °C (412 °F; 484 K)
Boiling point	227.55 °C (441.59 °F; 500.70 K)
Solubility in water	reacts
Solubility	soluble in benzene and CS_{2}

Hazards
- GHS labelling
Pictograms	(GHS07: Exclamation mark)
Signal word	Warning
Hazard statements	H315, H319, H335
Precautionary statements	P261, P264, P271, P280, P302+P352, P304+P340, P305+P351+P338, P312, P321, P332+P313, P337+P313, P362, P403+P233, P405, P501

Related compounds
Other anions	Tungsten(VI) oxytetrafluoride Tungsten(VI) oxytetrabromide
Other cations	Molybdenum oxytetrachloride
Related compounds	Tungsten dichloride dioxide
- Except where otherwise noted, data are given for materials in their standard state (at 25 °C [77 °F], 100 kPa). verify (what is ?) Infobox references

Tungsten(VI) oxytetrachloride is the inorganic compound with the formula WOCl_{4}. This diamagnetic solid is used to prepare other complexes of tungsten. The red-orange solid that is soluble in aromatic and chlorinated solvents. It reacts with alcohols and water.

== Structure ==
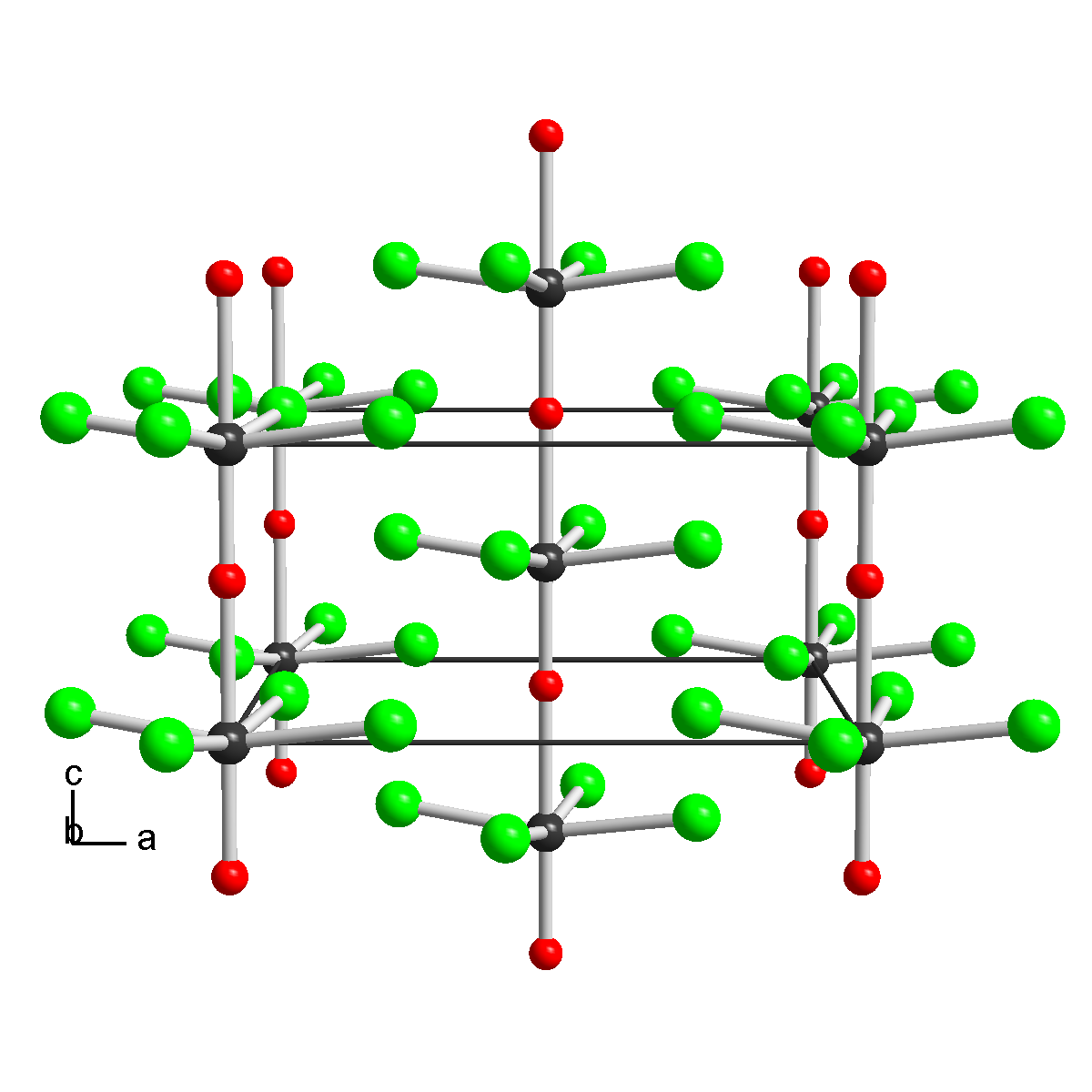
Structure of solid WOCl_{4}, illustrating its polymeric structure with short W≡O and weak W---O bonds in the chains. Oxygen, O; Chlorine, Cl; Tungsten, W

The solid consists of weakly associated square pyramidal monomers. The compound is classified as an oxyhalide.

== Synthesis and reactions ==
WOCl_{4} is prepared from tungsten trioxide or hexachloride:

WO_{3} + 2 SOCl_{2} → WOCl_{4} + 2 SO_{2}
WCl_{6} + ((CH_{3})_{3}Si)_{2}O → WOCl_{4} + 2 (CH_{3})_{3}SiCl

It is "difficult to prepare by other means," but thionyl chloride also oxidizes tungsten(IV) oxide to the oxytetrachloride at 200 °C.

WOCl_{4} is a Lewis acid. It forms 1:1 adducts with Lewis bases such as acetonitrile and THF.

It is a precursor to catalysts used for polymerization of alkynes.
