= Tungsten hexafluoride =

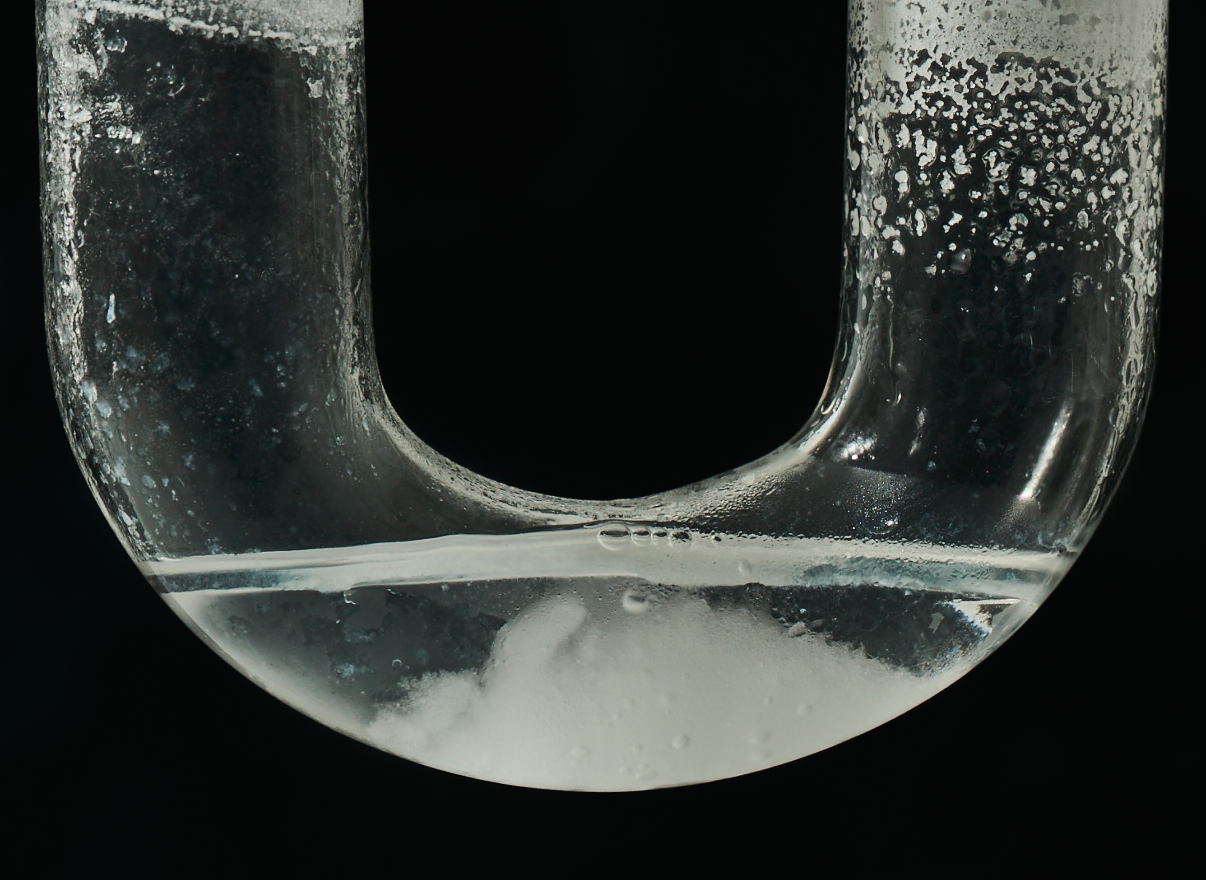
- Solid WF_{6} melting into liquid WF_{6}

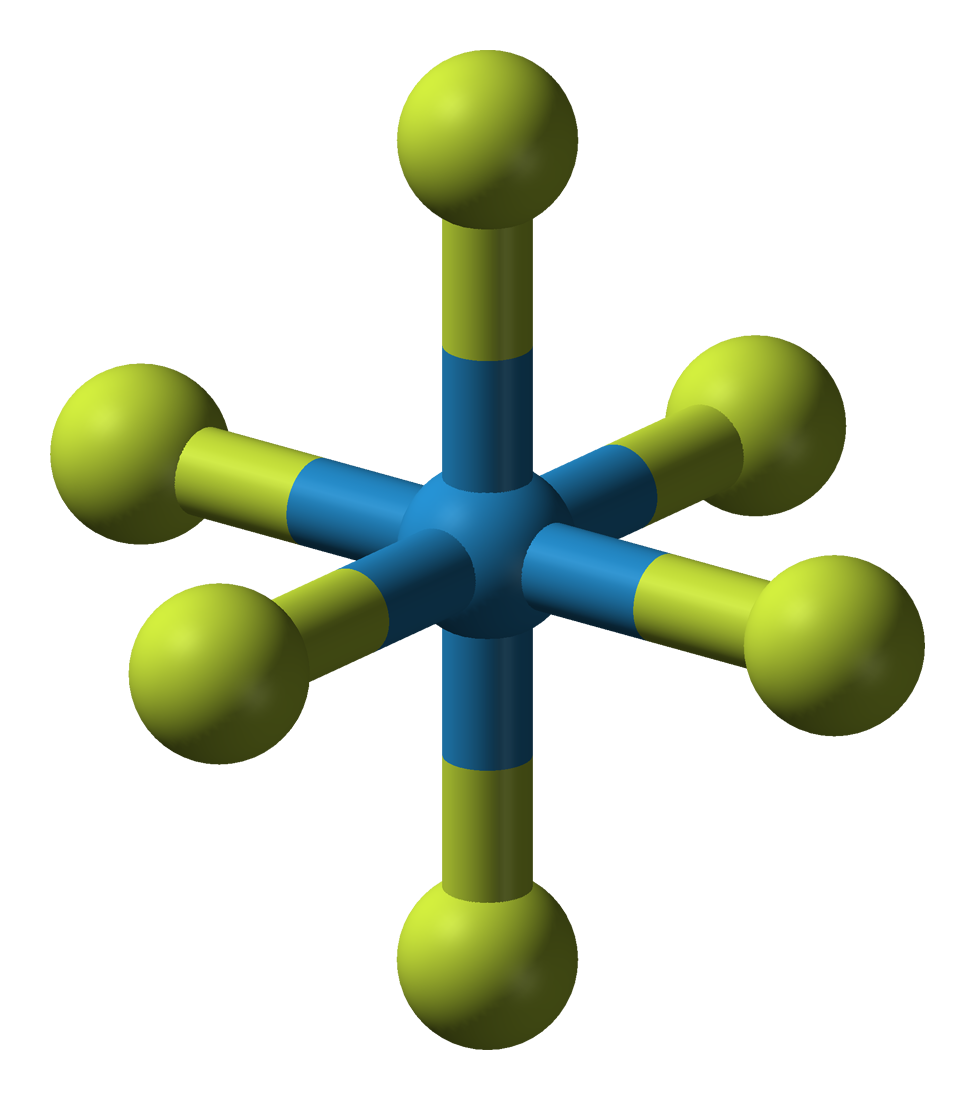
Tungsten(VI) fluoride
Ball-and-stick model of tungsten hexafluoride

Names
- IUPAC name: Tungsten hexafluoride; Tungsten(VI) fluoride

Identifiers
CAS Number	7783-82-6
3D model (JSmol)	Interactive image
ChemSpider	455941
ECHA InfoCard	100.029.117
EC Number	232-029-1
PubChem CID	522684
UNII	45B0AG2C4S
UN number	2196
CompTox Dashboard (EPA)	DTXSID80893770
- InChI: InChI=1S/6FH.W/h6*1H;/q;;;;;;+6/p-6
- SMILES: F[W](F)(F)(F)(F)F

Properties
Chemical formula	WF_{6}
Molar mass	297.830 g/mol
Appearance	Colorless gas
Density	12.4 g/L (gas); 4.56 g/cm^{3} (−9 °C, solid)
Melting point	2.3 °C (36.1 °F; 275.4 K)
Boiling point	17.1 °C (62.8 °F; 290.2 K)
Solubility in water	Hydrolyzes
Magnetic susceptibility (χ)	−40.0·10^{−6} cm^{3}/mol

Structure
Molecular shape	Octahedral
Dipole moment	zero

Hazards
- Occupational safety and health (OHS/OSH)
Main hazards	Toxic, corrosive; gives HF on contact with water
- GHS labelling
Pictograms	(GHS05: Corrosive) (GHS06: Toxic)
Signal word	Danger
Hazard statements	H301+H311, H314, H330
Precautionary statements	P260, P264, P264+P265, P270, P271, P280, P284, P301+P316, P301+P330+P331, P302+P352, P302+P361+P354, P304+P340, P305+P354+P338, P316, P317, P320, P321, P330, P361+P364, P363, P403+P233, P405, P410+P403, P501
NFPA 704 (fire diamond)	4 0 2 W
Flash point	Non-flammable
Safety data sheet (SDS)	ChemAdvisor

Related compounds
Other anions	Tungsten hexachloride; Tungsten hexabromide
Other cations	Chromium(VI) fluoride; Molybdenum(VI) fluoride; Uranium hexafluoride
Related compounds	Sulfur hexafluoride; Tungsten(IV) fluoride; Tungsten(V) fluoride; Tungsten oxytetrafluoride
- Except where otherwise noted, data are given for materials in their standard state (at 25 °C [77 °F], 100 kPa). verify (what is ?) Infobox references

Tungsten(VI) fluoride, also known as tungsten hexafluoride, is an inorganic compound with the formula WF_{6}. It is a toxic, corrosive, colorless gas, with a density of about 13 kg/m^{3} (22 lb/cu yd) (roughly 11 times heavier than air). It is the densest known gas under standard ambient temperature and pressure (298 K, 1 atm) and the only well-characterized gas under these conditions that contains a transition metal. WF_{6} is commonly used by the semiconductor industry to form tungsten films, through the process of chemical vapor deposition. This layer is used in a low-resistivity metallic "interconnect". It is one of seventeen known binary hexafluorides.

== Properties ==
The WF_{6} molecule is octahedral with the symmetry point group of O_{h}. The W–F bond distances are 183.2 pm. Between 2.3 and 17 °C, tungsten hexafluoride condenses into a colorless liquid having the density of 3.44 g/cm^{3} at 15 °C. At 2.3 °C it freezes into a white solid having a cubic crystalline structure, a lattice constant of 628 pm, and calculated density 3.99 g/cm^{3}. At −9 °C, this structure transforms into an orthorhombic solid with the lattice constants of a = 960.3 pm, b = 871.3 pm, and c = 504.4 pm, and a density of 4.56 g/cm^{3}. In this phase, the W–F distance is 181 pm, and the mean closest molecular contacts are 312 pm. Whereas WF_{6} gas is one of the densest gases, with a density exceeding that of the heaviest elemental gas radon (9.73 g/L), the density of WF_{6} in the liquid and solid state is rather moderate. The vapor pressure of WF_{6} between −70 and 17 °C can be described by the equation

log_{10} P = 4.55569 − 1021.208/( T + 208.45)

where the P = vapor pressure (bar), T = temperature (°C).

== History and synthesis ==
Tungsten hexafluoride was first obtained by conversion of tungsten hexachloride with hydrogen fluoride by Otto Ruff and Fritz Eisner in 1905:

WCl_{6} + 6 HF → WF_{6} + 6 HCl

The compound is now commonly produced by the exothermic reaction of fluorine gas with tungsten powder at a temperature between 350 and 400 °C:

W + 3 F_{2} → WF_{6}

The gaseous product is separated from WOF_{4}, a common impurity, by distillation. In a variation on the direct fluorination, the metal is placed in a heated reactor, slightly pressurized to 1.2 to 2.0 psi (8.3 to 13.8 kPa), with a constant flow of WF_{6} infused with a small amount of fluorine gas.

The fluorine gas in the above method can be substituted by ClF, ClF_{3}, or BrF_{3}. An alternative procedure for producing tungsten fluoride is to treat tungsten trioxide (WO_{3}) with HF, BrF_{3}, or SF_{4}. And besides HF, other fluorinating agents can also be used to convert tungsten hexachloride in a way similar to Ruff and Eisner's original method:

WCl_{6} + 2 AsF_{3} → WF_{6} + 2 AsCl_{3} or
WCl_{6} + 3 SbF_{5} → WF_{6} + 3 SbF_{3}Cl_{2}

== Reactions ==
On contact with water, tungsten hexafluoride gives hydrogen fluoride (HF) and tungsten oxyfluorides, eventually forming tungsten trioxide:

WF_{6} + 3 H_{2}O → WO_{3} + 6 HF

Unlike some other metal fluorides, WF_{6} is not a useful fluorinating agent, nor is it a powerful oxidant. It can be reduced to the yellow WF_{4}.

WF_{6} forms a variety of 1:1 and 1:2 adducts with Lewis bases, examples being WF_{6}(S(CH_{3})_{2}), WF_{6}(S(CH_{3})_{2})_{2}, WF_{6}(P(CH_{3})_{3}), and WF_{6}(py)_{2}.

== Applications in the semiconductor industry ==
The dominant application of tungsten fluoride is in the semiconductor industry, where it is widely used for depositing tungsten metal in a chemical vapor deposition (CVD) process. The expansion of the industry in the 1980s and 1990s resulted in an increase in WF_{6} consumption, which remains at around 200 tonnes per year worldwide. Tungsten metal is attractive because of its relatively high thermal and chemical stability, as well as low resistivity (5.6 μΩ·cm) and very low electromigration. WF_{6} is favored over related compounds, such as WCl_{6} or WBr_{6}, because of its higher vapor pressure resulting in higher deposition rates. Since 1967, two WF_{6} deposition routes have been developed and employed: thermal decomposition and hydrogen reduction. The required WF_{6} gas purity is rather high and varies between 99.98% and 99.9995% depending on the application.

WF_{6} molecules have to be split up in the CVD process. The decomposition is usually facilitated by mixing WF_{6} with hydrogen, silane, germane, diborane, phosphine, and related hydrogen-containing gases.

=== Silicon ===
WF_{6} reacts upon contact with a silicon substrate. The WF_{6} decomposition on silicon is temperature-dependent:

2 WF_{6} + 3 Si → 2 W + 3 SiF_{4} below 400 °C and
WF_{6} + 3 Si → W + 3 SiF_{2} above 400 °C.

This dependence is crucial, as twice as much silicon is consumed at higher temperatures. The deposition occurs selectively on pure silicon only, but not on silicon dioxide or silicon nitride; thus, the reaction is highly sensitive to contamination or substrate pre-treatment. The decomposition reaction is fast, but saturates when the tungsten layer thickness reaches 10–15 micrometers. The saturation occurs because the tungsten layer stops diffusion of WF_{6} molecules to the Si substrate, which is the only catalyst of molecular decomposition in this process.

If the deposition occurs not in an inert atmosphere but in an oxygen-containing atmosphere (air), then instead of tungsten, a tungsten oxide layer is produced.

=== Hydrogen ===
The deposition process occurs at temperatures between 300 and 800 °C and results in formation of hydrogen fluoride vapors:

WF_{6} + 3 H_{2} → W + 6 HF

The crystallinity of the produced tungsten layers can be controlled by altering the WF_{6}/H_{2} ratio and the substrate temperature: low ratios and temperatures result in (100)-oriented tungsten crystallites, whereas higher values favor the (111) orientation. Formation of HF is a drawback, as HF vapor is very aggressive and etches away most materials. Also, the deposited tungsten shows poor adhesion to the silicon dioxide which is the main passivation material in semiconductor electronics. Therefore, SiO_{2} has to be covered with an extra buffer layer prior to the tungsten deposition. On the other hand, etching by HF may be beneficial to remove unwanted impurity layers.

=== Silane and germane ===
The characteristic features of tungsten deposition from WF_{6}/SiH_{4} are high speed, good adhesion, and layer smoothness. The drawbacks are explosion hazard and high sensitivity of the deposition rate and morphology to the process parameters, such as mixing ratio, substrate temperature, etc. Therefore, silane is commonly used to create a thin tungsten nucleation layer. It is then switched to hydrogen, which slows down the deposition and cleans up the layer.

Deposition from a WF_{6}/GeH_{4} mixture is similar to that of WF_{6}/SiH_{4}, but the tungsten layer becomes contaminated with relatively (compared to Si) heavy germanium up to concentrations of 10–15%. This increases tungsten resistivity from about 5 to 200 μΩ·cm.

== Other applications ==
WF_{6} can be used for the production of tungsten carbide.

As a heavy gas, WF_{6} can be used as a buffer to control gas reactions. For example, it slows down the chemistry of the Ar/O_{2}/H_{2} flame and reduces the flame temperature.

== Safety ==
Tungsten hexafluoride is an extremely corrosive compound that attacks any tissue. Because of the formation of hydrofluoric acid upon reaction of WF_{6} with humidity, WF_{6} storage vessels have Teflon gaskets.
