= Tungsten(III) chloride =

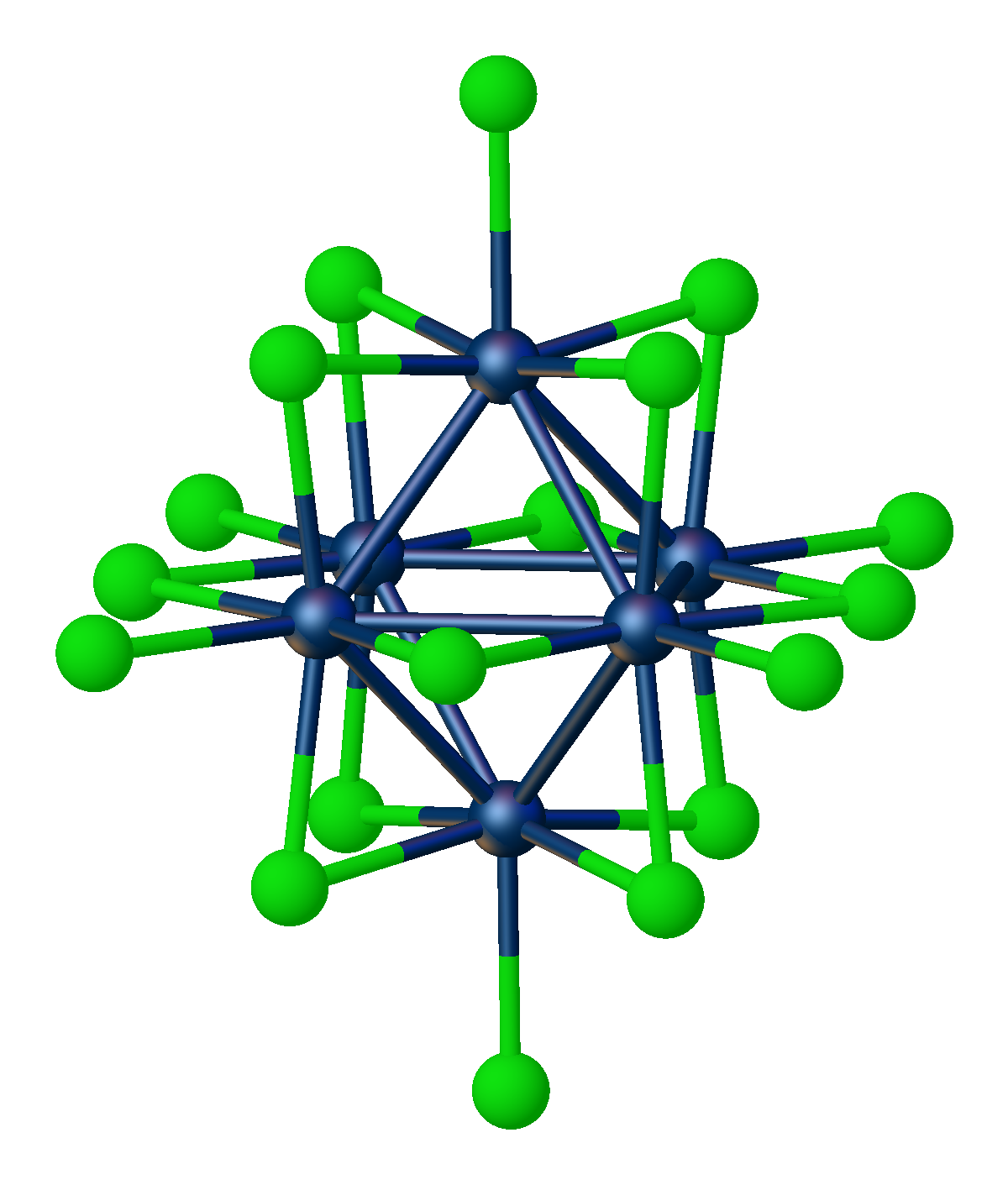

Identifiers
CAS Number	12371-22-1
3D model (JSmol)	Interactive image
ChemSpider	4418120
PubChem CID	5251191
CompTox Dashboard (EPA)	DTXSID50413323
- InChI: InChI=1S/3ClH.W/h3*1H;/q;;;+3/p-3 Key: KBSJJSOGQSGFRD-UHFFFAOYSA-K
- SMILES: Cl[W](Cl)Cl

Properties
Chemical formula	Cl_{18}W_{6}
Molar mass	1741.14 g·mol^{−1}
Appearance	yellow brown solid
Density	5.44 g·cm^{−3}
Melting point	550 °C (1,022 °F; 823 K)
- Except where otherwise noted, data are given for materials in their standard state (at 25 °C [77 °F], 100 kPa). Infobox references

Tungsten(III) chloride is the inorganic compound with the formula W_{6}Cl_{18}. It is a cluster compound. It is a brown solid, obtainable by chlorination of tungsten(II) chloride. Featuring twelve doubly bridging chloride ligands, the cluster adopts a structure related to the corresponding chlorides of niobium and tantalum. In contrast, W_{6}Cl_{12} features eight triply bridging chlorides.

A related mixed valence W(III)-W(IV) chloride is prepared by reduction of the hexachloride with bismuth:

9 WCl_{6} + 8 Bi → 3 W_{3}Cl_{10} + 8 BiCl_{3}
