= Molybdenum diarsenide =

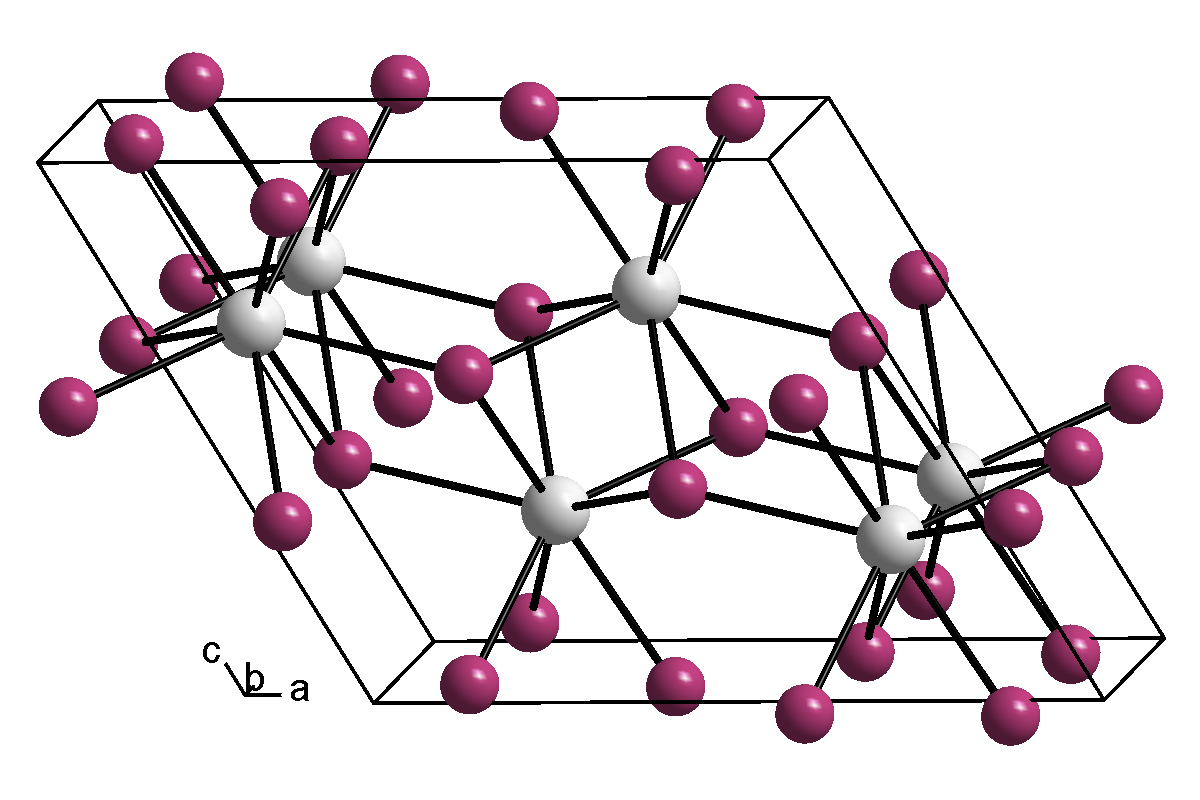

Identifiers
CAS Number	2006-24-5
3D model (JSmol)	Interactive image
- InChI: InChI=1S/2As.Mo Key: SUNOQBBRKUWPGB-UHFFFAOYSA-N
- SMILES: [Mo].[As].[As]

Properties
Chemical formula	As_{2}Mo
Molar mass	245.79 g·mol^{−1}
Appearance	black solid
Density	8.07 g·cm^{−3}
- Except where otherwise noted, data are given for materials in their standard state (at 25 °C [77 °F], 100 kPa). Infobox references

Molybdenum diarsenide is an arsenide of molybdenum, with the chemical formula MoAs_{2}. Other arsenides of molybdenum are Mo_{2}As_{3} and Mo_{5}As_{4}.

== Preparation ==
Molybdenum diarsenide can be prepared by the reaction of molybdenum and arsenic at 570 °C.

== Properties ==
Molybdenum diarsenide is a black solid, and is a superconductor at 0.41 K. It crystallises in the monoclinic crystal system, with space group (No. 12). It has the same structure as molybdenum diphosphide. It is insoluble in concentrated hydrochloric acid or hydrogen peroxide, but easily soluble in nitric acid, hot concentrated sulfuric acid and aqua regia.
