= Tungsten(V) bromide =

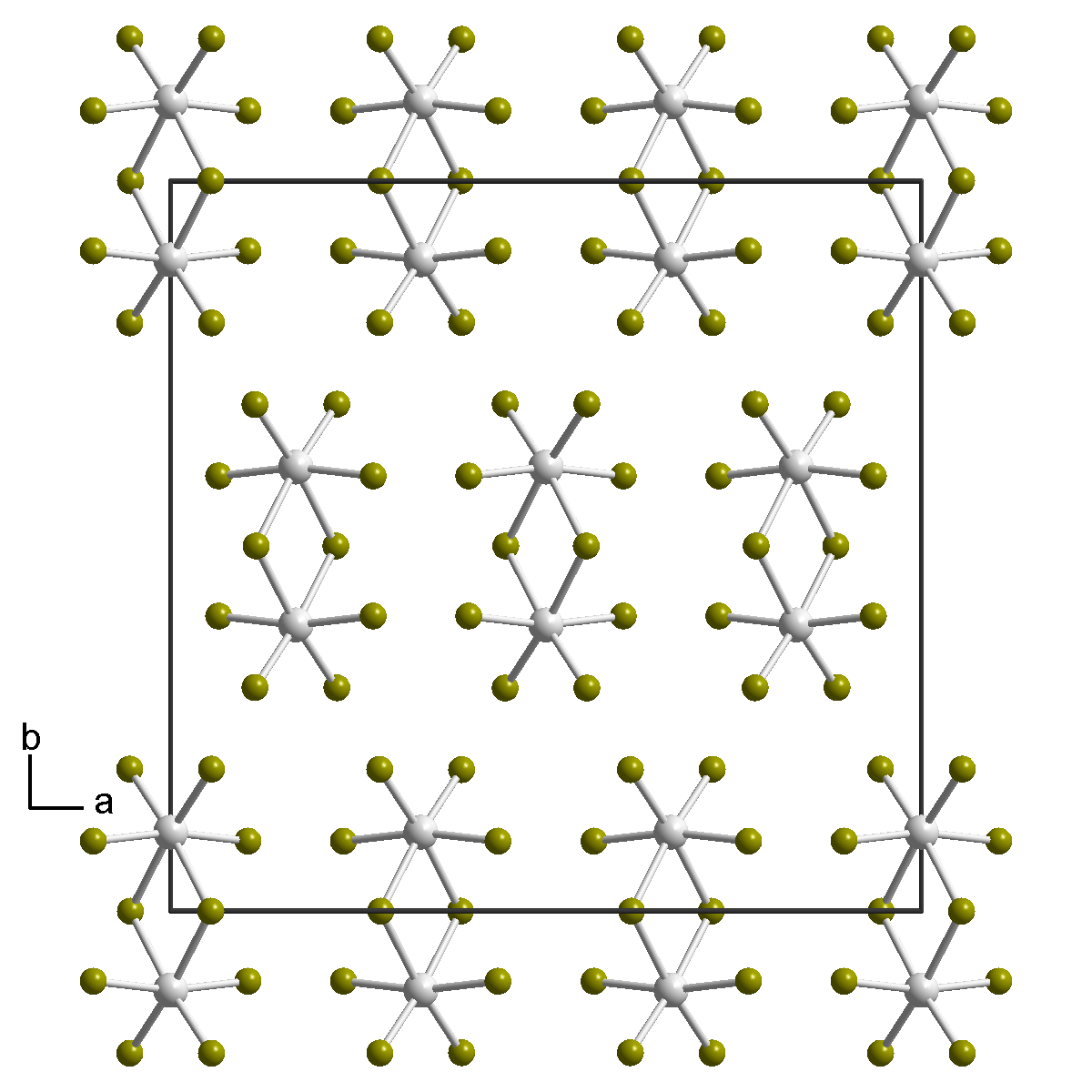
- Crystal structure of tungsten(V) bromide

Names
- Other names tungsten pentabromide, tungsten(V) bromide, pentabromotungsten

Identifiers
CAS Number	13470-11-6
3D model (JSmol)	Interactive image
ChemSpider	122990
PubChem CID	139467
CompTox Dashboard (EPA)	DTXSID70158865
- InChI: InChI=1S/5BrH.W/h5*1H;/q;;;;;+5/p-5 Key: UXVOMHPBSSIGNQ-UHFFFAOYSA-I; InChI=1S/5BrH.W/h5*1H;/q;;;;;+5/p-5
- SMILES: Br[W](Br)(Br)(Br)Br

Properties
Chemical formula	WBr_{5}, Br_{5}W
Molar mass	583.4 g/mol
Appearance	brown-black crystals hygroscopic
Melting point	286 °C (547 °F; 559 K)
Boiling point	333 °C (631 °F; 606 K)
Magnetic susceptibility (χ)	+250.0·10^{−6} cm^{3}/mol

Related compounds
Other anions	Tungsten(V) chloride
Other cations	Molybdenum(V) bromide
- Except where otherwise noted, data are given for materials in their standard state (at 25 °C [77 °F], 100 kPa). verify (what is ?) Infobox references

Tungsten(V) bromide is the inorganic compound with the empirical formula WBr_{5}. The compound consists of bioctahedral structure, with two bridging bromide ligands, so its molecular formula is W_{2}Br_{10}.

== Preparation and structure ==
Tungsten(V) bromide is prepared by treating tungsten powder with bromine in the temperature range 650-1000 °C. The product is often contaminated with tungsten hexabromide.

According to X-ray diffraction, the structure for tungsten pentabromide consists of an edge-shared bioctahedron.

== Reactions ==
Tungsten(V) bromide is the precursor to other tungsten compounds by reduction reactions. For example, tungsten(IV) bromide can be prepared by reduction with aluminium or tungsten. The WBr_{4} can be purified by chemical vapor transport.

3 WBr_{5} + Al → 3 WBr_{4} + AlBr_{3}

Excess tungsten pentabromide and aluminum tribromide are then removed by sublimation at 240 °C.

Tungsten(II) bromide can then be obtained heating the tetrabromide. At 450-500 °C, gaseous pentabromide is evolved leaving yellow-green residue of WBr_{2}. An analogous method can also be applied to the synthesis of tungsten(II) chloride.

=== Reductive substitution reactions ===
Because it is relatively easy to reduce tungsten pentahalides, they can be used as alternative synthetic routes to tungsten (IV) halide adducts. For example, reaction of WBr_{5} with pyridine gives WBr_{4}(py)_{2}.

2 WBr_{5} + 7 C_{5}H_{5}N → 2 WBr_{4}(C_{5}H_{5}N)_{2} + bipyridine + C_{5}H_{5}NHBr
