= Tungsten(VI) oxytetrabromide =

Identifiers
CAS Number	13520-77-9
3D model (JSmol)	Interactive image
ChemSpider	64878725
PubChem CID	139485
CompTox Dashboard (EPA)	DTXSID701306353
- InChI: InChI=1S/4BrH.O.W/h4*1H;;/q;;;;;+4/p-4 Key: KKUANYDOAOHBGB-UHFFFAOYSA-J; InChI=1S/4BrH.O.W/h4*1H;;/q;;;;;+4/p-4
- SMILES: O=[W](Br)(Br)(Br)Br

Properties
Chemical formula	WOBr_{4}
Molar mass	519.46 g·mol^{−1}
Appearance	red crystals
Density	5.5 g/cm^{3}
Melting point	277 °C (531 °F; 550 K)
Boiling point	327 °C (621 °F; 600 K)
Solubility in water	reacts

Structure
Crystal structure	tetragonal

Related compounds
Other anions	Tungsten(VI) oxytetrafluoride Tungsten(VI) oxytetrachloride
- Except where otherwise noted, data are given for materials in their standard state (at 25 °C [77 °F], 100 kPa). verify (what is ?) Infobox references

Tungsten(VI) oxytetrabromide is the inorganic compound with the formula WOBr_{4}. This a red-brown, hygroscopic solid sublimes at elevated temperatures. It forms adducts with Lewis bases. The solid consists of weakly associated square pyramidal monomers. The related tungsten(VI) oxytetrachloride has been more heavily studied. The compound is usually classified as an oxyhalide.

It can be produced by the reaction of tungsten hexabromide and tungsten trioxide:

2 WBr_{6} + WO_{3} → 3 WOBr_{4}
