= Octahedral cluster =

Octahedral clusters: Synthetic

Octahedral clusters are inorganic or organometallic cluster compounds composed of six metals in an octahedral array. Many types of compounds are known, but all are synthetic.

== Octahedral chalcogenide and halide clusters ==
These compounds are bound together by metal-metal bonding as well as two kinds of ligands. Ligands that span the faces or edges of the M_{6} core are labeled L_{i}, for inner (innen in the original German description), and those ligands attached only to one metal are labeled outer, or L_{a} for ausser. Typically, the outer ligands can be exchanged whereas the bridging ligands are more inert toward substitution.

=== Face-capped halide clusters ===
A particularly well studied example is Mo_{6}Cl_{14}^{2−}. This dianion is available as a variety of salts by treating the polymer molybdenum(II) chloride with sources of chloride, even hydrochloric acid. A related example is W_{6}Cl_{14}^{2−} anion, which is obtained by extraction of tungsten(II) chloride.

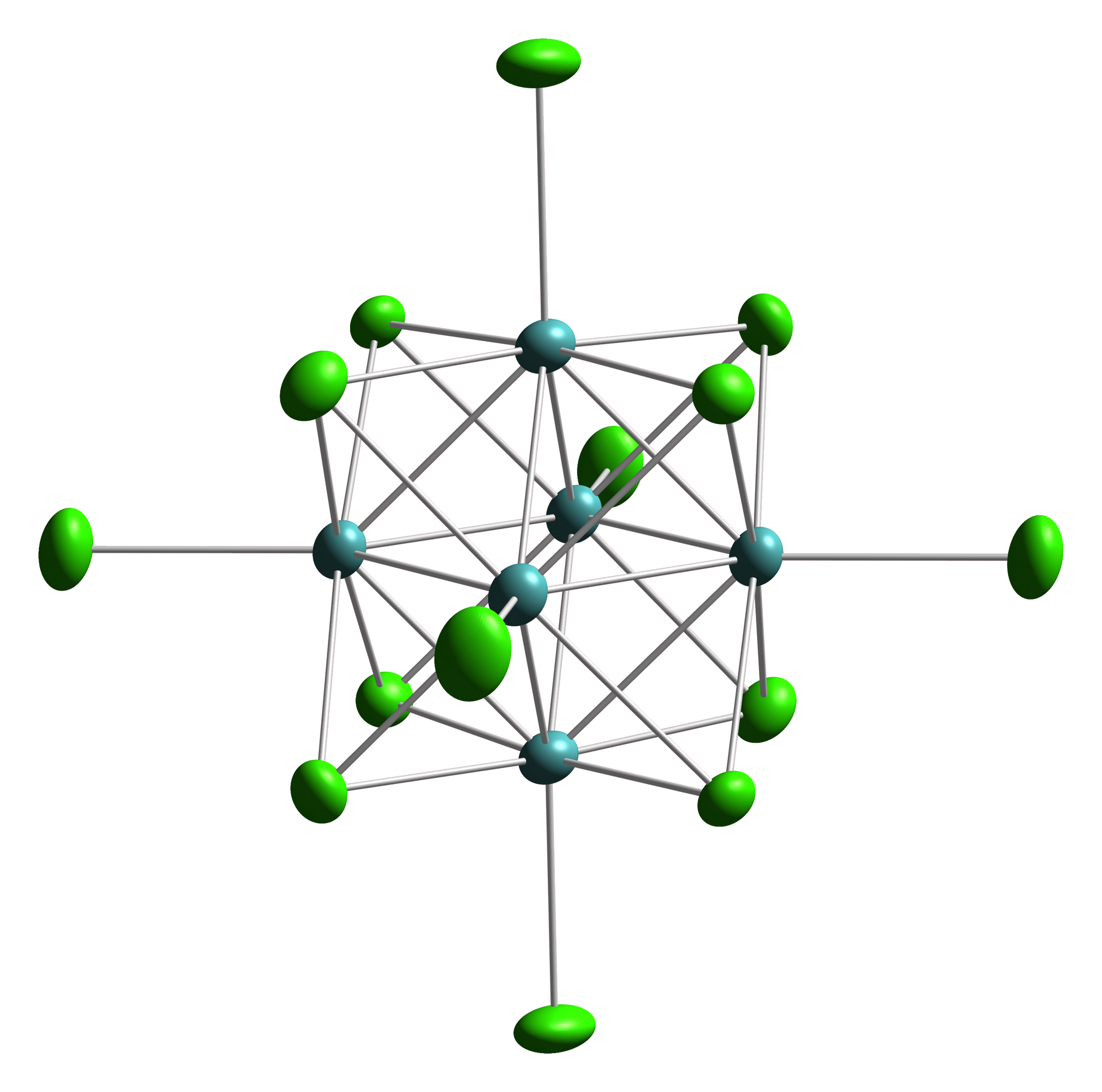
Structure of [M_{6}Cl_{14}]^{2−} (M = Mo or W).

=== Chalcohalide clusters ===
A related class of octahedral clusters are of the type M_{6}X_{8}L_{6} where M is a metal usually of group 6 or group 7, X is a ligand and more specifically an inner ligand of the chalcohalide group such as chloride or sulfide and L is an "outer ligand." The metal atoms define the vertices of an octahedron. The overall point group symmetry is O_{h}. Each face of the octahedron is capped with a chalcohalide and eight such atoms are at the corners of a cube. For this reason this geometry is called a face capped octahedral cluster. Examples of this type of clusters are the Re_{6}S_{8}Cl_{6}^{4−} anion.

=== Chevrel clusters ===
Chevrel phases or Chevrel clusters are of the type A_{x}Mo_{6}X_{8} with X sulfur or selenium and A_{x} an atom such as Pb. These materials are type II superconductors with relatively high critical fields. Such materials are prepared by high temperature (1100 °C) reactions of the chalcogen and Mo metal. Structurally related, soluble analogues have been prepared, e.g., Mo_{6}S_{8}(PEt_{3})_{6}.

=== Edge-capped halide clusters ===
With metals in group 4 or 5 a so-called edge-capped octahedral clusters are more common. Twelve halides are located along the edge of the octahedron and six are terminal. Examples of this structure type are tungsten(III) chloride, Ta_{6}Cl_{14}(H_{2}O)_{4}, Nb_{6}F_{15}, and Nb_{6}F_{18}^{2−}.

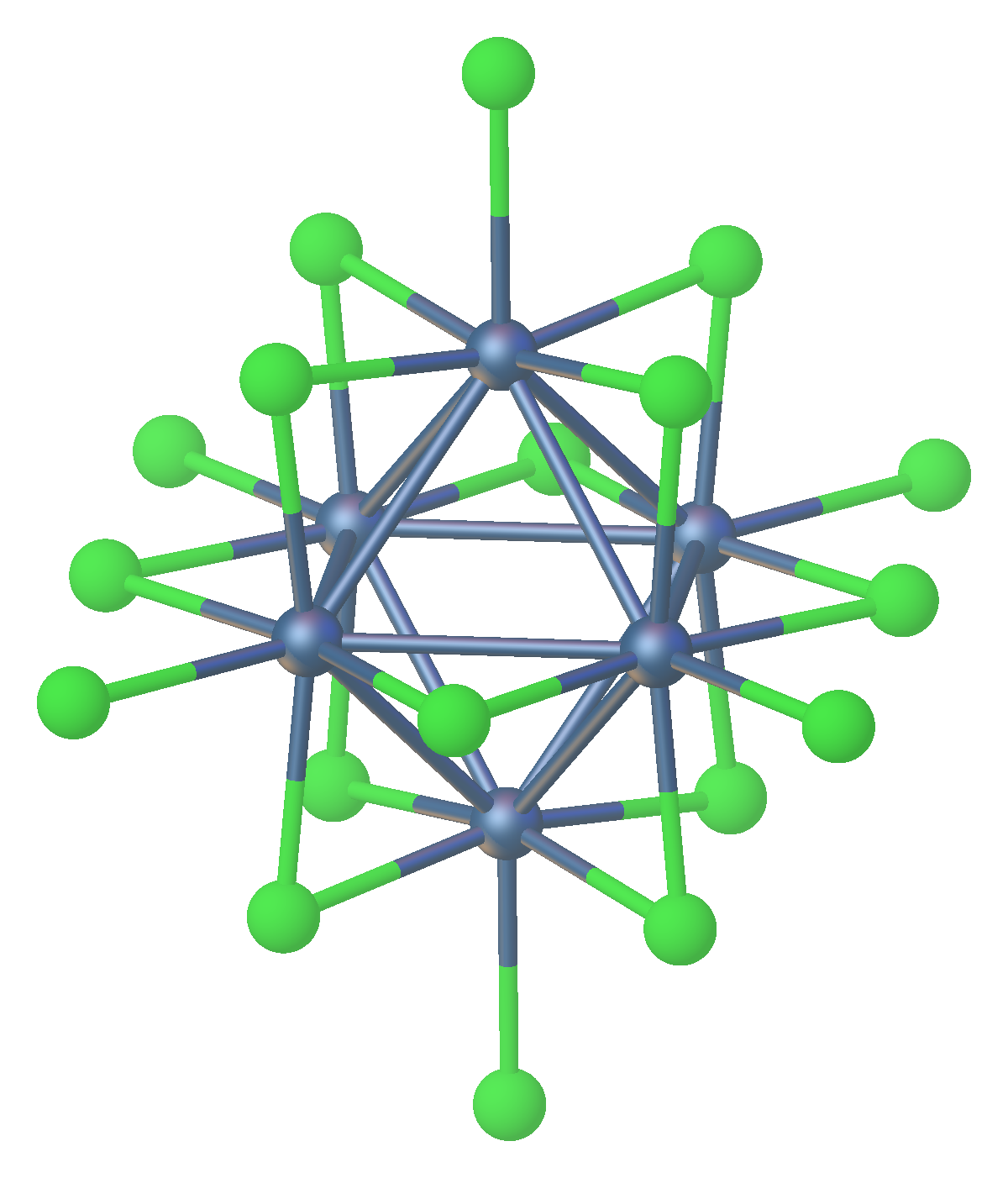
Structure of edge-capped octahedral clusters such as Ta_{6}Cl_{18}^{4−}.

Many of the early metal clusters can only be prepared when they incorporate interstitial atoms. One example is Zr_{6}CCl_{12}.

=== Tin(II) clusters ===
Octahedral clusters of tin(II) have been observed in several solid state compounds. The reaction of tin(II) salts with an aqueous base leads to the formation of tin(II) oxyhydroxide (Sn_{6}O_{4}(OH)_{4}), the structure of which comprises discrete Sn_{6}O_{4}(OH)_{4} clusters. In Sn_{6}O_{4}(OH)_{4} clusters, the six tin atoms form an octahedral array with alternate faces of the octahedron occupied by an oxide or hydroxide moiety, each bonded in a μ_{3}-binding mode to three tin atoms. Crystal structures have been reported for compounds with the formula Sn_{6}O_{4}(OR)_{4}, where R is an alkoxide such as a methyl or ethyl group.

Anionic tin(II) clusters [Sn_{6}O_{8}]^{4-} may form the close packed arrays as in the case of α-Sn_{6}SiO_{8}, which adopts the zinc blende structure, comprising a face-centred-cubic array of [Sn_{6}O_{8}]^{4-} clusters with Si^{4+} occupying half of the tetrahedral holes. A polymorph, β-Sn_{6}SiO_{8}, has been identified as a product of pewter corrosion in aqueous conditions, and is a structural analogue of wurtzite.

== Electron counting in octahedral halide and chalcogenide clusters ==
The species Mo_{6}Cl_{14}^{2−} feature Mo(II) (d^{4}) centers. Six Mo(II) centers gives rise to a total of 24 valence electrons, or 2e/Mo-Mo vector. More electron-deficient derivatives such as Ta_{6}Cl_{18}^{4−} have fewer d-electrons. For example, the naked cluster Ta_{6}^{14+}, the core of Ta_{6}Cl_{18}^{4−} would have 5(6) - 14 = 16 valence electrons. Fewer d-electrons result in weakened M-M bonding and the extended Ta---Ta distances accommodate doubly bridging halides.

== Other classes of octahedral clusters ==
In the area of metal carbonyl clusters, a prototypical octahedral cluster is [Fe_{6}C(CO)_{16}]^{2−}, which is obtained by heating iron pentacarbonyl with sodium. Some of the CO ligands are bridging and many are terminal. A carbide ligand resides at the center of the cluster. A variety of analogous compounds have been reported where some or all of the Fe centres are replaced by Ru, Mn and other metals.

Outside of carbonyl clusters, gold forms octahedral clusters.

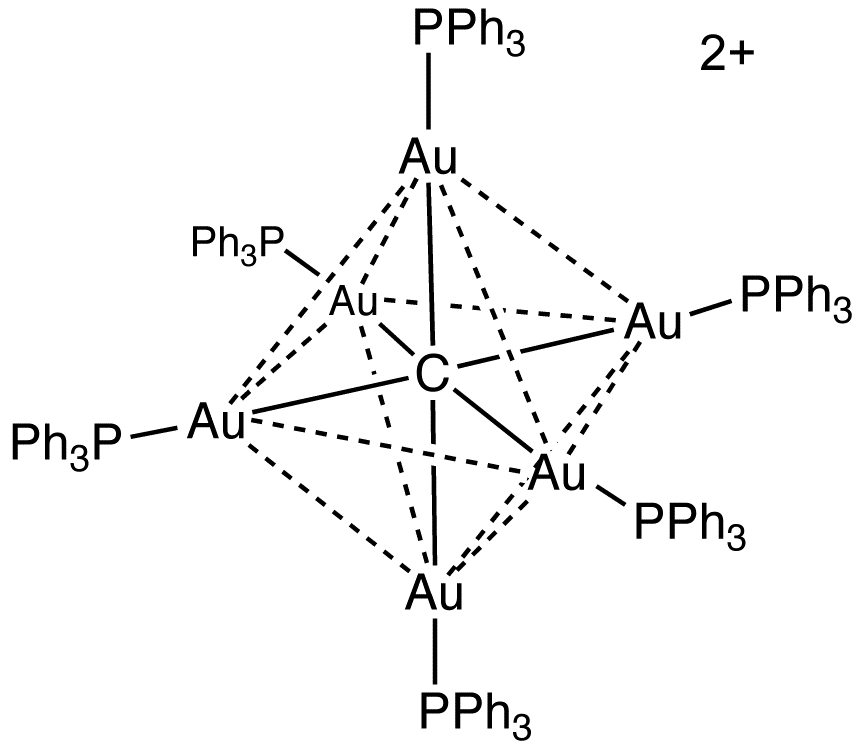
The complex [Au_{6}C(PPh_{3})_{6}]^{2+}, containing a carbon-gold core.
