= Hexachlorodisilane =

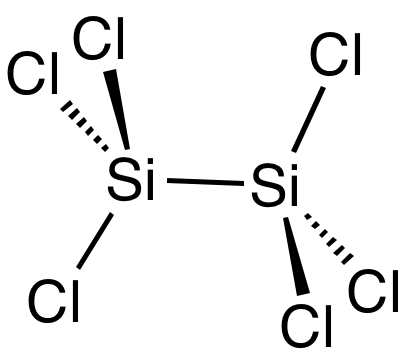

Names
- IUPAC name Hexachlorodisilane
- Other names Perchlorodisilane

Identifiers
CAS Number	13465-77-5
3D model (JSmol)	Interactive image
ChemSpider	75334
ECHA InfoCard	100.033.353
EC Number	236-704-1
PubChem CID	83497
UNII	9Z754456JM
CompTox Dashboard (EPA)	DTXSID0065488
- InChI: InChI=1S/Cl6Si2/c1-7(2,3)8(4,5)6 Key: LXEXBJXDGVGRAR-UHFFFAOYSA-N
- SMILES: [Si]([Si](Cl)(Cl)Cl)(Cl)(Cl)Cl

Properties
Chemical formula	Si_{2}Cl_{6}
Molar mass	268.88 g/mol
Appearance	Colorless liquid
Density	1.562 g/cm^{3} (25 °C)
Melting point	−1 °C (30 °F; 272 K)
Boiling point	144 °C (291 °F; 417 K)
- Except where otherwise noted, data are given for materials in their standard state (at 25 °C [77 °F], 100 kPa). Infobox references

Hexachlorodisilane is the inorganic compound with the chemical formula Si_{2}Cl_{6}. It is a colourless liquid that fumes in moist air. It has specialty applications in as a reagent and as a volatile precursor to silicon metal.

== Structure and synthesis ==
The molecule adopts a structure like ethane, with a single Si-Si bond length of 233 pm.

Hexachlorodisilane is produced in the chlorination of silicides such as e.g. calcium silicide. Idealized syntheses are as follows:

CaSi_{2} + 4 Cl_{2} → Si_{2}Cl_{6} + CaCl_{2}

A more selective synthesis is the decomposition of silicon tetrachloride to perchloropolysilanes via glow discharge, followed by rechlorination. Higher homologues (i.e., the bromide and iodide) cannot be produced this way, requiring instead dephenylation (Friedel-Crafts ipso substitution) of hexaphenyldisilane by the appropriate acyl halide with a catalytic aluminum salt.

== Reactions and uses ==
Hexachlorodisilane is stable under air or nitrogen at temperatures of at least up to 400°C for several hours, but decomposes to dodecachloroneopentasilane and silicon tetrachloride in presence of Lewis bases even at room temperature.

4 Si_{2}Cl_{6} → 3 SiCl_{4} + Si_{5}Cl_{12}

This conversion is useful in making silicon-based components of use in semiconducting devices including photovoltaic cells.

The compound is also useful reagent for the deoxygenation reactions, such as this general process involving a phosphine oxide:

Si_{2}Cl_{6} + OPR_{3} → OSi_{2}Cl_{6} + PR_{3}
