= Tungsten pentafluoride =

Tungsten(V) fluoride
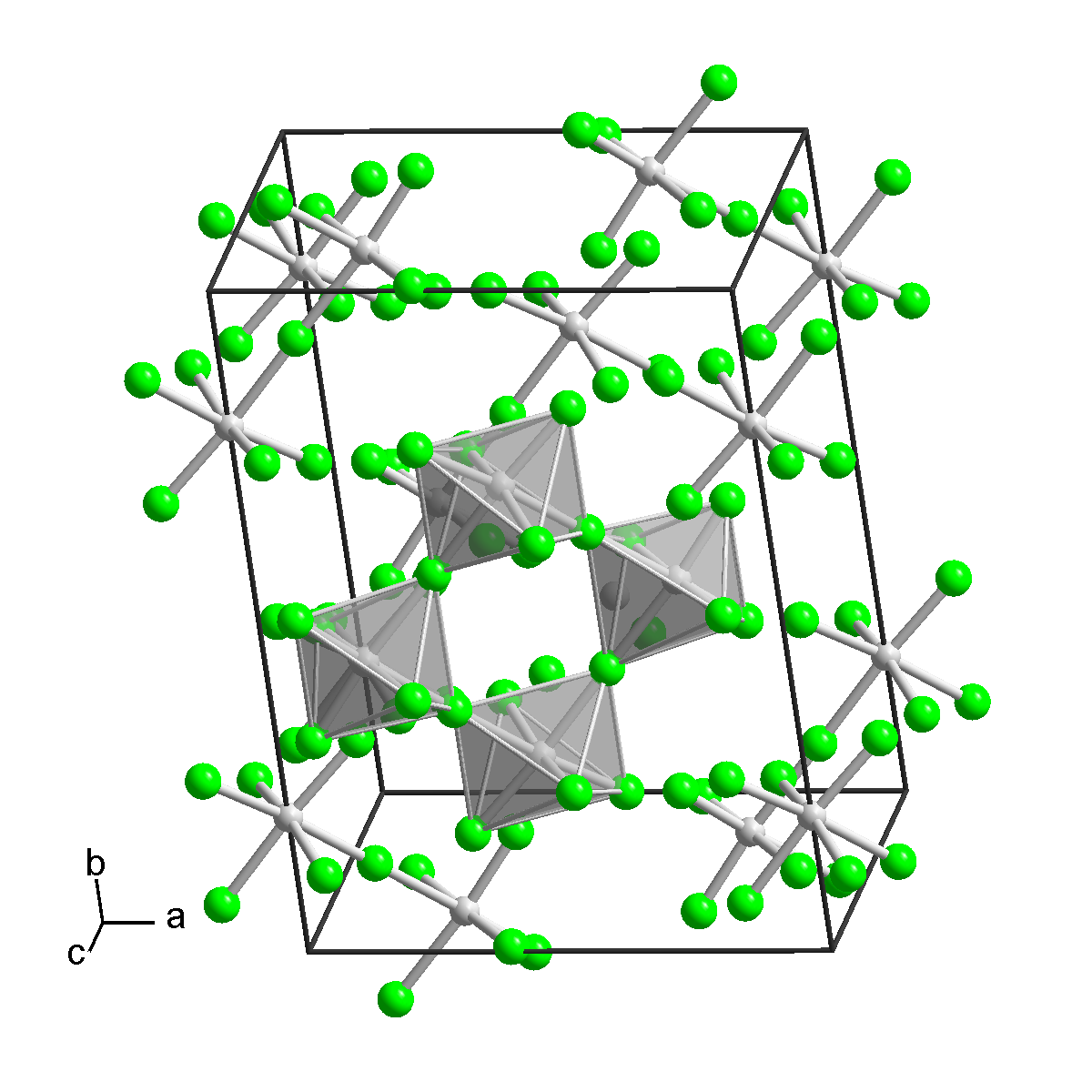
- Tungsten(V) fluoride

Names
- IUPAC names Tungsten(V) fluoride Tungsten pentafluoride

Identifiers
CAS Number	19357-83-6
3D model (JSmol)	Interactive image
ChemSpider	123939
PubChem CID	140522
CompTox Dashboard (EPA)	DTXSID70172965
- InChI: InChI=1S/5FH.W/h5*1H;/q;;;;;+5/p-5 Key: QHIRVZBLPRTQQO-UHFFFAOYSA-I
- SMILES: F[W](F)(F)(F)F

Properties
Chemical formula	F_{5}W
Molar mass	278.83 g·mol^{−1}
Appearance	yellow solid
Density	5.01 g/cm^{3}
Melting point	66 °C (151 °F; 339 K)
Boiling point	215.6 °C (420.1 °F; 488.8 K)

Hazards
- Occupational safety and health (OHS/OSH)
Main hazards	oxidizer, hydrolyzes to release HF
Flash point	Non-flammable

Related compounds
Related compounds	TaCl_{5} NbCl_{5} MoF_{5}
- Except where otherwise noted, data are given for materials in their standard state (at 25 °C [77 °F], 100 kPa). Infobox references

Tungsten(V) fluoride is an inorganic compound with the formula WF_{5}. It is a hygroscopic yellow solid. Like most pentafluorides, it adopts a tetrameric structure, consisting of [WF_{5}]_{4} molecules. In this way, each W center achieves octahedral coordination.

== Production ==
Tungsten(V) fluoride is produced by the reaction of tungsten and tungsten hexafluoride:

W + 5 WF_{6} → 6 WF_{5}

At room temperature, it disproportionates to the tetra- and hexafluoride:

2 WF_{5} → WF_{4} + WF_{6}
