= Tungsten(II) chloride =

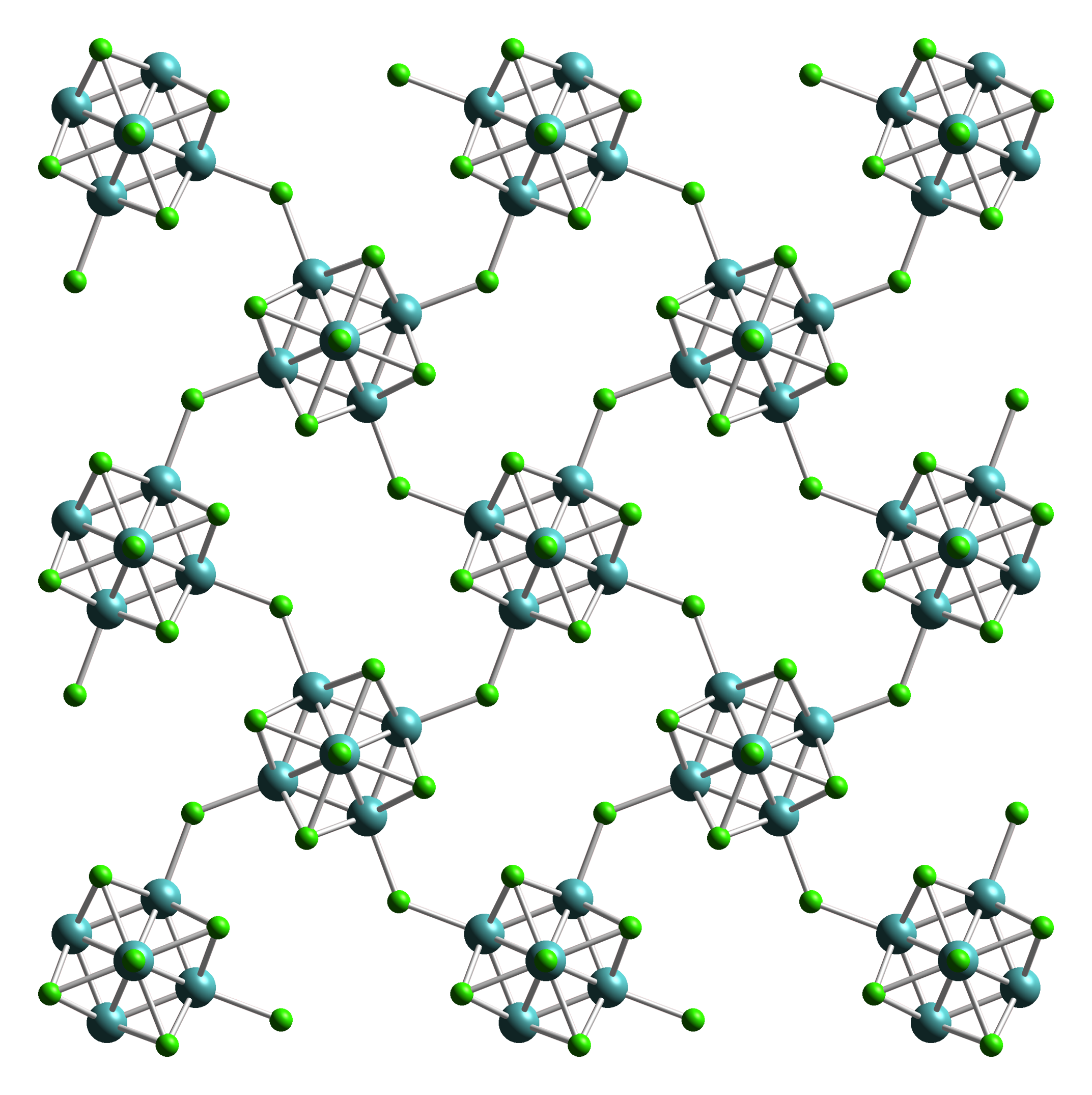

Identifiers
CAS Number	12052-19-6
3D model (JSmol)	Interactive image
ChemSpider	122844
PubChem CID	101282746
- InChI: InChI=1S/2ClH.W/h2*1H;/q;;+2/p-2 Key: UDJQAOMQLIIJIE-UHFFFAOYSA-L
- SMILES: [Cl-].[Cl-].[W+2]

Properties
Chemical formula	Cl_{12}W_{6}
Molar mass	1528.44 g·mol^{−1}
Appearance	yellow brown solid
Density	5.44 g·cm^{−3}
- Except where otherwise noted, data are given for materials in their standard state (at 25 °C [77 °F], 100 kPa). Infobox references

Tungsten(II) chloride is the inorganic compound with the formula W_{6}Cl_{12}. It is a polymeric cluster compound. The material dissolves in concentrated hydrochloric acid, forming (H_{3}O)_{2}[W_{6}Cl_{14}](H_{2}O)_{x}. Heating this salt gives yellow-brown W_{6}Cl_{12}. The structural chemistry resembles that observed for molybdenum(II) chloride.

Tungsten(II) chloride is prepared by reduction of the hexachloride. Bismuth is a typical reductant:

6 WCl_{6} + 8 Bi → W_{6}Cl_{12} + 8 BiCl_{3}

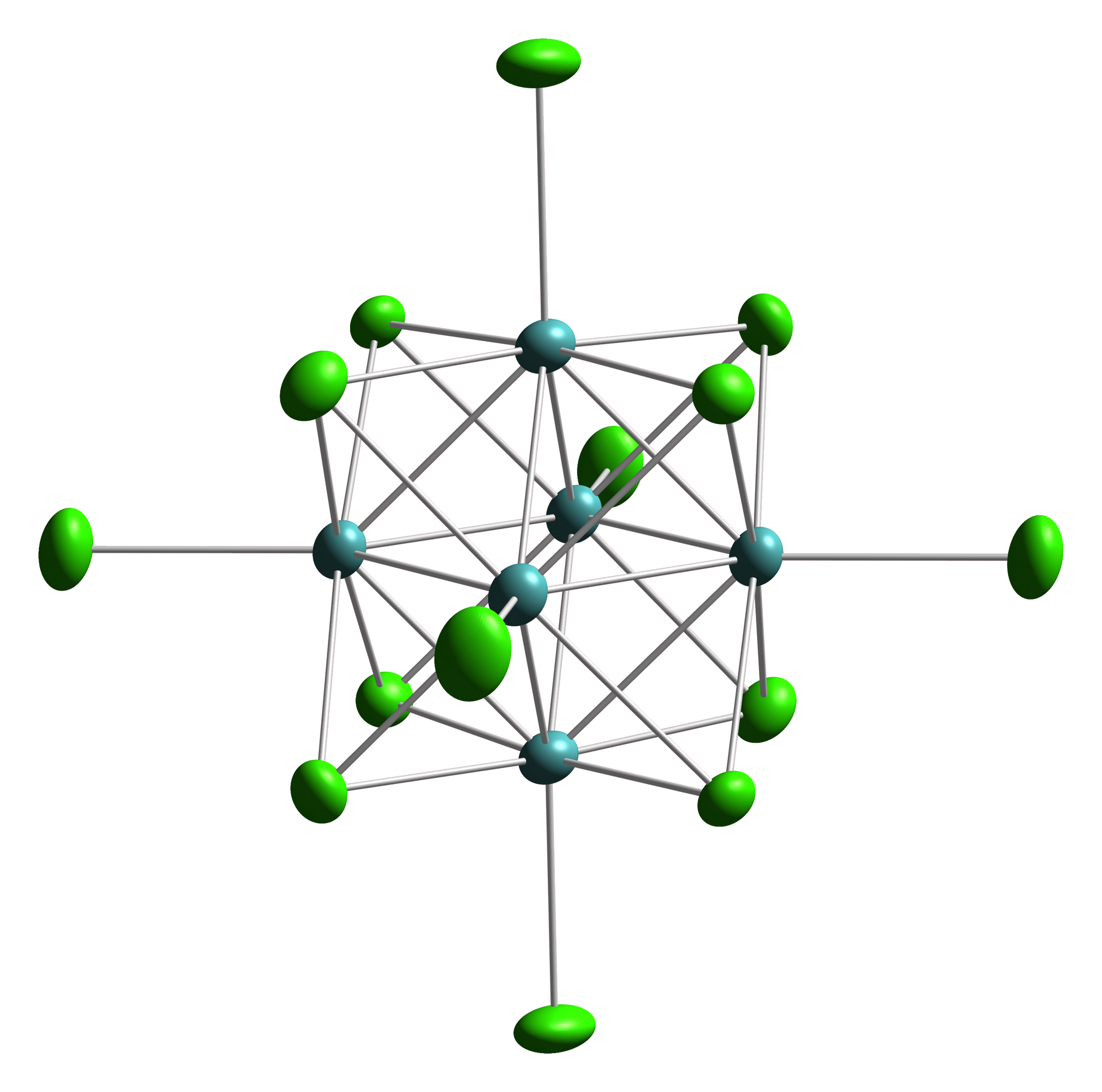
Structure of the cluster anion [W_{6}Cl_{14}]^{2−}

.
