= Molybdenum chloride =

Molybdenum chloride can refer to:

- Molybdenum(II) chloride (molybdenum dichloride), MoCl_{2}
- Molybdenum(III) chloride (molybdenum trichloride), MoCl_{3}
- Molybdenum(IV) chloride (molybdenum tetrachloride), MoCl_{4}
- Molybdenum(V) chloride (molybdenum pentachloride), MoCl_{5}
- Molybdenum(VI) chloride (molybdenum hexachloride), MoCl_{6}
