= Molybdenum bromide =

The molybdenum bromides include:

- Molybdenum(IV) bromide, a black solid with formula MoBr_{4}
- Molybdenum(III) bromide, a black solid with formula MoBr_{3}
- Molybdenum(II) bromide, a yellow-red solid with formula MoBr_{2}
