= Molybdenum fluoride =

Molybdenum fluoride can refer to

- Molybdenum(IV) fluoride (molybdenum tetrafluoride, MoF_{4}), a green ionic solid
- Molybdenum(V) fluoride (molybdenum pentafluoride, MoF_{5}), a yellow ionic solid
- Molybdenum(VI) fluoride (molybdenum hexafluoride, MoF_{6}), a white molecular solid or colorless liquid
