= Transition metal chloride complex =

Coordination complex

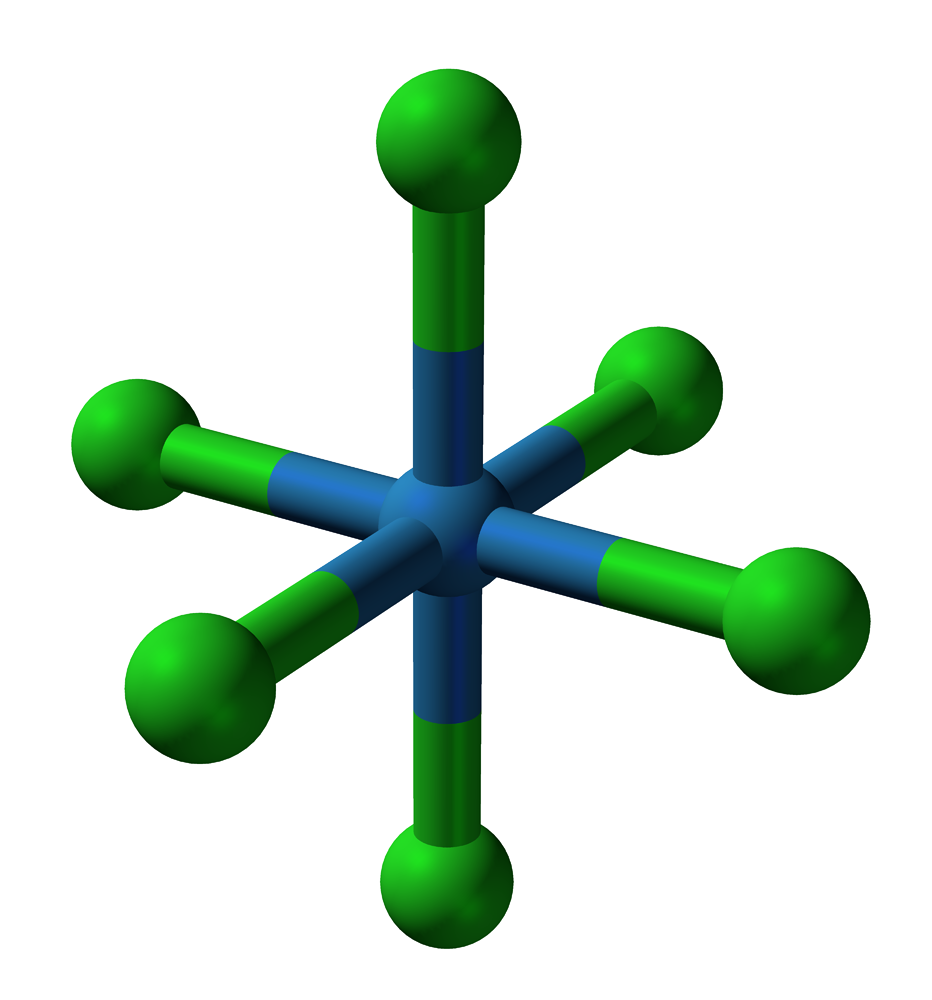
Octahedral molecular geometry is a common structural motif for homoleptic metal chloride complexes. Examples include MCl_{6} (M = Mo, W), [MCl_{6}]^{−} (M = Nb, Ta, Mo, W, Re), [MCl_{6}]^{2−} (M = Ti Zr, Hf, Mo, Mn, Re, Ir, Pd, Pt), and [MCl_{6}]^{3−} (M = Ru Os, Rh, Ir).

In chemistry, a transition metal chloride complex is a coordination complex that consists of a transition metal coordinated to one or more chloride ligand. The class of complexes is extensive.

== Bonding ==
Halides are X-type ligands in coordination chemistry. They are both σ- and π-donors. Chloride is commonly found as both a terminal ligand and a bridging ligand. The halide ligands are weak field ligands. Due to a smaller crystal field splitting energy, the homoleptic halide complexes of the first transition series are all high spin. Only [CrCl_{6}]^{3−} is exchange inert.

Homoleptic metal halide complexes are known with several stoichiometries, but the main ones are the hexahalometallates and the tetrahalometallates. The hexahalides adopt octahedral coordination geometry, whereas the tetrahalides are usually tetrahedral. Square planar tetrahalides are known for Pd(II), Pt(II), and Au(III). Examples with 2- and 3-coordination are common for Au(I), Cu(I), and Ag(I).

Due to the presence of filled p_{π} orbitals, halide ligands on transition metals are able to reinforce π-backbonding onto a π-acid. They are also known to labilize cis-ligands.

== Homoleptic complexes ==
Homoleptic complexes (complexes with only chloride ligands) are often common reagents. Almost all examples are anions.

=== 1st row ===
1st transition series
| Complex | colour | electron config. | structure | geometry | comments |
|---|---|---|---|---|---|
| TiCl_{4} | colourless | (t_{2g})^{0} | | tetrahedral | |
| [Ti_{2}Cl_{9}]^{−} | white/colourless | d^{0}d^{0} | | face-sharing bioctahedron | Ti–Cl(terminal) = 2.23 Å, 2.45 (terminal); N(PCl_{3})^{+}_{2} salt |
| [Ti_{2}Cl_{9}]^{3−} | orange | (t_{2g})^{1}(t_{2g})^{1} | | face-sharing bioctahedron | Ti–Ti = 3.22 Å Ti–Cl(terminal) = 2.32–2.35 Å, Ti–Cl(bridge) = 2.42–2.55 Å ((NEt^{+}_{4})_{3})_{3} salt |
| [Ti_{2}Cl_{10}]^{2−} | colourless | d^{0}d^{0} | | bioctahedral | |
| [Ti_{3}Cl_{12}]^{3−} | green | (t_{2g})^{1}(t_{2g})^{1}(t_{2g})^{1} | | face-sharing trioctahedron | Ti–Ti = 3.19, 3.10 Å (terminal); Ti–Cl(terminal) = 2.36 Å (terminal), Ti–Cl(bridge) = 2.50 Å ((PPh^{+}_{4})_{3})_{3} salt |
| [TiCl_{6}]^{2−} | yellow | d^{0} | | octahedral | Ti–Cl = 2.33 Å PPh^{+}_{4} salt |
| VCl_{4} | red | (t_{2g})^{1} | | tetrahedral | V−Cl = 2.29 Å |
| V_{2}Cl_{10} | violet | (t_{2g})^{0} | | edge-shared bioctahedron | V−Cl(bridging) = 2.48 Å V−Cl(terminal) = 2.16–2.21 Å |
| [VCl_{6}]^{2−} | red | (t_{2g})^{1} | | octahedral | V−Cl = 2.29 Å |
| [CrCl_{6}]^{3−} | pink | (t_{2g})^{3} | | octahedral | |
| [Cr_{2}Cl_{9}]^{3−} | red | (d^{3})^{2} | | face-sharing bioctahedron | Cr–Cl(terminal) = 2.31 Å, 2.42 (terminal); Et_{2}NH^{+}_{2} salt |
| [MnCl_{4}]^{2−} | pale pink to white | (e_{g})^{2}(t_{2g})^{3} | | tetrahedral | Mn–Cl bond length = 2.3731–2.3830 Å |
| [MnCl_{6}]^{2−} | dark red | (t_{2g})^{3}(e_{g})^{1} | | octahedral | Mn–Cl distance = 2.28 Å K^{+} salt – salt is isostructural with K_{2}PtCl_{6} |
| [MnCl_{6}]^{3−} | brown | (t_{2g})^{3}(e_{g})^{1} | | octahedral | |
| [Mn_{2}Cl_{6}]^{2−} | yellow-green | (e_{g})^{2}(t_{2g})^{3} | | bitetrahedral | Mn–Cl(terminal) bond length = 2.24 Å Mn–Cl(terminal) bond length = 2.39 Å (PPN^{+})_{2} salt |
| [Mn_{3}Cl_{12}]^{6−} | pink | (t_{2g})^{3}(e_{g})^{2} | | cofacial trioctahedron | (C(NH_{2})^{+}_{3})_{6} salt |
| [FeCl_{4}]^{2−} | cream | (e_{g})^{3}(t_{2g})^{3} | | tetrahedral Et_{4}N^{+} salt | |
| [FeCl_{4}]^{−} | | (e_{g})^{2}(t_{2g})^{3} | | tetrahedral | Fe–Cl bond length = 2.19 Å |
| [FeCl_{6}]^{3−} | orange | (t_{2g})^{3}(e_{g})^{2} | | octahedral | |
| [Fe_{2}Cl_{6}]^{2−} | pale yellow | (e_{g})^{2}(t_{2g})^{3} | | bitetrahedral | Fe–Cl(terminal) bond length = 2.24 Å Fe–Cl(terminal) bond length = 2.39 Å (PPN^{+})_{2} salt |
| [CoCl_{4}]^{2−} | blue | (e_{g})^{4}(t_{2g})^{3} | | tetrahedral | |
| [Co_{2}Cl_{6}]^{2−} | blue | (e_{g})^{4}(t_{2g})^{3} | | bitetrahedral | Mn–Cl(terminal) bond length = 2.24 Å Co–Cl(terminal) bond length = 2.35 Å (PPN^{+})_{2} salt |
| [NiCl_{4}]^{2−} | blue | (e_{g})^{4}(t_{2g})^{4} | | tetrahedral | Ni–Cl bond length = 2.28 Å (Et_{4}N^{+})_{2} salt |
| [Ni_{3}Cl_{12}]^{6−} | orange | (t_{2g})^{6}(e_{g})^{2} | | confacial trioctahedral | ((Me_{2}NH^{+}_{2})_{2})_{8} salt double salt with two Cl^{−} Ni–Cl bond length = 2.36–2.38 Å |
| [CuCl_{4}]^{2−} | orange yellow (flattened tetrahedral) green (square planar) | (t_{2g})^{6}(e_{g})^{3} | | flattened tetrahedral or square planar | Cu–Cl bond length = 2.24 Å |
| [Cu_{2}Cl_{6}]^{2−} | red | [(t_{2g})^{6}(e_{g})^{3}]_{2} | | edge-shared bis(square planar) | Cu–Cl(terminal) = 2.24 Å Cu–Cl(bridging) = 2.31 Å |
| [ZnCl_{4}]^{2−} | white/colorless | d^{10} | | tetrahedral | |

=== 2nd row ===
Some homoleptic complexes of the second row transition metals feature metal-metal bonds.

2nd transition series
| Complex | colour | electron config. | structure | geometry | comments |
|---|---|---|---|---|---|
| [ZrCl_{6}]^{2−} | yellow | d^{0} | | octahedral | Zr–Cl distance = 2.460 Å (Me_{4}N^{+})_{2} salt |
| [Zr_{2}Cl_{10}]^{2−} | colorless | (d^{0})^{2} | | edge-shared bioctahedral | Zr–Cl = 2.36 Å (terminal), 2.43 Å (bridging); N(PCl_{3})^{+}_{2} salt |
| Nb_{2}Cl_{10} | yellow | (d^{0})^{2} | | edge-shared bioctahedral [Nb_{2}Cl_{10}] | 3.99 Å |
| [NbCl_{6}]^{−} | yellow | d^{0} | | octahedral | Nb–Cl = 2.34 Å N(PCl_{3})^{+}_{2} salt |
| [Nb_{6}Cl_{18}]^{2−} | black | (d^{2})^{4}(d^{3})^{2} (14 cluster electrons) | | cluster Nb···Nb bonding | Nb–Cl = 2.92 Å (K^{+})2 salt |
| MoCl_{6} | black | d^{0} | | octahedron | Mo−Cl = 2.28–2.31 Å |
| [MoCl_{6}]^{2−} | yellow | (t_{2g})^{2} | | octahedron | Mo−Cl = 2.37, 2.38, 2.27 Å |
| [MoCl_{6}]^{3−} | pink | (t_{2g})^{3} | | octahedral | |
| [Mo_{2}Cl_{8}]^{4−} | purple | 2(d^{4}) | | Mo-Mo quadruple bond | |
| [Mo_{2}Cl_{9}]^{3−} | | 2(d^{3}) | | face-shared bioctahedral | Mo–Mo (triple) bond length = 2.65 Å Mo–Cl (terminal) bond length = 2.38 Å Mo–Cl (bridging) bond length = 2.49 Å |
| Mo_{2}Cl_{10} | green | (d^{1})_{2} | | edge-sharing bioctahedra | |
| [Mo_{2}Cl_{10}]^{2−} | | (d^{2})_{2} | | edge-sharing bioctahedra | |
| [Mo_{5}Cl_{13}]^{2−} | brown | d^{2}d^{2}d^{2}d^{2}d^{3} | | incomplete octahedron | |
| [Mo_{6}Cl_{14}]^{2−} | yellow | d^{4} | | octahedral cluster | (4-HOPyH^{+})_{2} salt |
| [TcCl_{6}]^{2−} | yellow | (t_{2g})^{3} | | octahedron | Tc–Cl = 2.35 Å for AsPh^{+}_{4} salt |
| [Tc_{2}Cl_{8}]^{2−} | green | (t_{2g})^{4} | | Tc–Tc quadruple bond | Tc–Tc = 2.16, Tc–Cl = 2.34 Å for NBu^{+}_{4} salt |
| [RuCl_{6}]^{2−} | brown | (t_{2g})^{4} | | octahedral | (EtPPh^{+}_{3})_{2} salt |
| [Ru_{2}Cl_{9}]^{3−} | red | [(t_{2g})^{5}]_{2} | | cofacial bioctahedral | Ru–Ru bond length = 2.71 Å Ru–Cl(terminal) = 2.35 Å, Ru–Cl(bridging) = 2.36 Å ((Et_{4}N)^{+})_{3} salt |
| [Ru_{3}Cl_{12}]^{4−} | green | (d^{5})_{2}(d^{6}) | | cofacial trioctahedral | Ru–Ru bond lengths = 2.86 Å Ru–Cl bond lengths = 2.37–2.39 Å (Et_{4}N^{+})_{2}(H_{7}O^{+}_{3})_{2} salt |
| [RhCl_{6}]^{3−} | red | (t_{2g})^{6} | | octahedral | H_{2}N^{+}(CH_{2}CH_{2}NH^{+}_{3})_{2} salt |
| [Rh_{2}Cl_{9}]^{3−} | red-brown | (t_{2g})^{6} | | octahedral | Rh–Cl(terminal) = 2.30 Å, Rh–Cl(terminal) = 2.40 Å ((Me_{3}CH_{2}Ph)^{+})_{3} salt |
| [PdCl_{4}]^{2−} | brown | d^{8} | | square planar | |
| [Pd_{2}Cl_{6}]^{2−} | red ((Et_{4}N^{+})_{2} salt) | d^{8} | | square planar | |
| [Pd_{3}Cl_{8}]^{2−} | orange brown ((Bu_{4}N^{+})_{2} salt) | d^{8} | | square planar | |
| [PdCl_{6}]^{2−} | brown | d^{6} | | octahedral | Pd(IV) |
| [Pd_{6}Cl_{12}] | yellow-brown | d^{8} | | square planar | |
| [AgCl_{2}]^{−} | white/colorless | d^{10} | | linear | salt of [K(2.2.2-crypt)]^{+} |
| [CdCl_{4}]^{2−} | white/colorless | d^{10} | | tetrahedral | Et_{4}N^{+} salt Cd–Cl distance is 2.43 Å |
| [Cd_{2}Cl_{6}]^{2−} | white/colorless | d^{10} | | edge-shared bitetrahedron | C_{6}N_{3}(4-C_{5}H_{4}N)^{3+}_{3} salt |
| [Cd_{3}Cl_{12}]^{6−} | white/colorless | d^{10} | | octahedral (central Cd) pentacoordinate (terminal Cd) cofactial trioctahedral | C_{6}N_{3}(4-C_{5}H_{4}N)^{3+}_{3} salt (3,8-Diammonium-6-phenylphenanthridine^{3+})_{2} |
| [Cd_{6}Cl_{19}]^{7−} | white/colorless | d^{10} | | octahedron of octahedra | (4,4′-C_{6}H_{3}(2-Et)NH^{+}_{3})_{2} salt |

=== 3rd row ===
3rd transition series
| Complex | colour | electron config. | structure | geometry | comments |
|---|---|---|---|---|---|
| [HfCl_{6}]^{2−} | white | d^{0} | | octahedral | Hf–Cl distance = 2.448 Å (Me_{4}N^{+})_{2} salt |
| [Hf_{2}Cl_{10}]^{2−} | colorless/white | d^{0} | | edge-shared bioctahedral | |
| [Hf_{2}Cl_{9}]^{−} | colorless/white | (d^{0})^{2} | | face-shared bioctahedral | |
| [TaCl_{5}] | white | d^{0} | | edge-shared bioctahedral | |
| [TaCl_{6}]^{−} | white/colourless | d^{0} | | octahedral | Ta–Cl = 2.34 Å N(PCl_{3})^{+}_{2} salt |
| [Ta_{6}Cl_{18}]^{2−} | green | d^{0} | | octahedral | Ta–Ta = 2.34 Å (H^{+})_{2} salt hexahydrate |
| WCl_{6} | blue | d^{0} | | octahedral | 2.24–2.26 Å |
| [WCl_{6}]^{2−} | | (t_{2g})^{2} | | octahedral | W–Cl distances range from 2.34 to 2.37 Å PPh^{+}_{4} salt |
| [WCl_{6}]^{−} | | (t_{2g})^{1} | | octahedral | W–Cl distance = 2.32 Å Et_{4}N^{+} salt |
| W_{2}Cl_{10} | black | (t_{2g}^{1})_{2} | | bioctahedral | W–W distance = 3.814 Å |
| [W_{2}Cl_{8}]^{4−} | blue | 2(d^{4}) | | W–W quadruple bond | W–W distance = 2.259 Å [Na(tmeda)^{+}]_{4} salt |
| [W_{2}Cl_{9}]^{2−} | | d^{3}d^{2} | | face-sharing bioctahedral | W–W distance = 2.54 Å W–Cl(terminal) = 2.36 Å, W–Cl(bridge) = 2.45 Å (PPN^{+})_{2} salt |
| [W_{2}Cl_{9}]^{3−} | | d^{3}d^{3} | | octahedral | W–Cl distance = 2.32 Å Et_{4}N^{+} salt |
| [W_{3}Cl_{13}]^{3−} | | d^{3}, d^{3}, d^{4} | | [W_{3}(μ_{3}-Cl)(μ-Cl)_{3}Cl_{9}]^{3−} | W–W distances = 2.84 Å |
| [W_{3}Cl_{13}]^{2−} | | d^{3}, d^{4}, d^{4} | | [W_{3}(μ_{3}-Cl)(μ-Cl)_{3}Cl_{9}]^{2−} | W–W distances = 2.78 Å |
| [W_{6}Cl_{14}]^{2−} | yellow | (d^{4})_{6} | | see Mo_{6}Cl_{12} | |
| [ReCl_{6}]^{−} | red-brown | (t_{2g})^{2} | | octahedral | Re–Cl distance = 2.24–2.31 Å PPh^{+}_{4} salt) |
| [ReCl_{6}] | | (t_{2g})^{1} | | octahedral | Re–Cl distance = 2.263(6) Å |
| [ReCl_{6}]^{2−} | green | (t_{2g})^{3} | | octahedral | Re–Cl distance = 2.35–2.38 Å (PPN^{+})_{2} salt |
| [Re_{2}Cl_{9}]^{2−} | | (t_{2g})^{3}(t_{2g})^{4} | | face-sharing bioctahedral | Re–Re distance = 2.48 Å Re–Cl distances = 2.42 Å (bridge), 2.33 Å (terminal) (Et_{4}N^{+})_{2} salt |
| [Re_{2}Cl_{9}]^{−} | | ((t_{2g})^{3})_{2} | | face-sharing bioctahedral | Re–Re distance = 2.70 Å Re–Cl distances = 2.41 (bridge), 2.28 Å (terminal); Bu_{4}N^{+} salt |
| [OsCl_{6}]^{−} | dark green | (t_{2g})^{3} | | octahedral | Os–Cl = 2.30 Å for Et_{4}N^{+} and Ph_{4}P^{+} salts |
| [OsCl_{6}]^{2−} | yellow-orange | (t_{2g})^{4} | | octahedral | Os–Cl distance 2.33 Å |
| [Os_{2}Cl_{8}]^{2−} | green | (d^{5})_{2} | | square antiprism | Os–Os = 2.182 Å Os–Cl = 2.32 Å (Bu_{4}N^{+})_{2} salt |
| [Os_{2}Cl_{10}]^{2−} | green | (d^{4})_{2} | | octahedral | Os–Cl(terminal) = 2.30 Å Os–Cl(bridging) = 2.42 Å (Et_{4}N^{+})_{2} salt |
| [IrCl_{6}]^{3−} | red | (t_{2g})^{6} | | octahedral | Ir–Cl = 2.36 Å |
| [IrCl_{6}]^{2−} | brown | (t_{2g})^{5} | | octahedral | Ir–Cl = 2.33 Å |
| [Ir_{2}Cl_{9}]^{3−} | - | ((t_{2g})^{6})_{2} | | bioctahedral | |
| [PtCl_{4}]^{2−} | pink | d^{8} | | square planar | |
| [PtCl_{6}]^{2−} | yellow | d^{6} | | octahedral | Pt–Cl distance = 2.32 Å Et_{4}N^{+} salt, ((Me_{4}N^{+})_{2} salt) |
| [Pt_{2}Cl_{9}]^{−} | red (Bu_{4}N^{+} salt) | ((t_{2g})^{6})_{2} | | octahedral | Pt–Cl_{t} and Pt–Cl_{bridge} = 2.25, 2.38 Å |
| [Pt_{2}Cl_{10}]^{2−} | yellow-brown (PPN^{+} salt) | ((t_{2g})^{6})_{2} | | edge-shared bioctahedral | Pt–Cl_{t} and Pt–Cl_{bridge} = 2.27, 2.37 Å |
| [Pt_{6}Cl_{12}] | yellow-brown | (d^{8})_{6} | | square planar | Pt–Cl = 2.31 |
| [AuCl_{2}]^{−} | white/colorless | d^{10} | | linear | Au–Cl distances of 2.28 Å NEt^{+}_{4} salt |
| Au_{4}Cl_{8} | black | (d^{10})_{2}(d^{8})_{2} | | linear and square planar | rare example of mixed valence, molecular chloride |
| [AuCl_{4}]^{−} | yellow | d^{8} | | square planar | Au–Cl distances of 2.26 Å NBu^{+}_{4} salt |
| [HgCl_{4}]^{2−} | white/colorless | d^{10} | | tetrahedral | Hg–Cl distance is 2.46 Å Et_{4}N^{+} salt |
| [Hg_{2}Cl_{6}]^{2−} | white/colorless | d^{10} | | edge-shared bitetrahedral | Hg–Cl distance is 2.46 Å Bu_{4}N^{+} salt |

== Heteroleptic complexes ==
Heteroleptic complexes containing chloride are numerous. Most hydrated metal halides are members of this class. Hexamminecobalt(III) chloride and Cisplatin (cis-Pt(NH_{3})_{2}Cl_{2}) are prominent examples of metal-ammine-chlorides.

=== Hydrates ===
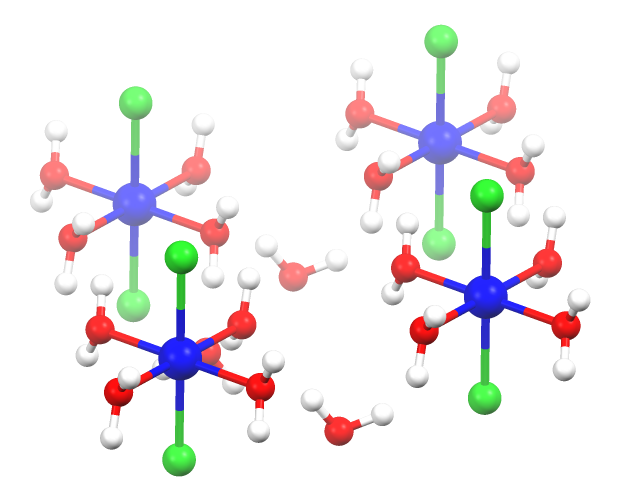
"Nickel dichloride hexahydrate" consists of the chloride complex trans-[NiCl_{2}(H_{2}O)_{4} plus water of crystallization.

As indicated in the table below, many hydrates of metal chlorides are molecular complexes. These compounds are often important commercial sources of transition metal chlorides. Several hydrated metal chlorides are not molecular and thus are not included in this tabulation. For example the dihydrates of manganese(II) chloride, nickel(II) chloride, copper(II) chloride, iron(II) chloride, and cobalt(II) chloride are coordination polymers.

| Formula of hydrated metal halides | Coordination sphere of the metal |
|---|---|
| TiCl_{3}(H_{2}O)_{6} | trans-[TiCl_{2}(H_{2}O)_{4}]^{+} |
| VCl_{3}(H_{2}O)_{6} | trans-[VCl_{2}(H_{2}O)_{4}]^{+} |
| CrCl_{3}(H_{2}O)_{6} | trans-[CrCl_{2}(H_{2}O)_{4}]^{+} |
| CrCl_{3}(H_{2}O)_{6} | [CrCl(H_{2}O)_{5}]^{2+} |
| CrCl_{2}(H_{2}O)_{4} | trans-[CrCl_{2}(H_{2}O)_{4}] |
| CrCl_{3}(H_{2}O)_{6} | [Cr(H_{2}O)_{6}]^{3+} |
| MnCl_{2}(H_{2}O)_{6} | trans-[MnCl_{2}(H_{2}O)_{4}] |
| MnCl_{2}(H_{2}O)_{4} | cis-[MnCl_{2}(H_{2}O)_{4}] |
| FeCl_{2}(H_{2}O)_{6} | trans-[FeCl_{2}(H_{2}O)_{4}] |
| FeCl_{2}(H_{2}O)_{4} | trans-[FeCl_{2}(H_{2}O)_{4}] |
| FeCl_{3}(H_{2}O)_{6} | one of four hydrates of ferric chloride, |
| FeCl_{3}(H_{2}O)_{2.5} | cis-[FeCl_{2}(H_{2}O)_{4}]^{+} |
| CoCl_{2}(H_{2}O)_{6} | trans-[CoCl_{2}(H_{2}O)_{4}] |
| CoCl_{2}(H_{2}O)_{4} | cis-[CoCl_{2}(H_{2}O)_{4}] |
| NiCl_{2}(H_{2}O)_{6} | trans-[NiCl_{2}(H_{2}O)_{4}] |
| NiCl_{2}(H_{2}O)_{4} | cis-[NiCl_{2}(H_{2}O)_{4}] |

=== Adducts ===
Metal chlorides form adducts with ethers to give transition metal ether complexes.
