= Molybdenum(II) iodide =

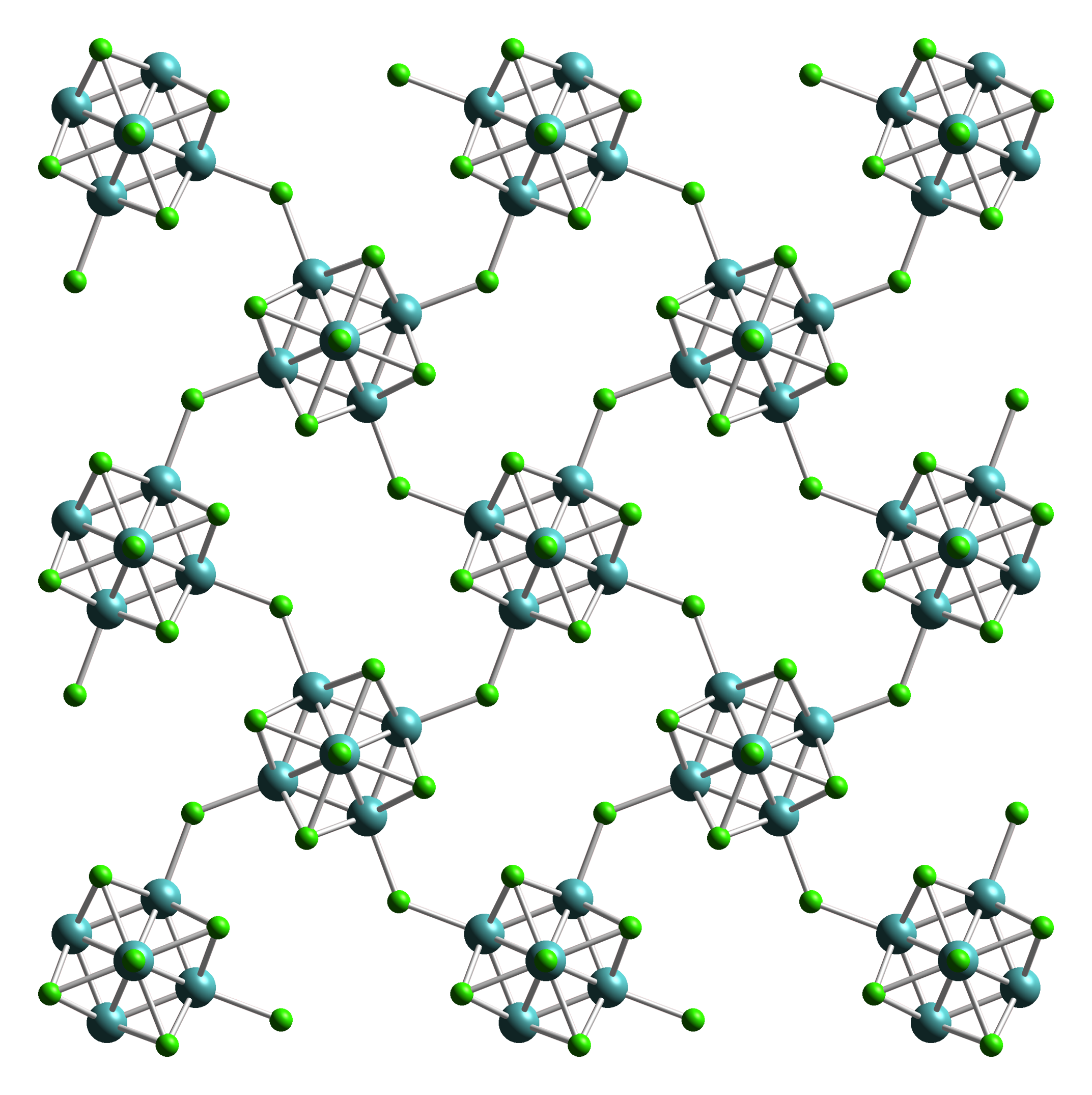

Identifiers
CAS Number	14055-74-4
3D model (JSmol)	Interactive image
ChemSpider	4937357
ECHA InfoCard	100.219.927
EC Number	692-029-6
PubChem CID	6432098
CompTox Dashboard (EPA)	DTXSID30276392
- InChI: InChI=1S/2HI.Mo/h2*1H;/q;;+2/p-2 Key: NPQZRYZJQWFZNG-UHFFFAOYSA-L
- SMILES: [I-].[I-].[Mo+2]

Properties
Chemical formula	I_{2}Mo
Molar mass	349.76 g·mol^{−1}
Appearance	black solid
Density	5.278 g·cm^{−3}
Melting point	730 °C (1,350 °F; 1,000 K)

Related compounds
Other anions	molybdenum(II) chloride molybdenum(II) bromide
Other cations	chromium(II) iodide tungsten(II) iodide
Related compounds	molybdenum(III) iodide
- Except where otherwise noted, data are given for materials in their standard state (at 25 °C [77 °F], 100 kPa). Infobox references

Molybdenum(II) iodide is an iodide of molybdenum with the chemical formula MoI_{2}.

== Preparation ==
Molybdenum(II) iodide can be produced by the reaction of molybdenum(II) bromide and lithium iodide:

[Mo_{6}Br_{8}]Br_{4} + 12 LiI → [Mo_{6}I_{8}]I_{4} + 12 LiBr

It can also be produced by the decomposition of molybdenum(III) iodide in a vacuum at 100 °C:

6 MoI_{3} → [Mo_{6}I_{8}]I_{4} + 3 I_{2}

== Properties ==
Molybdenum(II) iodide is a black solid that is stable in air. It is insoluble in polar and non-polar solvents.
