= Molybdenum(III) bromide =

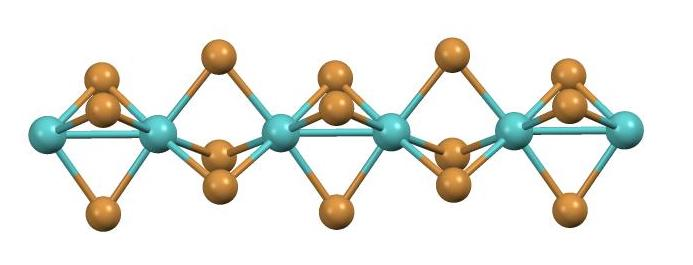

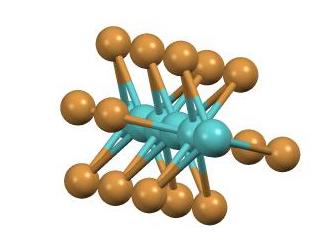

Names
- IUPAC name Molybdenum(III) bromide
- Other names Molybdenum tribromide

Identifiers
CAS Number	13446-57-6
3D model (JSmol)	Interactive image
ChemSpider	75310
ECHA InfoCard	100.033.259
EC Number	236-600-6
PubChem CID	83472
CompTox Dashboard (EPA)	DTXSID2065462
- InChI: InChI=1S/3BrH.Mo/h3*1H;/q;;;+3/p-3 Key: YPFBRNLUIFQCQL-UHFFFAOYSA-K; InChI=1/3BrH.Mo/h3*1H;/q;;;+3/p-3 Key: YPFBRNLUIFQCQL-DFZHHIFOAV
- SMILES: Br[Mo](Br)Br

Properties
Chemical formula	MoBr_{3}
Molar mass	335.70 g/mol
Appearance	dark green to black solid
Density	4.89 g/cm^{3}
Melting point	500 °C (932 °F; 773 K) (decomposes)
Solubility in water	insoluble
Solubility	soluble in pyridine
Magnetic susceptibility (χ)	+525.0·10^{−6} cm^{3}/mol

Related compounds
Other anions	Molybdenum(III) chloride Molybdenum(III) iodide
Related compounds	Molybdenum(II) bromide
- Except where otherwise noted, data are given for materials in their standard state (at 25 °C [77 °F], 100 kPa). verify (what is ?) Infobox references

Molybdenum(III) bromide is the inorganic compound with the formula MoBr_{3}. It is a black solid that is insoluble in most solvents but dissolves in donor solvents such as pyridine.

== Preparation ==
Molybdenum(III) bromide is produced by the reaction of elemental molybdenum and bromine at 350 °C (662 °F).

$$\mathrm{2 \ Mo + 3 \ Br_2 \longrightarrow 2 \ MoBr_3}$$

It can also be prepared from the reduction of molybdenum(IV) bromide with molybdenum metal, hydrogen gas, or a hydrocarbon.

It has a structure consisting of infinite chains of face-sharing octahedra with alternatingly short and long Mo-Mo contacts. The same structure is adopted by the tribromides of ruthenium and technetium. In contrast, in the high temperature phase of titanium(III) iodide, the Ti---Ti separation is invariant.
