= Tungsten(III) iodide =

Names
- Other names Tungsten triiodide

Identifiers
CAS Number	15513-69-6
3D model (JSmol)	Interactive image
ChemSpider	65321903
PubChem CID	12010987
CompTox Dashboard (EPA)	DTXSID101336910
- InChI: InChI=1S/3HI.W/h3*1H;/q;;;+3/p-3 Key: BHPNVJNBEDSWEE-UHFFFAOYSA-K
- SMILES: I[W](I)I

Properties
Chemical formula	WI_{3}
Molar mass	564.6
Appearance	Black solid
Solubility in water	Insoluble

Related compounds
Other anions	Tungsten(III) bromide Tungsten(III) chloride
Other cations	Chromium(III) iodide Molybdenum(III) iodide
- Except where otherwise noted, data are given for materials in their standard state (at 25 °C [77 °F], 100 kPa). Infobox references

Tungsten(III) iodide or tungsten triiodide is a chemical compound of tungsten and iodine with the formula WI_{3}.

== Preparation ==
Tungsten(III) iodide can be prepared by reducing tungsten hexacarbonyl with iodine.

$$\mathrm{2 \ W(CO)_6 + 3 \ I_2 \longrightarrow 2 \ WI_3 + 12 \ CO}$$

== Properties ==
Tungsten(III) iodide is a black solid that releases iodine at room temperature, and is less stable than molybdenum(III) iodide. It is soluble in acetone and nitrobenzene, and slightly soluble in chloroform.

It decomposes to form tungsten(II) iodide:

$$\mathrm{ 6 WI_3 \longrightarrow [W_6I_8]I_4+3 I_2}$$
