= Transition metal ether complex =

Structure of the ether complex HfCl_{4}(thf)_{2}fwn

In chemistry, a transition metal ether complex is a coordination complex consisting of a transition metal bonded to one or more ether ligand. The inventory of complexes is extensive. Common ether ligands are diethyl ether and tetrahydrofuran. Common chelating ether ligands include the glymes, dimethoxyethane (dme) and diglyme, and the crown ethers. Being lipophilic, metal-ether complexes often exhibit solubility in organic solvents, a property of interest in synthetic chemistry. In contrast, the diether 1,4-dioxane is generally a bridging ligand.

== Bonding, structure, reactions ==
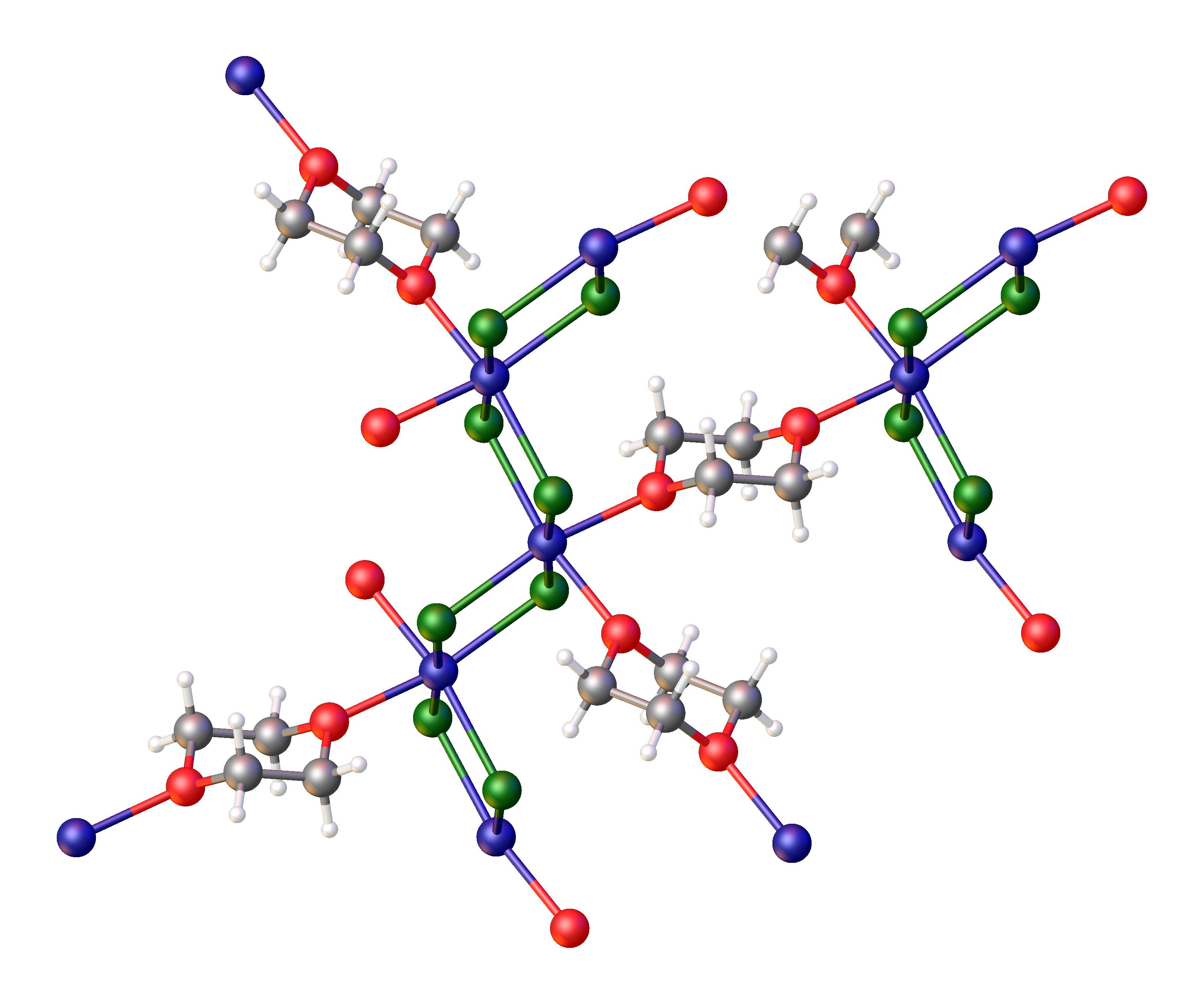
In almost all of its complexes, dioxane is a bridging, not chelating, ligand. Structure of the coordination polymer of cobalt(II) chloride and 1,4-dioxane.

Ethers are L-type ligands. They are σ-donors that exert weak field ligands. They resemble water ligands as seen in aquo complexes. They do not, however, readily participate in hydrogen bonding. The ether oxygen is nearly trigonal planar in its complexes.

Being weakly basic, ether ligands tend to be easily displaceable. Otherwise, ether ligands are relatively unreactive. Cyclic ethers such as thf can ring-open or even deoxygenated when bound to highly electrophilic metal halides. Thus treatment of tungsten hexachloride with one equivalent of thf gives 1,4-dichlorobutane:

WCl_{6} + OC_{4}H_{8} → WOCl_{4} + ClCH_{2}CH_{2}CH_{2}CH_{2}Cl

At higher concentrations of thf, polytetrahydrofuran is produced.

== Examples ==
=== Homoleptic complexes ===
Ethers are relatively bulky ligands, thus homoleptic (all ligands being the same) ether complexes are uncommon. Examples often feature weakly coordinating anions such as B(Ar^{F})^{−}_{4} and Al(OR^{F})^{−}_{4}.

- [V(thf)_{6}](BAr^{F}_{4})_{2}
- [Mn(thf)_{6}](Mn(CO)_{5}]_{2}
- [Fe(thf)_{6}][BAr^{F}_{4}]_{2}
- [Ni(thf)_{6}][Al(OR^{F})_{4}]_{2}

=== Metal halide complexes ===
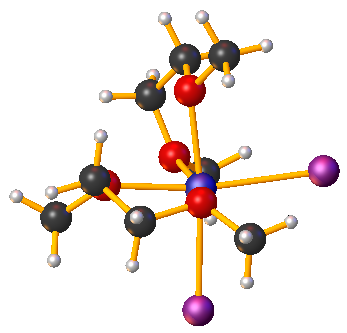
Structure of NiI_{2}(dme)_{2} as determined by X-ray crystallography. The sum of the angles at O is 352°, indicating a nearly planar ether oxygen. Color code: O = red, I = purple, Ni = blue, C = black.

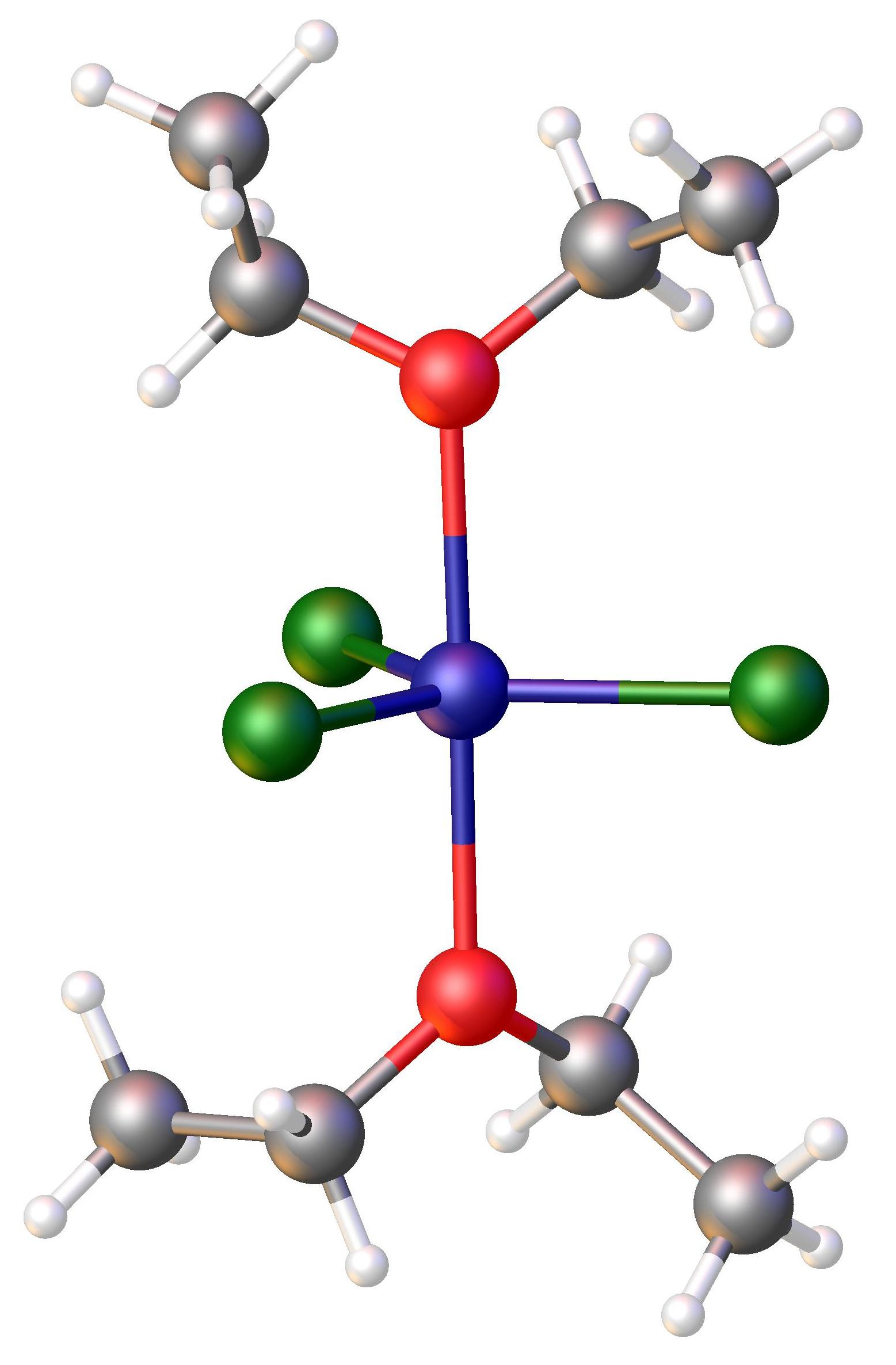
Structure of FeCl_{3}(diethylether)_{2}. Color code: Cl=green, Fe = blue, O = red.

Metal chloride-tetrahydrofuran complexes are especially studied. These compounds are reagents because they are "organic-soluble" source of anhydrous halides. The following trends are observed: for diethyl ether forms isolable complexes with only highly electrophilic halides, thf forms more extensive set of complexes with a more extensive set of metal chlorides. Heavier, late metal halides (RuCl_{3} to CdCl_{2} and OsCl_{4} to HgCl_{2}) do not form isolable complexes with simple ethers.

Formula of M–Cl–ether complexes	Coordination sphere	color and comment
ScCl_{3}(thf)_{3}	mer-ScO_{3}Cl_{3}	colorless
TiCl_{4}(Et_{2}O)_{2}	cis-TiO_{2}Cl_{4}	yellow
TiCl_{4}(thf)_{2}	cis and trans-TiO_{2}Cl_{4}	yellow Both cis and trans isomers have been reported
TiCl_{3}(thf)_{3}	mer-TiO_{3}Cl_{3}	blue
[TiCl_{3}(thf)_{2}]_{2}	TiO_{2}Cl_{4}	green
ZrCl_{4}(Et_{2}O)_{2}	trans-ZrO_{2}Cl_{4}	white
ZrCl_{4}(thf)_{2}	cis-ZrO_{2}Cl_{4}	white
HfCl_{4}(thf)_{2}	cis-HfO_{2}Cl_{4}	white
VCl_{3}(thf)_{3}	mer-VO_{3}Cl_{3}	pink
[VCl_{3}(thf)_{2}]_{2}	trans-VO_{2}Cl_{4}	red
NbCl_{4}(Et_{2}O)_{2}	trans-NbO_{2}Cl_{4}	yellow
NbCl_{4}(thf)_{2}	trans-NbO_{2}Cl_{4}	yellow
Ta_{3}Cl_{9}(thf)_{4}	TaO_{2}Cl_{4} and TaOCl_{5}	green
CrCl_{3}(thf)_{3}	mer-CrO_{3}Cl_{3}	pink
MoCl_{4}(thf)_{2}	trans-MoO_{2}Cl_{4}	pink
MoCl_{4}(Et_{2}O)_{2}	trans-MoO_{2}Cl_{4}	beige
MoCl_{3}(thf)_{3}	mer-MoO_{3}Cl_{3}	red
WCl_{3}(thf)_{3}	mer-WO_{3}Cl_{3}	yellow
WCl_{4}(Et_{2}O)_{2}	trans-WO_{2}Cl_{4}	yellow
MnCl_{3}(thf)_{3}	mer-MnO_{3}Cl_{3}	brown-purple
TcCl_{4}(thf)_{2}	cis-TcO_{2}Cl_{4}	yellow
ReCl_{4}(thf)_{2}	cis-ReO_{2}Cl_{4}	green See also: ReCl_{4}(dme)
Fe_{4}Cl_{8}(thf)_{6}	FeO_{2}Cl_{3}, FeO_{2}Cl_{4}	brown
FeCl_{3}(thf)_{2}	FeO_{2}Cl_{3}	the related diethyl ether complex is brown
FeCl_{3}(OEt_{2})_{2}	FeO_{2}Cl_{3}	brown
Co_{4}Cl_{8}(thf)_{6}	CoO_{2}Cl_{3}, CoO_{2}Cl_{4}	blue isostructural with Fe analogue
[CoCl_{2}(dme)]_{2}	CoO_{2}Cl_{3}	pink
NiCl_{2}(dimethoxyethane)_{2}	cis-NiCl_{2}O_{4}	yellow
[Cu_{2}Cl_{4}(thf)_{3}]_{n}	CuO_{2}Cl_{4}, CuOCl_{4}	orange
ZnCl_{2}(thf)_{2}	ZnO_{2}Cl_{2}	white

=== Metal carbonyl complexes ===
- M(CO)_{5}(thf) (M = Cr, Mo, W)
- Mo(CO)_{3}(diglyme)

== Related topics ==
Ethers are widely used as ligands beyond transition metal chemistry. Few alkali metal halides form isolable adducts, but the divalent alkaline earth complexes are well known, such as BeCl_{2}(OEt_{2})_{2}.
