= Molybdenum(III) chloride =

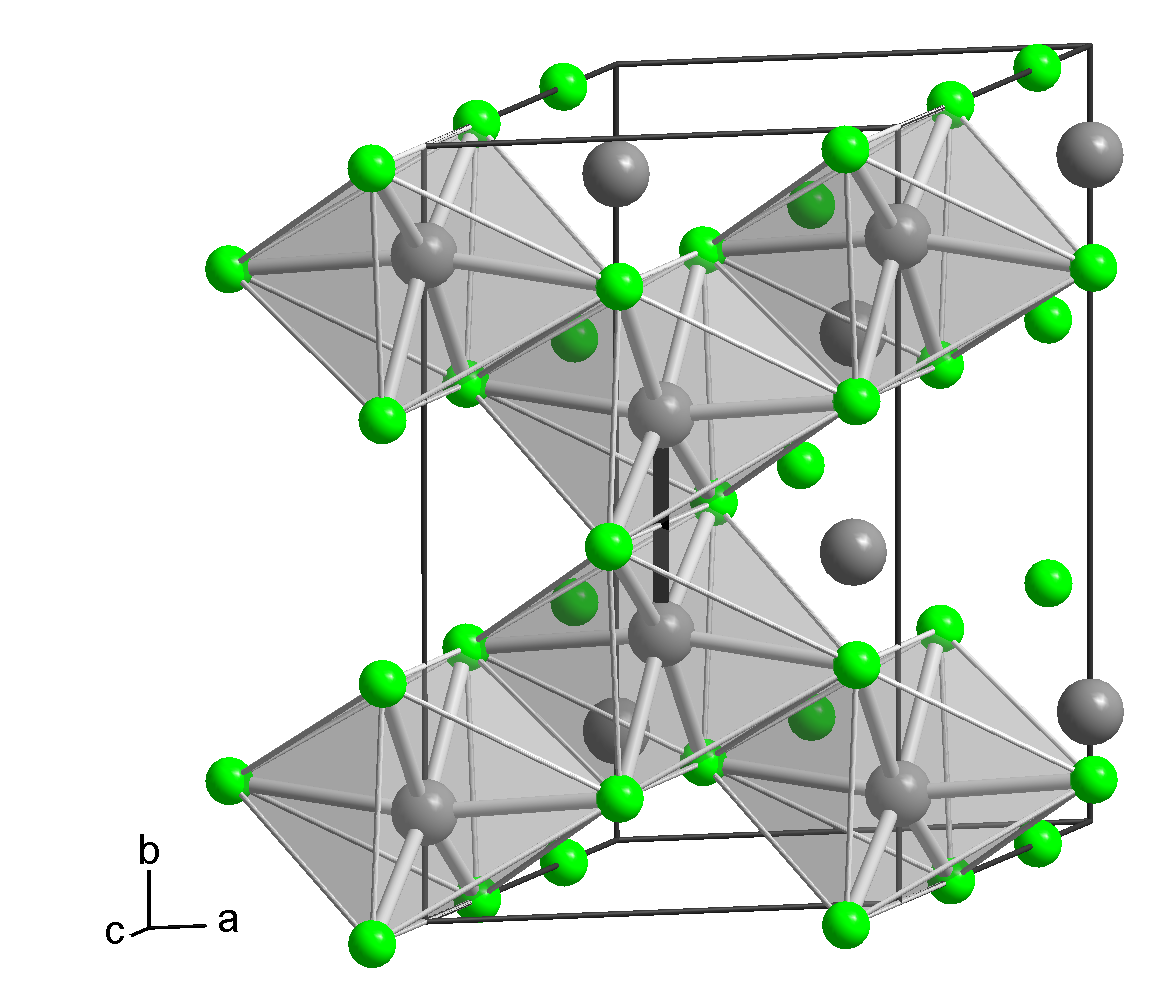
Molybdenum(III) chloride alpha polymorph
α-MoCl_{3}
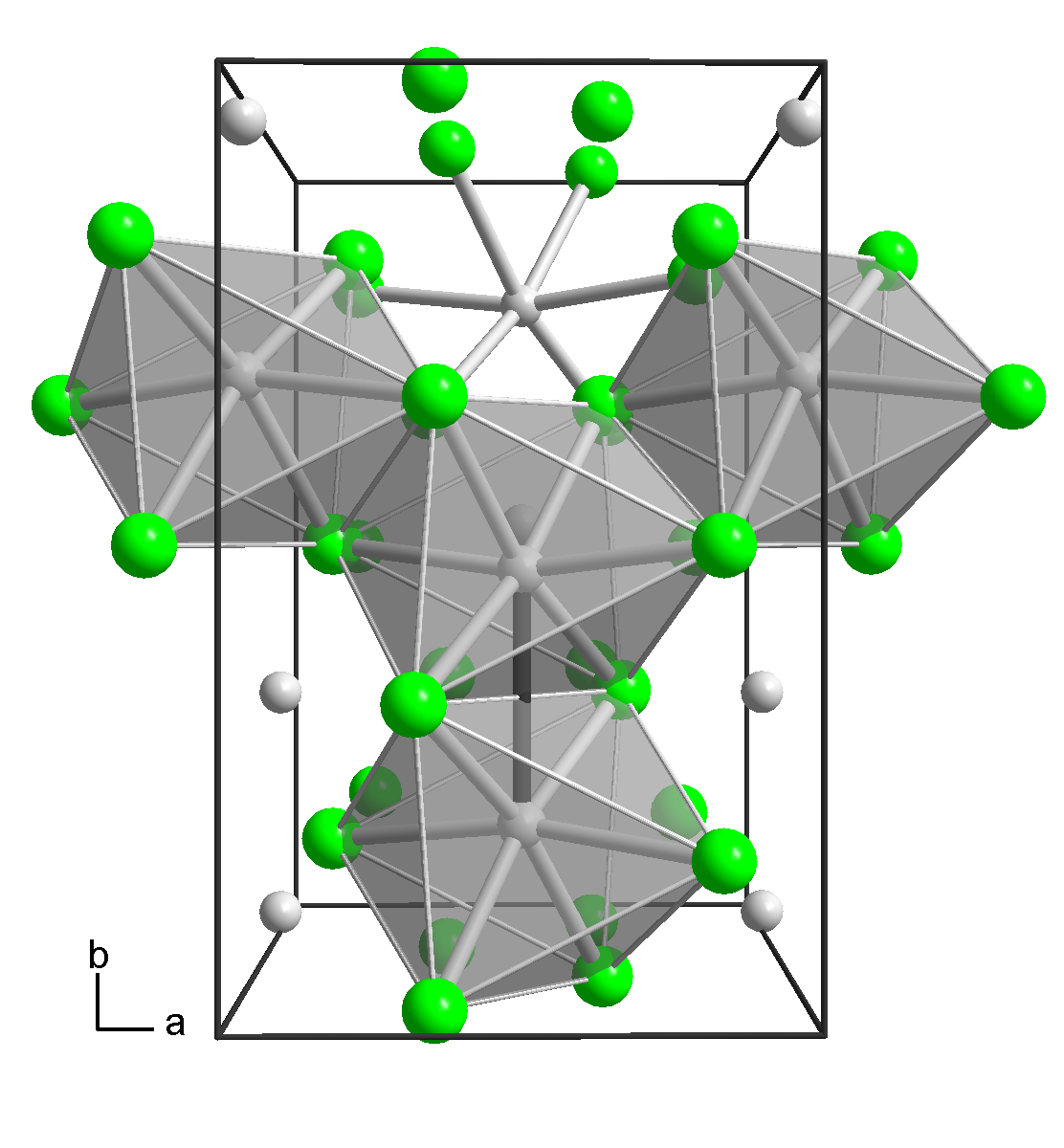
Molybdenum(III) chloride beta polymorph
β-MoCl_{3}

Names
- IUPAC names Molybdenum(III) chloride Molybdenum trichloride

Identifiers
CAS Number	13478-18-7
3D model (JSmol)	Interactive image
ChemSpider	75350
ECHA InfoCard	100.033.418
EC Number	236-775-9
PubChem CID	83515
UNII	9D9PY7688B
CompTox Dashboard (EPA)	DTXSID6065503
- InChI: InChI=1S/3ClH.Mo/h3*1H;/q;;;+3/p-3 Key: ZSSVQAGPXAAOPV-UHFFFAOYSA-K; InChI=1/3ClH.Mo/h3*1H;/q;;;+3/p-3 Key: ZSSVQAGPXAAOPV-DFZHHIFOAN
- SMILES: Cl[Mo](Cl)Cl

Properties
Chemical formula	MoCl_{3}
Molar mass	202.30 g/mol
Appearance	dark red solid paramagnetic
Density	3.58 g/cm^{3}
Melting point	410 °C (770 °F; 683 K) (decomposes)
Solubility in water	insoluble
Solubility	insoluble in ethanol, diethyl ether
Magnetic susceptibility (χ)	+43.0·10^{−6} cm^{3}/mol

Hazards
Flash point	Non-flammable

Related compounds
Other anions	Molybdenum(III) fluoride Molybdenum(III) bromide Molybdenum(III) iodide
Other cations	Chromium(IV) chloride Tungsten(V) chloride
Related molybdenum chlorides	Molybdenum(II) chloride Molybdenum(IV) chloride Molybdenum(V) chloride Molybdenum(VI) chloride
- Except where otherwise noted, data are given for materials in their standard state (at 25 °C [77 °F], 100 kPa). verify (what is ?) Infobox references

Molybdenum(III) chloride is the inorganic compound with the formula MoCl_{3}. It forms purple crystals.

== Synthesis and structure ==
Molybdenum(III) chloride is synthesized by the reduction of molybdenum(V) chloride with hydrogen. A higher yield is produced by the reduction of pure molybdenum(V) chloride with anhydrous tin(II) chloride as the reducing agent.

Molybdenum trichloride exists as two polymorphs: alpha (α) and beta (β). The alpha structure is similar to that of aluminum chloride (AlCl_{3}). In this structure, molybdenum has octahedral coordination geometry and exhibits cubic close-packing in its crystalline structure. The beta structure, however, exhibits hexagonal close packing.

== Ether complexes ==
Molybdenum trichloride gives a ether complexes MoCl_{3}(thf)_{3} and MoCl_{3}(Et_{2}O)_{3}. They are beige, paramagnetic solids. Both feature octahedral Mo centers. The diethyl ether complex is synthesized by reducing a Et_{2}O solution of MoCl_{5} with tin powder. Older procedures involve stepwise reduction involving isolation of the Mo(IV)-thf complex.

Hexa(tert-butoxy)dimolybdenum(III) is prepared by the salt metathesis reaction from MoCl_{3}(thf)_{3}:

2 MoCl_{3}(thf)_{3} + 6 LiOBu-t → Mo_{2}(OBu-t)_{6} + 6 LiCl + 6 thf
