= Molybdenum hexafluoride =

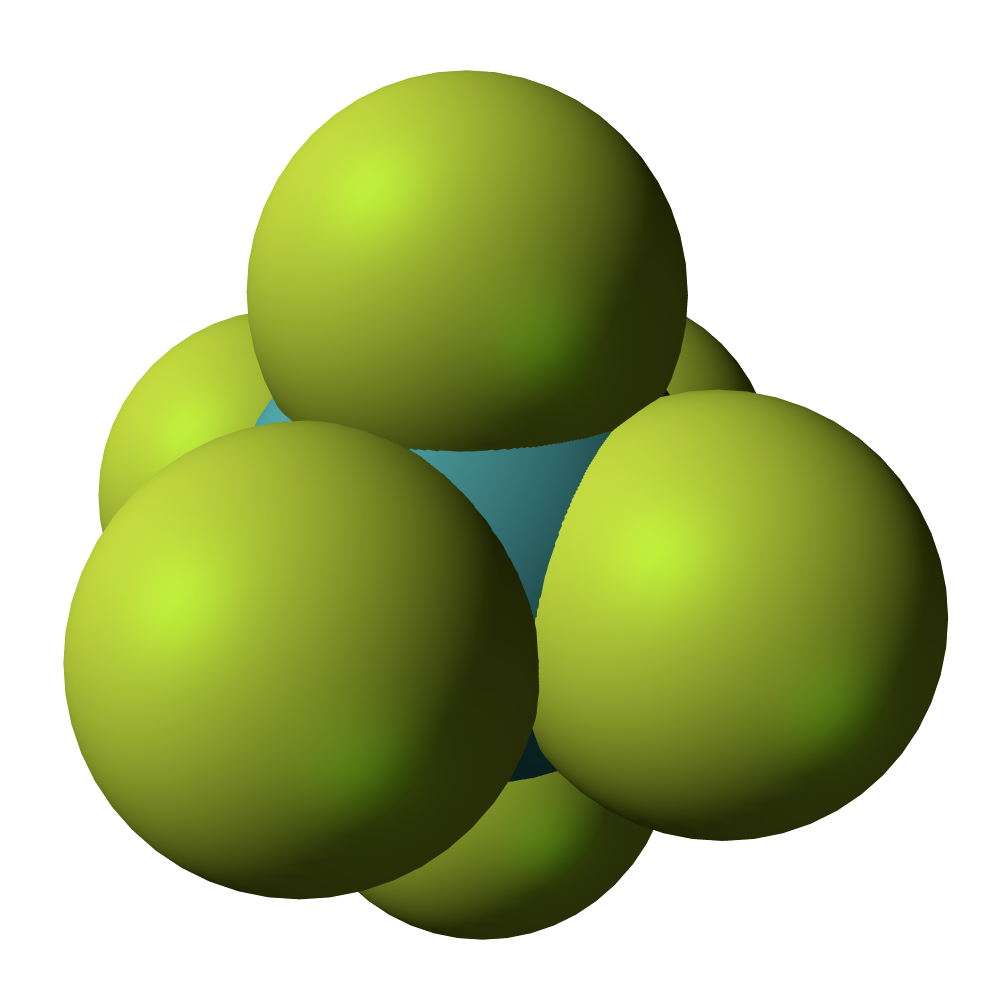

Names
- IUPAC names molybdenum(VI) fluoride
- Other names molybdenum hexafluoride

Identifiers
CAS Number	7783-77-9
3D model (JSmol)	Interactive image
ChemSpider	74199
ECHA InfoCard	100.029.114
EC Number	232-026-5
PubChem CID	82219
UNII	ZLT5J123W3
CompTox Dashboard (EPA)	DTXSID0064834
- InChI: InChI=1S/6FH.Mo/h6*1H;/q;;;;;;+6/p-6
- SMILES: F[Mo](F)(F)(F)(F)F

Properties
Chemical formula	MoF_{6}
Molar mass	209.94 g·mol^{−1}
Appearance	white crystals or colorless liquid hygroscopic
Density	3.50 g/cm^{3}
Melting point	17.5 °C (63.5 °F; 290.6 K)
Boiling point	34.0 °C (93.2 °F; 307.1 K)
Solubility in water	hydrolyzes
Magnetic susceptibility (χ)	−26.0·10^{−6} cm^{3}/mol

Structure
Crystal structure	Orthorhombic, oP28
Space group	Pnma, No. 62
Coordination geometry	octahedral (O_{h})
Dipole moment	0

Related compounds
Other cations	Chromium hexafluoride; Tungsten hexafluoride; Uranium hexafluoride; Molybdenum(VI) chloride; Molybdenum(V) fluoride; Molybdenum(IV) fluoride
- Except where otherwise noted, data are given for materials in their standard state (at 25 °C [77 °F], 100 kPa). verify (what is ?) Infobox references

Molybdenum hexafluoride, also molybdenum(VI) fluoride, is an inorganic compound with the formula MoF_{6}. It is the fluoride of molybdenum in its highest oxidation state of +6. It is a colourless solid that melts just below room temperature and boils at 34 °C. It is one of the seventeen known binary hexafluorides.

== Synthesis ==
Molybdenum hexafluoride is made by direct reaction of molybdenum metal in an excess of elemental fluorine:

Mo + 3 F_{2} → MoF_{6}

The compound hydrolyzes easily, and typical impurities are MoO_{2}F_{2} and MoOF_{4}.

== Description ==
At −140 °C, it crystallizes in the orthorhombic space group Pnma. Lattice parameters are a = 9.394 Å, b = 8.543 Å, and c = 4.959 Å. There are four formula units (in this case, discrete molecules) per unit cell, giving a density of 3.50 g·cm^{−3}. The fluorine atoms are arranged in the hexagonal close packing.

In liquid and gas phase, MoF_{6} adopt octahedral molecular geometry with point group O_{h}. The Mo–F bond length is 1.817 Å.

== Applications ==
Molybdenum hexafluoride has few uses. In the nuclear industry, MoF_{6} occurs as an impurity in uranium hexafluoride since molybdenum is a fission product of uranium.

The semiconductor industry constructs various integrated circuits through chemical vapor deposition of molybdenum hexafluoride. In some cases, the deposited molybdenum is an impurity in the intended tungsten hexafluoride. MoF_{6} can be removed by reduction of a WF_{6}-MoF_{6} mixture with any of a number of elements including hydrogen iodide at moderately elevated temperature.
