= Tungsten(II) iodide =

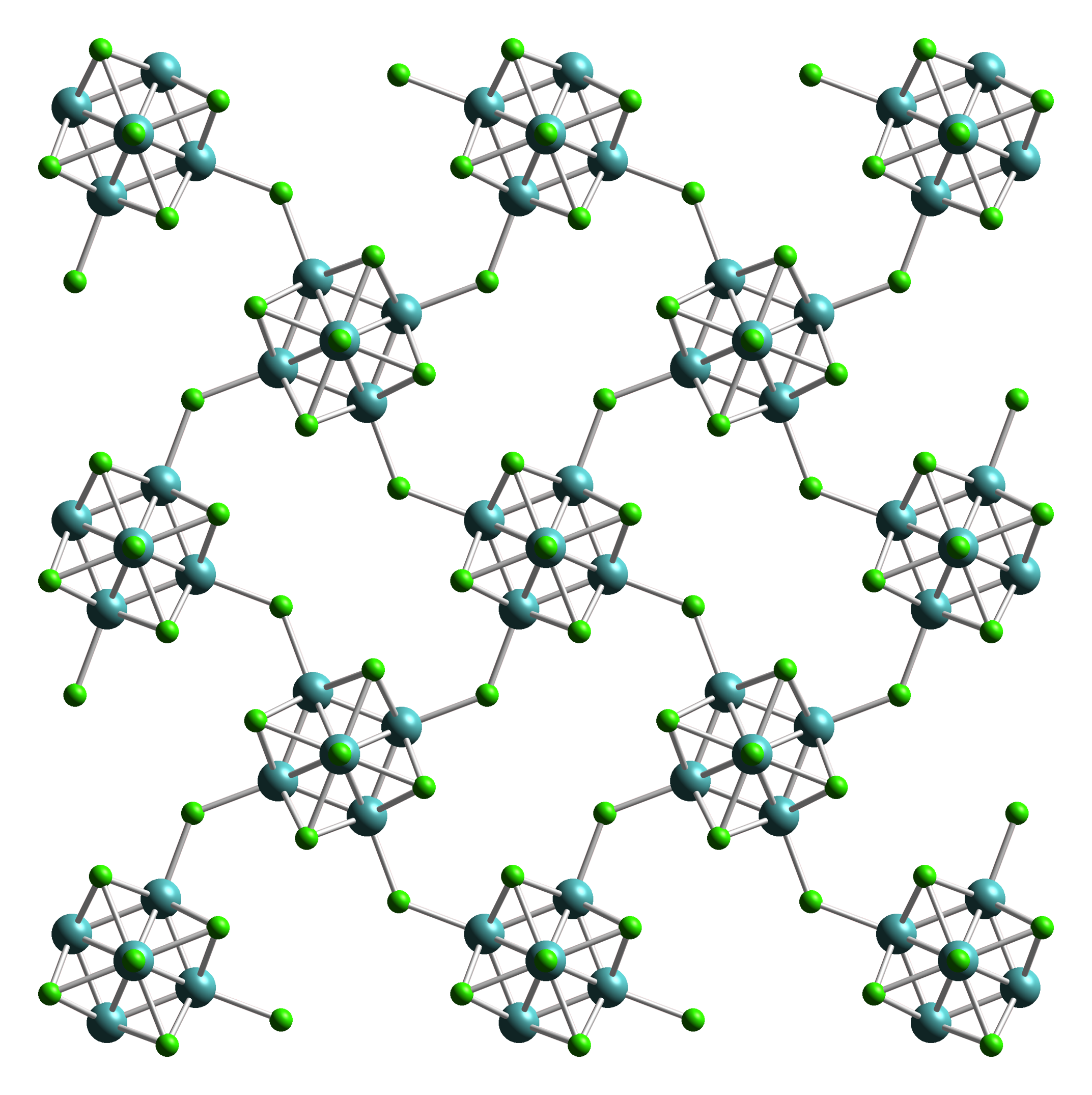

Identifiers
CAS Number	13470-17-2
3D model (JSmol)	Interactive image
ChemSpider	464830
PubChem CID	533504
- InChI: InChI=1S/2HI.W/h2*1H;/q;;+2/p-2 Key: BMKSRUJKNOBSHP-UHFFFAOYSA-L
- SMILES: [I-].[I-].[W+2]

Properties
Chemical formula	I_{2}W
Molar mass	437.65 g·mol^{−1}
Appearance	dark brown solid
Density	6.79 g·cm^{−3}
Melting point	800 °C (decomposes)
Solubility in water	insoluble

Related compounds
Other anions	tungsten(II) chloride tungsten(II) bromide
Other cations	chromium(II) iodide molybdenum(II) iodide
Related compounds	tungsten(III) iodide
- Except where otherwise noted, data are given for materials in their standard state (at 25 °C [77 °F], 100 kPa). Infobox references

Tungsten(II) iodide is an iodide of tungsten, with the chemical formula [W_{6}I_{8}]I_{4}, or abbreviated as WI_{2}.

== Preparation ==
Tungsten diiodide can obtained from the decomposition from tungsten(III) iodide:

6 WI_{3} → [W_{6}I_{8}]I_{4} + 3 I_{2}

It can also be formed by the displacement reaction of tungsten(II) chloride and iodine:

[W_{6}Cl_{8}]Cl_{4} + 12 I → [W_{6}I_{8}]I_{4} + 12 Cl

It can also be formed by the direct reaction of tungsten and iodine, which is a reversible reaction. This reaction can be used in halogen lamps.

W + I_{2} ⇌ WI_{2}

Tungsten(II) iodide can also be obtained by reacting tungsten hexacarbonyl with iodine.

== Properties ==
Tungsten(II) iodide is a dark brown-colored solid that is stable in air and moisture. Its structure is the same as tungsten(II) chloride, crystallising orthorhombic crystal system, with space group Bbem (No. 64), and lattice parameters a = 1258 pm, b = 1259 pm, c = 1584 pm.
