= Molybdenum(V) chloride =

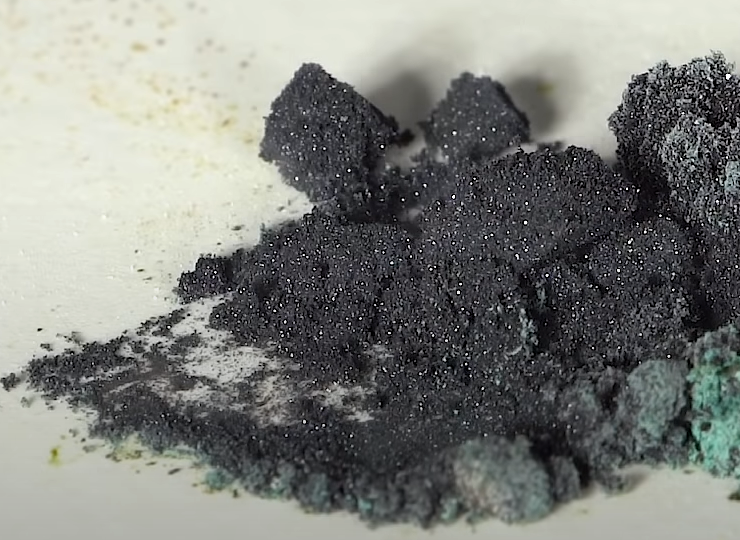
- Partially oxidized MoCl_{5}

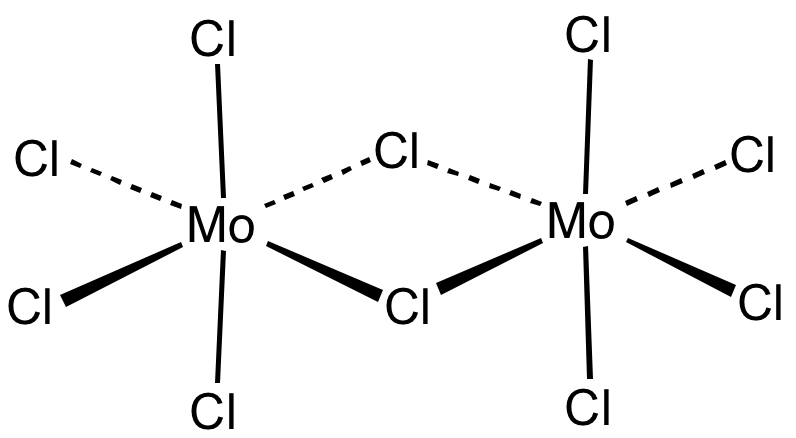
- Molybdenum(V) chloride

Names
- IUPAC names Molybdenum(V) chloride Molybdenum pentachloride

Identifiers
CAS Number	10241-05-1
3D model (JSmol)	Interactive image; Interactive image
ChEBI	CHEBI:30635
ChemSpider	55417
ECHA InfoCard	100.030.510
EC Number	233-575-3
PubChem CID	61497
RTECS number	QA4690000
UNII	BB0UFP2VO5
UN number	2508
CompTox Dashboard (EPA)	DTXSID0065012
- InChI: InChI=1S/5ClH.Mo/h5*1H;/q;;;;;+5/p-5; InChI=1S/10ClH.2Mo/h10*1H;;/q;;;;;;;;;;2*+4/p-8
- SMILES: Cl[Mo](Cl)(Cl)(Cl)Cl; Cl1[Mo](Cl)(Cl)(Cl)(Cl)Cl[Mo]1(Cl)(Cl)(Cl)Cl

Properties
Chemical formula	Mo_{2}Cl_{10}
Molar mass	273.21 g/mol (MoCl_{5})
Appearance	dark-green solid hygroscopic paramagnetic
Density	2.928 g/cm^{3}
Melting point	194 °C (381 °F; 467 K)
Boiling point	268 °C (514 °F; 541 K)
Solubility in water	hydrolyzes
Solubility	soluble in dry ether, dry alcohol, organic solvents

Structure
Crystal structure	monoclinic
Coordination geometry	edge-shared bioctahedron

Hazards
- Occupational safety and health (OHS/OSH)
Main hazards	oxidizer, hydrolyzes to release HCl
- GHS labelling
Pictograms	(GHS05: Corrosive)
Signal word	Danger
Hazard statements	H314
Precautionary statements	P260, P264, P280, P301+P330+P331, P302+P361+P354, P304+P340, P305+P354+P338, P316, P321, P363, P405, P501
Flash point	Non-flammable

Related compounds
Other anions	Molybdenum(V) fluoride; Molybdenum(IV) bromide; Molybdenum(III) iodide
Other cations	Chromium(IV) chloride; Tungsten(V) chloride
Related molybdenum chlorides	Molybdenum(II) chloride; Molybdenum(III) chloride; Molybdenum(IV) chloride; Molybdenum(VI) chloride
- Except where otherwise noted, data are given for materials in their standard state (at 25 °C [77 °F], 100 kPa). verify (what is ?) Infobox references

Molybdenum(V) chloride is the inorganic compound with the empirical formula MoCl_{5}. This dark volatile solid is used in research to prepare other molybdenum compounds. It is moisture-sensitive and soluble in chlorinated solvents.

== Structure ==
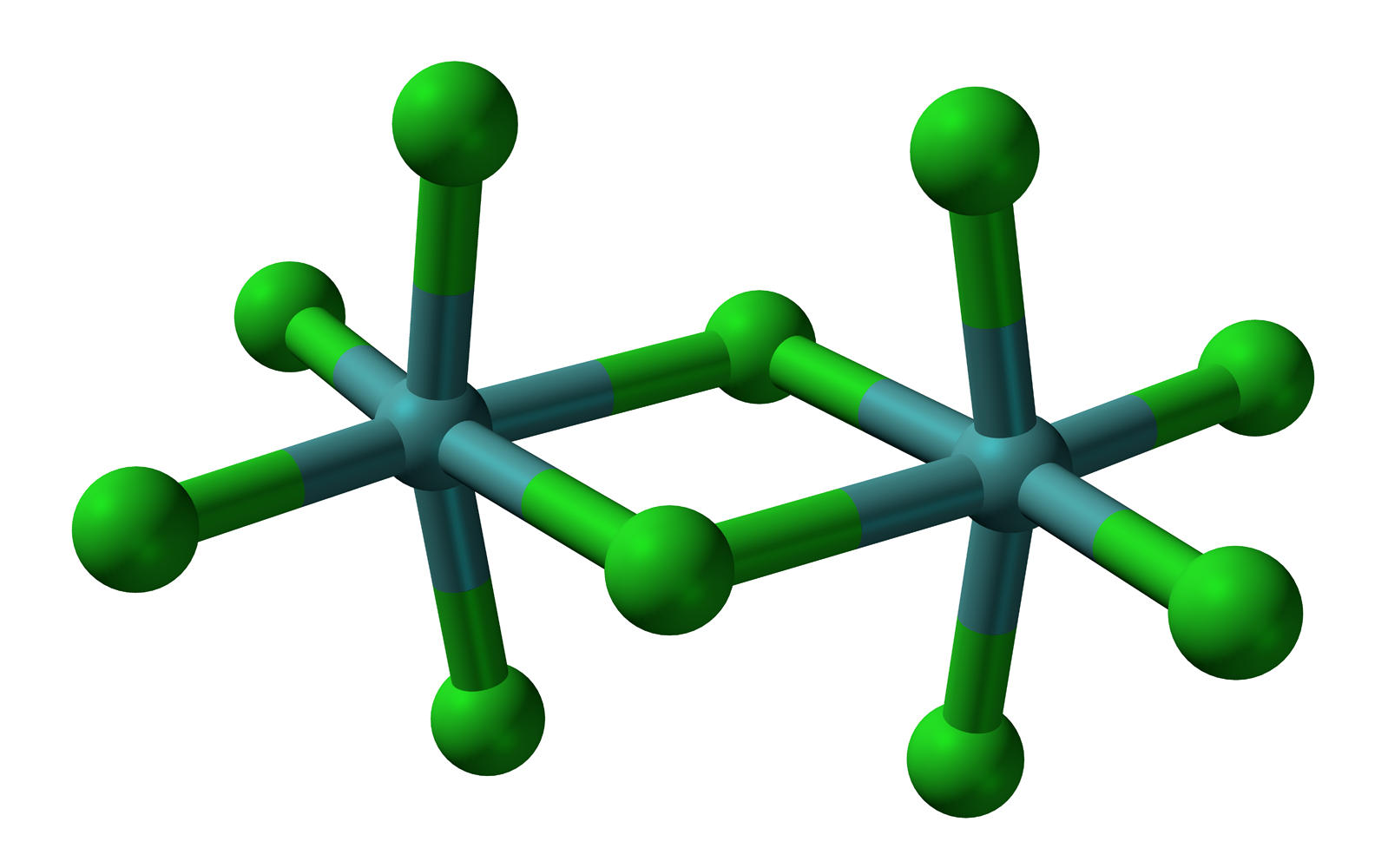
Ball-and-stick model of the dimer in the crystal structure

Usually called molybdenum pentachloride, it is in fact partly a dimer with the molecular formula Mo_{2}Cl_{10}. In the dimer, each molybdenum has local octahedral symmetry and two chlorides bridge between the molybdenum centers. A similar structure is also found for the pentachlorides of W, Nb and Ta. In the gas phase and partly in solution, the dimers partially dissociate to give a monomeric MoCl_{5}. The monomer is paramagnetic, with one unpaired electron per Mo center, reflecting the fact that the formal oxidation state is +5, leaving one valence electron on the metal center.

== Preparation and properties ==
MoCl_{5} is prepared by chlorination of Mo metal but also chlorination of MoO_{3}. The unstable hexachloride MoCl_{6} is not produced in this way.

MoCl_{5} is reduced by acetonitrile:

2 MoCl_{5} + 5 CH_{3}CN → 2 MoCl_{4}(CH_{3}CN)_{2} + HCl + ClCH_{2}CN

Molybdenum(IV) bromide is prepared by treatment of MoCl_{5} with hydrogen bromide:

2 MoCl_{5} + 10 HBr → 2 MoBr_{4} + 10 HCl + Br_{2}

The reaction proceeds via the unstable molybdenum(V) bromide, which releases bromine at room temperature.

MoCl_{5} is a good Lewis acid toward non-oxidizable ligands. It forms an adduct with chloride to form [MoCl_{6}]^{−}. In organic synthesis, the compound finds occasional use in chlorinations, deoxygenation, and oxidative coupling reactions.

Although it polymerizes tetrahydrofuran, MoCl_{5} is stable in diethyl ether. Reduction of such solutions with tin gives MoCl_{4}((CH_{3}CH_{2})_{2}O)_{2} and MoCl_{3}((CH_{3}CH_{2})_{2}O)_{3}, depending on conditions.

== Safety considerations ==
MoCl_{5} is an aggressive oxidant and readily hydrolyzes to release HCl.

== See also ==
- Molybdenum(IV) chloride
- Molybdenum(VI) chloride
- Molybdenum(V) fluoride
- Tungsten(V) chloride
