= Molybdenum tetrachloride =

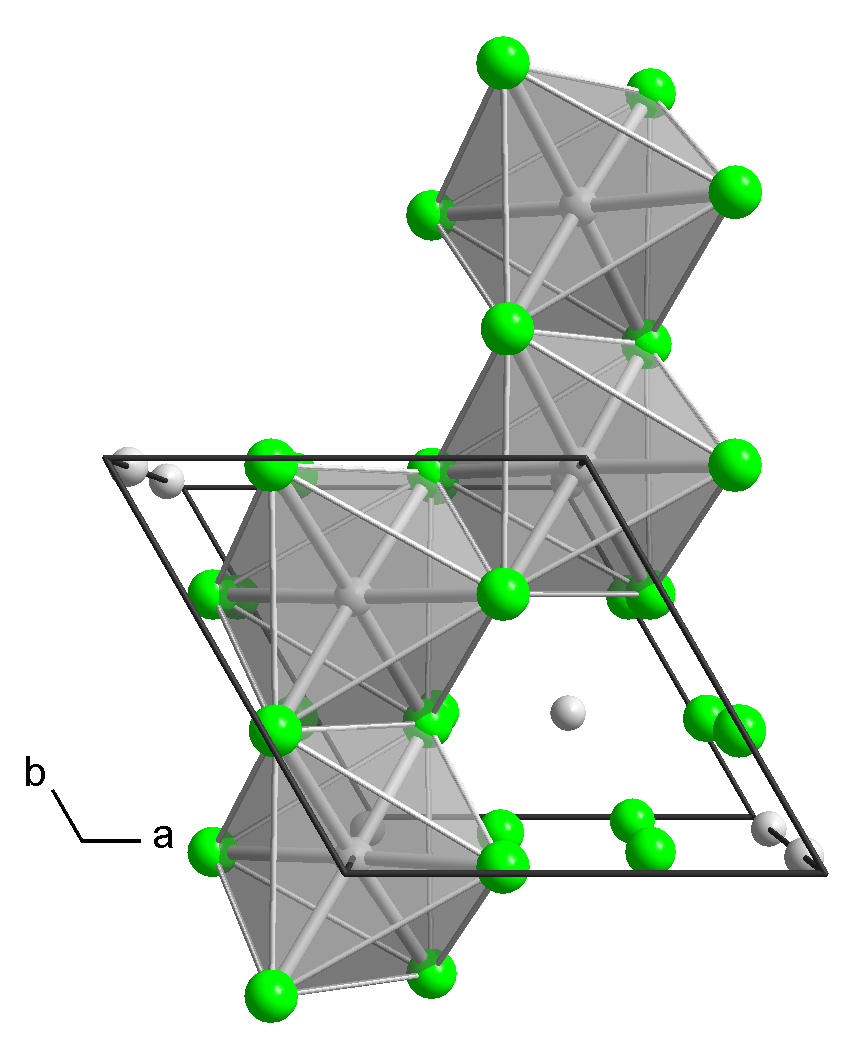
- Molybdenum tetrachloride

Names
- IUPAC name Molybdenum tetrachloride
- Other names Molybdenum(IV) chloride

Identifiers
CAS Number	13320-71-3
3D model (JSmol)	Interactive image
ChemSpider	75200
ECHA InfoCard	100.033.039
PubChem CID	83340
UNII	6417YBA168
CompTox Dashboard (EPA)	DTXSID90928002
- InChI: InChI=1S/4ClH.Mo/h4*1H;/q;;;;+4/p-4 Key: OYMJNIHGVDEDFX-UHFFFAOYSA-J; InChI=1/4ClH.Mo/h4*1H;/q;;;;+4/p-4/rCl4Mo/c1-5(2,3)4 Key: OYMJNIHGVDEDFX-DFQGPNMMAB
- SMILES: Cl[Mo](Cl)(Cl)Cl

Properties
Chemical formula	MoCl_{4}
Molar mass	237.752 g/mol
Appearance	black solid
Melting point	552 °C (1,026 °F; 825 K)
Solubility in water	Decomposes

Hazards
NFPA 704 (fire diamond)	3 0 1
Flash point	Non flammable

Related compounds
Related compounds	Molybdenum(II) chloride Molybdenum(III) chloride Molybdenum(V) chloride Molybdenum(VI) chloride
- Except where otherwise noted, data are given for materials in their standard state (at 25 °C [77 °F], 100 kPa). verify (what is ?) Infobox references

Molybdenum tetrachloride is the inorganic compound with the empirical formula MoCl_{4}. The material exists as two polymorphs, both being dark-colored paramagnetic solids. These compounds are mainly of interest as precursors to other molybdenum complexes.

== Structure ==
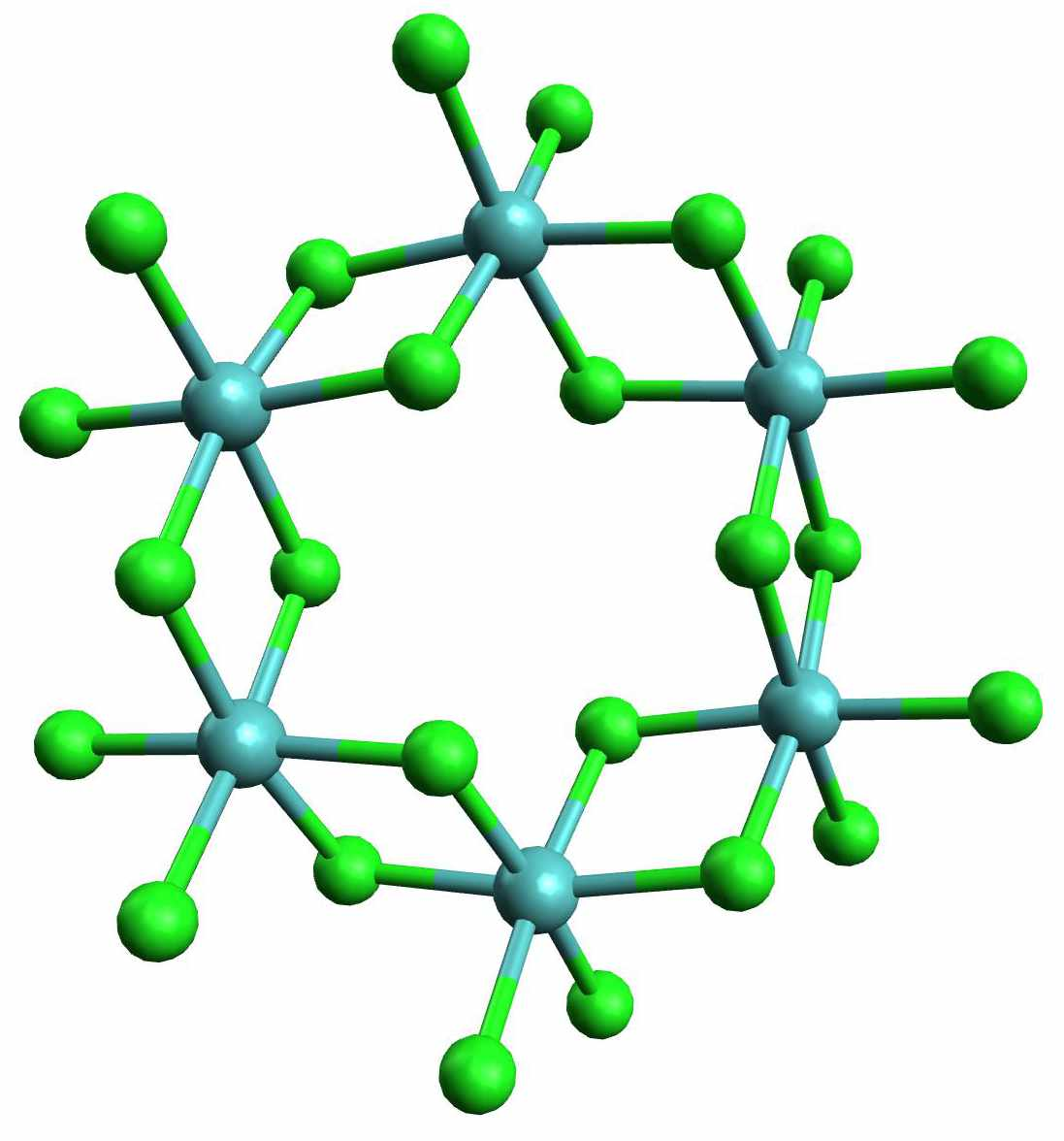
Structure of β-MoCl4

The α polymorph is a polymer. The β polymorph is a hexamer. In both polymorph, the Mo center is octahedral with two terminal chloride ligands and four doubly bridging ligands. In addition to these two binary phases, a number of adducts are known with the formula MoCl_{4}L_{2} where L is a Lewis base.

== Preparation ==
α-Molybdenum tetrachloride can be prepared from by dechlorination of molybdenum pentachloride using tetrachloroethene:

2 MoCl_{5} + C_{2}Cl_{4} → 2 MoCl_{4} + C_{2}Cl_{6}

Heating α-molybdenum tetrachloride in a sealed container in the presence of molybdenum pentachloride induces conversion to the β polymorph.

== Reactions ==
When heated in an open container, molybdenum tetrachloride evolves chlorine, giving molybdenum trichloride;

2 MoCl_{4} → 2 MoCl_{3} + Cl_{2}

The acetonitrile complex adduct can be prepared by reduction of the pentachloride with acetonitrile:

2 MoCl_{5} + 5 CH_{3}CN → 2 MoCl_{4}(CH_{3}CN)_{2} + ClCH_{2}CN + HCl

The MeCN ligands can be exchanged with other ligands:

MoCl_{4}(CH_{3}CN)_{2} + 2 THF → MoCl_{4}(THF)_{2} + 2 CH_{3}CN

The pentachloride can be reduced to the ether complex MoCl_{4}(Et_{2}O)_{2} using tin powder. It is a beige, paramagnetic solid.
