= Molybdenum(II) bromide =

Names
- IUPAC names Molybdenum(II) bromide Molybdenum dibromide

Identifiers
CAS Number	13446-56-5
3D model (JSmol)	Interactive image
ChemSpider	127051
PubChem CID	144025
CompTox Dashboard (EPA)	DTXSID701045488
- InChI: InChI=1S/2BrH.Mo/h2*1H;/q;;+2/p-2 Key: GMMJTCLAKDKBCZ-UHFFFAOYSA-L; InChI=1/2BrH.Mo/h2*1H;/q;;+2/p-2/rBr2Mo/c1-3-2 Key: GMMJTCLAKDKBCZ-FZEMPDIIAF
- SMILES: Br[Mo]Br

Properties
Chemical formula	MoBr_{2}
Molar mass	255.748 g/mol
Appearance	yellow-red solid
Density	4.88 g/cm^{3}
Melting point	700 °C (1,292 °F; 973 K) (decomposes)
Solubility in water	insoluble
- Except where otherwise noted, data are given for materials in their standard state (at 25 °C [77 °F], 100 kPa). verify (what is ?) Infobox references

Molybdenum(II) bromide is an inorganic compound with the formula MoBr_{2}. It forms yellow-red crystals.

== Preparation ==
Molybdenum(II) bromide is created by the reaction of elemental molybdenum(II) chloride with lithium bromide.

Alternatively, it can be prepared by the disproportionation of molybdenum(III) bromide in a vacuum at 600 °C (1,112 °F).
