= Molybdenum(IV) fluoride =

Names
- IUPAC name Molybdenum(IV) fluoride
- Other names Molybdenum fluoride, Molybdenum tetrafluoride, Tetrafluoromolybdenum

Identifiers
CAS Number	23412-45-5
3D model (JSmol)	Interactive image
ChEBI	CHEBI:30712
ChemSpider	124397
PubChem CID	141030
CompTox Dashboard (EPA)	DTXSID40177967
- InChI: InChI=1S/4FH.Mo/h4*1H;/q;;;;+4/p-4 Key: LNDHQUDDOUZKQV-UHFFFAOYSA-J
- SMILES: [Mo+4].[F-].[F-].[F-].[F-]

Properties
Chemical formula	MoF_{4}
Molar mass	171.93 g/mol
Appearance	green crystals
Solubility in water	reacts with water
- Except where otherwise noted, data are given for materials in their standard state (at 25 °C [77 °F], 100 kPa). Infobox references

Molybdenum(IV) fluoride is a binary compound of molybdenum and fluorine with the chemical formula MoF_{4}.
