= Molybdenum(V) fluoride =

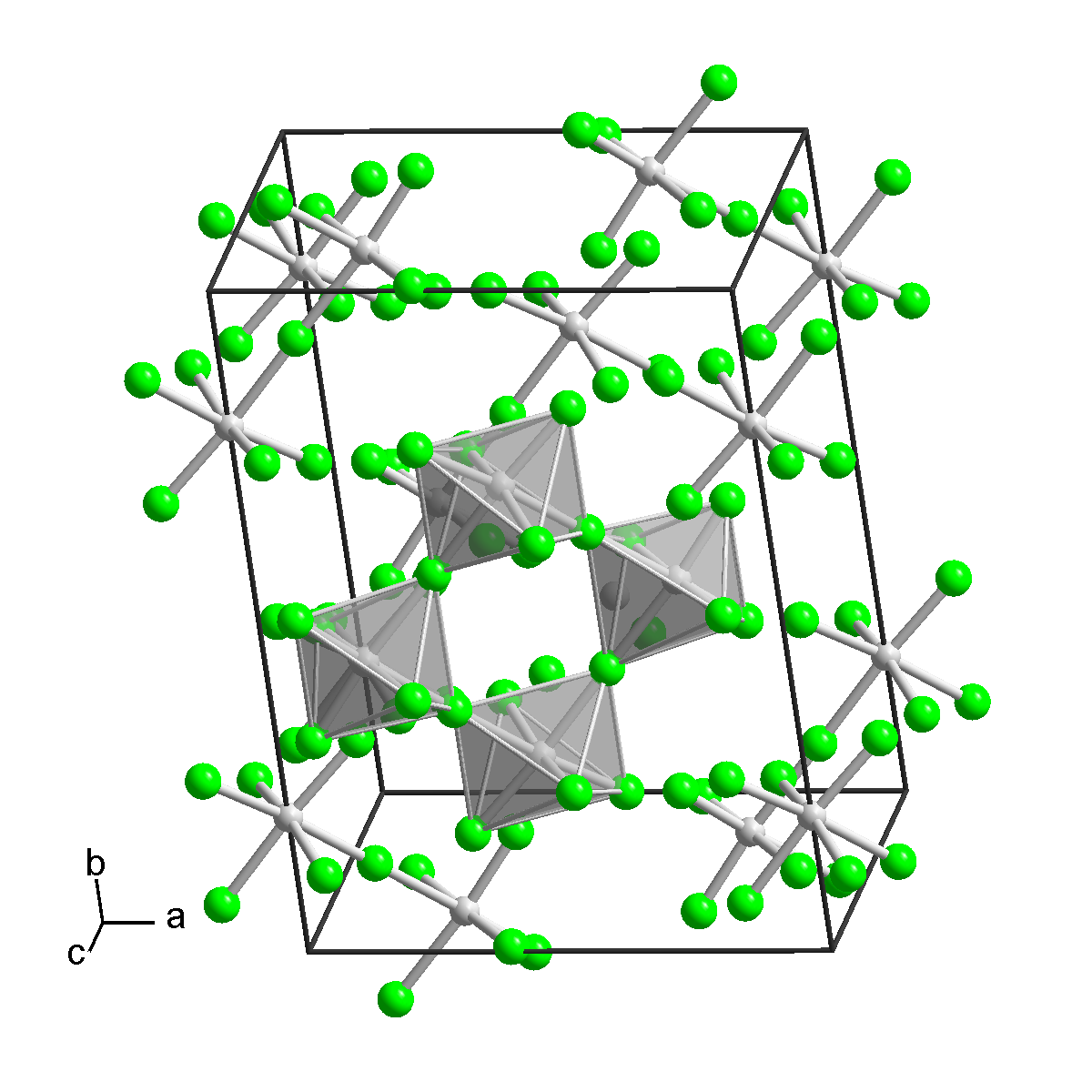
- Molybdenum(V) fluoride

Names
- IUPAC names Molybdenum(V) fluoride Molybdenum pentafluoride

Identifiers
CAS Number	13819-84-6
3D model (JSmol)	Interactive image
ChEBI	CHEBI:30711
ChemSpider	123127
Gmelin Reference	2499
PubChem CID	139613
CompTox Dashboard (EPA)	DTXSID10160528
- InChI: InChI=1S/5FH.Mo/h5*1H;/q;;;;;+5/p-5 Key: NBJFDNVXVFBQDX-UHFFFAOYSA-I
- SMILES: F[Mo](F)(F)(F)F

Properties
Chemical formula	F_{5}Mo
Molar mass	190.94 g·mol^{−1}
Appearance	yellow solid
Density	3.44 g/cm^{3}
Melting point	45.7 °C (114.3 °F; 318.8 K)
Boiling point	50 °C (122 °F; 323 K) (sublimes)

Thermochemistry
Heat capacity (C)	96.6 J/mol·K

Hazards
- Occupational safety and health (OHS/OSH)
Main hazards	oxidizer, hydrolyzes to release HF
Flash point	Non-flammable
- Except where otherwise noted, data are given for materials in their standard state (at 25 °C [77 °F], 100 kPa). verify (what is ?) Infobox references

Molybdenum(V) fluoride is an inorganic compound with the formula MoF_{5}. It is a hygroscopic yellow solid. Like most pentafluorides, it exists as a tetramer.

== Production ==
Molybdenum(V) fluoride is produced by the reaction of molybdenum and molybdenum hexafluoride:

Mo + 5 MoF_{6} → 6 MoF_{5}

It can also be prepared by the reduction of molybdenum hexafluoride with phosphorus trifluoride or tungsten hexacarbonyl, or by the oxidation of elemental molybdenum with fluorine at 900 °C.

About 165 °C, it disproportionates to the tetra- and hexafluoride:

2 MoF_{5} → MoF_{4} + MoF_{6}
