= Molybdenum(VI) chloride =

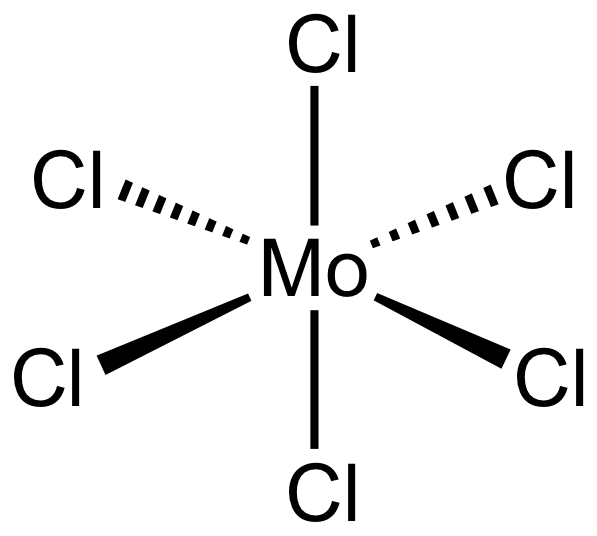

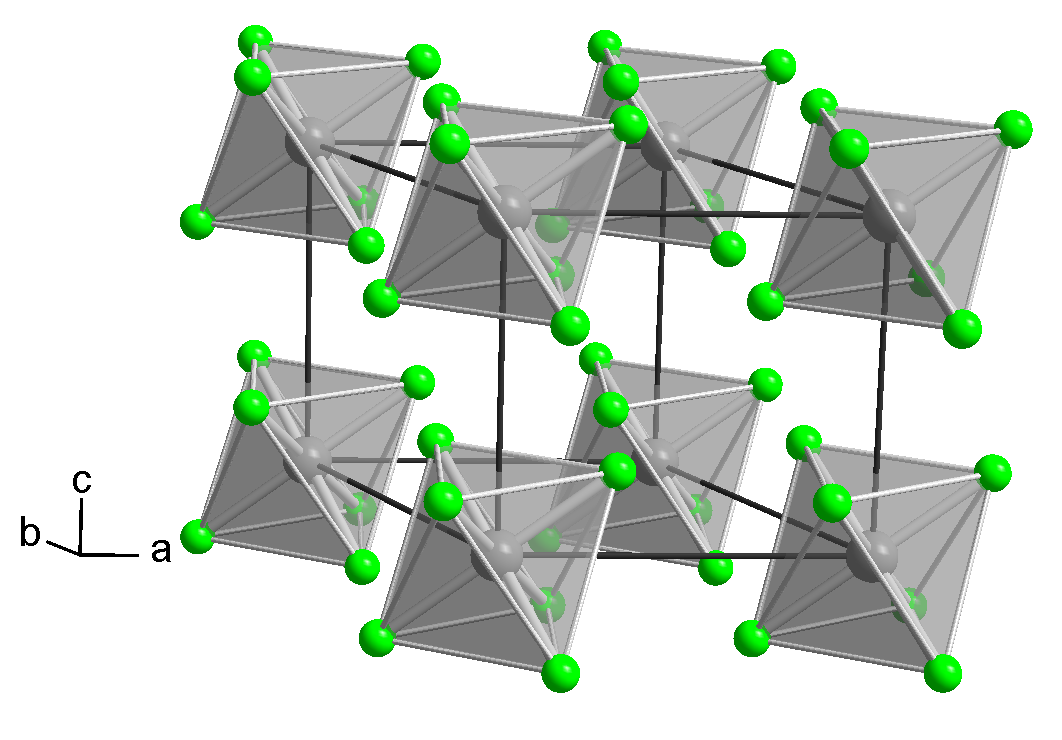

Names
- Other names molybdenum hexachloride

Identifiers
CAS Number	13706-19-9
3D model (JSmol)	Interactive image
ChemSpider	377952
PubChem CID	150193
UNII	779I95MPQK
CompTox Dashboard (EPA)	DTXSID50330162
- InChI: InChI=1S/6ClH.Mo/h6*1H;/q;;;;;;+6/p-6 Key: DBGPLCIFYUHWKA-UHFFFAOYSA-H
- SMILES: Cl[Mo](Cl)(Cl)(Cl)(Cl)Cl

Properties
Chemical formula	MoCl_{6}
Molar mass	308.65 g·mol^{−1}
Appearance	black solid

Related compounds
Related compounds	Molybdenum(VI) fluoride; Molybdenum(V) chloride; Molybdenum(IV) chloride; Molybdenum(III) chloride; Molybdenum(II) chloride
- Except where otherwise noted, data are given for materials in their standard state (at 25 °C [77 °F], 100 kPa). Infobox references

Molybdenum(VI) chloride is the inorganic compound with the formula MoCl_{6}. It is a black diamagnetic solid. The molecules adopt an octahedral structure as seen in β-tungsten(VI) chloride.

== Preparation and reactions ==
Molybdenum(VI) chloride is prepared from the molybdenum hexafluoride with excess boron trichloride:

MoF_{6} + 3 BCl_{3} → MoCl_{6} + 3 BF_{2}Cl

It is unstable at room temperature with respect to molybdenum(V) chloride and chlorine and decomposition completes within several days:

2 MoCl_{6} → [MoCl_{5}]_{2} + Cl_{2}
