= Molybdenum(IV) bromide =

Names
- Other names molybdenum tetrabromide

Identifiers
CAS Number	13520-59-7
3D model (JSmol)	Interactive image; dihydrate: Interactive image
ChemSpider	9103085
PubChem CID	10927841; dihydrate: 139031385
CompTox Dashboard (EPA)	DTXSID00448625
- InChI: InChI=1S/4BrH.Mo/h4*1H;/q;;;;+4/p-4 Key: WWJBJTBTXOHQAZ-UHFFFAOYSA-J; dihydrate: InChI=1S/4BrH.Mo.2H2O/h4*1H;;2*1H2/q;;;;+2;;/p-4 Key: JTPYMODOMPNUHQ-UHFFFAOYSA-J
- SMILES: [Br-].[Br-].[Br-].[Br-].[Mo+4]; dihydrate: O.O.[Br-].[Br-].[Br-].[Br-].[Mo+2]

Properties
Chemical formula	Br_{4}Mo
Molar mass	415.57 g·mol^{−1}
Appearance	black solid
- Except where otherwise noted, data are given for materials in their standard state (at 25 °C [77 °F], 100 kPa). Infobox references

Molybdenum(IV) bromide, also known as molybdenum tetrabromide, is the inorganic compound with the formula MoBr_{4}. It is a black solid. MoBr_{4} has been prepared by treatment of molybdenum(V) chloride with hydrogen bromide:

2 MoCl_{5} + 10 HBr → 2 MoBr_{4} + 10 HCl + Br_{2}

The reaction proceeds via the unstable molybdenum(V) bromide, which releases bromine at room temperature.

Molybdenum(IV) bromide can also be prepared by oxidation of molybdenum(III) bromide with bromine.
