= Molybdenum(III) iodide =

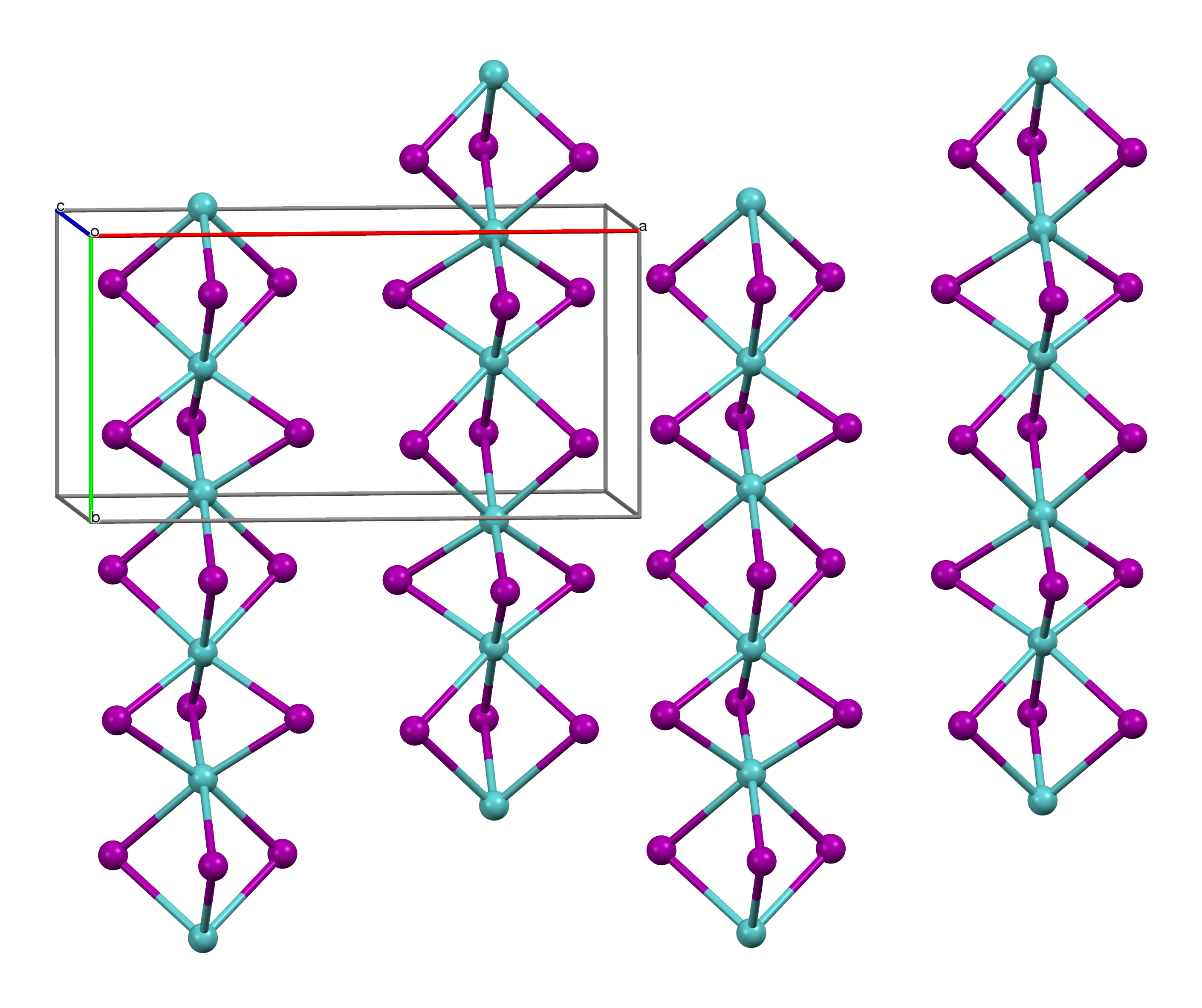
- Molybdenum(III) iodide

Names
- IUPAC names Molybdenum(III) iodide Molybdenum triiodide

Identifiers
CAS Number	14055-75-5
3D model (JSmol)	Interactive image
ChemSpider	4323230
PubChem CID	5149862
CompTox Dashboard (EPA)	DTXSID001045487
- InChI: InChI=1S/3HI.Mo/h3*1H;/q;;;+3/p-3 Key: MMQODXFIGCNBIM-UHFFFAOYSA-K; InChI=1/3HI.Mo/h3*1H;/q;;;+3/p-3 Key: MMQODXFIGCNBIM-DFZHHIFOAA
- SMILES: [Mo](I)(I)I

Properties
Chemical formula	MoI_{3}
Molar mass	476.65 g/mol
Appearance	black solid
Melting point	927 °C (1,701 °F; 1,200 K) (decomposes)
Solubility in water	insoluble
- Except where otherwise noted, data are given for materials in their standard state (at 25 °C [77 °F], 100 kPa). verify (what is ?) Infobox references

Molybdenum(III) iodide is the inorganic compound with the formula MoI_{3}.

== Preparation ==
Molybdenum(III) iodide is created by the reaction of molybdenum hexacarbonyl with iodine gas at 105 °C (221 °F).

2 Mo(CO)_{6} + 3 I_{2} → 2 MoI_{3} + 12 CO

It can also be made from molybdenum(V) chloride and a solution of hydrogen iodide in carbon disulfide.

MoCl_{5} + 5 HI → MoI_{3} + 5 HCl + I_{2}

A further method is direct reaction between molybdenum metal and excess iodine at 300 °C (572 °F).

2 Mo + 3 I_{2} → 2 MoI_{3}

As molybdenum(III) iodide is the highest stable iodide of molybdenum, this is the preferred route.

== Properties ==
Molybdenum(III) iodide is a black antiferromagnetic solid that is air-stable at room temperature. In vacuum, it decomposes above 100 °C to molybdenum(II) iodide and iodine. It is insoluble in polar and non-polar solvents. Its crystal structure is isotypic with zirconium(III) iodide.
