= Molybdenum(II) chloride =

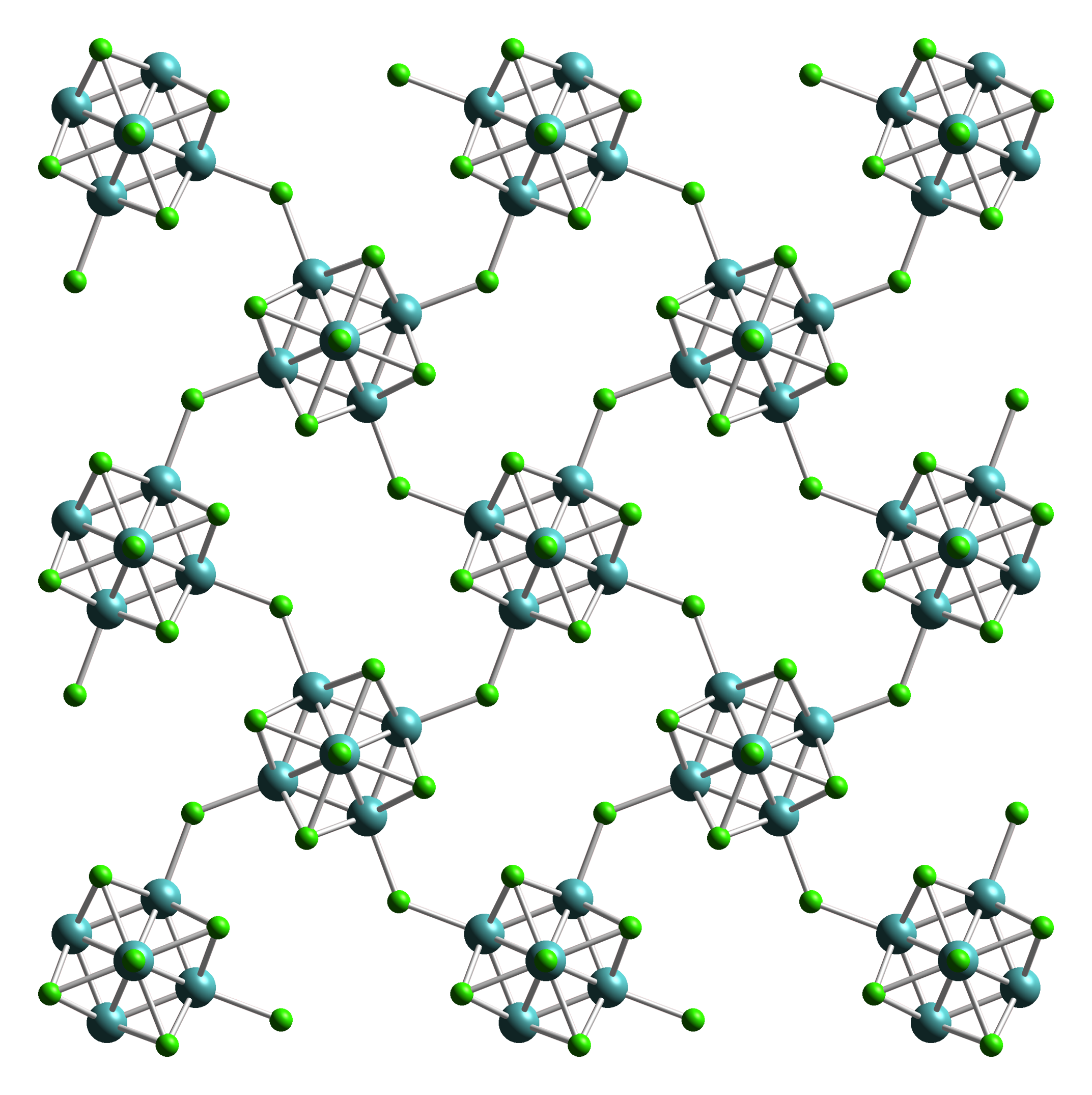

Names
- IUPAC names dichloromolybdenum dodecachlorohexamolybdenum(II)
- Other names molybdenum(II) chloride, molybdenum dichloride

Identifiers
| CAS Number | 13478-17-6 (MoCl_{2}); 11062-51-4 (Mo_{6}Cl_{12}) |
| 3D model (JSmol) | Interactive image |
| ChemSpider | 75349 |
| ECHA InfoCard | 100.033.417 |
| PubChem CID | 83514 |
| CompTox Dashboard (EPA) | DTXSID1065502 |
- InChI: InChI=1S/2ClH.Mo/h2*1H;/q;;+2/p-2 Key: BQBYSLAFGRVJME-UHFFFAOYSA-L; InChI=1/2ClH.Mo/h2*1H;/q;;+2/p-2/rCl2Mo/c1-3-2 Key: BQBYSLAFGRVJME-LYAHSSGUAS
- SMILES: Cl[Mo]Cl

Properties
| Chemical formula | Cl_{12}Mo_{6} |
| Appearance | yellow crystalline solid |
| Density | 3.17 g/cm^{3} |
| Melting point | 530 °C (986 °F; 803 K) |
| Solubility in water | low |

Related compounds
| Related compounds | Molybdenum(III) chloride Molybdenum(IV) chloride Molybdenum(V) chloride Molybdenum(VI) chloride |
- Except where otherwise noted, data are given for materials in their standard state (at 25 °C [77 °F], 100 kPa). Infobox references

Molybdenum dichloride describes chemical compounds with the empirical formula MoCl_{2} and structural formula Mo_{6}Cl_{12}. Molybdenum dichloride and related derivatives have attracted much attention from academic researchers because of the unexpected structures seen for these compounds and the fact that they give rise to hundreds of derivatives. Another known molybdenum(II) chloride complex is potassium octachlorodimolybdate.

== Structure ==
Rather than adopting a close-packed structure typical of metal dihalides, e.g., cadmium chloride, molybdenum(II) chloride forms a structure based on clusters. Molybdenum(II), which is a rather large ion, prefers to form compounds with metal-metal bonds, i.e. metal clusters. In fact all "lower halides" (i.e. where halide/M ratio is <4) in the "early transition metal series (Ti, V, Cr, Mn triads) do. The species Mo_{6}Cl_{12} is polymeric, consisting of cubic Mo_{6}Cl_{8}^{4+} clusters interconnected by chloride ligands that bridge from cluster to cluster. This material converts readily to salts of the dianion [Mo_{6}Cl_{14}]^{2−}. In this anion, each Mo bears one terminal chloride but is otherwise part of an Mo_{6} octahedron embedded inside a cube defined by eight chloride centers. Thus, the coordination environment of each Mo is four triply bridging chloride ligands, four Mo neighbors, and one terminal Cl. The cluster has 24e^{−}, four being provided by each Mo^{2+}.

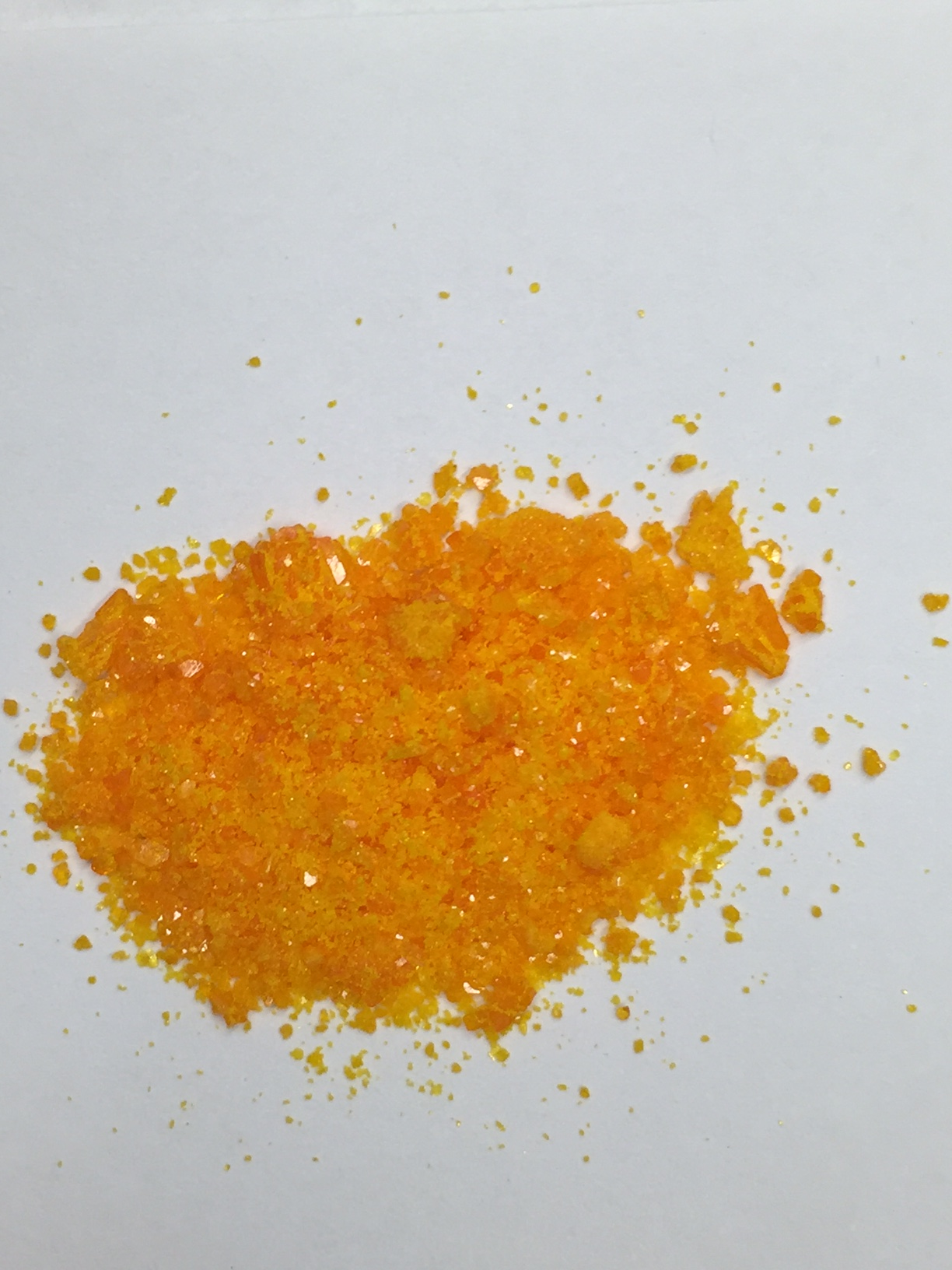
Sample of (NBu_{4})_{2}[Mo_{6}Cl_{14}]

== Synthesis ==
Mo_{6}Cl_{12} is prepared by the reaction of molybdenum(V) chloride with molybdenum metal:

12 MoCl_{5} + 18 Mo → 5 Mo_{6}Cl_{12}

This reaction proceeds via the intermediacy of MoCl_{3} and MoCl_{4}, which are also reduced by the presence of excess Mo metal. The reaction is conducted in a tube furnace at 600–650 °C.

== Reactions ==
Once isolated, Mo_{6}Cl_{12} undergoes many reactions with retention of the Mo_{6}^{12+} core. Heating in concentrated HCl gives (H_{3}O)_{2}[Mo_{6}Cl_{14}]. The terminal chloride ligands, labeled "ausser" are readily exchanged:

(H_{3}O)_{2}[Mo_{6}Cl_{14}] + 6 HI → (H_{3}O)_{2}[Mo_{6}Cl_{8}I_{6}] + 6 HCl

Under more forcing conditions, all 14 ligands can be exchanged, to giving salts of [Mo_{6}Br_{14}]^{2−} and [Mo_{6}I_{14}]^{2−}.

The hexatriflate cluster [Mo_{6}Cl_{8}(O_{3}SCF_{3})_{6}]^{2-} can be prepared similarly.

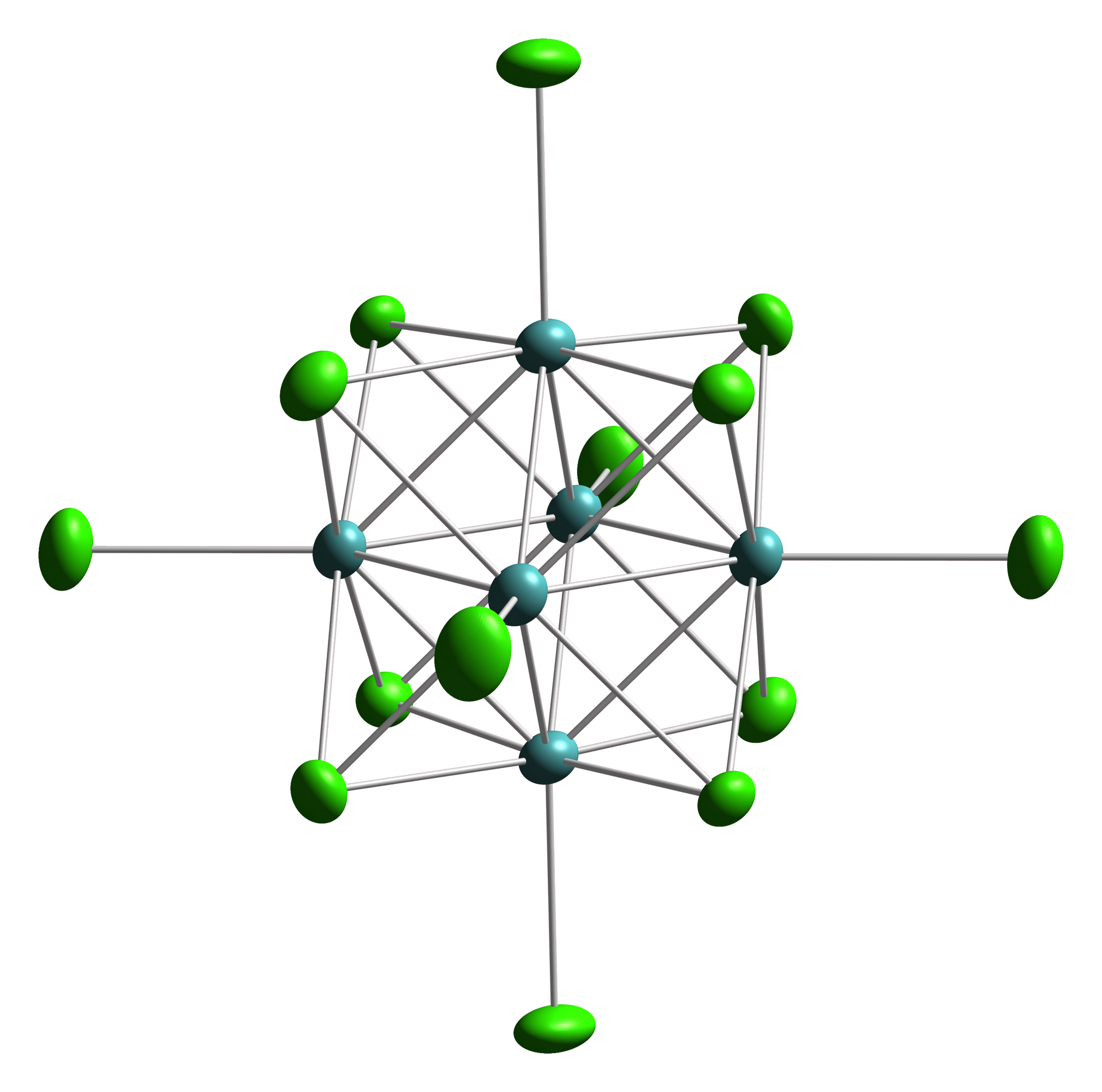
Structure of the cluster anion [Mo_{6}Cl_{14}]^{2−}

.

== Related clusters ==
A variety of clusters are structurally related to [Mo_{6}Cl_{14}]^{2−}. The tungsten analogue is known. Ta and Nb form related clusters where halides are bridge edges of the Ta_{6} octahedron vs faces. The resulting formula is [Ta_{6}Cl_{18}]^{4−}.

Sulfido and selenido derivatives are also well studied. [Re_{6}Se_{8}Cl_{6}]^{4−} has the same number of valence electrons as does [Mo_{6}Cl_{14}]^{2−}.

The Mo-S clusters Mo_{6}S_{8}L_{6}, analogues of the "Chevrel phases", have been prepared by the reaction of sulfide sources with Mo_{6}Cl_{12} in the presence of donor ligands L.
