= Oxohalide =

Chemical compounds with oxygen and a halogen bonded to the same atom

Oxohalides or oxyhalides are a group of chemical compounds with the chemical formula A_{m}O_{n}X_{p}, where X is a halogen, and A is an element different from O and X. Oxohalides are numerous. Molecular oxohalides are molecules, whereas nonmolecular oxohalides are polymeric. Some oxohalides of particular practical significance are phosgene (COCl_{2}), thionyl chloride (SOCl_{2}), and sulfuryl fluoride (SO_{2}F_{2}).

== Synthesis ==
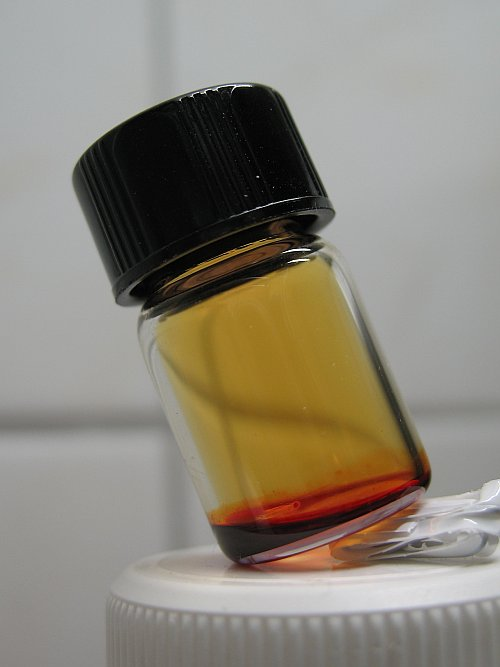
Chromyl chloride liquid and vapour

Oxohalides can be seen as compounds intermediate between oxides and halides. There are three general methods of synthesis:

- Partial oxidation of a halide:
  2 PCl_{3} + O_{2} → 2 POCl_{3}
  - In this example, the oxidation state increases by two and the electrical charge is unchanged.
- Partial halogenation of an oxide:
  2 V_{2}O_{5} + 6 Cl_{2} + 3 C → 4 VOCl_{3} + 3 CO_{2}
- Oxide replacement:
  CrO^{2−}_{4} + 2 Cl^{−} + 4 H^{+} → CrO_{2}Cl_{2} + 4 H_{2}O

In addition, various oxohalides can be made by halogen exchange reactions and this reaction can also lead to the formation of mixed oxohalides such as POFCl_{2} and CrO_{2}FCl.

== Properties ==
In relation to the oxide or halide, for a given oxidation state of an element A, if two halogen atoms replace one oxygen atom, or vice versa, the overall charge on the molecule is unchanged and the coordination number of the central atom decreases by one. For example, both phosphorus oxychloride (POCl_{3}) and phosphorus pentachloride, (PCl_{5}) are neutral covalent compounds of phosphorus in the +5 oxidation state.

Oxohalides of elements in high oxidation states can be strong oxidizing agents, with oxidizing power similar to the corresponding oxide or halide. Most oxohalides are easily hydrolyzed. For example, chromyl chloride is hydrolyzed to chromate in the reverse of the synthetic reaction, above. The driving force for this reaction is the formation of A-O bonds which are stronger than A-Cl bonds. This gives a favourable enthalpy contribution to the Gibbs free energy change for the reaction

Many oxohalides can act as Lewis acids. This is particularly so with oxohalides of coordination number 3 or 4 which, in accepting one or more electron pairs from a Lewis base, become 5- or 6-coordinate. Oxohalide anions such as [VOCl_{4}]^{2−} can be seen as acid-base complexes of the oxohalide (VOCl_{2}) with more halide ions acting as Lewis bases. Another example is VOCl_{2} which forms the trigonal bipyramidal complex VOCl_{2}(N(CH_{3})_{3})_{2} with the base trimethylamine.

The vibrational spectra of many oxohalides have been assigned in detail. They give useful information on relative bond strengths. For example, in CrO_{2}F_{2}, the Cr–O stretching vibrations are at 1006 cm^{−1} and 1016 cm^{−1} and the Cr–F stretching vibrations are at 727 cm^{−1} and 789 cm^{−1}. The difference is much too large to be due to the different masses of O and F atoms. Rather, it shows that the Cr–O bond is much stronger than the Cr–F bond. M–O bonds are generally considered to be double bonds and this is backed up by measurements of M–O bond lengths. It implies that the elements A and O are chemically bound together by a σ bond and a π bond.

Oxohalides of elements in high oxidation states are intensely coloured owing to ligand to metal charge transfer (LMCT) transitions.

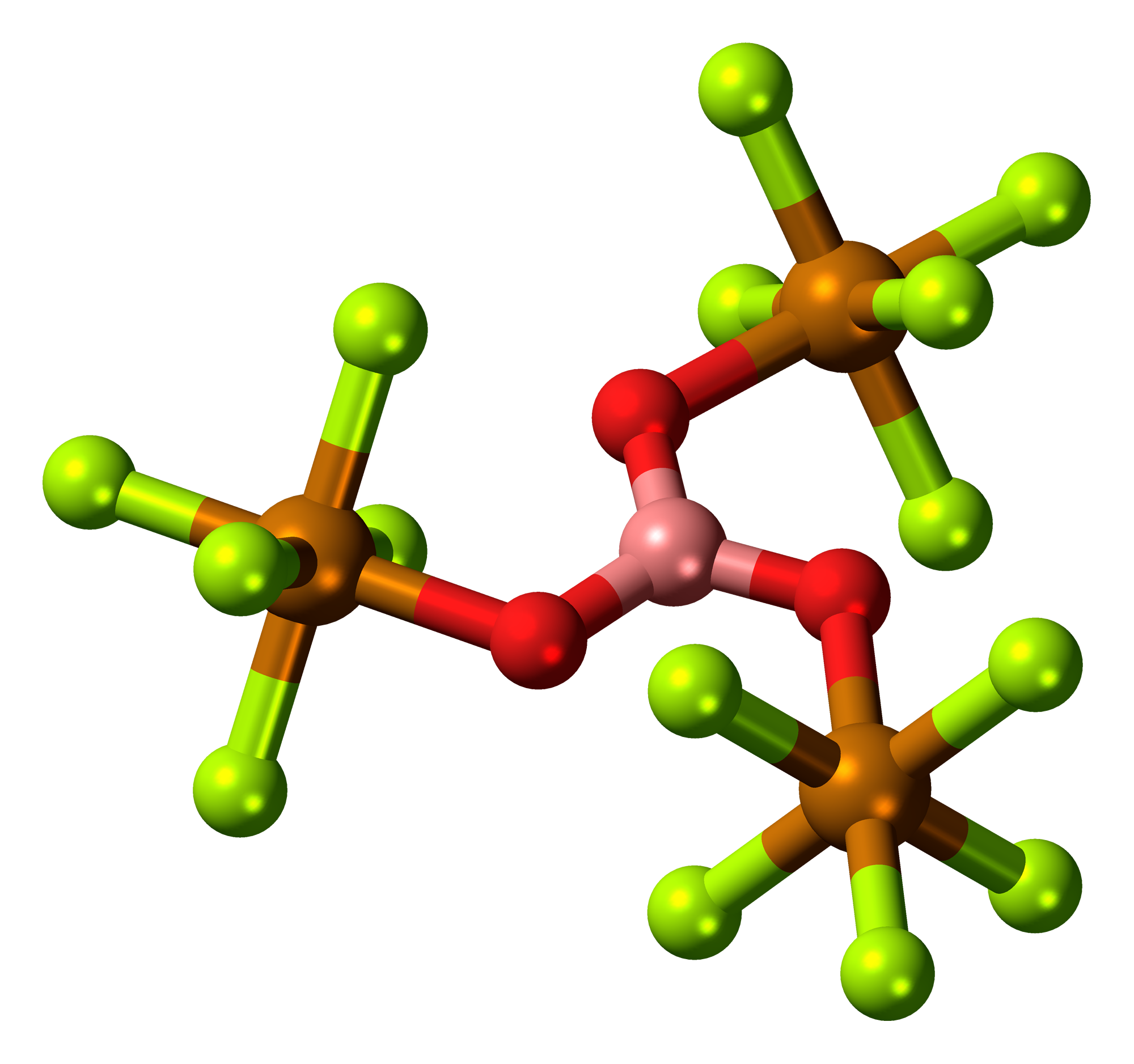
Boron teflate Boron Oxygen Tellurium Fluorine

== Main group elements ==
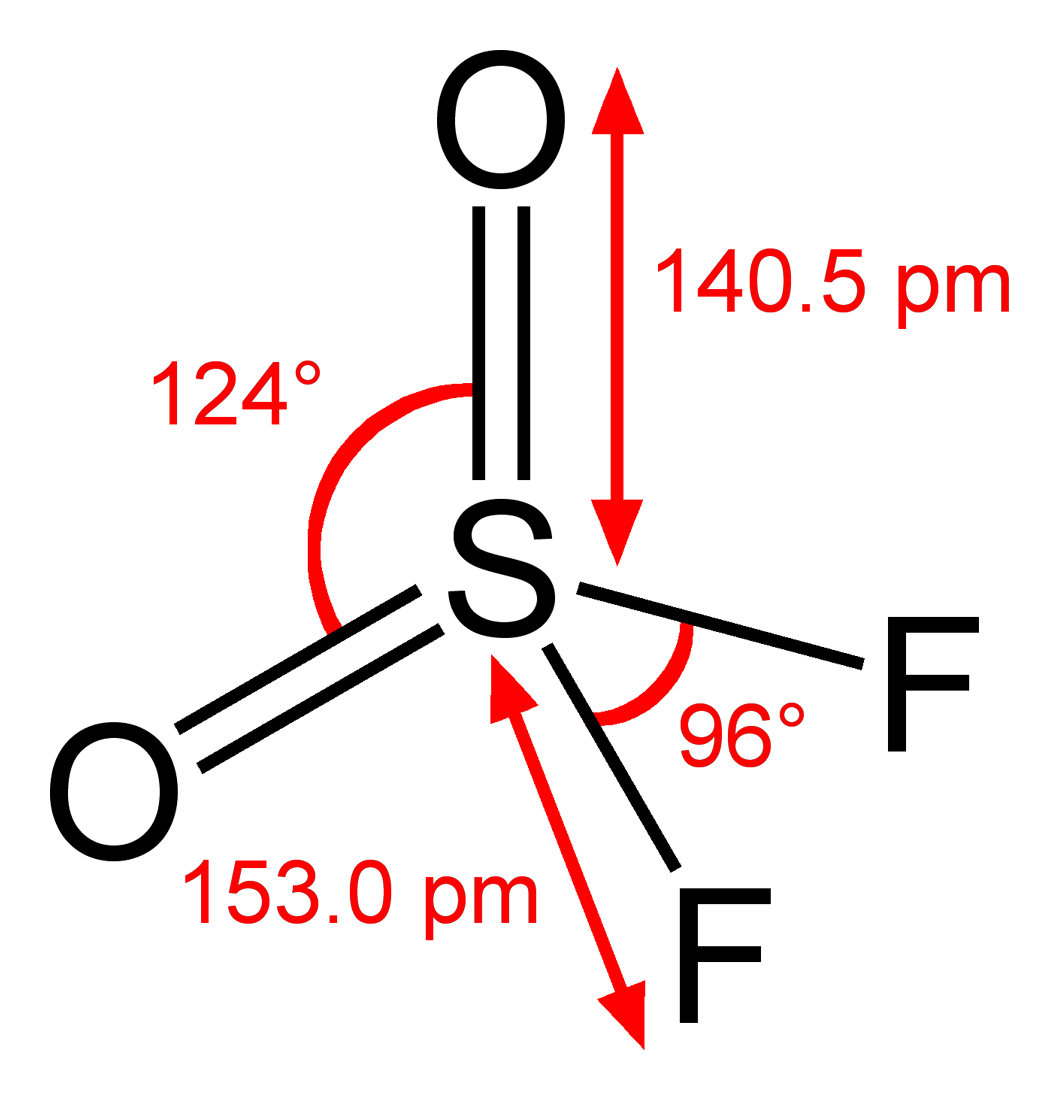
Sulfuryl fluoride

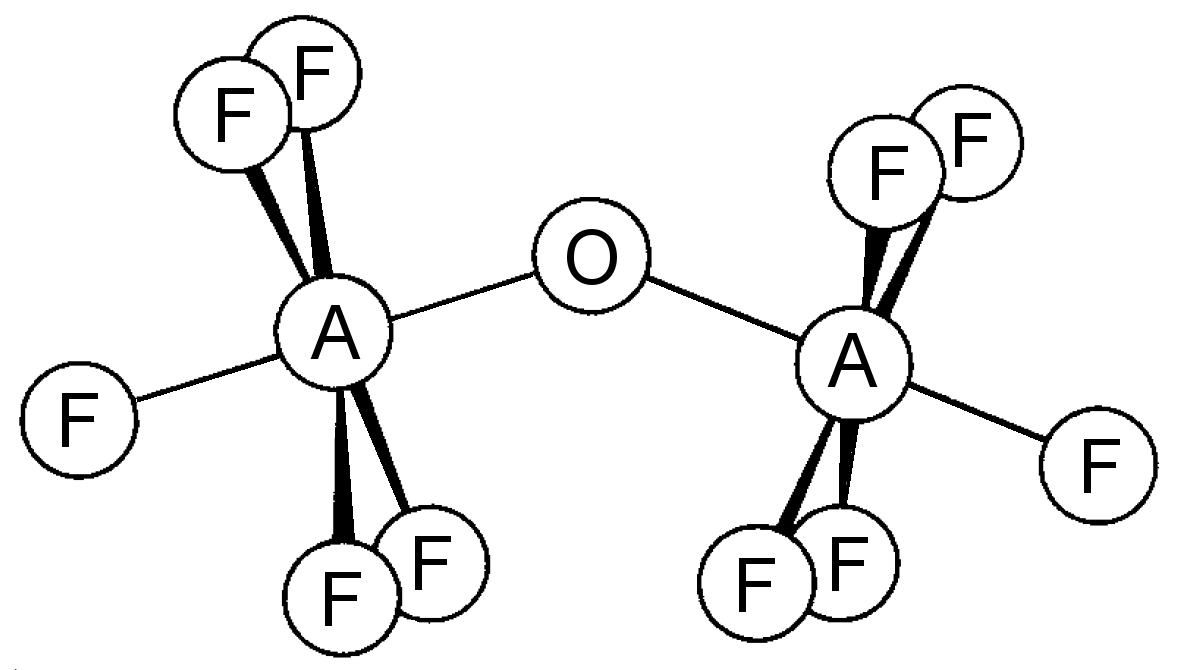
F_{5}AOAF_{5} (A = S, Se, Te)

=== Group XIII ===
Thallium forms oxohalides, but little is known about them.

=== Carbon group ===
Carbon forms oxohalides COX_{2}, X = F, Br, and the very toxic phosgene (X = Cl), which is produced industrially by a carbon-catalyzed reaction of carbon monoxide with chlorine. It is a useful reagent in organic chemistry for the formation of carbonyl compounds. For example:

COCl_{2} + 2 ROH → CO(OR)_{2} + 2 HCl

Silicon tetrafluoride reacts with water to yield poorly-characterized oxyfluoride polymers, but slow and careful reaction at -196 °C yields the oxyfluoride hexafluorodisiloxane as well.

=== Pnictogens ===
Nitrogen forms two series of oxohalides with nitrogen in oxidation states 3, NOX, X = F, Cl, Br and 5, NO_{2}X, X = F, Cl. They are made by halogenation of nitrogen oxides. Note that NO_{2}F is isoelectronic with the nitrate ion, NO^{−}_{3}. Only oxohalides of phosphorus(V) are known. Examples are phosphoryl chloride POCl_{3} and pyrophosphoryl chloride P_{2}O_{3}Cl_{4}.

=== Chalcogens ===
Sulfur forms oxohalides in oxidation state +4, such as thionyl chloride, SOCl_{2} and oxidation state +6, such as sulfuryl fluoride (SO_{2}F_{2}), sulfuryl chloride (SO_{2}Cl_{2}), and thionyl tetrafluoride (SOF_{4}). All are easily hydrolyzed. Indeed, thionyl chloride can be used as a dehydration agent as the water molecules are converted into gaseous products, leaving behind the anhydrous solid chloride.

MgCl_{2}·6H_{2}O + 6 SOCl_{2} → MgCl_{2} + 6 SO_{2} + 12 HCl

Selenium and tellurium form similar compounds and also the oxo-bridged species F_{5}AOAF_{5} (A = S, Se, Te). They are non-linear with the A-O-A angle of 142.5, 142.4 and 145.5° for S, Se and Te, respectively. The tellurium anion F_{5}TeO^{−}, known as teflate, is a large and rather stable anion, useful for forming stable salts with large cations.

=== Halogens ===
The halogens form various oxofluorides with formulas XO_{2}F (e.g. chloryl fluoride), XO_{3}F (e.g. perchloryl fluoride) and XOF_{3} with X = Cl, Br and I. IO_{2}F_{3} and IOF_{5} are also known.

=== Noble gases ===
Xenon forms xenon oxytetrafluoride (XeOF_{4}), xenon dioxydifluoride (XeO_{2}F_{2}) and xenon oxydifluoride (XeOF_{2}).

== Transition metals and actinides ==
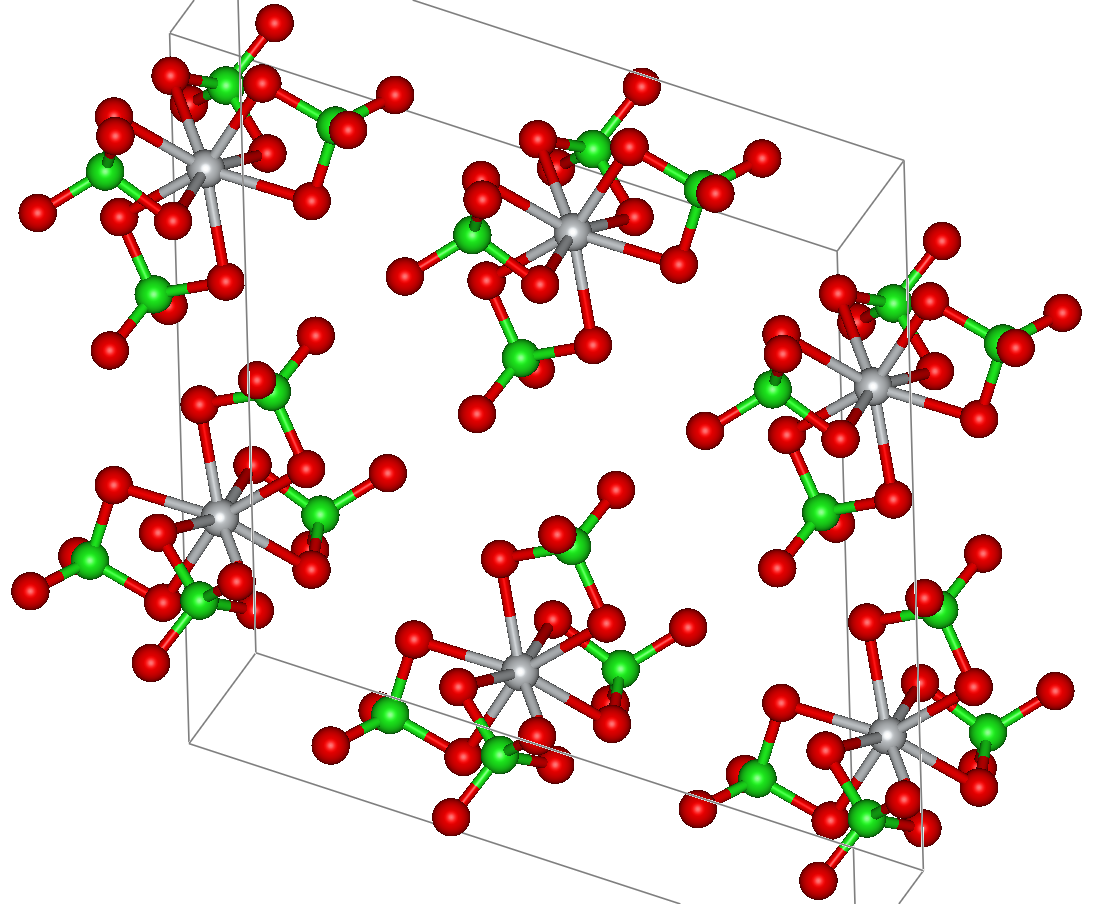
Crystal structure of Ti(ClO_{4})_{4}. Titanium Chlorine Oxygen

A selection of known oxohalides of transition metals is shown below, and more detailed lists are available in the literature. X indicates various halides, most often F and Cl.

Oxidation state	oxohalides
3	VOCl, VOBr, FeOCl
4	[TiOCl_{4}]^{2−}, Cl_{3}TiOTiCl_{3}, VOCl_{2}, [VOCl_{4}]^{2−}
5	VOX_{3}, VO_{2}F, [CrOF_{4}]^{−}, [CrOF_{5}]^{2−}, MnOCl_{3}, TcOCl_{3}, VOF_{3}, VOCl_{3}, NbOCl_{3}
6	CrO_{2}Cl_{2}, [CrO_{3}Cl]^{−}, CrOF_{4}, ReOX_{4}, ReO_{2}F_{2}, OsOF_{4}, CrO_{2}F_{2}, MoOF_{4}, MoOCl_{4}, MoO_{2}Cl_{2}, MoO_{2}F_{2}, WO_{2}Cl_{2}, WO_{2}F_{2}, WOF_{4}, WOCl_{4}
7	MnO_{3}F, ReOF_{5}, ReO_{2}F_{3}, ReO_{3}F, ReO_{3}Cl, OsOF_{5}
8	OsO_{2}F_{4}, OsO_{3}F_{2}

Structure of [Ta_{2}OCl_{10}]^{2−}. Ru, Os form similar complexes.

High oxidation states of the metal are dictated by the fact that oxygen is a strong oxidizing agent, as is fluorine. Bromine and iodine are relatively weak oxidizing agents, so fewer oxobromides and oxoiodides are known. Structures for compounds with d^{0} configuration are predicted by VSEPR theory. Thus, CrO_{2}Cl_{2} is tetrahedral, OsO_{3}F_{2} is trigonal bipyramidal, XeOF_{4} is square pyramidal and OsOF_{5} is octahedral. The d^{1} complex ReOCl_{4} is square pyramidal.

The compounds [Ta_{2}OX_{10}]^{2−} and [M_{2}OCl_{10}]^{4−} (M = W, Ru, Os) have two MX_{5} groups joined by a bridging oxygen atom. Each metal has an octahedral environment. The unusual linear M−O−M structure can be rationalized in terms of molecular orbital theory, indicating the presence of d_{π} — p_{π} bonding between the metal and oxygen atoms. Oxygen bridges are present in more complex configurations like M(cp)_{2}(OTeF_{5})_{2} (M = Ti, Zr, Hf, Mo or W; cp = cyclopentadienyl, η^{5}-C_{5}H_{5}) or [AgOTeF_{5}-(C_{6}H_{5}CH_{3})_{2}]_{2}.

In the actinide series, uranyl compounds such as uranyl chloride (UO_{2}Cl_{2}) and [UO_{2}Cl_{4}]^{2−} are well known and contain the linear UO_{2} moiety. Similar species exist for neptunium and plutonium. The species uranyl fluoride is a complicating contaminant in samples uranium hexafluoride.

== Minerals and ionic compounds ==
Mineral oxohalides are rare, but a few are known, such as bismuth oxochloride (BiOCl, bismoclite). Another mineral is terlinguaite Hg_{2}OCl, formed by the weathering of mercury-containing minerals. Mendipite, Pb_{3}O_{2}Cl_{2}, formed from an original deposit of lead sulfide in a number of stages, is another example of a secondary oxohalide mineral.

The elements iron, antimony, bismuth and lanthanum form oxochlorides of general formula MOCl. MOBr and MOI are also known for Sb and Bi. Many of their crystal structures have been determined.

== See also ==
- Transition metal oxo complex

== Bibliography ==
- Housecroft, C. E. and Sharpe, A. G. Inorganic Chemistry, 2nd ed., Pearson Prentice-Hall 2005. ISBN 0-582-31080-6
- Shriver, D. F. and Atkins, P. W. Inorganic Chemistry, 3rd edn. Oxford University Press, 1999. ISBN 0-19-850330-X
- Wells, A. F. (1962). Structural Inorganic Chemistry (3rd ed.). Oxford: Clarendon Press. pp. 384–392. ISBN 0-19-855125-8..
