= Transition metal oxy chloride complexes =

Structure of [Ta_{2}OCl_{10}]^{2−}. Ru, Os form similar complexes.

In inorganic chemistry, transition metal oxy chloride complexes are coordination complexes that consists of a transition metal coordinated to chloride and oxide ligands. These complexes are molecular (discrete) in contrast to the ternary phase metal oxychloride. The class of complexes is extensive.

== Bonding ==
Chloride and oxide are X-type ligands in coordination chemistry. Chloride is both σ-donor and a weak π-donor. Oxide is strong σ-donor and a strong π-donor. Both occur as terminal ligand and a bridging ligand.

== Molecular M-O-Cl complexes ==
A selection of transition metal oxochloride complexes.

Metal	examples	comment
Ti	[TiOCl_{4}]^{2−}, Cl_{3}TiOTiCl_{3}	exclusively Ti(IV)
V	VOCl_{3}, [VOCl_{4}]^{2−}	exclusively V(V), NbOCl_{3} is polymeric
Ta	[Ta_{2}OCl_{10}]^{2−}	
Cr	CrO_{2}Cl_{2}, [CrO_{3}Cl]^{−}	exclusively Cr(VI)
Mo	MoOCl_{4},	exclusively Mo(VI)
W	WOCl_{4}, [W_{2}O_{4}Cl_{6}]^{2−}	exclusively W(VI)
Re	ReO_{3}Cl, Re_{2}O_{4}Cl_{6}	see
Fe	[Fe_{2}OCl_{6}]^{2-}	corner-shared bitetrahedral
Ru	[Ru_{2}OCl_{10}]^{4−}	corner-shared biooctahedral
Os	[Os_{2}OCl_{10}]^{4−}[OsO_{2}Cl_{4}]^{2−}	osmium oxides are numerous, exception to the pattern that terminal oxo ligands are associated with d^{0} metal centers.

The compounds [Ta_{2}OCl_{10}]^{2−} and [M_{2}OCl_{10}]^{4−} (M = W, Ru, Os) have two MCl_{5} groups joined by a bridging oxygen atom. Each metal has an octahedral environment. The linear M−O−M structure can be rationalized in terms of molecular orbital theory, indicating the presence of d_{π} — p_{π} bonding between the metal and oxygen atoms.

structure of an oxychloride of iron(III)
