= Molybdenum oxychloride =

The molybdenum oxychlorides are a subset of metal oxyhalides. Molybdenum oxychloride may refer to:

- Molybdenum oxytetrachloride, MoOCl_{4}
- Molybdenum dichloride dioxide, MoO_{2}Cl_{2}
- Molybdenum oxydichloride, MoOCl_{2}
