= Molybdenum oxyfluoride =

Molybdenum oxyfluoride may refer to:

- Molybdenum oxytetrafluoride, MoOF_{4}
- Molybdenum difluoride dioxide, MoO_{2}F_{2}

The molybdenum oxyfluorides are a subset of metal oxyhalides.
