= Rhenium oxyfluoride =

Rhenium oxyfluoride may refer to:

- Rhenium oxide pentafluoride, ReOF_{5}
- Rhenium dioxide trifluoride, ReO_{2}F_{3}
- Rhenium trioxide fluoride, ReO_{3}F

The rhenium oxyfluorides are a subset of metal oxyhalides.
