= Rhenium trioxynitrate =

Names
- Other names: Rhenium trioxide nitrate; Rhenium(VII) trioxinitrate

Identifiers
3D model (JSmol)	Interactive image
- InChI: InChI=1S/NO3.3O.Re/c2-1(3)4;;;;/q-1;;;;+1 Key: BWCUOIVXPQXNND-UHFFFAOYSA-N
- SMILES: O=[Re+](=O)=O.[N+](=O)([O-])[O-]

Properties
Chemical formula	ReO_{3}NO_{3}
Molar mass	296.21 g/mol
Appearance	Pale yellow solid
Melting point	75 °C (167 °F; 348 K) (decomposes)
Solubility in water	Reacts
Solubility	Insoluble in carbon tetrachloride and DCM, soluble in N_{2}O_{5}
- Except where otherwise noted, data are given for materials in their standard state (at 25 °C [77 °F], 100 kPa). Infobox references

Rhenium trioxynitrate, also known as rhenium(VII) trioxide nitrate, is a chemical compound with the formula ReO_{3}NO_{3}. It is a white solid that readily hydrolyzes in moist air.

== Preparation and properties ==
Rhenium trioxynitrate is prepared by the reaction of ReO_{3}Cl (produced by reacting rhenium trioxide and chlorine) and dinitrogen pentoxide:

ReO_{3}Cl + N_{2}O_{5} → ReO_{3}NO_{3} + NO_{2}Cl

The ReO_{3}Cl can be replaced with rhenium heptoxide, however, this produces an impure product. This compound reacts with water to produce perrhenic acid and nitric acid.

When heated above 75 °C, it decomposes to rhenium heptoxide, nitrogen dioxide, and oxygen:

4 ReO_{3}NO_{3} → 2 Re_{2}O_{7} + 2 NO_{2} + O_{2}

A graphite intercalation compound can be produced by reacting a mixture of rhenium trioxynitrate and dinitrogen pentoxide with graphite.

== Structure ==
X-ray diffraction and IR spectroscopic evidence rejects the formulations NO_{2}^{+}ReO_{4}^{–} or Re_{2}O_{7}·N_{2}O_{5}, but instead suggests a polymeric structure with a monodentate nitrate ligand.
