= Rhenium oxychloride =

Rhenium oxychloride may refer to:

- Rhenium oxytetrachloride, ReOCl_{4}, a rhenium(VI) compound
- Rhenium trioxide chloride, ReO_{3}Cl, a rhenium(VII) compound

The rhenium oxychlorides are a subset of metal oxyhalides.
