= Tungsten oxyfluoride =

Tungsten oxyfluoride may refer to:

- Tungsten oxytetrafluoride, WOF_{4}
- Tungsten difluoride dioxide, WO_{2}F_{2}

The molybdenum oxyfluorides are a subset of metal oxyhalides.
