= Zirconium trifluoride =

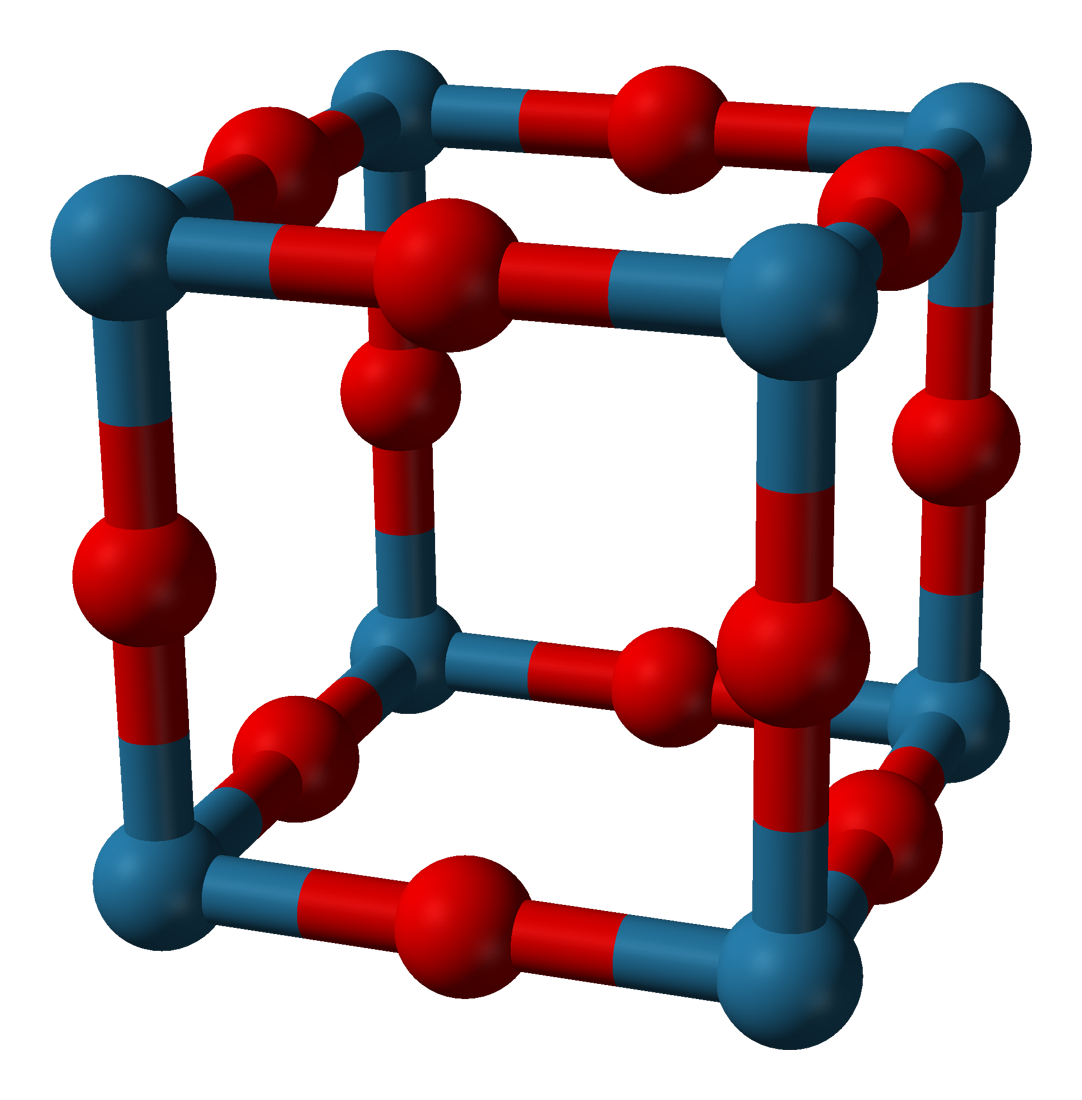

Names
- IUPAC name trifluorozirconium
- Other names Zirconium(III) fluoride

Identifiers
| CAS Number | 13814-22-7 |
| 3D model (JSmol) | Interactive image |
| ChemSpider | 57450832 |
| PubChem CID | 160920222 |
- InChI: InChI=1S/3FH.Zr/h3*1H;/q;;;+3/p-3 Key: SRXSRLDSHFGLBL-UHFFFAOYSA-K
- SMILES: [F-].[F-].[F-].[Zr+3]

Properties
| Chemical formula | ZrF_{3} |
| Appearance | black crystals |
| Density | 4,26 g/cm^{3} |
- Except where otherwise noted, data are given for materials in their standard state (at 25 °C [77 °F], 100 kPa). Infobox references

Zirconium trifluoride is an inorganic chemical compound with the chemical formula ZrF_{3}. This is a salt of zirconium and hydrofluoric acid, forms black crystals.

== Synthesis ==
Zirconium difluoride can be prepared by the action of atomic hydrogen on thin layers of zirconium tetrafluoride, at a temperature of approximately 350°.

Zirconium (III) fluoride can be obtained by reacting hydrogenated zirconium with a mixture of hydrogen fluoride and hydrogen at 750 °C.

2 Zr + 6 HF ⟶ 2 ZrF_{3} + 3 H_{2}

It is also possible to prepare it by reducing (NH_{4})_{2}ZrF_{6} with hydrogen at 650 °C.

== Physical properties ==
ZrF_{3} forms black crystals of the cubic system, in the space group Pm3m.

It is slightly soluble in hot water, slightly soluble in hot acids. It is insoluble in caustic soda and ammonia solution. Its crystal structure corresponds to that of rhenium(VI) oxide.

== Chemical properties ==
ZrF_{3} disproportionates to the tetrafluoride when heated to 1300 °C:

4 ZrF_{3} → 3 ZrF_{4} + Zr
