= Silver perrhenate =

Names
- IUPAC name Silver(1+) perrhenate

Identifiers
CAS Number	7784-00-1
3D model (JSmol)	Interactive image
ChemSpider	9264774
ECHA InfoCard	100.153.139
EC Number	232-042-2
PubChem CID	11089628
CompTox Dashboard (EPA)	DTXSID20228461
- InChI: InChI=1S/Ag.4O.Re/q+1;;;;-1; Key: JRISYOCHUNKJAV-UHFFFAOYSA-N; InChI=1/Ag.4O.Re/q+1;;;;-1;/rAg.O4Re/c;1-5(2,3)4/q+1;-1 Key: JRISYOCHUNKJAV-HGQFXYHCAN
- SMILES: [Ag+].[O-][Re](=O)(=O)=O

Properties
Chemical formula	AgReO_{4}
Molar mass	358.073 g/mol
Density	7.05 g/cm^{3}
Melting point	430 °C (806 °F; 703 K)
Solubility in water	0.01 g/mL (20 °C)
- Except where otherwise noted, data are given for materials in their standard state (at 25 °C [77 °F], 100 kPa). Infobox references

Silver perrhenate is a chemical compound with the formula AgReO_{4}. It is isostructural with the mineral scheelite (CaWO_{4}).

== Properties ==
Silver perrhenate is soluble in O-donor and N-donor solvents as well as aromatic hydrocarbons. It forms solvates with acetonitrile and pyridine, adducts with triphenylphosphine, and 2,2′-Bipyridine.

== Preparation ==
Silver perrhenate can be precipitated by combining rhenium heptoxide and silver nitrate solutions.

== Reactions ==
Silver perrhenate reacts with trimethylsilyl chloride to give the silyl "ester" (CH_{3})_{3}SiOReO_{3}.

It reacts with boron trichloride to form rhenium oxytetrachloride.
