= Chromium oxytetrafluoride =

Names
- IUPAC name Chromium(VI) tetrafluoride oxide
- Other names: Chromium fluoride oxide; Chromium oxide tetrafluoride; Chromium tetrafluoride oxide

Identifiers
CAS Number	23276-90-6
3D model (JSmol)	Interactive image
- InChI: InChI=1S/Cr.4FH.O/h;4*1H;/q+4;;;;;/p-4 Key: MHSCZPAMCXOZTI-UHFFFAOYSA-J
- SMILES: F[Cr](F)(F)(F)=O

Properties
Chemical formula	CrOF_{4}
Molar mass	143.989 g·mol^{−1}
Appearance	purple solid
Melting point	55 °C (131 °F; 328 K)

Related compounds
Other cations	Molybdenum oxytetrafluoride; Tungsten oxytetrafluoride
Related compounds	Chromyl fluoride; Thionyl tetrafluoride
- Except where otherwise noted, data are given for materials in their standard state (at 25 °C [77 °F], 100 kPa). Infobox references

Chromium oxytetrafluoride is an inorganic compound with the formula CrOF_{4}. It is a purple, volatile, diamagnetic solid. The compound is classified as an oxyfluoride.

== Synthesis ==
It can be prepared by fluorination of chromyl fluoride with krypton difluoride:

2 CrO_{2}F_{2} + 2 KrF_{2} → 2 CrOF_{4} + O_{2} + 2 Kr

The compound serves as a weak Lewis base with noble gas difluorides. It also binds fluoride to give the pentafluoride.
