= Manganese trioxide fluoride =

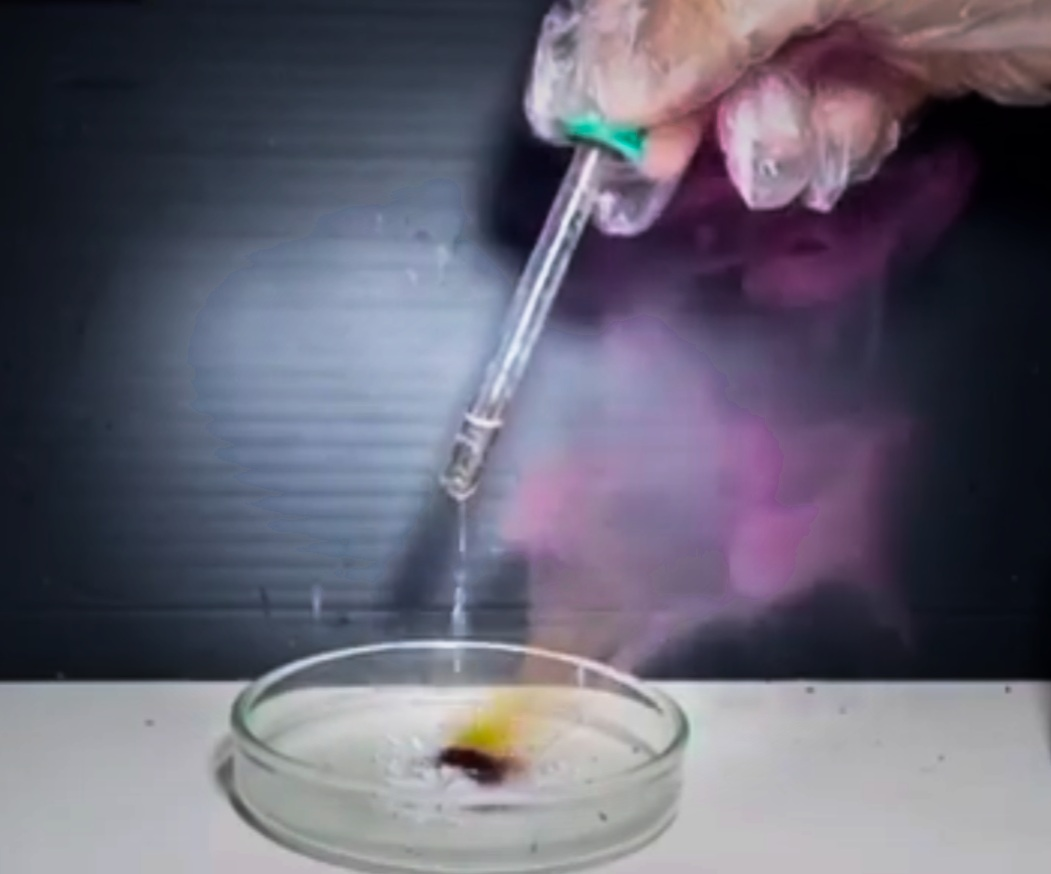

Names
- Other names Permanganyl fluoride

Identifiers
| CAS Number | 15586-97-7 |
| 3D model (JSmol) | Interactive image |
| ChemSpider | 57450402 |
- InChI: InChI=1S/FH.Mn.3O/h1H;;;;/q;+1;;;/p-1 Key: JWSFKFAINKAKTR-UHFFFAOYSA-M
- SMILES: O=[Mn](F)(=O)=O

Properties
| Chemical formula | FMnO_{3} |
| Molar mass | 121.933 g·mol^{−1} |
| Appearance | green liquid |
| Density | 6.042 g/cm^{3} |
| Melting point | −45 °C (−49 °F; 228 K) |
| Boiling point | decomposition above its melting point |
- Except where otherwise noted, data are given for materials in their standard state (at 25 °C [77 °F], 100 kPa). Infobox references

Manganese trioxide fluoride is an inorganic compound with the formula MnO_{3}F. A green diamagnetic liquid, the compound has no applications, but it is of some academic interest as a rare example of a metal trioxide fluoride.

The compound was detected in the 1880s but was only purified and crystallized much more recently. It can be prepared by hydrofluoric acid and potassium permanganate:

KMnO_{4} + 2HF → MnO_{3}F + KF + H_{2}O

MnO_{3}F crystallizes as a monomer, as confirmed by X-ray crystallography. The molecules are tetrahedral with Mn-O and Mn-F distances of 1.59 and 1.72 Å, respectively.

In contrast with MnO_{3}F, TcO_{3}F and ReO_{3}F have more complex structures as solids. The Re compound crystallizes as chains or rings consisting of fluoride-bridge octahedra. TcO_{3}F crystallizes as dimers with fluoride bridges. The rhenium compound also forms stable adducts with Lewis bases, whereas the MnO_{3}F is unstable in the presence of Lewis bases.
