= Tetraethylammonium diiron oxyhexachloride =

Names
- Other names bis(tetraethylammonium) (μ-oxo)bis[trichloroferrate(III)]

Identifiers
CAS Number	87495-23-6
3D model (JSmol)	Interactive image
- InChI: InChI=1S/2C8H20N.6ClH.2Fe.O/c2*1-5-9(6-2,7-3)8-4;;;;;;;;;/h2*5-8H2,1-4H3;6*1H;;;/q2*+1;;;;;;;2*+2;/p-6 Key: HDMQHBMGMOXZQN-UHFFFAOYSA-H
- SMILES: CC[N+](CC)(CC)CC.CC[N+](CC)(CC)CC.Cl[Fe-](Cl)(Cl)O[Fe-](Cl)(Cl)(Cl)

Properties
Chemical formula	C_{16}H_{40}Cl_{6}Fe_{2}N_{2}O
Molar mass	600.90 g·mol^{−1}
Appearance	yellow-brown solid
Density	1.354 g/cm^{3}
- Except where otherwise noted, data are given for materials in their standard state (at 25 °C [77 °F], 100 kPa). Infobox references

Tetraethylammonium diiron oxyhexachloride is the chemical compound with the formula (N(C_{2}H_{5})_{4})_{2}Fe_{2}OCl_{6}. It is the tetraethylammonium salt of [Fe_{2}OCl_{6}]^{2-}. Many related salts of [Fe_{2}OCl_{6}]^{2-} are known. The anion consists of a pair of tetrahedral Fe(III) centers that share a oxo bridging ligand. The salt can be prepared by treatment of tetraethylammonium tetrachloroferrate with sodium trimethylsiloxide.
