= Pertechnetyl fluoride =

Identifiers
CAS Number	42246-22-0
3D model (JSmol)	Interactive image
- InChI: InChI=1S/FH.3O.Tc/h1H;;;;/q;;;;+1/p-1 Key: OYCMXSPACZPBDD-UHFFFAOYSA-M
- SMILES: O=[Tc](=O)(=O)F

Properties
Chemical formula	TcO_{3}F
Molar mass	165.00 g/mol
Appearance	yellow substance
Melting point	18.3 °C (64.9 °F; 291.4 K)
Boiling point	100 °C (212 °F; 373 K)
Solubility in water	insoluble

Related compounds
Related compounds	Lanthanum oxyfluoride
- Except where otherwise noted, data are given for materials in their standard state (at 25 °C [77 °F], 100 kPa). Infobox references

Pertechnetyl fluoride is an inorganic compound, a salt of technetium and hydrofluoric acid with the chemical formula TcO_{3}F. The compound was originally synthesized by H. Selig and G. Malm in 1963.

== Synthesis ==
- Effect of fluorine on technetium(IV) oxide at 150 °C:

3 TcO_{2} + 4 F_{2} → 2 TcO_{3}F + TcF_{6}

- Dissolution of ammonium pertechnetate in anhydrous hydrogen fluoride:

NH_{4}TcO_{4} + 2 HF → TcO_{3}F + NH_{4}F + H_{2}O

== Physical properties ==
The compound forms a yellow substance.

== Chemical properties ==
The compound can be hydrolyzed to produce pertechnetic acid and hydrofluoric acid.

TcO_{3}F + H_{2}O → HTcO_{4} + HF

It also reacts with arsenic pentafluoride or antimony pentafluoride.
