= Rhenium oxytetrachloride =

Names
- Other names: Rhenium chloride oxide; Rhenium tetrachloride monoxide; Rhenium tetrachloride oxide; Tetrachlorooxorhenium; Tetrachlorooxorhenium(VI)

Identifiers
CAS Number	13814-76-1
3D model (JSmol)	Interactive image
ChemSpider	21489677
- InChI: InChI=1S/4ClH.O.Re/h4*1H;;/q;;;;;+4/p-4 Key: ZDJLVKBEIDLNBJ-UHFFFAOYSA-J
- SMILES: O=[Re](Cl)(Cl)(Cl)Cl

Properties
Chemical formula	Cl_{4}ORe
Molar mass	344.01 g·mol^{−1}
Appearance	dark red solid
Melting point	30 °C (86 °F; 303 K)
Boiling point	225 °C (437 °F; 498 K)

Related compounds
Other cations	Molybdenum oxytetrachloride; Tungsten oxytetrachloride
- Except where otherwise noted, data are given for materials in their standard state (at 25 °C [77 °F], 100 kPa). Infobox references

Rhenium oxytetrachloride is an inorganic compound with the chemical formula ReOCl_{4}. It is a dark red solid.

== Structure ==
Infrared and magnetic data indicate square pyramidal geometry.

== Preparation ==
Rhenium oxytetrachloride is prepared by reacting rhenium heptoxide with thionyl chloride. Initially a golden-brown complex of perrhenyl chloride with sulfuryl chloride, (ReO_{3}Cl)_{2},SO_{2}Cl_{2} is gradually deposited. Upon prolonged contact, this rhenium(VII) complex redissolves with reduction to rhenium(VI). On vacuum evaporation of the thionyl chloride supernatant, or of the final solution after redissolution of the complex, the dark red rhenium oxytetrachloride is obtained.

It can also be prepared by heating rhenium pentachloride and dry oxygen in a sealed vessel at 180 °C. Direct chlorination results in an impure product.

Rhenium oxytetrachloride is formed quantitatively by heating rhenium metal in sulfuryl chloride at 300 °C.

== Reactions ==
Upon reaction with pyridine, an oxotrichlorobispyridinerhenium(V) complex is formed.
