= Chromyl fluoride =

Chemical compound

Names
- IUPAC name Difluoro(dioxo)chromium
- Other names Chromyl fluoride, Chromium difluoride dioxide

Identifiers
CAS Number	7788-96-7
3D model (JSmol)	Interactive image
ChemSpider	10329781
EC Number	232-137-9
PubChem CID	71679209
UNII	UB519P5O68
- InChI: InChI=1S/Cr.2FH.2O/h;2*1H;;/q+2;;;;/p-2 Key: FRLBLFFATGQISB-UHFFFAOYSA-L; InChI=1/Cr.2FH.2O/h;2*1H;;/q+2;;;;/p-2/rCrF2O2/c2-1(3,4)5 Key: FRLBLFFATGQISB-UNDMLHRZAG
- SMILES: O=[Cr](=O)(F)F

Properties
Chemical formula	CrO_{2}F_{2}
Molar mass	121.991 g·mol^{−1}
Appearance	Violet-red crystals
Melting point	31.6 °C (88.9 °F; 304.8 K)
Boiling point	30 °C (86 °F; 303 K) Sublimes

Structure
Crystal structure	monoclinic
Space group	P2_{1}/c, No. 14
Point group	C_{2v}
Formula units (Z)	4

Hazards
- Occupational safety and health (OHS/OSH)
Main hazards	Oxidant

Related compounds
Related compounds	Chromyl chloride; Chromium oxytetrafluoride; Uranyl fluoride; Sulfuryl fluoride
- Except where otherwise noted, data are given for materials in their standard state (at 25 °C [77 °F], 100 kPa). verify (what is ?) Infobox references

Chromyl fluoride is an inorganic compound with the formula CrO_{2}F_{2}. It is a violet-red colored crystalline solid that melts to an orange-red liquid.

== Structure ==
The liquid and gaseous CrO_{2}F_{2} have a tetrahedral geometry with C_{2v} symmetry, much like chromyl chloride. Chromyl fluoride dimerizes via fluoride bridges (as O_{2}Cr(μ-F)_{4}CrO_{2}) in the solid state, crystallizing in the P2_{1}/c space group with Z = 4. The Cr=O bond lengths are about 157 pm, and the Cr–F bond lengths are 181.7, 186.7, and 209.4 pm. Chromium resides in a distorted octahedral position with a coordination number of 6.

== History and preparation ==
Pure chromyl fluoride was first isolated in 1952 as reported by Alfred Engelbrecht and Aristid von Grosse. It was first observed as red vapor in the early 19th century upon heating a mixture of fluorspar (CaF_{2}), chromates, and sulfuric acid. These red vapors were initially thought to be CrF_{6}, although some chemists assumed a CrO_{2}F_{2} structure analogous to CrO_{2}Cl_{2}. The first moderately successful synthesis of chromyl fluoride was reported by Fredenhagen who examined the reaction of hydrogen fluoride with alkali chromates. A later attempt saw von Wartenberg prepare impure CrO_{2}F_{2} by treating chromyl chloride with elemental fluorine. Another attempt was made by Wiechert, who treated HF with dichromate, yielding impure liquid CrO_{2}F_{2} at −40 °C.

Engelbrecht and von Grosse's synthesis of CrO_{2}F_{2}, and most successive syntheses, involve treating chromium trioxide with a fluorinating agent:

CrO_{3} + 2 HF → CrO_{2}F_{2} + H_{2}O

The reaction is reversible, as water will readily hydrolyze CrO_{2}F_{2} back to CrO_{3}.

The approach published by Georg Brauer in the Handbook of Preparative Inorganic Chemistry drew on von Wartenberg's approach of direct fluoridation:

CrO_{2}Cl_{2} + F_{2} → CrO_{2}F_{2} + Cl_{2}

Other methods include treatment with chlorine fluoride, carbonyl fluoride, or some metal hexafluorides:

CrO_{3} + 2 ClF → CrO_{2}F_{2} + Cl_{2} + O_{2}
CrO_{3} + COF_{2} → CrO_{2}F_{2} + CO_{2}
CrO_{3} + MF_{6} → CrO_{2}F_{2} + MOF_{4} (M = Mo, W)

The last method involving the fluorides of tungsten and molybdenum are reported by Green and Gard to be very simple and effective routes to large quantities of pure CrO_{2}F_{2}. They reported 100% yield when the reactions were conducted at 120 °C. As expected from the relative reactivities of MoF_{6} and WF_{6}, the molybdenum reaction proceeded more readily than did the tungsten.

== Reactions ==
Chromyl fluoride is a strong oxidizing agent capable of converting hydrocarbons to ketones and carboxylic acids. It can also be used as a reagent in the preparation of other chromyl compounds. Like some other fluoride compounds, CrO_{2}F_{2} reacts with glass and quartz, so silicon-free plastics or metal containers are required for handling the compound. Its oxidizing power in inorganic systems has also been explored. Chromyl fluoride can exchange fluorine atoms with metal oxides:

CrO_{2}F_{2} + MO → MF_{2} + CrO_{3}

where M is a metal. Chromyl fluoride also converts the oxides of boron and silicon to their fluorides.

Chromyl fluoride reacts with alkali and alkaline earth metal fluorides in perfluoroheptane (solvent) to produce orange-colored tetrafluorodioxochromates(VI):

CrO_{2}F_{2} + 2 MF → (M^{+})_{2}[CrO_{2}F_{4}]^{2−}

Chromyl fluoride also reacts with Lewis acids, drawing carboxylate ligands from organic acid anhydrides and producing an acyl fluoride byproduct:

CrO_{2}F_{2} + 2 (CF_{3}CO)_{2}O → (CF_{3}COO)_{2}CrO_{2} + 2 CF_{3}COF

Chromyl fluoride forms adducts with weak Lewis bases NO, NO_{2}, and SO_{2}.

Chromium oxytetrafluoride is prepared by fluorination of chromyl fluoride with krypton difluoride:

2 CrO_{2}F_{2} + 2 KrF_{2} → 2 CrOF_{4} + O_{2} + 2 Kr
