= Molybdenum dichloride dioxide =

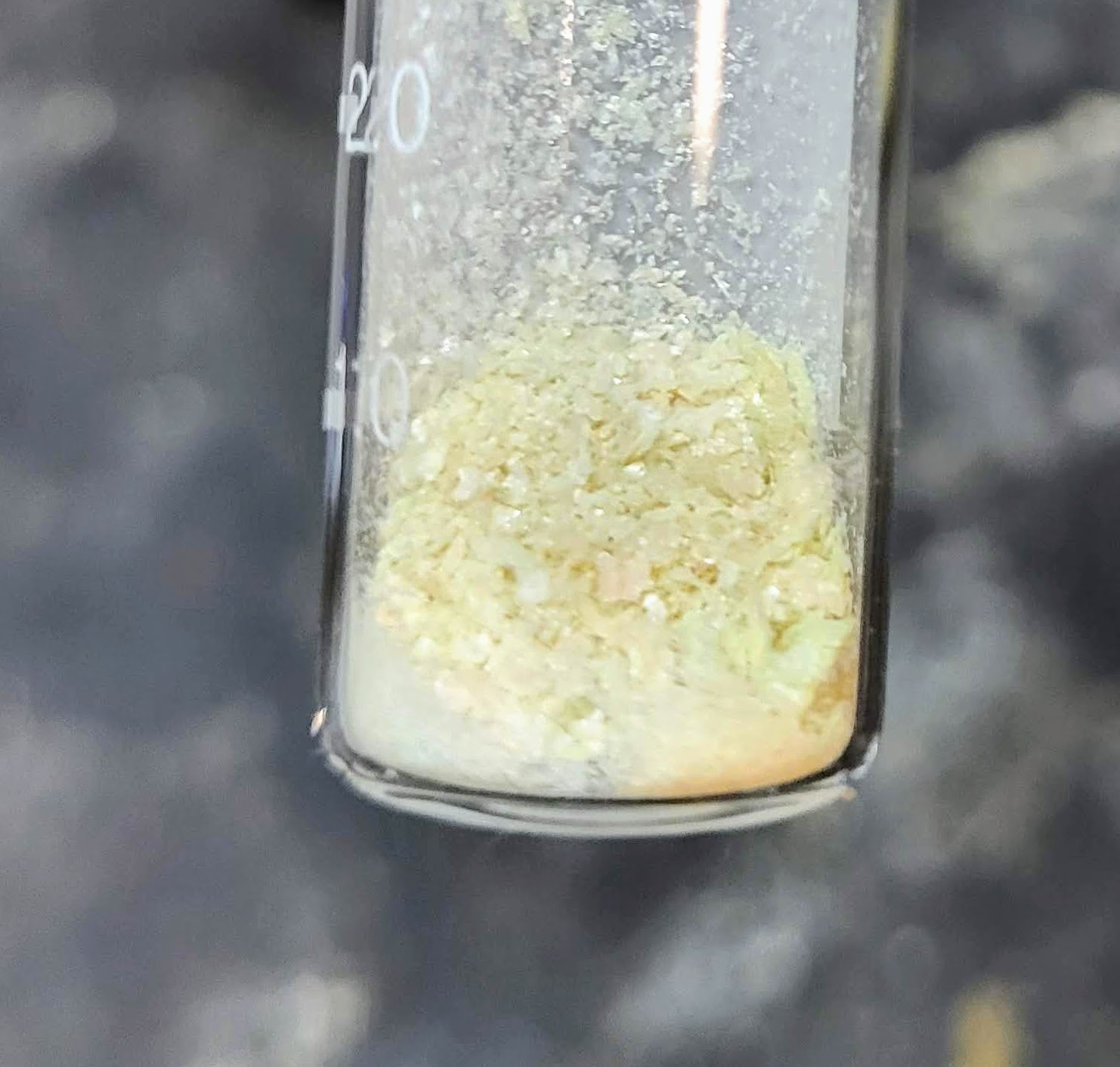

Identifiers
CAS Number	13637-68-8
3D model (JSmol)	Interactive image
ChemSpider	11252244
ECHA InfoCard	100.157.480
EC Number	629-286-0
PubChem CID	86628431
- InChI: InChI=1S/2ClH.Mo.2O/h2*1H;;;/q;;+2;;/p-2 Key: JCFNAADCQWXIJD-UHFFFAOYSA-L
- SMILES: [Mo](Cl)(Cl)(=O)=O

Properties
Chemical formula	MoO_{2}Cl_{2}
Molar mass	198.85 g·mol^{−1}
Appearance	yellow or cream solid
Melting point	175 °C (347 °F; 448 K)

Hazards
- GHS labelling
Pictograms	(GHS05: Corrosive)
Signal word	Danger
Hazard statements	H314

Related compounds
Related compounds	Molybdenum difluoride dioxide; Molybdenum oxytetrachloride; Molybdenum(VI) chloride; Uranyl chloride
- Except where otherwise noted, data are given for materials in their standard state (at 25 °C [77 °F], 100 kPa). Infobox references

Molybdenum dichloride dioxide is the inorganic compound with the formula MoO_{2}Cl_{2}. It is a yellow diamagnetic solid that is used as a precursor to other molybdenum compounds. Molybdenum dichloride dioxide is one of several oxychlorides of molybdenum.

== Structure ==
Gaseous molybdenum dichloride dioxide is a monomer, but upon condensation, it polymerizes to give a coordination polymer of uncertain structure.

== Preparation ==
MoO_{2}Cl_{2} can also be prepared from MoOCl_{4}:

MoOCl_{4} + O(Si(CH_{3})_{3})_{2} → MoO_{2}Cl_{2} + 2 ClSi(CH_{3})_{3}

It is also prepared by chlorination of molybdenum dioxide and molybdenum trioxide:

MoO_{2} + Cl_{2} → MoO_{2}Cl_{2}
MoO_{3} + Cl_{2} → MoO_{2}Cl_{2}

== Reactions ==
Many bisadducts are known of the type MoO_{2}Cl_{2}(ether)_{2}. These octahedral molecular complexes are soluble in organic solvents. The adduct with dimethylsulfoxide can be readily prepared by treatment molybdenum trioxide with concentrated hydrochloric acid:

MoO_{3} + 2 HCl + 2 L → MoO_{2}Cl_{2}L_{2} + H_{2}O

When treated with bulky anilines, MoO_{2}Cl_{2} converts to diimido complexes, one of which is MoCl_{2}(=N−Ar)_{2}(dimethoxyethane). This complex is the precursor to the Schrock carbenes of the type Mo(OR)_{2}(=N−Ar)(=CH−tBu).

== See also ==
- Molybdenum oxytetrachloride, MoOCl_{4}
- Molybdenum oxydichloride, MoOCl_{2}
