= Vanadium(V) oxytrifluoride =

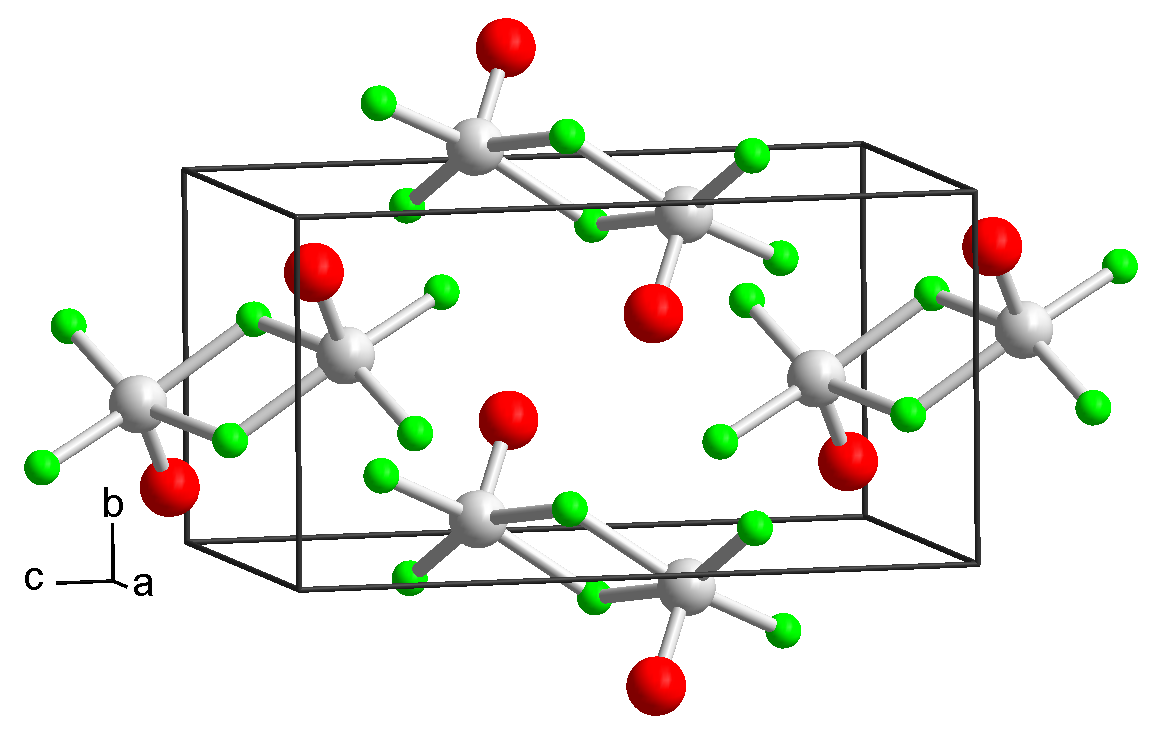

Names
- Other names: Vanadium oxyfluoride; Trifluorooxovanadium

Identifiers
CAS Number	13709-31-4
3D model (JSmol)	monomer: Interactive image; dimer: Interactive image
ChemSpider	10329766
ECHA InfoCard	100.033.849
- InChI: InChI=1S/3FH.O.V/h3*1H;;/q;;;;+3/p-3 Key: FXGIDXZUDLFPLD-UHFFFAOYSA-K
- SMILES: monomer: O=[V](F)(F)F; dimer: O=[V-](F)(F)([F+]1)[F+][V-]1(F)(=O)F

Properties
Chemical formula	VOF_{3}
Molar mass	123.94 g/mol
Appearance	yellowish orange powder
Density	2.4590 g/cm^{3}
Melting point	300 °C (572 °F; 573 K)
Boiling point	480 °C (896 °F; 753 K)
Solubility in water	insoluble

Hazards
- GHS labelling
Pictograms	(GHS05: Corrosive) (GHS06: Toxic) (GHS07: Exclamation mark)
Signal word	Danger
Hazard statements	H302, H312, H314, H332
Precautionary statements	P260, P264, P270, P271, P280, P301+P310, P301+P312, P301+P330+P331, P302+P352, P303+P361+P353, P304+P312, P304+P340, P305+P351+P338, P310, P312, P322, P330, P361, P363, P405, P501
NFPA 704 (fire diamond)	3

Related compounds
Related compounds	Vanadium(V) fluoride Vanadium(V) oxytrichloride Vanadium dioxyfluoride
- Except where otherwise noted, data are given for materials in their standard state (at 25 °C [77 °F], 100 kPa). verify (what is ?) Infobox references

Vanadium(V) oxytrifluoride is a chemical compound with the formula VOF_{3}. It is one of several vanadium(V) oxyhalides. VOF_{3} is a yellowish orange powder that is sensitive to moisture. Characteristic of early metal fluorides, the structure is polymeric in the solid state. The solid adopts a layered structure but upon evaporation, the species becomes dimeric. In contrast VOCl_{3} and VOBr_{3} remain tetrahedral in all states, being volatile liquids at room temperature.

== Reactions ==
In organic synthesis, VOF_{3} is used for the oxidative coupling of phenols, for example in the syntheses of vancomycin and its analogues. For these applications VOF_{3} is typically dissolved in trifluoroacetic acid.

Vanadium(V) oxytrifluoride reacts with hexamethyldisiloxane to give vanadium dioxide fluoride:

(CH_{3})_{3}SiOSi(CH_{3})_{3} + VOF_{3} → VO_{2}F + 2 (CH_{3})_{3}SiF
