= Vanadium dioxide fluoride =

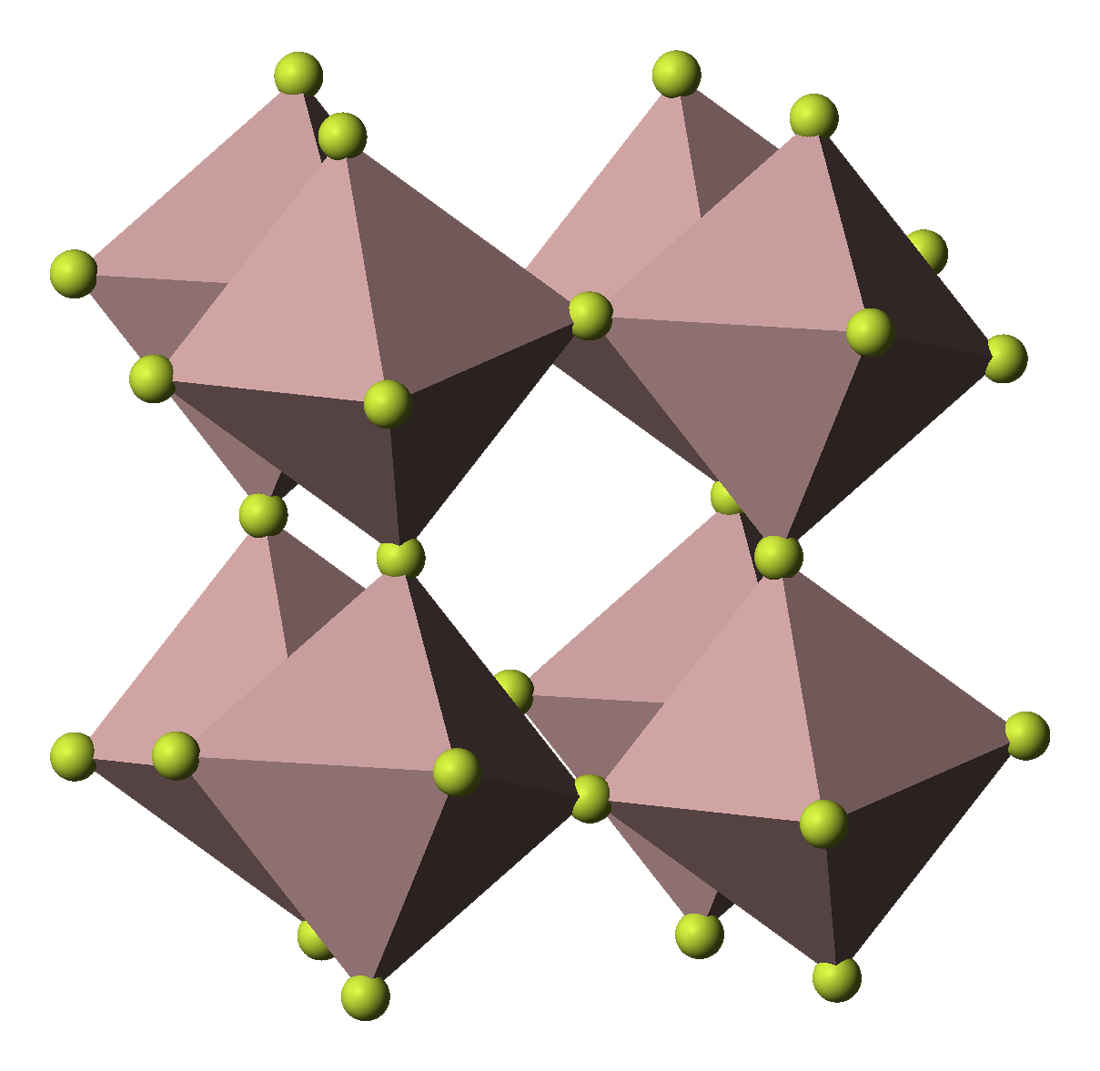

Identifiers
CAS Number	14259-82-6
3D model (JSmol)	Interactive image
- InChI: InChI=1S/FH.2O.V/h1H;;;/q;;;+1/p-1 Key: LEFMSXWIPZZRSQ-UHFFFAOYSA-M
- SMILES: O=[V](F)=O

Properties
Chemical formula	VO_{2}F
Molar mass	101.938 g/mol
Appearance	orange solid
Density	3.41 g/cm^{3}
- Except where otherwise noted, data are given for materials in their standard state (at 25 °C [77 °F], 100 kPa). Infobox references

Vanadium dioxide fluoride is the inorganic compound with the formula VO_{2}F. It is an orange diamagnetic solid. The compound adopts the same structure as iron(III) fluoride, with octahedral metal centers and doubly bridging oxide and fluoride ligands. It is prepared by the reaction of vanadium pentoxide and vanadium(V) oxytrifluoride:

V_{2}O_{5} + VOF_{3} → 3VO_{2}F

An alternative synthesis using hexamethyldisiloxane:

(CH_{3})_{3}SiOSi(CH_{3})_{3} + VOF_{3} → VO_{2}F + 2 (CH_{3})_{3}SiF

== Reactions ==
Like some other transition metal oxyfluorides, VO_{2}F reacts with Lewis bases to give 1:2 adducts. One example is the yellow bis(pyridine) derivative VO_{2}F(NC_{5}H_{5})_{2}.

VO_{2}F has attracted some interest as a cathode in batteries.
