= Chromyl chloride =

Wireframe model of chromyl chloride
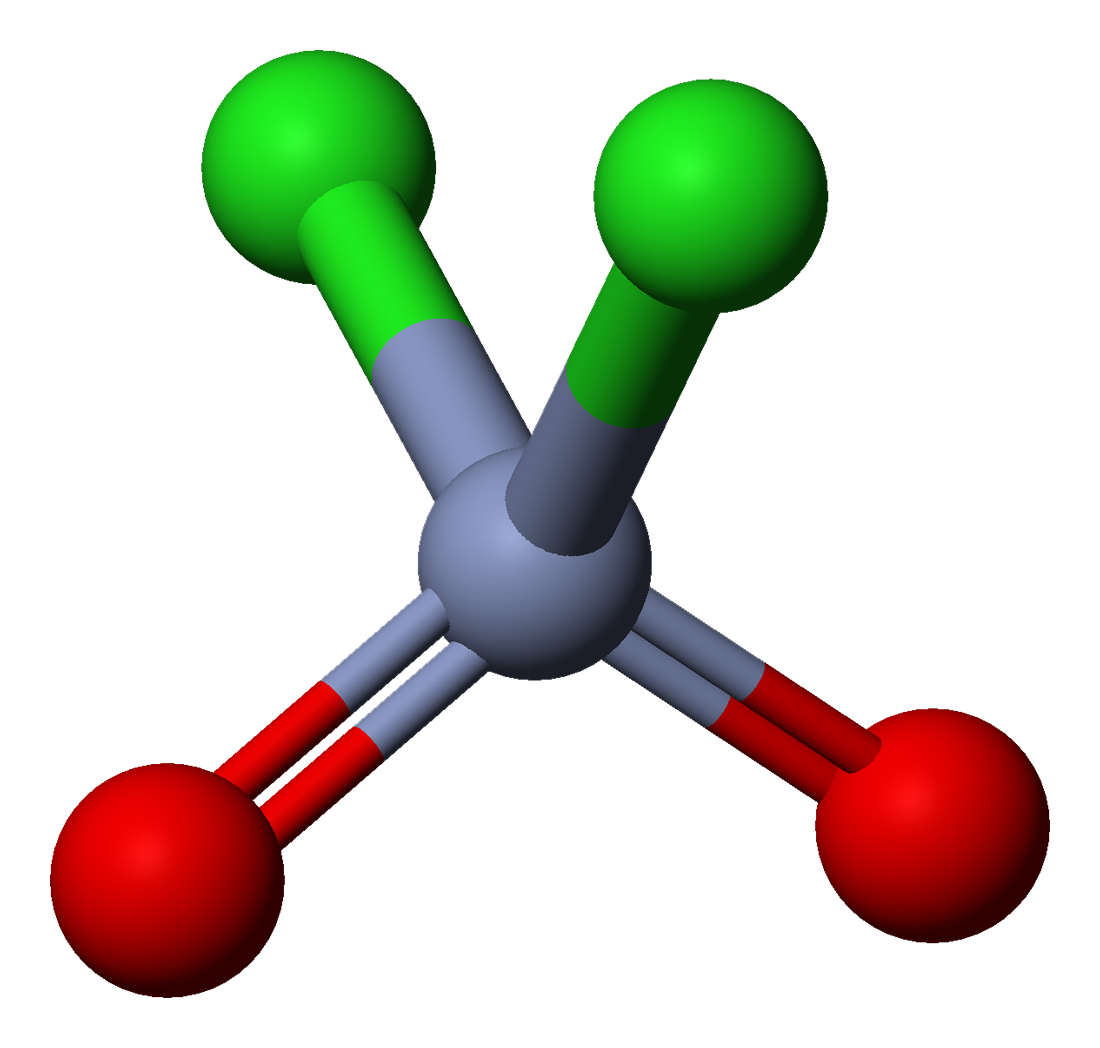
Ball and stick model of chromyl chloride
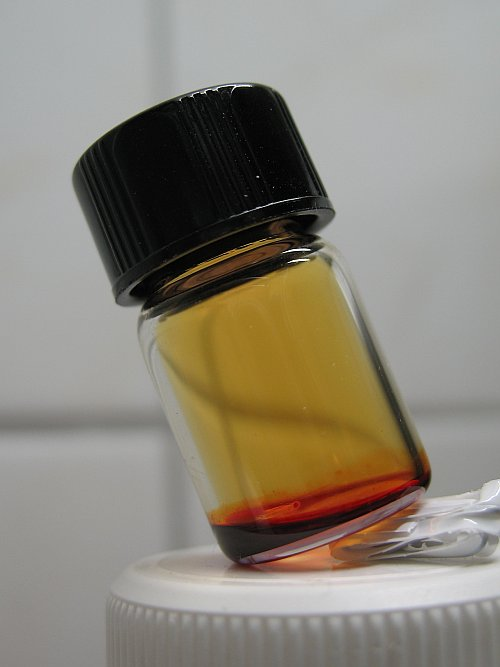
- Chromyl chloride in vial

Names
- Preferred IUPAC name Chromium(VI) dichloride dioxide
- Systematic IUPAC name Dichloridodioxidochromium
- Other names Chromic acid chloride Chromium oxychloride Chromic oxychloride Étard reagent Chlorochromic anhydride Chromium chloride oxide Chromium dioxide dichloride Chromium dioxychloride

Identifiers
CAS Number	14977-61-8
3D model (JSmol)	Interactive image
ChEBI	CHEBI:33038
ChemSpider	21106426
ECHA InfoCard	100.035.491
EC Number	239-056-8
Gmelin Reference	2231
PubChem CID	22150757
RTECS number	GB5775000
UNII	JQU316FZ5W
UN number	1758
CompTox Dashboard (EPA)	DTXSID30894858
- InChI: InChI=1S/2ClH.Cr.2O/h2*1H;;;/q;;+2;;/p-2 Key: AHXGRMIPHCAXFP-UHFFFAOYSA-L; InChI=1S/2ClH.Cr.2O/h2*1H;;;/q;;+2;;/p-2 Key: AHXGRMIPHCAXFP-UHFFFAOYSA-L; InChI=1/2ClH.Cr.2O/h2*1H;;;/q;;+2;;/p-2/rCl2CrO2/c1-3(2,4)5 Key: AHXGRMIPHCAXFP-GRYJOLFGAD
- SMILES: Cl[Cr](Cl)(=O)=O

Properties
Chemical formula	CrO_{2}Cl_{2}
Molar mass	154.9008 g/mol
Appearance	Blood-red fuming liquid, similar to bromine
Odor	Musty, burning, acrid
Density	1.911 g/mL, liquid
Melting point	−96.5 °C (−141.7 °F; 176.7 K)
Boiling point	118.5 °C (245.3 °F; 391.6 K)
Solubility in water	Reacts with water
Vapor pressure	20 mmHg (20 °C)

Hazards
- Occupational safety and health (OHS/OSH)
Main hazards	Toxic, oxidizer, carcinogenic, mutagenic, reacts violently with water
- GHS labelling
Pictograms	(GHS03: Oxidizing) (GHS05: Corrosive) (GHS07: Exclamation mark) (GHS08: Health hazard) (GHS09: Environmental hazard)
Signal word	Danger
Hazard statements	H271, H314, H317, H340, H350, H410
Precautionary statements	P201, P210, P280, P303+P361+P353, P305+P351+P338+P310, P308+P313
NFPA 704 (fire diamond)	3 0 2 W; OX
Flash point	noncombustible
- NIOSH (US health exposure limits)
PEL (Permissible)	none
REL (Recommended)	Ca TWA 0.001 mg Cr(VI)/m^{3}
IDLH (Immediate danger)	N.D.
Safety data sheet (SDS)	Sigma Aldrich - Chromyl Chloride

Related compounds
Related compounds	Sulfuryl chloride Vanadium oxytrichloride Molybdenum dichloride dioxide Tungsten dichloride dioxide Chromyl fluoride Uranyl chloride
- Except where otherwise noted, data are given for materials in their standard state (at 25 °C [77 °F], 100 kPa). verify (what is ?) Infobox references

Chromyl chloride is an inorganic compound with the formula CrO_{2}Cl_{2} and is the formal dichloride of chromic acid. It is a reddish brown compound that is a volatile liquid at room temperature, which is unusual for transition metal compounds.

== Preparation ==
Chromyl chloride can be prepared by the reaction of potassium chromate or potassium dichromate with hydrogen chloride in the presence of concentrated sulfuric acid, followed by distillation.

K_{2}Cr_{2}O_{7} + 6 HCl → 2 CrO_{2}Cl_{2} + 2 KCl + 3 H_{2}O

The sulfuric acid serves as a dehydration agent. This reaction, the chloride test, gives a strikingly red product. It was once used as a test for chloride. No similar compound is formed in the presence of fluoride, bromide, iodide, or cyanide, making this test specific to chlorides.

It can also be prepared directly by exposing chromium trioxide to anhydrous hydrogen chloride gas.

CrO_{3} + 2 HCl ⇌ CrO_{2}Cl_{2} + H_{2}O

When trityl chloride is used in place of HCl, the products are CrO_{2}Cl_{2}, trityl chlorochromate CrO_{2}Cl(OCPh_{3}) and chromate CrO_{2}(OCPh_{3})_{2} (Ph = C_{6}H_{5}).

== Reactions ==
Chromyl chloride is a Lewis acid, and a highly aggressive oxidant. It reacts with cyclohexane to give chlorocyclohexane, chlorocyclohexanone, and other species.

Chromyl chloride oxidizes internal alkenes to alpha-chloroketones or related derivatives. It will also attack benzylic methyl groups to give aldehydes via the Étard reaction. Dichloromethane is a suitable solvent for these reactions.

When treated with conventional Lewis bases, chromyl chloride forms adducts, such as CrO_{2}Cl_{2}(2,2'-bipy):

CrO_{_{2}}Cl_{_{2}} + 2 L → CrO_{_{2}}Cl_{_{2}}L_{_{2}}

== Safety considerations ==
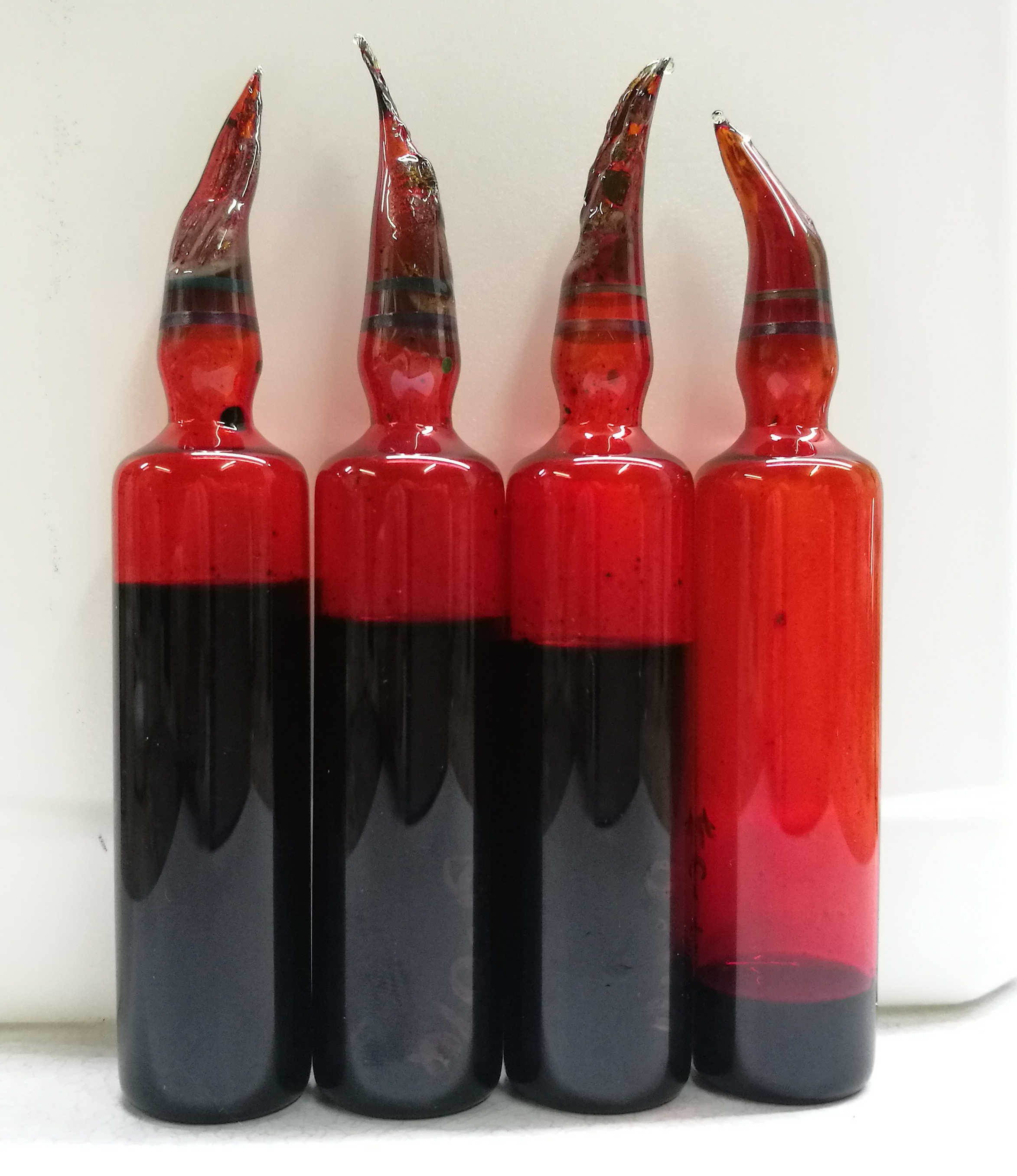
Chromyl chloride is often stored in sealed glass ampoules to prevent vapours leaking out of the container

Chromyl chloride is severely corrosive and easily burns the skin and eyes. It is a probable human carcinogen.
