= Rhenium trioxide fluoride =

Identifiers
CAS Number	42246-24-2
3D model (JSmol)	monomer: Interactive image; hexamer: Interactive image
- InChI: InChI=1S/FH.3O.Re/h1H;;;;/q;;;;+1/p-1 Key: YDGWOHYNESLUAQ-UHFFFAOYSA-M
- SMILES: monomer: O=[Re](=O)(=O)F; hexamer: O0[Re-]9(=O)(=O)(O1)[F+][Re-]1(=O)(=O)(O1)[F+][Re-]1(=O)(=O)(O1)[F+][Re-]1(=O)(=O)(O1)[F+][Re-]1(=O)(=O)(O1)[F+][Re-]01(=O)(=O)[F+]9

Properties
Chemical formula	FO_{3}Re
Molar mass	253.202 g·mol^{−1}
Appearance	white
Density	6.042 g/cm^{3}
- Except where otherwise noted, data are given for materials in their standard state (at 25 °C [77 °F], 100 kPa). Infobox references

Rhenium trioxide fluoride is an inorganic compound with the formula ReO_{3}F. It is a white, sublimable, diamagnetic solid, although impure samples appear colored. It one of the few oxyfluorides of rhenium, the other major one being rhenium dioxide trifluoride ReO_{2}F_{3} . The material has no applications, but it is of some academic interest as a rare example of a trioxide fluoride.

== Synthesis and reactions ==
Rhenium trioxide fluoride can be prepared by fluorination of rhenium trioxide:

2 ReO_{3} + F_{2} → 2ReO_{3}F

With Lewis bases (L) the compound forms adducts with the formula ReO_{3}FL_{2}, e.g., L = diethyl ether and acetonitrile.

== Structure and related compounds ==
According to X-ray crystallography, the compound adopts a helical chain structure featuring octahedral Re centers linked by two fluoride and two oxide bridging ligands. In contrast with ReO_{3}F, TcO_{3}F and MnO_{3}F crystallize with simpler structures. The Mn compound crystallizes as a tetrahedral monomer. The technetium compound TcO_{3}F crystallizes as dimers with fluoride bridges. Also contrasting with the structure of rhenium trioxide fluoride is that of rhenium trioxide chloride, which is a monomer.
