= Tungsten oxytetrafluoride =

Tungsten(VI) oxytetrafluoride
- Tungsten(VI) oxytetrafluoride

Identifiers
CAS Number	13520-79-1
3D model (JSmol)	Interactive image
ChemSpider	10329780
PubChem CID	139487 formula error
CompTox Dashboard (EPA)	DTXSID801306401
- InChI: InChI=1S/4FH.O.W/h4*1H;;/q;;;;;+4/p-4 Key: UZQPVNLRTKDHNK-UHFFFAOYSA-J
- SMILES: O=[W](F)(F)(F)F

Properties
Chemical formula	WOF_{4}
Molar mass	275.83 g·mol^{−1}
Appearance	colourless crystals
Density	5.07 g/cm^{3}
Melting point	110 °C (230 °F; 383 K)
Boiling point	185 °C (365 °F; 458 K)
Solubility in water	reacts
Solubility	soluble in chloroform sparingly soluble in carbon disulfide

Structure
Crystal structure	monoclinic

Related compounds
Other anions	Tungsten(VI) oxytetrachloride; Tungsten(VI) oxytetrabromide
Other cations	Chromium oxytetrafluoride; Molybdenum oxytetrafluoride
Related compounds	Tungsten difluoride dioxide
- Except where otherwise noted, data are given for materials in their standard state (at 25 °C [77 °F], 100 kPa). verify (what is ?) Infobox references

Tungsten oxytetrafluoride is an inorganic compound with the formula WOF_{4}. It is a colorless diamagnetic solid. The compound is one of many oxides of tungsten. It is usually encountered as product of the partial hydrolysis of tungsten hexafluoride.

== Structure ==
As confirmed by X-ray crystallography, WOF_{4} crystallizes as a tetramer. The oxides are terminal, and four of the fluorides are bridging. Its structure is similar to those for niobium pentafluoride and tantalum pentafluoride. In contrast, molybdenum oxytetrafluoride adopts a polymeric structure, although again the fluorides bridge and the oxides are terminal.

In the gas state, this molecule is a monomer. It can form complexes with acetonitrile and other compounds.

== Preparation ==
Tungsten(VI) oxytetrafluoride can be synthesized by the reaction of fluorine and tungsten trioxide.

It can also be obtained by treating tungsten with a mixture of oxygen and fluorine at high temperatures. Partial hydrolysis of tungsten hexafluoride also produces WOF_{4}.

WF_{6} + H_{2}O → WOF_{4} + 2 HF

The reaction of tungsten(VI) oxytetrachloride and hydrogen fluoride also produces WOF_{4}.

WOCl_{4} + 4 HF → WOF_{4} + 4 HCl

WOF_{4} can also prepared by the reaction of lead(II) fluoride and tungsten trioxide at 700 °C.

2 PbF_{2} + WO_{3} → WOF_{4} + 2 PbO

Tungsten(VI) oxytetrafluoride hydrolyzes into tungstic acid.

WOF_{4} + 2 H_{2}O → WO_{3} + 4 HF
