= Rhenium dioxide trifluoride =

Identifiers
CAS Number	57246-89-6
3D model (JSmol)	monomer: Interactive image; trimer: Interactive image; tetramer: Interactive image
- InChI: InChI=1S/3FH.2O.Re/h3*1H;;;/q;;;;;+3/p-3 Key: MVRQLRVXKVDVMG-UHFFFAOYSA-K
- SMILES: monomer: O=[Re](F)(F)(F)=O; trimer: [F+]1[Re-](=O)(F)(F)(=O)[F+][Re-](=O)(F)(F)(=O)[F+][Re-]1(=O)(F)(F)=O; tetramer: F[Re-]1(F)(=O)(=O)[F+][Re-](=O)(F)(F)(=O)[F+][Re-](=O)(F)(F)(=O)[F+][Re-](=O)(F)(F)(=O)[F+]1

Properties
Chemical formula	F_{3}O_{2}Re
Molar mass	275.200 g·mol^{−1}
Appearance	white
Density	5.161 g/cm^{3}
Melting point	35 °C; 95 °F; 308 K
- Except where otherwise noted, data are given for materials in their standard state (at 25 °C [77 °F], 100 kPa). Infobox references

Rhenium dioxide trifluoride is an inorganic compound with the formula ReO_{2}F_{3}. A white diamagnetic solid, it one of the few oxyfluorides of rhenium, another being rhenium trioxide fluoride, ReO_{3}F. The material is of some academic interest as a rare example of an dioxide trifluoride. It can be prepared by the reaction of xenon difluoride and rhenium trioxide chloride:

2 ReO_{3}Cl + 3 XeF_{2} → 2 ReO_{2}F_{3} + O_{2} + Cl_{2} + 3 Xe

According to X-ray crystallography, the compound can exist in four polymorphs. Two polymorphs adopt chain-like structures featuring octahedral Re centers linked by bridging fluorides. Two other polymorphs adopt cyclic structures (ReO_{2}F_{3})_{3} and (ReO_{2}F_{3})_{4}, again featuring octahedral Re centers and bridging fluorides. Like related oxyfluorides, these coordination oligomers break up in the presence of Lewis bases. Adducts of the formula ReO_{2}F_{3}L where L = acetonitrile have been crystallized.
