= Molybdenum oxydichloride =

Identifiers
3D model (JSmol)	Interactive image
- InChI: InChI=1S/2ClH.Mo.O/h2*1H;;/q;;+4;-2/p-2 Key: BDMWKAQMHIHTON-UHFFFAOYSA-L
- SMILES: Cl[Mo+2]Cl.[O-2]

Properties
Chemical formula	Cl_{2}MoO
Molar mass	182.85 g·mol^{−1}
Density	3.6–3.8 g/cm^{3}

Structure
Crystal structure	monoclinic (100 K)
Space group	C2/m (No. 12)
Lattice constant	a = 1.280 nm, b = 0.378 nm, c = 0.657 nm α = 90°, β = 105.78°, γ = 90°
Lattice volume (V)	0.30332 nm^{3}
Formula units (Z)	4 units per cell

Related compounds
Related compounds	Molybdenum dichloride dioxide
- Except where otherwise noted, data are given for materials in their standard state (at 25 °C [77 °F], 100 kPa). Infobox references

Molybdenum oxydichloride (MoOCl_{2}) is a layered van der Waals material. Its molybdenum is in the +4 oxidation state. It is notable for its extreme in-plane optical anisotropy (hyperbolic behavior in the visible range).

== Structure ==
MoOCl_{2} has a monoclinic crystal system with a layered van der Waals structure. It features quasi-one-dimensional Mo chains with orbital-selective Peierls distortion: Mo–Mo dimerization along the b-axis (leading to more localized/insulating character) versus metallic/dispersive behavior along the a-axis (Mo–O chains). This creates strong in-plane anisotropy—metallic-like (ε₁ < 0) along *a*, dielectric (ε₁ > 0) along b and c.

The structure consists of interconnected Mo-centered octahedra (Mo bonded to O and Cl), forming easily exfoliable layers held by weak van der Waals forces.

== Preparation ==
Common methods include:

- Chemical transport reaction for high-quality single crystals: This typically involves reacting MoCl_{3} with MoO_{3} (molar ratio ~2:1) in a sealed quartz ampoule under argon or mild vacuum, with a temperature gradient (e.g., source at ~400 °C, sink at ~300 °C, then controlled cooling). Needle-like crystals form, with a metallic sheen.
- Direct chlorination: Molybdenum oxides (MoO_{2} or MoO_{3}) can be combined with Cl_{2} gas at elevated temperatures. This is common for bulk/powder forms but can yield fluffy, low-density material; post-processing (sublimation/re-aggregation under reduced pressure) improves density and purity for CVD/ALD precursors.

== Reactions ==
- Coordination chemistry: Acts as a precursor or forms adducts/complexes with ligands (e.g., phosphines like PMe_{3} yielding mer-MoOCl_{2}(PMe_{3})_{3 or} chalcogenoethers). It can undergo redox or ligand exchange. Related Mo(V) species like MoOCl_{3} are more commonly studied in coordination contexts.
- Hydrolysis/solvolysis: MoOCl_{2} is sensitive to moisture. It can dissolve in water (depending on form—compact vs. fluffy) forming molybdate species. The crystals are relatively stable in ambient conditions for optical studies.
- Precursor: It is used in material synthesis (e.g., for other Mo compounds) or as a CVD/ALD source for molybdenum-containing films (though MoO_{2}Cl_{2} is more common for some applications).
- Its "bad metal" electronic structure influences solid-state behavior more than solution reactivity.
- Stability: Air-stable as bulk/exfoliated flakes for many experiments; inert conditions are required or long-term purity.

== Anistropy ==
MoOCl_{2} exhibits broadband in-plane hyperbolicity that spans the visible to near-infrared spectrum, driven by a Drude-like response. Thin MoOCl_{2} (∼100–200 nm) flakes achieve >80% reflectivity along the metallic axis and >50% transmission along the perpendicular dielectric axis. This enables polarization extinction with minimal loss. In-plane dielectric permittivity anisotropy exceeds |Δ(ε∥)| > 10 for wavelengths above 600 nm.

Spectroscopic ellipsometry, Mueller matrix, and reflectance measurements reveal MoOCl_{2}'s optical duality: a metallic optical response (ε1 < 0) along the crystallographic a-axis and a dielectric response (ε1 > 0) along the orthogonal directions. This dichotomy drives an epsilon-near-zero (ENZ) condition at ≈512 nm and results in a giant in-plane birefringence of Δn ≈ 2.2 for MoOCl_{2}.

Time-resolved photoemission electron microscopy allows nanoscale visualization of long-range anisotropic plasmon polariton (LRAPP) dynamics with propagation lengths larger than 10 µm on a flake of MoOCl_{2}, some three times longer than previously reported with lower loss.

== Applications ==
MoOCl_{2}'s low-loss, miniaturized polarization offers potential in photonic systems.
