= Molybdenum oxytetrafluoride =

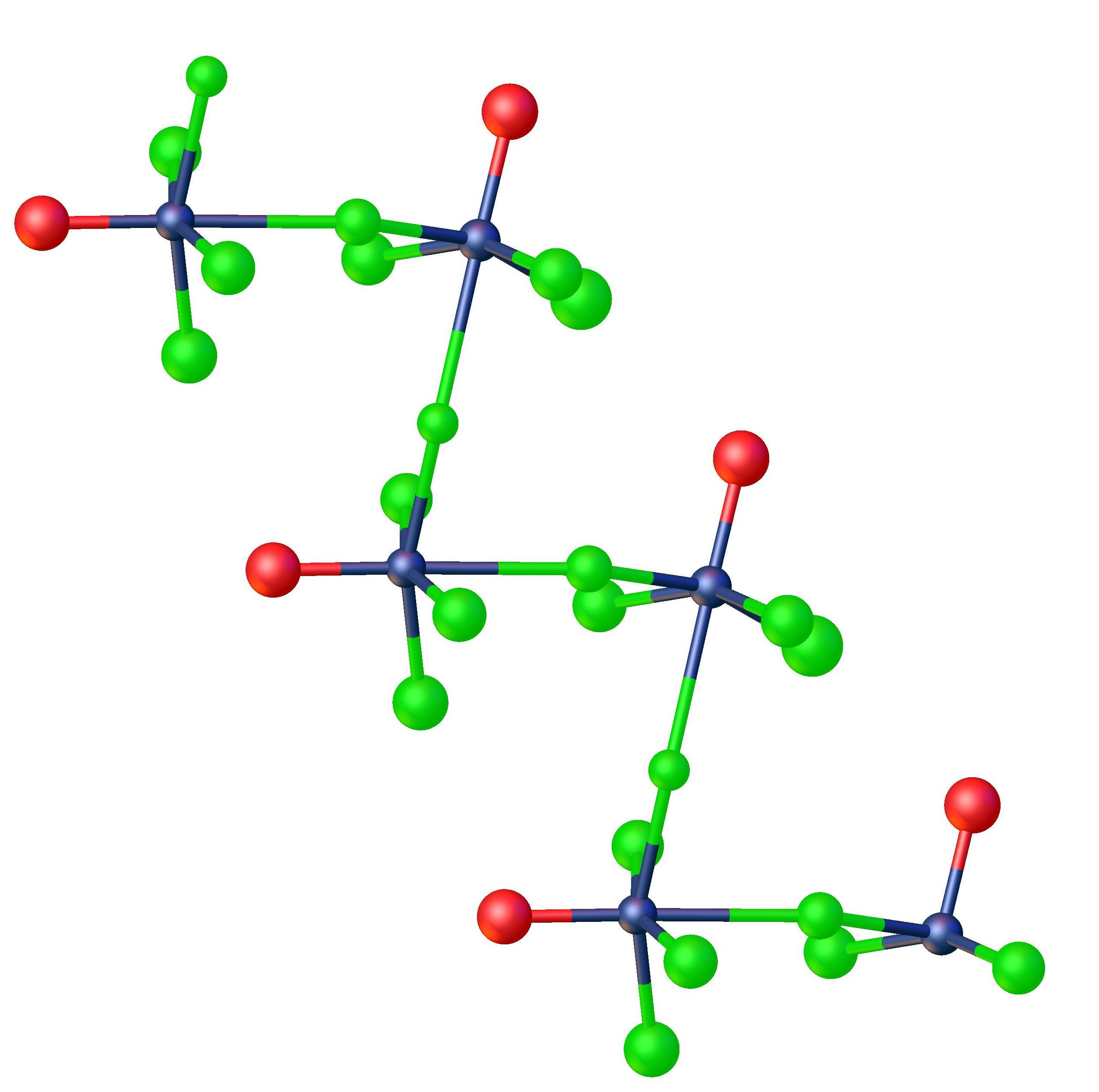

Names
- IUPAC name Molybdenum(VI) tetrafluoride oxide

Identifiers
CAS Number	14459-59-7
3D model (JSmol)	Interactive image
ChEBI	CHEBI:30716
ChemSpider	10329778
Gmelin Reference	101090, 555842
PubChem CID	139764
- InChI: InChI=1S/4FH.Mo.O/h4*1H;;/q;;;;+4;/p-4 Key: YNQWRUOYFUZKDU-UHFFFAOYSA-J
- SMILES: O=[Mo](F)(F)(F)F

Properties
Chemical formula	MoOF_{4}
Molar mass	187.94 g·mol^{−1}
Appearance	white solid
Density	3.3 g/cm^{3}

Related compounds
Other anions	Molybdenum oxytetrachloride
Other cations	Chromium oxytetrafluoride; Tungsten oxytetrafluoride
Related compounds	Molybdenum difluoride dioxide
- Except where otherwise noted, data are given for materials in their standard state (at 25 °C [77 °F], 100 kPa). Infobox references

Molybdenum oxytetrafluoride is the inorganic compound with the formula MoOF_{4}. It is a white, diamagnetic solid. According to X-ray crystallography, it is a coordination polymer consisting of a linear chain of alternating Mo and F atoms. Each Mo center is octahedral, the coordination sphere being defined by oxide, three terminal fluorides, and two bridging fluorides. In contrast to this motif, tungsten oxytetrafluoride crystallizes as a tetramer, again with bridging fluoride ligands.

== Reactions ==
The acetonitrile adduct of molybdenum oxytetrafluoride can be prepared by treating molybdenum hexafluoride with hexamethyldisiloxane in acetonitrile:

MoF_{6} + [(CH_{3})_{3}Si]_{2}O + CH_{3}CN → CH_{3}CN·MoOF_{4} + 2 (CH_{3})_{3}SiF

Molybdenum oxytetrafluoride is susceptible to hydrolysis to give molybdenum difluoride dioxide.
