= Rhenium trioxide =

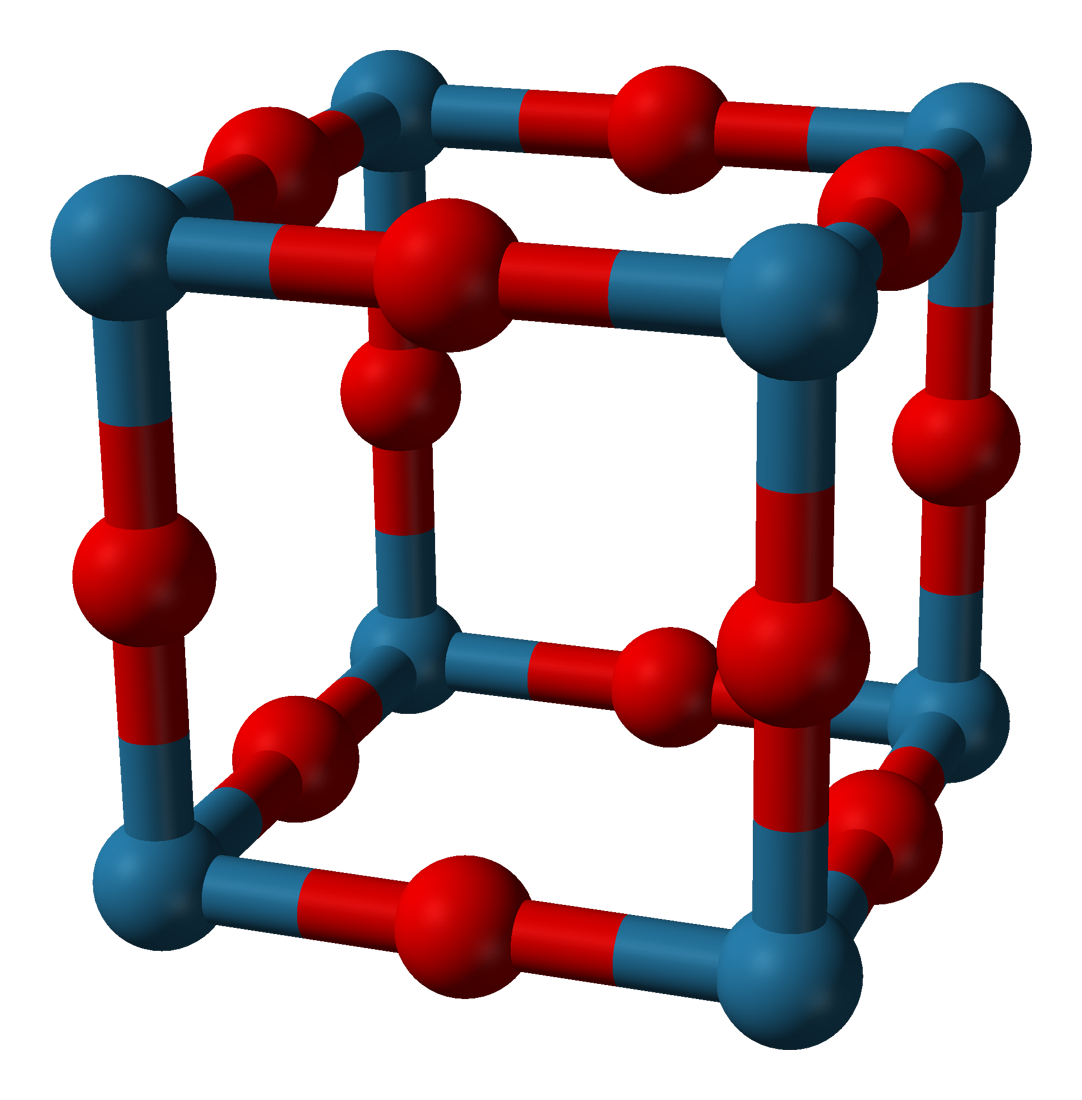

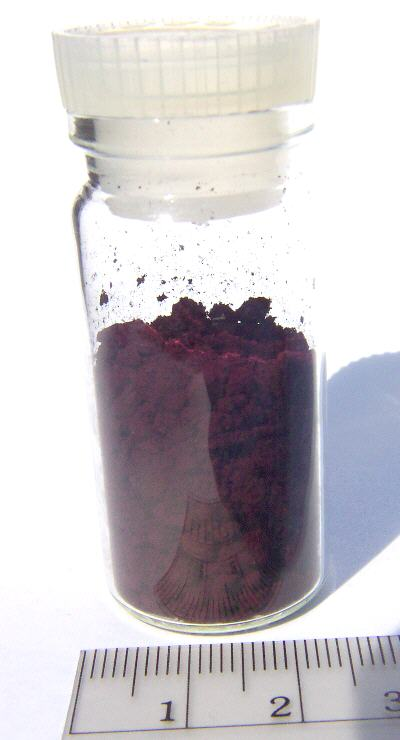

Names
- IUPAC name Rhenium trioxide
- Other names Rhenia

Identifiers
| CAS Number | 1314-28-9 |
| 3D model (JSmol) | Interactive image |
| ChemSpider | 92247 |
| ECHA InfoCard | 100.013.845 |
| EC Number | 215-228-8 |
| PubChem CID | 102110 |
| UNII | FET0Y2C413 |
| CompTox Dashboard (EPA) | DTXSID0061662 |
- InChI: Key: YSZJKUDBYALHQE-UHFFFAOYSA-N; InChI=1S/3O.Re
- SMILES: O=[Re](=O)=O

Properties
| Chemical formula | ReO_{3} |
| Molar mass | 234.205 g/mol |
| Appearance | Deep red crystals |
| Density | 6.92 g/cm^{3} |
| Melting point | 400 °C (752 °F; 673 K) (decomposes) |
| Magnetic susceptibility (χ) | +16.0·10^{−6} cm^{3}/mol |
| Refractive index (n_{D}) | 1.68 |

Structure
| Crystal structure | Cubic, cP4 |
| Space group | Pm3̅m, No. 221 |
| Lattice constant | a = 374.8 pm |
- Except where otherwise noted, data are given for materials in their standard state (at 25 °C [77 °F], 100 kPa). verify (what is ?) Infobox references

Rhenium trioxide or rhenium(VI) oxide is an inorganic compound with the formula ReO_{3}. It is a red solid with a metallic lustre that resembles copper in appearance. It is the only stable trioxide of the Group 7 elements (Mn, Tc, Re).

== Preparation and structure ==
Rhenium trioxide can be formed by reducing rhenium(VII) oxide with carbon monoxide at 200 °C or elemental rhenium at 400 °C.

Re_{2}O_{7} + CO → 2 ReO_{3} + CO_{2}
3 Re_{2}O_{7} + Re → 7 ReO_{3}

Re_{2}O_{7} can also be reduced with dioxane.

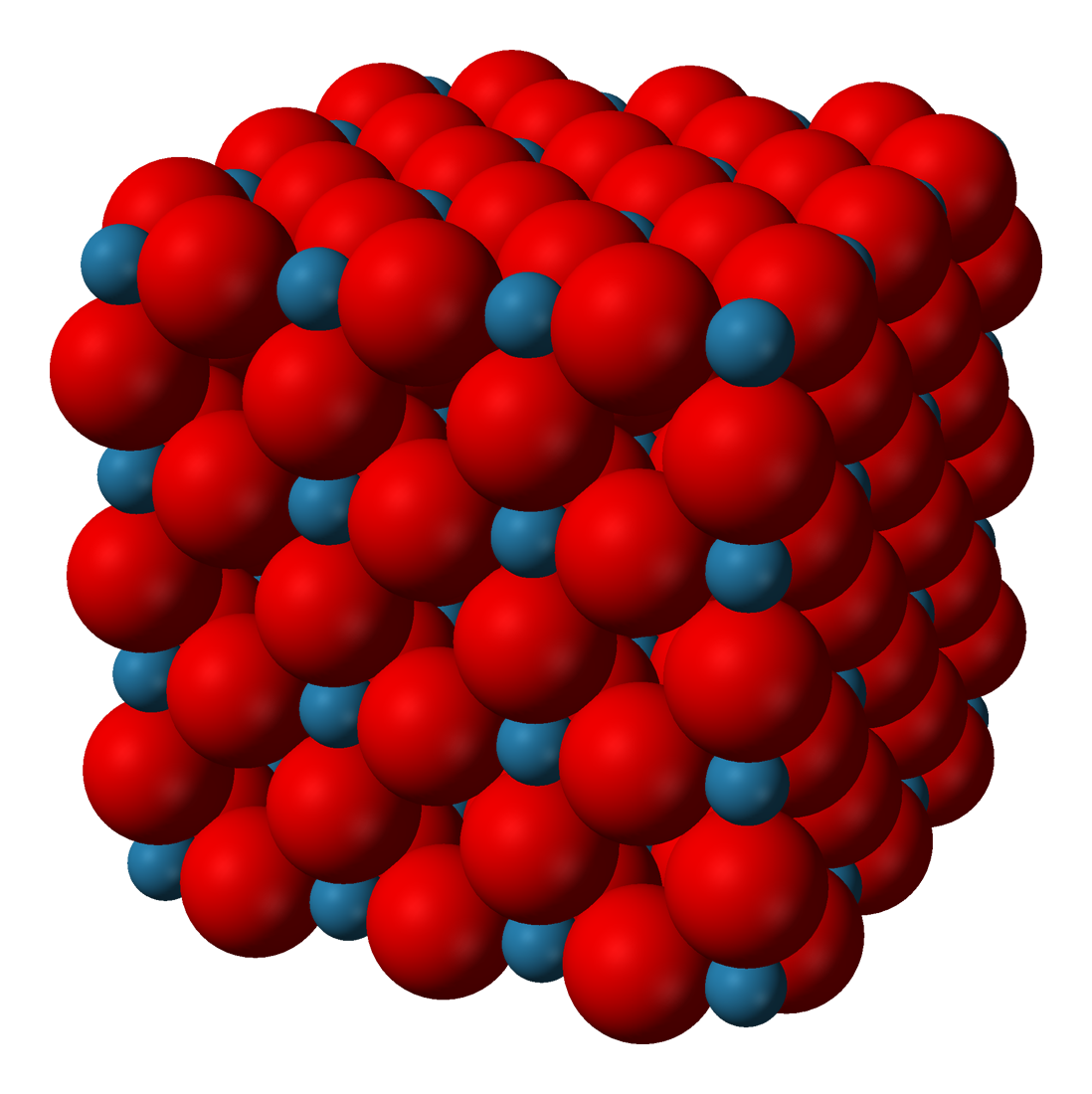
blue: Rhenium, red: Oxygen

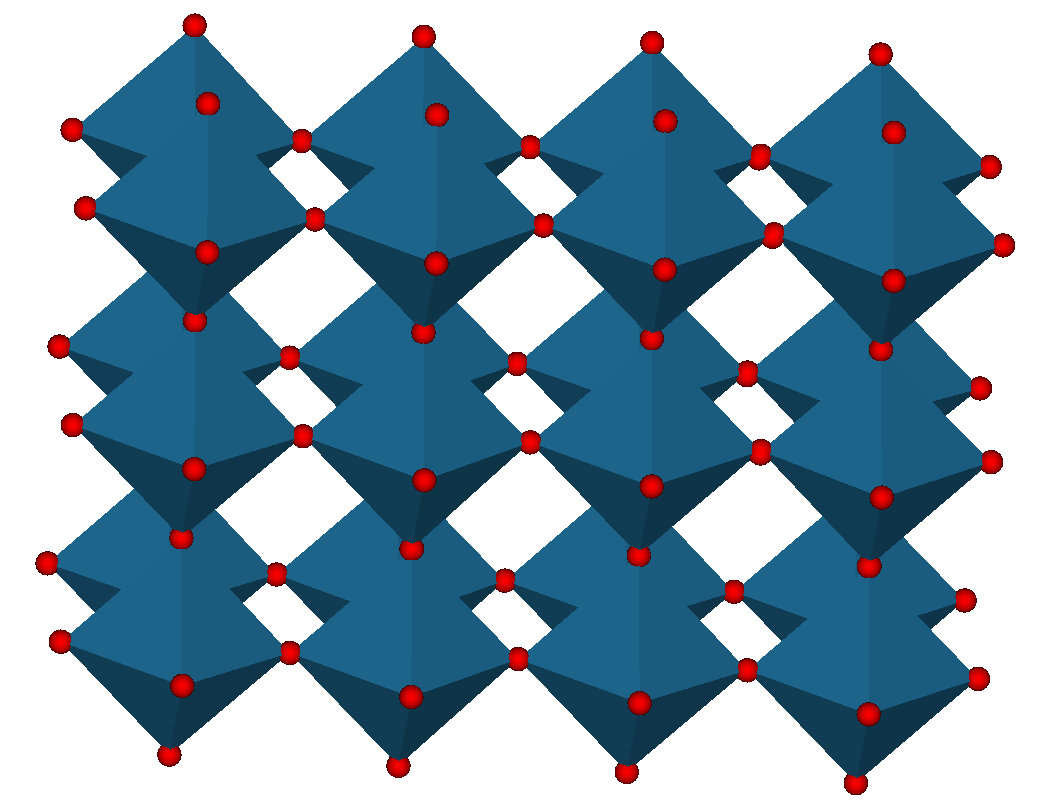
ReO_{3} polyhedra

Rhenium trioxide crystallizes with a primitive cubic unit cell, with a lattice parameter of 3.742 Å (374.2 pm). The structure of ReO_{3} is similar to that of perovskite (ABO_{3}), without the large A cation at the centre of the unit cell. Each rhenium center is surrounded by an octahedron defined by six oxygen centers. These octahedra share corners to form the 3-dimensional structure. The coordination number of O is 2, because each oxygen atom has 2 neighbouring Re atoms.

== Properties ==
=== Physical properties ===
ReO_{3} is unusual for an oxide because it exhibits very low resistivity. It behaves like a metal in that its resistivity decreases as its temperature decreases. At 300 K, its resistivity is 100.0 nΩ·m, whereas at 100 K, this decreases to 6.0 nΩ·m, 17 times less than at 300 K.

=== Chemical properties ===
Rhenium trioxide is insoluble in water, as well as dilute acids and bases. Heating it in base results in disproportionation to give ReO_{2} and ReO^{−}_{4}, while reaction with acid at high temperature affords Re_{2}O_{7}. In concentrated nitric acid, it yields perrhenic acid. Upon heating to 400 °C under vacuum, it undergoes disproportionation:

3 ReO_{3} → Re_{2}O_{7} + ReO_{2}

Rhenium trioxide can be chlorinated to give rhenium trioxide chloride:

2 ReO_{3} + Cl_{2} → 2 ReO_{3}Cl

Rhenium trioxide serves as host for the intercalation of one and two equivalents of lithium. Lithium can be incorporated using butyl lithium:

ReO_{3} + C_{4}H_{9}Li → LiReO_{3} + 0.5 C_{8}H_{18}
LiReO_{3} + C_{4}H_{9}Li → Li_{2}ReO_{3} + 0.5 C_{8}H_{18}

Re remains octahedral before and after intercalation, but the framework distorts.

== Uses ==
=== Hydrogenation catalyst ===
Rhenium trioxide finds some use in organic synthesis as a catalyst for amide reduction.
