= Rhenium trioxide chloride =

Names
- Other names Rhenium oxychloride

Identifiers
CAS Number	42246-25-3
3D model (JSmol)	Interactive image
UNII	PV3R74W1J5
- InChI: InChI=1S/ClH.3O.Re/h1H;;;;/q;;;;+1/p-1 Key: YDGWOHYNESLUAQ-UHFFFAOYSA-M
- SMILES: O=[Re](=O)(=O)Cl

Properties
Chemical formula	ClO_{3}Re
Molar mass	269.65 g·mol^{−1}
Appearance	colorless liquid
Density	4.665 g/cm^{3} (-100 °C)
Melting point	4.5 °C (40.1 °F; 277.6 K)
Boiling point	113 °C (235 °F; 386 K)

Related compounds
Related compounds	Rhenium oxytetrachloride
- Except where otherwise noted, data are given for materials in their standard state (at 25 °C [77 °F], 100 kPa). Infobox references

Rhenium trioxide chloride is an inorganic compound with the formula ReO_{3}Cl. It is a colorless, distillable, diamagnetic liquid. It is a rhenium oxychloride. The material is used as a reagent in the preparation of rhenium compounds.

== Synthesis and reactions ==
Rhenium trioxide chloride can be prepared by chlorination of rhenium trioxide:

2 ReO_{3} + Cl_{2} → 2 ReO_{3}Cl

With Lewis bases (L), rhenium trioxide chloride reacts to form adducts with the formula ReO_{3}ClL_{2}.

The compound hydrolyzes readily to give perrhenic acid.

== Structure ==
The compound adopts a tetrahedral structure with Re-O and Re-Cl bond distances of 1.71 and 2.22 Å. In contrast rhenium trioxide fluoride (ReO_{3}F) is polymeric with octahedral Re centers.
