= Molybdenum oxytetrachloride =

Molybdenum(VI) oxytetrachloride
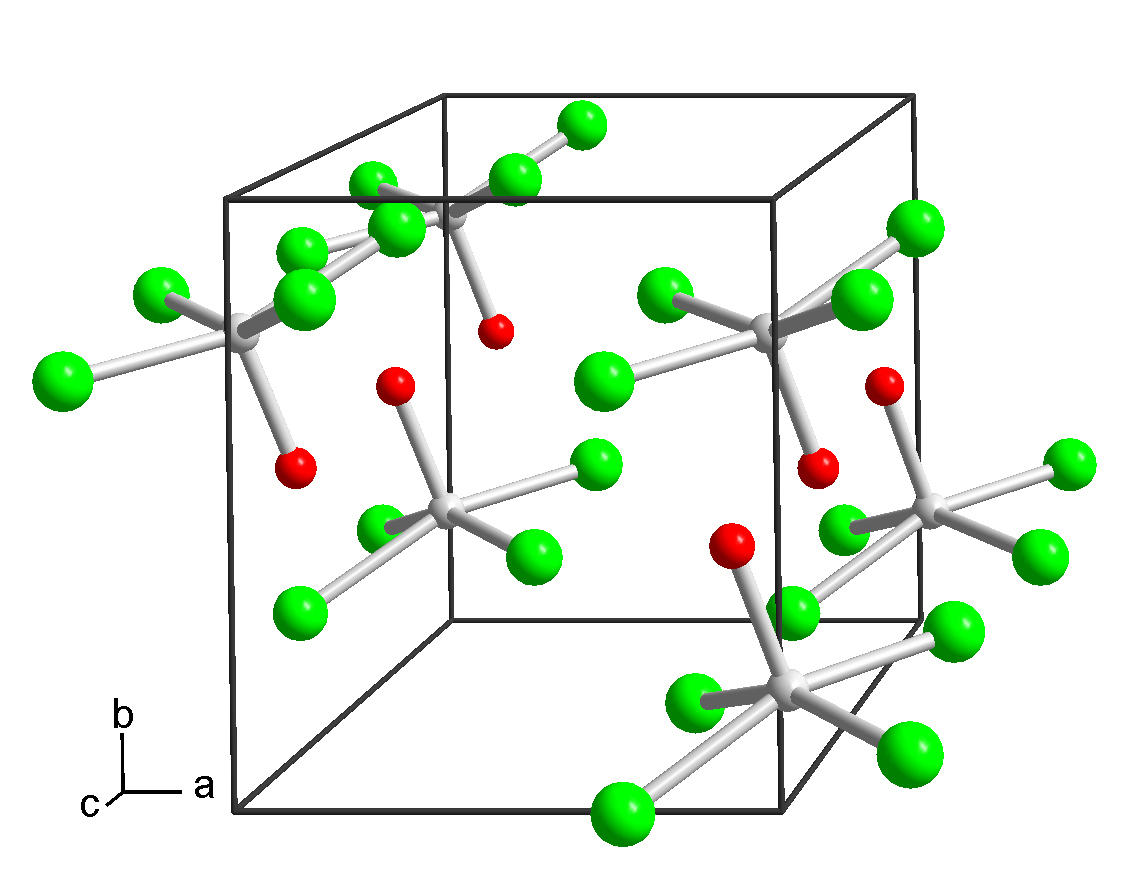

Identifiers
CAS Number	13814-75-0
3D model (JSmol)	Interactive image
ChEBI	CHEBI:30698
ChemSpider	19060258
ECHA InfoCard	100.156.445
EC Number	628-149-2
PubChem CID	4084870 (formula error)
CompTox Dashboard (EPA)	DTXSID501298196
- InChI: Key: RZTVLEJRRUSZLR-UHFFFAOYSA-J; InChI=1S/4ClH.Mo.O/h4*1H;;/q;;;;+6;-2/p-4
- SMILES: [O-2].[Cl-].[Cl-].[Cl-].[Cl-].[Mo+6]

Properties
Chemical formula	MoOCl_{4}
Molar mass	253.75 g·mol^{−1}
Appearance	dark green solid
Melting point	100–101 °C (212–214 °F; 373–374 K)
Solubility in water	reacts
Solubility	soluble in benzene and CS_{2}

Hazards
- GHS labelling
Pictograms	(GHS05: Corrosive)
Signal word	Danger
Hazard statements	H314
Precautionary statements	P260, P264, P280, P301+P330+P331, P303+P361+P353, P304+P340, P305+P351+P338, P310, P321, P363, P405, P501

Related compounds
Other anions	Molybdenum oxytetrafluoride
Other cations	Tungsten oxytetrachloride
Related compounds	Molybdenum dichloride dioxide
- Except where otherwise noted, data are given for materials in their standard state (at 25 °C [77 °F], 100 kPa). Infobox references

Molybdenum oxytetrachloride is the inorganic compound with the formula MoOCl_{4}. This thermally unstable, dark green solid is used to prepare other complexes of molybdenum. Its molecule adopts a square pyramidal molecular geometry of C_{4v} symmetry. As for other Mo(VI) compounds, it is diamagnetic. It decomposes thermally to MoOCl_{3}.

== Preparation ==
It is prepared by treating molybdenum pentachloride with oxygen. It also arises by chlorination of molybdenum trioxide:

MoO_{3} + 2 SOCl_{2} → MoOCl_{4} + 2 SO_{2}

== See also ==
- Molybdenum dichloride dioxide
- Molybdenum oxydichloride
