= Molybdenum difluoride dioxide =

Names
- Other names molybdenum dioxide difluoride

Identifiers
CAS Number	13824-57-2
3D model (JSmol)	Interactive image
- InChI: InChI=1S/2FH.Mo.2O/h2*1H;;;/q;;+2;;/p-2 Key: RMUNMMZEBAMTER-UHFFFAOYSA-L
- SMILES: O=[Mo](F)(F)=O

Properties
Chemical formula	MoF_{2}O_{2}
Molar mass	165.94 g·mol^{−1}
Appearance	white solid
Density	3.82 g/cm^{3}
- Except where otherwise noted, data are given for materials in their standard state (at 25 °C [77 °F], 100 kPa). Infobox references

Molybdenum difluoride dioxide is the inorganic compound with the formula MoF_{2}O_{2}. It is a white, diamagnetic, volatile solid.

== Structure ==
Structure of solid MoF_{2}O_{2}. X positions are occupied by O or F.

Gaseous molybdenum difluoride dioxide is a tetrahedral molecule. According to X-ray crystallography, the solid is a coordination polymer consisting of trigonal primatic chains of made by linking Mo_{3}F_{6}O_{6} monomers. The fluoride and oxide positions are disordered. A similar motif is adopted by titanium tetrafluoride.

== Synthesis and reactions ==
The compound can be obtained by thermal decomposition of the sodium tetrafluorodioxomolybdate(VI) Na_{2}[MoO_{2}F_{4}], which in turn is obtained from sodium molybdate:

Na_{2}MoO_{4} + 4 HF → Na_{2}[MoO_{2}F_{4}] + 2 H_{2}O

Heating sodium tetrafluorodioxomolybdate(VI) to 400 °C gives monomeric molybdenum difluoride dioxide, which polymerizes upon condensation:

Na_{2}[MoO_{2}F_{4}] → 2 NaF + MoO_{2}F_{2}

The compound also arises by hydrolysis of molybdenum oxytetrafluoride:

MoOF_{4} + H_{2}O → 2 HF + MoO_{2}F_{2}

The compound dissolves in dimethylformamide to give a adduct molybdenum difluoride dioxide bis(dimethylformamide):

MoO_{2}F_{2} + 2 HC(=O)−N(CH_{3})_{2} → MoO_{2}F_{2}(HC(=O)−N(CH_{3})_{2})_{2}
