= Solubility table =

Variation of solubility of assorted substances

The tables below provides information on the variation of solubility of different substances (mostly inorganic compounds) in water with temperature, at one atmosphere pressure. Units of solubility are given in grams of substance per 100 millilitres of water (g/100 ml), unless shown otherwise. The substances are listed in Latin alphabetical order.

== Tables ==
=== A ===
Solubility tables
Substance	Formula	0 °C	10 °C	15 °C	20 °C	30 °C	40 °C	50 °C	60 °C	70 °C	80 °C	90 °C	100 °C
Actinium(III) hydroxide	Ac(OH)_{3}				0.0021								
Aluminium chloride	AlCl_{3}	43.9	44.9		45.8	46.6	47.3		48.1		48.6		49.0
Aluminium fluoride	AlF_{3}	0.57	0.56		0.67	0.78	0.91		1.1		1.32		1.72
Aluminium hydroxide	Al(OH)_{3}				2.262×10^{−8}								
Aluminium nitrate	Al(NO_{3})_{3}	60	66.7		73.9	81.8	88.7	96.0	106	120	132	153	160
Aluminium perchlorate	Al(ClO_{4})_{3}	122	128		133								
Aluminium sulfate	Al_{2}(SO_{4})_{3}	31.2	33.5		36.4	40.4	45.8	52.2	59.2	66.2	73	80.8	89.0
Ammonia (ml/l)	NH_{3}	1176	900		702	565	428	333	252	188	138	100	88
Ammonium acetate	NH_{4}C_{2}H_{3}O_{2}	102			143		204		311		533		
Ammonium azide	NH_{4}N_{3}	16			25.3		37.1						
Ammonium benzoate	NH_{4}C_{7}H_{5}O_{2}		19.6		21.3								83
Ammonium bicarbonate	NH_{4}HCO_{3}	11.9	16.1		21.7	28.4	36.6		59.2		109	dec	
Ammonium bromide	NH_{4}Br	60.6	68.1		76.4	83.2	91.2	99.2	108	117	125	135	145
Ammonium carbonate monohydrate	(NH_{4})_{2}CO_{3}·H_{2}O	55.8			100				dec				
Ammonium chlorate	NH_{4}ClO_{3}				28.7								
Ammonium chloride	NH_{4}Cl	29.4	33.2		37.2	41.4	45.8	50.4	55.3	60.2	65.6	71.2	77.3
Ammonium hexachloroplatinate	(NH_{4})_{2}PtCl_{6}	0.289	0.374		0.499	0.637	0.815		1.44		2.16	2.61	3.36
Ammonium chromate	(NH_{4})_{2}CrO_{4}	25	29.2		34	39.3	45.3	51.9	59.0	71.2	76.1		
Ammonium dichromate	(NH_{4})_{2}Cr_{2}O_{7}	18.2	25.5		35.6	46.5	58.5	71.4	86.0		115		156
Ammonium dihydrogen arsenate	NH_{4}H_{2}AsO_{4}	33.7			48.7		63.8		83		107	122	
Ammonium dihydrogen phosphate	NH_{4}H_{2}PO_{4}	22.7	29.5		37.4	46.4	56.7	69.0	82.5	98.6	118.3	142.8	173.2
Ammonium fluoride	NH_{4}F	71.5	76.1		80.8	86.2	91.57	97.2	103.7	110.5	117.9		
Ammonium fluorosilicate	(NH_{4})_{2}SiF_{6}	12.28	16.41		18.6	25.0	31.6	35.4	40.4	44.9	48.1(75 °C)		61.0
Ammonium formate	NH_{4}HCO_{2}	102			143		204		311		533		
Ammonium hydrogen phosphate	(NH_{4})_{2}HPO_{4}	42.9	62.9		68.9	75.1	81.8	89.2	97.2	106	110	112	121
Ammonium hydrogen sulfate	NH_{4}HSO_{4}				100								
Ammonium hydrogen tartrate	NH_{4}HC_{4}H_{4}O_{6}		1.88		2.7								
Ammonium iodate	NH_{4}IO_{3}			2.6									14.5
Ammonium iodide	NH_{4}I	155	163		172	182	191	200	209	219	229		250
Ammonium nitrate	NH_{4}NO_{3}	118	150		192	242	297	344	421	499	580	740	871
Ammonium orthoperiodate	(NH_{4})_{5}IO_{6}				2.7								
Ammonium oxalate	(NH_{4})_{2}C_{2}O_{4}	2.2	3.21		4.45	6.09	8.18	10.3	14.0		22.4	27.9	34.7
Ammonium perchlorate	NH_{4}ClO_{4}	11.56	16.4		20.85		30.58		39.05		48.19		57.01
Ammonium permanganate	NH_{4}MnO_{4}			8.0					dec				
Ammonium perrhenate	NH_{4}ReO_{4}	2.8			6.2		12.0		20.7		32.3	39.1	
Ammonium phosphate	(NH_{4})_{3}PO_{4}	9.40			20.3			37.7					
Ammonium selenate	(NH_{4})_{2}SeO_{4}	96	105		115	126	143		192				
Ammonium sulfate	(NH_{4})_{2}SO_{4}	70.6	73		75.4	78.1	81.2	84.3	87.4		94.1		103
Ammonium aluminium sulfate dodecahydrate	NH_{4}Al(SO_{4})_{2}·12H_{2}O	2.4	5.0		7.4	10.5	14.6	19.6	26.7	37.7	53.9	98.2	121
Ammonium sulfite	(NH_{4})_{2}SO_{3}	47.9	54		60.8	68.8	78.4		104		144	150	153
Ammonium tartrate	(NH_{4})_{2}C_{4}H_{4}O_{6}	45	55		63	70.5	76.5		86.9				
Ammonium thiocyanate	NH_{4}SCN	120	144		170	208	234	235	346				
Ammonium thiosulfate	(NH_{4})_{2}S_{2}O_{3}				173		205				269		
Ammonium vanadate	NH_{4}VO_{3}				0.48	0.84	1.32	1.78	2.42	3.05			7.0
Aniline	C_{6}H_{7}N				3.6								
Antimony trifluoride	SbF_{3}	385			444	562	dec						
Antimony sulfide	Sb_{2}S_{3}				1.8×10^{−4}								
Antimony trichloride	SbCl_{3}	602			910	1090	1370	1917	4531	dec			
Argon (Unit:ml/ml)	Ar	0.056	0.0405		0.0336	0.0288	0.0252	0.0223					
Arsenic pentasulfide	As_{2}S_{5}	0.0014											
Arsenic pentoxide	As_{2}O_{5}	59.5	62.1		65.8	70.6	71.2		73.0		75.1		76.7
Arsenious sulfide	As_{2}S_{3}				0.0004								
Arsenic trioxide	As_{2}O_{3}	1.21	1.58		1.80		2.93	3.43	4.44	5.37	5.89	6.55	9
Arsine (Unit:ml/ml)	AsH_{3}				0.2								

=== B ===
Substance	Formula	0 °C	10 °C	20 °C	30 °C	40 °C	50 °C	60 °C	70 °C	80 °C	90 °C	100 °C
Barium acetate	Ba(C_{2}H_{3}O_{2})_{2}	58.8	62	72	75	78.5	77	75	74	74		
Barium arsenate	Ba_{3}(AsO_{4})_{2}			2.586×10^{−9}								
Barium azide	Ba(N_{3})_{2}	12.5	16.1	17.4					24.75			
Barium bromate monohydrate	Ba(BrO_{3})_{2}·H_{2}O	0.29	0.44	0.65	0.95	1.31	1.75	2.27	3.01	3.65	4.45	5.71
Barium bromide	BaBr_{2}	98	101	104	109	114		123		135		149
Barium carbonate	BaCO_{3}			2.4×10^{−3}								
Barium chlorate	Ba(ClO_{3})_{2}	20.3	26.9	33.9	41.6	49.7		66.7		84.8		105
Barium chloride	BaCl_{2}	31.2	33.5	35.8	38.1	40.8		46.2		52.5	55.8	59.4
Barium chlorite	Ba(ClO_{2})_{2}	43.9	44.6	45.4		47.9		53.8		66.6		80.8
Barium chromate	BaCrO_{4}			2.775×10^{−4}								
Barium cyanide	Ba(CN)_{2}			80								
Barium ferrocyanide	Ba_{2}Fe(CN)_{6}			0.009732								
Barium fluoride	BaF_{2}		0.159	0.16	0.161							
Barium fluorosilicate	BaSiF_{6}			0.028								
Barium formate	Ba(HCO_{2})_{2}	26.2	28	31.9	34		38.6		44.2	47.6	51.3	
Barium hydrogen phosphate	BaHPO_{4}			0.013								
Barium hydrogen phosphite	BaHPO_{3}			0.687								
Barium hydroxide octahydrate	Ba(OH)_{2}·8H_{2}O	1.67	2.48	3.89	5.59	8.22	11.7	20.9		101		
Barium iodate	Ba(IO_{3})_{2}			0.035	0.046	0.057						0.2
Barium iodide	BaI_{2}	182	201	223	250			264			291	301
Barium molybdate	BaMoO_{4}			0.006								
Barium nitrate	Ba(NO_{3})_{2}	4.95	6.77	9.02	11.5	14.1		20.4		27.2		34.4
Barium nitrite	Ba(NO_{2})_{2}	50.3	60	72.8		102		151		222	261	325
Barium oxalate dihydrate	BaC_{2}O_{4}·2H_{2}O			0.003								
Barium oxide	BaO			3.48							90.8	
Barium perchlorate	Ba(ClO_{4})_{2}	239		336		416		495		575		653
Barium permanganate	Ba(MnO_{4})_{2}		62.5									
Barium manganate	BaMnO_{4}			0.0036								
Barium pyrophosphate	Ba_{2}P_{2}O_{7}			0.009								
Barium selenate	BaSeO_{4}			0.005								
Barium sulfate	BaSO_{4}			2.448×10^{−4}	2.85×10^{−4}							
Beryllium carbonate	BeCO_{3}			0.218								
Beryllium chloride	BeCl_{2}		42	42								
Beryllium molybdate	BeMoO_{4}			3.02								
Beryllium nitrate	Be(NO_{3})_{2}	97	102	108	113	125		178				
Beryllium oxalate trihydrate	BeC_{2}O_{4}·3H_{2}O			63.5								
Beryllium perchlorate	Be(ClO_{4})_{2}			147								
Beryllium selenate tetrahydrate	BeSeO_{4}·4H_{2}O			49								
Beryllium sulfate tetrahydrate	BeSO_{4}·4H_{2}O	37	37.6	39.1	41.4	45.8		53.1		67.2		82.8
Bismuth arsenate	BiAsO_{4}			7.298×10^{−4}								
Bismuth hydroxide	Bi(OH)_{3}			2.868×10^{−7}								
Bismuth iodide	BiI_{3}			7.761×10^{−4}								
Bismuth phosphate	BiPO_{4}			1.096×10^{−10}								
Bismuth sulfide	Bi_{2}S_{3}			1.561×10^{−20}								
Boric acid	H_{3}BO_{3}	2.59	3.62	4.95	6.64	8.79	11.45	14.90	18.69	23.61	30.33	37.99
Boron trioxide	B_{2}O_{3}			2.2								
Bromine monochloride	BrCl			1.5								

=== C ===
Substance	Formula	0 °C	10 °C	20 °C	30 °C	40 °C	50 °C	60 °C	70 °C	80 °C	90 °C	100 °C
Cadmium arsenate	Cd_{3}(AsO_{4})_{2}			7.091×10^{−6}								
Cadmium benzoate	Cd(C_{7}H_{5}O_{2})_{2}			2.81								
Cadmium bromate	Cd(BrO_{3})_{2}			125								
Cadmium bromide	CdBr_{2}	56.3	75.4	98.8	129	152		153		156		160
Cadmium carbonate	CdCO_{3}			3.932×10^{−5}								
Cadmium chlorate	Cd(ClO_{3})_{2}	299	308	322	348	376		455				
Cadmium chloride	CdCl_{2}	100	135	135	135	135		136		140		147
Cadmium cyanide	Cd(CN)_{2}			0.022								
Cadmium ferrocyanide	Cd_{2}Fe(CN)_{6}			8.736×10^{−5}								
Cadmium fluoride	CdF_{2}			4								
Cadmium formate	Cd(HCO_{2})_{2}	8.3	11.1	14.4	18.6	25.3		59.5		80.5	85.2	94.6
Cadmium hydroxide	Cd(OH)_{2}			2.697×10^{−4}								
Cadmium iodate	Cd(IO_{3})_{2}			0.097								
Cadmium iodide	CdI_{2}	78.7		84.7	87.9	92.1		100		111		125
Cadmium nitrate	Cd(NO_{3})_{2}	122		136	150	194		310		713		
Cadmium oxalate	CdC_{2}O_{4}·3H_{2}O			0.006046								
Cadmium perchlorate	Cd(ClO_{4})_{2}		180	188	195	203		221		243		272
Cadmium phosphate	Cd_{3}(PO_{4})_{2}			6.235×10^{−6}								
Cadmium selenate	CdSeO_{4}	72.5	68.4	64	58.9	55		44.2		32.5	27.2	22
Cadmium sulfate	CdSO_{4}	75.4	76	76.6		78.5		81.8		66.7	63.1	60.8
Cadmium sulfide	CdS			1.292×10^{−12}								
Cadmium tungstate	CdWO_{4}			0.04642								
Caesium acetate	CsC_{2}H_{3}O_{2}			1010							1345.5	
Caesium azide	CsN_{3}			307								
Caesium bromate	CsBrO_{3}	2.10		3.66	4.53	5.3						
Caesium bromide	CsBr			108								
Caesium chlorate	CsClO_{3}		3.8	6.2	9.5	13.8		26.2		45	58	79
Caesium chloride	CsCl	146	175	187	197	208		230		250	260	271
Caesium chromate	Cs_{2}CrO_{4}		71.4									
Caesium fluoride	CsF			322								
Caesium fluoroborate	CsBF_{4}			0.818								
Caesium formate	CsHCO_{2}	335	381	450	694							
Caesium iodate	CsIO_{3}			2.6								
Caesium iodide	CsI	44.1	58.5	76.5	96	124		150		190	205	
Caesium nitrate	CsNO_{3}	9.33	14.9	23	33.9	47.2		83.8		134	163	197
Caesium oxalate	Cs_{2}C_{2}O_{4}			313								
Caesium perchlorate	CsClO_{4}	0.8	1	1.6	2.6	4		7.3		14.4	20.5	30
Caesium permanganate	CsMnO_{4}			0.228								
Caesium phosphate	Cs_{3}PO_{4}			340								
Caesium selenate	Cs_{2}SeO_{4}		244									
Caesium sulfate	Cs_{2}SO_{4}	167	173	179	184	190		200		210	215	200
Calcium acetate	Ca(C_{2}H_{3}O_{2})_{2}	37.4	36	34.7	33.8	33.2		32.7		33.5	31.1	29.7
Calcium arsenate	Ca_{3}(AsO_{4})_{2}			0.003629								
Calcium azide	Ca(N_{3})_{2}			45								
Calcium benzoate	Ca(C_{7}H_{5}O_{2})_{2}·3H_{2}O	2.32	2.45	2.72	3.02	3.42		4.71		6.87	8.55	8.7
Calcium bicarbonate	Ca(HCO_{3})_{2}	16.1		16.6		17.1		17.5		17.9		18.4
Calcium bromate	Ca(BrO_{3})_{2}			230								
Calcium bromide	CaBr_{2}	125	132	143		213		278		295		312
Calcium carbonate (Aragonite)	CaCO_{3}-Aragonite			7.753×10^{−4}								
Calcium carbonate (Calcite)	CaCO_{3}-Calcite			6.17×10^{−4}								
Calcium chlorate	Ca(ClO_{3})_{2}			209								
Calcium chloride	CaCl_{2}	59.5	64.7	74.5	100	128		137		147	154	159
Calcium chromate	CaCrO_{4}	4.5		2.25	1.83	1.49		0.83				
Calcium citrate	Ca_{3}(C_{6}H_{5}O_{7})_{2}			0.095 (25 °C)								
Monocalcium phosphate	Ca(H_{2}PO_{4})_{2}			1.8								
Calcium fluoride	CaF_{2}	0.008575										
Calcium fluorosilicate	CaSiF_{6}			0.518								
Calcium formate	Ca(HCO_{2})_{2}	16.1		16.6		17.1		17.5		17.9		18.4
Dicalcium phosphate	CaHPO_{4}			0.004303								
Calcium hydroxide	Ca(OH)_{2}	0.189	0.182	0.173	0.16	0.141		0.121		0.086	0.076	0.068
Calcium iodate	Ca(IO_{3})_{2}	0.09		0.24	0.38	0.52		0.65		0.66	0.67	0.67
Calcium iodide	CaI_{2}	64.6		66	67.6	70.8		74		78		81
Calcium molybdate	CaMoO_{4}			0.004099								
Calcium nitrate	Ca(NO_{3})_{2}			121.2								
Calcium nitrate	Ca(NO_{3})_{2}·4H_{2}O	102	115	129	152	191				358		363
Calcium nitrite	Ca(NO_{2})_{2}·4H_{2}O	63.9		84.5	104			134		151	166	178
Calcium oxalate	CaC_{2}O_{4}			6.7×10^{−4}							0.0014	
Calcium oxide	CaO											5.7
Calcium perchlorate	Ca(ClO_{4})_{2}			188								
Calcium permanganate	Ca(MnO_{4})_{2}			338								
Calcium phosphate	Ca_{3}(PO_{4})_{2}			0.002								
Calcium selenate	CaSeO_{4}·2H_{2}O	9.73	9.77	9.22	8.79	7.14						
Calcium sulfate	CaSO_{4}·2H_{2}O	0.223	0.244	0.255	0.264	0.265		0.244		0.234		0.205
Calcium tungstate	CaWO_{4}			0.002387								
Carbon dioxide	CO_{2}			0.1782								
Carbon monoxide	CO			0.0026								
Cerium(III) acetate	Ce(C_{2}H_{3}O_{2})_{3}			0.35								
Cerium(III) chloride	CeCl_{3}			100								
Cerium(III) hydroxide	Ce(OH)_{3}			9.43×10^{−5}								
Cerium(III) iodate	Ce(IO_{3})_{3}			0.123								
Cerium(III) nitrate	Ce(NO_{3})_{3}			234								
Cerium(III) phosphate	CePO_{4}			7.434×10^{−11}								
Cerium(III) selenate	Ce_{2}(SeO_{4})_{3}	39.5	37.2	35.2	33.2	32.6		13.7		4.6		
Cerium(III) sulfate	Ce_{2}(SO_{4})_{3}·2H_{2}O	21.4		9.84	7.24	5.63		3.87				
Cerium(IV) hydroxide	Ce(OH)_{4}			1.981×10^{−5}								
Chromium(III) nitrate	Cr(NO_{3})_{3}	108	124	130	152							
Chromium(III) perchlorate	Cr(ClO_{4})_{3}	104	123	130								
Chromium(III) sulfate	Cr_{2}(SO_{4})_{3}·18H_{2}O			220								
Chromium(VI) oxide	CrO_{3}	61.7		63							67	
Citric acid	C_{6}H_{8}O_{7}		54	59.2	64.3	68.6	70.9	73.5	76.2	78.8	81.4	84
Cobalt(II) bromate	Co(BrO_{3})_{2}·6H_{2}O			45.5								
Cobalt(II) bromide	CoBr_{2}	91.9		112	128	163		227		241		257
Cobalt(II) chlorate	Co(ClO_{3})_{2}	135	162	180	195	214		316				
Cobalt(II) chloride	CoCl_{2}	43.5	47.7	52.9	59.7	69.5		93.8		97.6	101	106
Cobalt(II) fluoride	CoF_{2}			1.36								
Cobalt(II) fluorosilicate	CoSiF_{6}·6H_{2}O			118								
Cobalt(II) iodate	Co(IO_{3})_{2}·2H_{2}O			1.02	0.9	0.88		0.82		0.73		0.7
Cobalt(II) iodide	CoI_{2}			203								
Cobalt(II) nitrate	Co(NO_{3})_{2}	84	89.6	97.4	111	125		174		204	300	
Cobalt(II) nitrite	Co(NO_{2})_{2}	0.076	0.24	0.4	0.61	0.85						
Cobalt oxalate	CoC_{2}O_{4}·2H_{2}O			2.6972×10^{−9}								
Cobalt(II) perchlorate	Co(ClO_{4})_{2}			104								
Cobalt(II) sulfate	CoSO_{4}	25.5	30.5	36.1	42	48.8		55		53.8	45.3	38.9
Copper(I) chloride	CuCl			0.0099								
Copper(I) cyanide	CuCN			1.602×10^{−9}								
Copper(I) hydroxide	CuOH			8.055×10^{−7}								
Copper(I) iodide	CuI			0.0042								
Copper(I) sulfide	Cu_{2}S			1.361×10^{−15}								
Copper(I) thiocyanate	CuSCN			8.427×10^{−7}								
Copper(II) bromide	CuBr_{2}	107	116	126	128	131						
Copper(II) carbonate	CuCO_{3}			1.462×10^{−4}								
Copper(II) chlorate	Cu(ClO_{3})_{2}			242								
Copper(II) chloride	CuCl_{2}	68.6	70.9	73	77.3	87.6		96.5		104	108	120
Copper(II) chromate	CuCrO_{4}			0.03407								
Copper(II) fluoride	CuF_{2}			0.075								
Copper(II) fluorosilicate	CuSiF_{6}	73.5	76.5	81.6	84.1	91.2				93.2		
Copper(II) formate	Cu(HCO_{2})_{2}			12.5								
Copper(II) hydroxide	Cu(OH)_{2}			1.722×10^{−6}								
Copper(II) iodate	Cu(IO_{3})_{2}·2H_{2}O			0.109								
Copper(II) nitrate	Cu(NO_{3})_{2}	83.5	100	125	156	163		182		208	222	247
Copper oxalate	CuC_{2}O_{4}·2H_{2}O			2.1627×10^{−10}								
Copper(II) perchlorate	Cu(ClO_{4})_{2}				146							
Copper(II) selenate	CuSeO_{4}	12	14.5	17.5	21	25.2		36.5		53.7		
Copper(II) selenite	CuSeO_{3}			0.002761								
Copper(II) sulfate	CuSO_{4}·5H_{2}O	23.1	27.5	32	37.8	44.6		61.8		83.8		114
Copper(II) sulfide	CuS			2.41×10^{−17}								

=== D and E ===
Substance	Formula	0 °C	10 °C	20 °C	30 °C	40 °C	50 °C	60 °C	70 °C	80 °C	90 °C	100 °C
Dysprosium(III) chromate	Dy_{2}(CrO_{4})_{3}·10H_{2}O			0.663								
Dysprosium(III) sulfate	Dy_{2}(SO_{4})_{3}·8H_{2}O			4.83								
Erbium(III) hydroxide	Er(OH)_{3}			1.363×10^{−5}								
Erbium(III) sulfate	Er_{2}(SO_{4})_{3}			13.79								
Erbium(III) sulfate	Er_{2}(SO_{4})_{3}·8H_{2}O			16.00		6.53						
Europium(III) hydroxide	Eu(OH)_{3}			1.538×10^{−5}								
Europium(III) sulfate	Eu_{2}(SO_{4})_{3}·8H_{2}O			2.56								

=== F and G ===
Substance	Formula	0 °C	10 °C	20 °C	30 °C	40 °C	50 °C	60 °C	70 °C	80 °C	90 °C	100 °C
Ferrous ammonium sulfate	(NH_{4})_{2}Fe(SO_{4})_{2}·6H_{2}O			26.9						73		
Fructose	C_{6}H_{12}O_{6}			375.0		538.0						
Gadolinium(III) acetate	Gd(C_{2}H_{3}O_{2})_{3}·4H_{2}O			11.6								
Gadolinium(III) bicarbonate	Gd(HCO_{3})_{3}			5.61								
Gadolinium(III) bromate	Gd(BrO_{3})_{3}·9H_{2}O	50.2	70.1	95.6	126	166						
Gadolinium(III) hydroxide	Gd(OH)_{3}			1.882×10^{−5}								
Gadolinium(III) sulfate	Gd_{2}(SO_{4})_{3}	3.98	3.3	2.6	2.32							
D-Galactose	C_{6}H_{12}O_{6}			10.3								68.3
Gallium chloride	GaCl_{3}			180								
Gallium hydroxide	Ga(OH)_{3}			8.616×10^{−9}								
Gallium oxalate	Ga_{2}(C_{2}O_{4})_{3}·4H_{2}O			0.4								
Gallium selenate	Ga_{2}(SeO_{4})_{3}·16H_{2}O			18.1								
D-Glucose	C_{6}H_{12}O_{6}			90								
Gold(III) chloride	AuCl_{3}			68								
Gold(V) oxalate	Au_{2}(C_{2}O_{4})_{5}			0.258								

=== H ===
Substance	Formula	0 °C	10 °C	20 °C	30 °C	40 °C	50 °C	60 °C	70 °C	80 °C	90 °C	100 °C
Hafnium(III) hydroxide	Hf(OH)_{3}			4.503×10^{−4}								
Hafnium(IV) hydroxide	Hf(OH)_{4}			4.503×10^{−6}								
Helium	He			0.6								
Holmium(III) hydroxide	Ho(OH)_{3}			2.519×10^{−5}								
Holmium(III) sulfate	Ho_{2}(SO_{4})_{3}·8H_{2}O			8.18	6.1	4.52						
Hydrogen chloride	HCl	81	75	70	65.5	61	57.5	53	50	47	43	40
Hydrogen sulfide	H_{2}S			0.33								

=== I ===
Substance	Formula	0 °C	10 °C	20 °C	30 °C	40 °C	50 °C	60 °C	70 °C	80 °C	90 °C	100 °C
Indium(III) bromide	InBr_{3}			571								
Indium(III) chloride	InCl_{3}		210	212								
Indium(III) fluoride	InF_{3}			11.2								
Indium(III) hydroxide	In(OH)_{3}			3.645×10^{−8}								
Indium(III) iodate	In(IO_{3})_{3}			0.067								
Indium(III) sulfide	In_{2}S_{3}			2.867×10^{−14}								
Iron(II) bromide	FeBr_{2}	101	109	117	124	133		144		168	176	184
Iron(II) carbonate	FeCO_{3}			6.554×10^{−5}								
Iron(II) chloride	FeCl_{2}	49.7	59	62.5	66.7	70		78.3		88.7	92.3	94.9
Iron(II) fluorosilicate	FeSiF_{6}·6H_{2}O	72.1	74.4		77			84		88		100
Iron(II) hydroxide	Fe(OH)_{2}			5.255×10^{−5}								
Iron(II) nitrate	Fe(NO_{3})_{2}·6H_{2}O	113	134									
Iron(II) oxalate	FeC_{2}O_{4}·2H_{2}O			0.008								
Iron(II) perchlorate	Fe(ClO_{4})_{2}·6H_{2}O			299								
Iron(II) sulfate	FeSO_{4}			28.8		40	48	60	73.3		101	79.9
Iron(III) arsenate	FeAsO_{4}			1.47×10^{−9}								
Iron(III) chloride	FeCl_{3}·6H_{2}O	74.4		91.8	107							
Iron(III) fluoride	FeF_{3}			0.091								
Iron(III) hydroxide	Fe(OH)_{3}			2.097×10^{−9}								
Iron(III) iodate	Fe(IO_{3})_{3}			0.36								
Iron(III) nitrate	Fe(NO_{3})_{3}·9H_{2}O	112		138		175						
Iron(III) perchlorate	Fe(ClO_{4})_{3}	289		368	422	478		772				
Iron(III) sulfate	Fe_{2}(SO_{4})_{3}·H_{2}O			25.6								

=== L ===
Substance	Formula	0 °C	10 °C	20 °C	30 °C	40 °C	50 °C	60 °C	70 °C	80 °C	90 °C	100 °C
Lactose	C_{12}H_{22}O_{11}			8								
Lanthanum(III) acetate	La(C_{2}H_{3}O_{2})_{3}·H_{2}O			16.9								
Lanthanum(III) bromate	La(BrO_{3})_{3}	98	120	149	200							
Lanthanum(III) carbonate	La_{2}(CO_{3})_{3}			0.0000125								
Lanthanum(III) iodate	La(IO_{3})_{3}			0.04575								
Lanthanum(III) molybdate	La_{2}(MoO_{4})_{3}			0.002473								
Lanthanum(III) nitrate	La(NO_{3})_{3}	100		136		168		247				
Lanthanum(III) selenate	La_{2}(SeO_{4})_{3}	50.5	45	45	45	45		18.5		5.4	2.2	
Lanthanum(III) sulfate	La_{2}(SO_{4})_{3}	3	2.72	2.33	1.9	1.67		1.26		0.91	0.79	0.69
Lanthanum(III) tungstate	La_{2}(WO_{4})_{3}·3H_{2}O			6.06								
Lead(II) acetate	Pb(C_{2}H_{3}O_{2})_{2}	19.8	29.5	44.3	69.8	116						
Lead(II) azide	Pb(N_{3})_{2}			0.0249								
Lead(II) bromate	Pb(BrO_{3})_{2}			7.92								
Lead(II) bromide	PbBr_{2}	0.45	0.63	0.973	1.12	1.5		2.29		3.32	3.86	4.55
Lead(II) carbonate	PbCO_{3}			7.269×10^{−5}								
Lead(II) chlorate	Pb(ClO_{3})_{2}			144								
Lead(II) chloride	PbCl_{2}	0.67	0.82	1.08	1.2	1.42		1.94		2.54	2.88	3.2
Lead(II) chromate	PbCrO_{4}			1.71×10^{−5}								
Lead(II) ferrocyanide	PbFe(CN)_{6}			5.991×10^{−4}								
Lead(II) fluoride	PbF_{2}			0.0671								
Lead(II) fluorosilicate	PbSiF_{6}	190		222				403		428		463
Lead(II) hydrogen phosphate	PbHPO_{4}			3.457×10^{−4}								
Lead(II) hydrogen phosphite	PbHPO_{3}			0.02187								
Lead(II) hydroxide	Pb(OH)_{2}			1.615×10^{−4}								
Lead(II) iodate	Pb(IO_{3})_{2}			0.0024								
Lead(II) iodide	PbI_{2}	0.044	0.056	0.076	0.09	0.124		0.193		0.294		0.42
Lead(II) molybdate	PbMoO_{4}			1.161×10^{−5}								
Lead(II) nitrate	Pb(NO_{3})_{2}	37.5	46.2	54.3	63.4	72.1		91.6		111		133
Lead(II) oxalate	PbC_{2}O_{4}			6.495×10^{−4}								
Lead(II) perchlorate	Pb(ClO_{4})_{2}·3H_{2}O			440								
Lead(II) selenate	PbSeO_{4}			0.0131								
Lead(II) sulfate	PbSO_{4}			0.00443								
Lead(II) sulfide	PbS			6.767×10^{−13}								
Lead(II) tartrate	PbC_{4}H_{4}O_{6}			0.0025								
Lead(II) thiocyanate	Pb(SCN)_{2}			0.553								
Lead(II) thiosulfate	PbS_{2}O_{3}			0.0202								
Lead(II) tungstate	PbWO_{4}			0.02838								
Lead(IV) hydroxide	Pb(OH)_{4}			7.229×10^{−11}								
Lithium acetate	LiC_{2}H_{3}O_{2}	31.2	35.1	40.8	50.6	68.6						
Lithium azide	LiN_{3}	61.3	64.2	67.2	71.2	75.4		86.6				100
Lithium benzoate	LiC_{7}H_{5}O_{2}	38.9	41.6	44.7	53.8							
Lithium bicarbonate	LiHCO_{3}			5.74								
Lithium bromate	LiBrO_{3}	154	166	179	198	221		269		308	329	355
Lithium bromide	LiBr	143	147	160	183	211		223		245		266
Lithium carbonate	Li_{2}CO_{3}	1.54	1.43	1.33	1.26	1.17		1.01		0.85		0.72
Lithium chlorate	LiClO_{3}	241	283	372	488	604		777				
Lithium chloride	LiCl	69.2	74.5	83.5	86.2	89.8		98.4		112	121	128
Lithium chromate	Li_{2}CrO_{4}·2H_{2}O			142								
Lithium dichromate	Li_{2}Cr_{2}O_{7}·2H_{2}O				151							
Lithium dihydrogen phosphate	LiH_{2}PO_{4}	126										
Lithium fluoride	LiF			0.127	0.135							
Lithium fluorosilicate	Li_{2}SiF_{6}·2H_{2}O			73								
Lithium formate	LiHCO_{2}	32.3	35.7	39.3	44.1	49.5		64.7		92.7	116	138
Lithium hydrogen phosphite	Li_{2}HPO_{3}	4.43			9.97	7.61		7.11				6.03
Lithium hydroxide	LiOH	12.7	12.7	12.8	12.9	13.0	13.3	13.8		15.3		17.5
Lithium iodide	LiI	151	157	165	171	179		202		435	440	481
Lithium molybdate	Li_{2}MoO_{4}	82.6		79.5	79.5	78						73.9
Lithium nitrate	LiNO_{3}	53.4	60.8	70.1	138	152		175				
Lithium nitrite	LiNO_{2}	70.9	82.5	96.8	114	133		177		233	272	324
Lithium oxalate	Li_{2}C_{2}O_{4}			8								
Lithium perchlorate	LiClO_{4}	42.7	49	56.1	63.6	72.3		92.3		128	151	
Lithium permanganate	LiMnO_{4}			71.4								
Lithium phosphate	Li_{3}PO_{4}			0.039								
Lithium selenide	Li_{2}Se			57.7								
Lithium selenite	Li_{2}SeO_{3}	25	23.3	21.5	19.6	17.9		14.7		11.9	11.1	9.9
Lithium sulfate	Li_{2}SO_{4}	36.1	35.5	34.8	34.2	33.7		32.6		31.4	30.9	
Lithium tartrate	Li_{2}C_{4}H_{4}O_{6}	42	31.8	27.1	26.6	27.2		29.5				
Lithium thiocyanate	LiSCN			114	131	153						
Lithium vanadate	LiVO_{3}	2.5		4.82	6.28	4.38		2.67				
Lutetium(III) hydroxide	Lu(OH)_{3}			1.164×10^{−5}								
Lutetium(III) sulfate	Lu_{2}(SO_{4})_{3}·8H_{2}O			57.9								

=== M ===
Substance	Formula	0 °C	10 °C	20 °C	30 °C	40 °C	50 °C	60 °C	70 °C	80 °C	90 °C	100 °C
Magnesium acetate	Mg(C_{2}H_{3}O_{2})_{2}	56.7	59.7	53.4	68.6	75.7		118				
Magnesium benzoate	Mg(C_{7}H_{5}O_{2})_{2}·H_{2}O					5						
Magnesium bromate	Mg(BrO_{3})_{2}·6H_{2}O					58						
Magnesium bromide	MgBr_{2}	98	99	101	104	106		112				125
Magnesium carbonate	MgCO_{3}			0.039								
Magnesium chlorate	Mg(ClO_{3})_{2}	114	123	135	155	178		242			268	
Magnesium chloride	MgCl_{2}	52.9	53.6	54.6	55.8	57.5		61		66.1	69.5	73.3
Magnesium chromate	MgCrO_{4}·7H_{2}O			137								
Magnesium fluoride	MgF_{2}			0.007325								
Magnesium fluorosilicate	MgSiF_{6}	26.3		30.8		34.9		44.4				
Magnesium formate	Mg(HCO_{2})_{2}	14	14.2	14.4	14.9	15.9		17.9		20.5	22.2	22.9
Magnesium hydroxide	Mg(OH)_{2}			9.628×10^{−4}								0.004
Magnesium iodate	Mg(IO_{3})_{2}		7.2	8.6	10	11.7		15.2		15.5	15.6	
Magnesium iodide	MgI_{2}	120		140		173				186		
Magnesium molybdate	MgMoO_{4}			13.7								
Magnesium nitrate	Mg(NO_{3})_{2}	62.1	66	69.5	73.6	78.9		78.9		91.6	106	
Magnesium oxalate	MgC_{2}O_{4}			0.104								
Magnesium oxide	MgO			0.009								
Magnesium perchlorate	Mg(ClO_{4})_{2}			49.6								
Magnesium phosphate	Mg_{3}(PO_{4})_{2}			2.588×10^{−4}								
Magnesium selenate	MgSeO_{4}	20	30.4	38.3	44.3	48.6		55.8				
Magnesium selenite	MgSeO_{3}			0.05454								
Magnesium sulfate	MgSO_{4}	25.5	30.4	35.1	39.7	44.7	50.4	54.8	59.2	54.8	52.9	50.2
Magnesium sulfite hexahydrate	MgSO_{3}·6H_{2}O			0.52(25 °C)								
Magnesium thiosulfate	MgS_{2}O_{3}			50								
Maltose	C_{12}H_{22}O_{11}			108								
D-Mannose	C_{6}H_{12}O_{6}			248								
Manganese(II) bromide	MnBr_{2}	127	136	147	157	169		197		225	226	228
Manganese(II) carbonate	MnCO_{3}			4.877×10^{−5}								
Manganese(II) chloride	MnCl_{2}	63.4	68.1	73.9	80.8	88.5		109		113	114	115
Manganese(II) ferrocyanide	Mn_{2}Fe(CN)_{6}			0.001882								
Manganese(II) fluoride	MnF_{2}			0.96		0.67		0.44				0.48
Manganese(II) fluorosilicate	MnSiF_{6}·6H_{2}O			140								
Manganese(II) hydroxide	Mn(OH)_{2}			3.221×10^{−4}								
Manganese(II) nitrate	Mn(NO_{3})_{2}	102	118	139	206							
Manganese(II) oxalate	MnC_{2}O_{4}·2H_{2}O	0.02	0.024	0.028	0.033							
Manganese(II) sulfate	MnSO_{4}	52.9	59.7	62.9	62.9	60		53.6		45.6	40.9	35.3
Mercury(I) azide	Hg_{2}(N_{3})_{2}			0.02727								
Mercury(I) bromide	Hg_{2}Br_{2}			1.352×10^{−6}								
Mercury(I) carbonate	Hg_{2}CO_{3}			4.351×10^{−7}								
Mercury(I) chloride	Hg_{2}Cl_{2}			3.246×10^{−5}								
Mercury(I) chromate	Hg_{2}CrO_{4}			0.002313								
Mercury(I) cyanide	Hg_{2}(CN)_{2}			2.266×10^{−12}								
Mercury(I) perchlorate	Hg_{2}(ClO_{4})_{2}	282	325	407	455		499		541		580	
Mercury(I) sulfate	Hg_{2}SO_{4}			0.04277								
Mercury(II) acetate	Hg(C_{2}H_{3}O_{2})_{2}			25								
Mercury(II) benzoate	Hg(C_{7}H_{5}O_{2})_{2}·H_{2}O			1.1								
Mercury(II) bromate	Hg(BrO_{3})_{2}·2H_{2}O			0.08								
Mercury(II) bromide	HgBr_{2}	0.3	0.4	0.56	0.66	0.91		1.68		2.77		4.9
Mercury(II) chlorate	Hg(ClO_{3})_{2}			25								
Mercury(II) chloride	HgCl_{2}	3.63	4.82	6.57	8.34	10.2		16.3		30		61.3
Mercury(II) cyanide	Hg(CN)_{2}			9.3								
Mercury(II) iodate	Hg(IO_{3})_{2}			0.002372								
Mercury(II) iodide	HgI_{2}			0.006								
Mercury(II) oxalate	HgC_{2}O_{4}			0.011								
Mercury(II) sulfide	HgS			2.943×10^{−25}								
Mercury(II) thiocyanate	Hg(SCN)_{2}			0.063								

=== N and O ===
Substance	Formula	0 °C	10 °C	20 °C	30 °C	40 °C	50 °C	60 °C	70 °C	80 °C	90 °C	100 °C
Neodymium(III) acetate	Nd(C_{2}H_{3}O_{2})_{3}·H_{2}O			26.2								
Neodymium(III) bromate	Nd(BrO_{3})_{3}	43.9	59.2	75.6	95.2	116						
Neodymium(III) chloride	NdCl_{3}		96.7	98	99.6	102		105				
Neodymium(III) molybdate	Nd_{2}(MoO_{4})_{3}				0.0019							
Neodymium(III) nitrate	Nd(NO_{3})_{3}	127	133	142	145	159		211				
Neodymium(III) selenate	Nd_{2}(SeO_{4})_{3}	45.2	44.6	41.8	39.9	39.9		43.9		7	3.3	
Neodymium(III) sulfate	Nd_{2}(SO_{4})_{3}	13	9.7	7.1	5.3	4.1		2.8		2.2	1.2	
Nickel(II) acetate	Ni(C_{2}H_{3}O_{2})_{2}											
Nickel(II) bromate	Ni(BrO_{3})_{2}·6H_{2}O			28								
Nickel(II) bromide	NiBr_{2}	113	122	131	138	144		153		154		155
Nickel(II) carbonate	NiCO_{3}			9.643×10^{−4}								
Nickel(II) chlorate	Ni(ClO_{3})_{2}	111	120	133	155	181		221		308		
Nickel(II) chloride	NiCl_{2}	53.4	56.3	66.8	70.6	73.2		81.2		86.6		87.6
Nickel(II) fluoride	NiF_{2}		2.55	2.56				2.56			2.59	
Nickel(II) formate	Ni(HCO_{2})_{2}·2H_{2}O		3.15	3.25								
Nickel(II) hydroxide	Ni(OH)_{2}			0.013								
Nickel(II) iodate	Ni(IO_{3})_{2}	0.74		0.062	1.43							
Nickel(II) iodide	NiI_{2}	124	135	148	161	174		184		187	188	
Nickel(II) nitrate	Ni(NO_{3})_{2}	79.2		94.2	105	119		158		187	188	
Nickel oxalate	NiC_{2}O_{4}·2H_{2}O			0.00118								
Nickel(II) perchlorate	Ni(ClO_{4})_{2}	105	107	110	113	117						
Nickel(II) pyrophosphate	Ni_{2}P_{2}O_{7}			0.001017								
Nickel(II) sulfate	NiSO_{4}·6H_{2}O			44.4	46.6	49.2		55.6		64.5	70.1	76.7
Nitric oxide	NO			0.0056								
Nitrous oxide	N_{2}O			0.112								
Oxygen at a partial pressure of 21 kPa	O_{2}	0.00146	0.00113	0.00091	0.00076	0.00065						
Oxalic acid	H_{2}C_{2}O_{4}·2H_{2}O	4.96	8.51	13.3	19.9	30.1		62.1		118	168	

=== P ===
Substance	Formula	0 °C	10 °C	20 °C	30 °C	40 °C	50 °C	60 °C	70 °C	80 °C	90 °C	100 °C
Palladium(II) hydroxide	Pd(OH)_{2}			4.106×10^{−10}								
Palladium(IV) hydroxide	Pd(OH)_{4}			5.247×10^{−14}								
Phenol	C_{6}H_{5}OH			8.3		miscible						
Platinum(II) hydroxide	Pt(OH)_{2}			3.109×10^{−11}								
Platinum(IV) bromide	PtBr_{4}			1.352×10^{−7}								
Plutonium(III) fluoride	PuF_{3}			3.144×10^{−4}								
Plutonium(IV) fluoride	PuF_{4}			3.622×10^{−4}								
Plutonium(IV) iodate	Pu(IO_{3})_{4}			0.07998								
Polonium(II) sulfide	PoS			2.378×10^{−14}								
Potassium acetate	KC_{2}H_{3}O_{2}	216	233	256	283	324		350		381	398	
Potassium arsenate	K_{3}AsO_{4}			19								
Potassium azide	KN_{3}	41.4	46.2	50.8	55.8	61						106
Potassium benzoate	KC_{7}H_{5}O_{2}		65.8	70.7	76.7	82.1						
Potassium bromate	KBrO_{3}	3.09	4.72	6.91	9.64	13.1		22.7		34.1		49.9
Potassium bromide	KBr	53.6	59.5	65.3	70.7	75.4		85.5		94.9	99.2	104
Potassium hexabromoplatinate	K_{2}PtBr_{6}			1.89								
Potassium carbonate	K_{2}CO_{3}	105	109	111	114	117	121.2	127		140	148	156
Potassium chlorate	KClO_{3}	3.3	5.2	7.3	10.1	13.9		23.8		37.5	46	56.3
Potassium chloride	KCl	28	31.2	34.2	37.2	40.1	42.6	45.8		51.3	53.9	56.3
Potassium chromate	K_{2}CrO_{4}	56.3	60	63.7	66.7	67.8		70.1			74.5	
Potassium cyanide	KCN			50								
Potassium dichromate	K_{2}Cr_{2}O_{7}	4.7	7	12.3	18.1	26.3	34	45.6		73		
Potassium dihydrogen arsenate	KH_{2}AsO_{4}			19								
Potassium dihydrogen phosphate	KH_{2}PO_{4}	14.8	18.3	22.6	28	35.5	41	50.2		70.4	83.5	
Potassium ferricyanide	K_{3}Fe(CN)_{6}	30.2	38	46	53	59.3		70				91
Potassium ferrocyanide	K_{4}Fe(CN)_{6}	14.3	21.1	28.2	35.1	41.4		54.8		66.9	71.5	74.2
Potassium fluoride	KF	44.7	53.5	94.9	108	138		142		150		
Potassium formate	KHCO_{2}	328	313	337	361	398		471		580	658	
Potassium hydrogen carbonate	KHCO_{3}	22.5	27.4	33.7	39.9	47.5		65.6				
Potassium hydrogen phosphate	K_{2}HPO_{4}			150								
Potassium hydrogen sulfate	KHSO_{4}	36.2		48.6	54.3	61		76.4		96.1		122
Potassium hydrogen tartrate	KHC_{4}H_{4}O_{6}			0.6								6,2
Potassium hydroxide	KOH	95.7	103	112	126	134		154				178
Potassium iodate	KIO_{3}	4.6	6.27	8.08	10.3	12.6	14	18.3		24.8		32.3
Potassium iodide	KI	128	136	144	153	162		176		192	198	206
Potassium metabisulfite	K_{2}S_{2}O_{5}				45							
Potassium nitrate	KNO_{3}	13.3	20.9	31.6	45.8	63.9	85.5	110.0	138	169	202	246
Potassium nitrite	KNO_{2}	279	292	306	320	329		348		376	390	410
Potassium oxalate	K_{2}C_{2}O_{4}	25.5	31.9	36.4	39.9	43.8		53.2		63.6	69.2	75.3
Potassium perchlorate	KClO_{4}	0.76	1.06	1.68	2.56	3.73		7.3		13.4	17.7	22.3
Potassium periodate	KIO_{4}	0.17	0.28	0.42	0.65	1		2.1		4.4	5.9	
Potassium permanganate	KMnO_{4}	2.83	4.31	6.34	9.03	12.6	16.9	22.1				
Potassium persulfate	K_{2}S_{2}O_{8}			4.7								
Potassium phosphate	K_{3}PO_{4}		81.5	92.3	108	133						
Potassium selenate	K_{2}SeO_{4}	107	109	111	113	115		119		121		122
Potassium sulfate	K_{2}SO_{4}	7.4	9.3	11.1	13	14.8		18.2		21.4	22.9	24.1
Potassium tetraphenylborate	KB(C_{6}H_{5})_{4}			1.8×10^{−5}								
Potassium thiocyanate	KSCN	177	198	224	255	289		372		492	571	675
Potassium thiosulfate	K_{2}S_{2}O_{3}	96		155	175	205		238		293	312	
Potassium tungstate	K_{2}WO_{4}			51.5								
Praseodymium(III) acetate	Pr(C_{2}H_{3}O_{2})_{3}·H_{2}O			32								
Praseodymium(III) bromate	Pr(BrO_{3})_{3}	55.9	73	91.8	114	144						
Praseodymium(III) chloride	PrCl_{3}			104								
Praseodymium(III) molybdate	Pr_{2}(MoO_{4})_{3}			0.0015								
Praseodymium(III) nitrate	Pr(NO_{3})_{3}			112	162	178						
Praseodymium(III) sulfate	Pr_{2}(SO_{4})_{3}	19.8	15.6	12.6	9.89	2.56		5.04		3.5	1.1	0.91

=== R ===
Substance	Formula	0 °C	10 °C	20 °C	30 °C	40 °C	50 °C	60 °C	70 °C	80 °C	90 °C	100 °C
Radium chloride	RaCl_{2}			19.6								
Radium iodate	Ra(IO_{3})_{2}			0.04								
Radium nitrate	Ra(NO_{3})_{2}			12								
Radium sulfate	RaSO_{4}			2.1×10^{−4}								
Raffinose	C_{18}H_{32}O_{16}·5H_{2}O			14								
Rubidium acetate	RbC_{2}H_{3}O_{2}					86						
Rubidium bromate	RbBrO_{3}				3.6	5.1						
Rubidium bromide	RbBr	90	99	108	119	132		158				
Rubidium chlorate	RbClO_{3}	2.1	3.1	5.4	8	11.6		22		38	49	63
Rubidium chloride	RbCl	77	84	91	98	104		115		127	133	143
Rubidium chromate	Rb_{2}CrO_{4}	62	67.5	73.6	78.9	85.6		95.7				
Rubidium dichromate	Rb_{2}Cr_{2}O_{7}			5.9	10	15.2		32.3				
Rubidium fluoride	RbF			130.6 (18 °C)								
Rubidium fluorosilicate	RbSiF_{6}			0.157								
Rubidium formate	RbHCO_{2}		443	554	614	694		900				
Rubidium hydrogen carbonate	RbHCO_{3}			110								
Rubidium hydroxide	RbOH			180								
Rubidium iodate	RbIO_{3}			1.96								
Rubidium iodide	RbI			144								
Rubidium nitrate	RbNO_{3}	19.5	33	52.9	81.2	117		200		310	374	452
Rubidium perchlorate	RbClO_{4}	1.09	1.19	1.55	2.2	3.26		6.27		11	15.5	22
Rubidium periodate	RbIO_{4}			0.648								
Rubidium permanganate	RbMnO_{4}	0.41		1.12 (19 °C)		2.34	3.25	4.68				
Rubidium phosphate	Rb_{3}PO_{4}			220								
Rubidium selenate	Rb_{2}SeO_{4}			159								
Rubidium sulfate	Rb_{2}SO_{4}	37.5	42.6	48.1	53.6	58.5		67.5		75.1	78.6	81.8

=== S ===
Substance	Formula	0 °C	10 °C	20 °C	30 °C	40 °C	50 °C	60 °C	70 °C	80 °C	90 °C	100 °C
Samarium acetate	Sm(C_{2}H_{3}O_{2})_{3}·3H_{2}O			15								
Samarium bromate	Sm(BrO_{3})_{3}	34.2	47.6	62.5	79	98						
Samarium chloride	SmCl_{3}		92.4	93.4	94.6	96.9						
Samarium sulfate	Sm_{2}(SO_{4})_{3}·8H_{2}O			2.7	3.1							
Scandium oxalate	Sc_{2}(C_{2}O_{4})_{3}·6H_{2}O			0.006								
Scandium sulfate	Sc_{2}(SO_{4})_{3}·5H_{2}O			54.6								
Silicon dioxide	SiO_{2}			0.012								
Silver acetate	AgC_{2}H_{3}O_{2}	0.73	0.89	1.05	1.23	1.43		1.93		2.59		
Silver azide	AgN_{3}			7.931×10^{−4}								
Silver bromate	AgBrO_{3}		0.11	0.16	0.23	0.32		0.57		0.94	1.33	
Silver bromide	AgBr			1.328×10^{−5}								
Silver carbonate	Ag_{2}CO_{3}			0.003489								
Silver chlorate	AgClO_{3}		10.4	15.3	20.9	26.8						
Silver chloride	AgCl			1.923×10^{−4}			0.00052					
Silver chlorite	AgClO_{2}			0.248								
Silver chromate	Ag_{2}CrO_{4}			0.002157								
Silver cyanide	AgCN			1.467×10^{−7}								
Silver dichromate	Ag_{2}Cr_{2}O_{7}			0.159								
Silver fluoride	AgF	85.9	120	172	190	203						
Silver nitrate	AgNO_{3}	122	167	216	265	311		440		585	652	733
Silver oxalate	Ag_{2}C_{2}O_{4}			0.00327								
Silver oxide	Ag_{2}O			0.0012								
Silver perchlorate	AgClO_{4}	455	484	525	594	635						793
Silver permanganate	AgMnO_{4}			0.9								
Silver sulfate	Ag_{2}SO_{4}	0.57	0.7	0.8	0.89	0.98		1.15		1.3	1.36	1.41
Silver vanadate	AgVO_{3}			0.01462								
Sodium acetate	NaC_{2}H_{3}O_{2}	36.2	40.8	46.4	54.6	65.6		139		153	161	170
Sodium azide	NaN_{3}	38.9	39.9	40.8								
Sodium benzoate	NaC_{7}H_{5}O_{2}			66								
Sodium borohydride	NaBH_{4}	25		55		88.5						
Sodium bromate	NaBrO_{3}	24.2	30.3	36.4	42.6	48.8		62.6		75.7		90.8
Sodium bromide	NaBr	80.2	85.2	90.8	98.4	107		118		120	121	121
Sodium carbonate	Na_{2}CO_{3}	7	12.5	21.5	39.7	49		46		43.9	43.9	45.5
Sodium chlorate	NaClO_{3}	79.6	87.6	95.9	105	115		137		167	184	204
Sodium chloride	NaCl	35.65	35.72	35.89	36.09	36.37	36.69	37.04	37.46	37.93	38.47	38.99
Sodium chromate	Na_{2}CrO_{4}	31.7	50.1	84	88	96		115		125		126
Sodium cyanide	NaCN	40.8	48.1	58.7	71.2	dec						
Sodium dichromate	Na_{2}Cr_{2}O_{7}	163	172	183	198	215		269		376	405	415
Sodium fluoride	NaF	3.66		4.06	4.22	4.4		4.68		4.89		5.08
Sodium formate	HCO_{2}Na	43.9	62.5	81.2	102	108		122		138	147	160
Sodium hydrogen carbonate	NaHCO_{3}	7	8.1	9.6	11.1	12.7		16				
Sodium hydroxide	NaOH		98	109	119	129		174				
Sodium iodate	NaIO_{3}	2.48	4.59	8.08	10.7	13.3		19.8		26.6	29.5	33
Sodium iodide	NaI	159	167	178	191	205		257		295		302
Sodium metabisulfite	Na_{2}S_{2}O_{5}	45.1		65.3						88.7		96.3
Sodium metaborate	NaBO_{2}	16.4	20.8	25.4	31.4	40.4		63.9		84.5		125.2
Sodium molybdate	Na_{2}MoO_{4}	44.1	64.7	65.3	66.9	68.6		71.8				
Sodium nitrate	NaNO_{3}	73	80.8	87.6	94.9	102		122		148		180
Sodium nitrite	NaNO_{2}	71.2	75.1	80.8	87.6	94.9		111		133		160
Sodium oxalate	Na_{2}C_{2}O_{4}	2.69	3.05	3.41	3.81	4.18		4.93		5.71		6.5
Sodium perchlorate	NaClO_{4}	167	183	201	222	245		288		306		329
Sodium periodate	NaIO_{4}	1.83	5.6	10.3	19.9	30.4						
Sodium permanganate	NaMnO_{4}			90								
Monosodium phosphate	NaH_{2}PO_{4}	56.5	69.8	86.9	107	133		172		211	234	
Disodium phosphate	Na_{2}HPO_{4}			7.7								
Sodium phosphate	Na_{3}PO_{4}	4.5	8.2	12.1	16.3	20.2		20.9		60	68.1	77
Sodium pyrophosphate	Na_{4}P_{2}O_{7}	2.26		6.23								42.2
Sodium selenate	Na_{2}SeO_{4}	13.3	25.2	26.9	77	81.8		78.6		74.8	73	72.7
Sodium sulfate	Na_{2}SO_{4}	4.9	9.1	19.5	40.8	48.8		45.3		43.7	42.7	42.5
Sodium sulfite	Na_{2}SO_{3}			27.0								
Sodium tetraborate (decahydrate)	Na_{2}B_{4}O_{7}·10H_{2}O	2	2.3	2.5	4	6	10	15				65.5
Sodium tetraborate (pentahydrate)	Na_{2}B_{4}O_{7}·5H_{2}O			3.7					20	23	28	35
Sodium tetraborate (tetrahydrate)	Na_{2}B_{4}O_{7}·4H_{2}O								17	20	23	28
Sodium tetrafluoroborate	NaBF_{4}	72	85									210
Sodium tetraphenylborate	NaB(C_{6}H_{5})_{4}			47								
Sodium thiosulfate	Na_{2}S_{2}O_{3}	71.5		73		77.6				90.8		97.2
Strontium acetate	Sr(C_{2}H_{3}O_{2})_{2}	37	42.9	41.1	39.5	38.3		36.8		36.1	36.2	36.4
Strontium bromate	Sr(BrO_{3})_{2}·H_{2}O			30.9								41
Strontium bromide	SrBr_{2}	85.2	93.4	102	112	123		150		182		223
Strontium carbonate	SrCO_{3}			0.0011								0.065
Strontium chlorate	Sr(ClO_{3})_{2}			175								
Strontium chloride	SrCl_{2}	43.5	47.7	52.9	58.7	65.3		81.8		90.5		101
Strontium chromate	SrCrO_{4}			0.085	0.090							
Strontium fluoride	SrF_{2}			1.2×10^{−4}								
Strontium formate	Sr(HCO_{2})_{2}	9.1	10.6	12.7	15.2	17.8		25		31.9	32.9	34.4
Strontium hydroxide	Sr(OH)_{2}	0.41				1.77						21.83
Strontium iodate	Sr(IO_{3})_{2}			0.19								0.35
Strontium iodide	SrI_{2}	165		178		192		218		270	365	383
Strontium molybdate	SrMoO_{4}			0.01107								
Strontium nitrate	Sr(NO_{3})_{2}	39.5	54.9	70.8	87.6	91.3	92.6	94.0	97.2	99.0	101.1	
Strontium perchlorate	Sr(ClO_{4})_{2}	233.8	258.7	291.7	327.5	363.9						
Strontium selenate	SrSeO_{4}			0.656								
Strontium sulfate	SrSO_{4}	0.0113	0.0129	0.0132	0.0138	0.0141		0.0131		0.0116	0.0115	
Strontium thiosulfate	SrS_{2}O_{3}·5H_{2}O		2.5									
Strontium tungstate	SrWO_{4}			3.957×10^{−4}								
Sucrose	C_{12}H_{22}O_{11}	181.9	190.6	201.9	216.7	235.6	259.6	288.8	323.7	365.1	414.9	476.0
Sulfur dioxide	SO_{2}			9.4								

=== T ===
Substance	Formula	0 °C	10 °C	20 °C	30 °C	40 °C	50 °C	60 °C	70 °C	80 °C	90 °C	100 °C
Terbium bromate	Tb(BrO_{3})_{3}·9H_{2}O	66.4	89.7	117	152	198						
Terbium sulfate	Tb_{2}(SO_{4})_{3}·8H_{2}O			3.56								
Thallium(I) azide	TlN_{3}	0.171	0.236	0.364								
Thallium(I) bromate	TlBrO_{3}			0.306								
Thallium(I) bromide	TlBr	0.0238	0.032	0.0476	0.068	0.097		0.204				
Thallium(I) carbonate	Tl_{2}CO_{3}			5.3								
Thallium(I) chlorate	TlClO_{3}	2		3.92		12.7				36.6		57.3
Thallium(I) chloride	TlCl	0.17	0.24	0.34	0.46	0.60	0.80	1.02		1.60		2.41
Thallium(I) cyanide	TlCN			16.8								
Thallium(I) fluoride	TlF		78.6 (15 °C)									
Thallium(I) formate	TlHCO_{2}			500								
Thallium(I) hydroxide	TlOH	25.4	29.6	35	40.4	49.4		73.3		106	126	150
Thallium(I) iodate	TlIO_{3}			0.06678								
Thallium(I) iodide	TlI	0.002		0.006		0.015		0.035		0.07		0.12
Thallium(I) nitrate	TlNO_{3}	3.91	6.22	9.55	14.3	20.9	30.4	46.2	69.5	111	200	414
Thallium(I) oxalate	Tl_{2}C_{2}O_{4}			1.83								
Thallium(I) perchlorate	TlClO_{4}	6	8.04	13.1	19.7	28.3		50.8		81.5		
Thallium(I) phosphate	Tl_{3}PO_{4}			0.15								
Thallium(I) pyrophosphate	Tl_{4}P_{2}O_{7}			40								
Thallium(I) selenate	Tl_{2}SeO_{4}		2.17	2.8						8.5		10.8
Thallium(I) sulfate	Tl_{2}SO_{4}	2.73	3.7	4.87	6.16	7.53		11		14.6	16.5	18.4
Thallium(I) thiocyanate	TlSCN		4.6×10^{−5}	1.32×10^{−4} (21 °C)	2.89×10^{−4}	6.76×10^{−4}						
Thallium(I) vanadate	TlVO_{3}			0.87								
Thorium(IV) fluoride	ThF_{4}·4H_{2}O			0.914								
Thorium(IV) iodate	Th(IO_{3})_{4}			0.03691								
Thorium(IV) nitrate	Th(NO_{3})_{4}	186	187	191								
Thorium(IV) selenate	Th(SeO_{4})_{2}·9H_{2}O	0.65										
Thorium(IV) sulfate	Th(SO_{4})_{2}·9H_{2}O	0.74	0.99	1.38	1.99	3						
Thulium(III) nitrate	Tm(NO_{3})_{3}			212								
Tin(II) bromide	SnBr_{2}	85										
Tin(II) chloride	SnCl_{2}	84										
Tin(II) fluoride	SnF_{2}			30								
Tin(II) iodide	SnI_{2}			0.99	1.17	1.42		2.11		3.04	3.58	4.2
Tin(II) sulfate	SnSO_{4}			18.9								
Trehalose	C_{12}H_{22}O_{11}			68.9								

=== U, V, and X ===
Substance	Formula	0 °C	10 °C	20 °C	30 °C	40 °C	50 °C	60 °C	70 °C	80 °C	90 °C	100 °C
Uranyl acetate	UO_{2}(C_{2}H_{3}O_{2})_{2}·2H_{2}O			7.69								
Uranyl chloride	UO_{2}Cl_{2}			320								
Uranyl formate	UO_{2}(HCO_{2})_{2}·H_{2}O			7.2								
Uranyl iodate	UO_{2}(IO_{3})_{2}·H_{2}O			0.124								
Uranyl nitrate	UO_{2}(NO_{3})_{2}	98	107	122	141	167		317		388	426	474
Uranyl oxalate	UO_{2}C_{2}O_{4}		0.45	0.5	0.61	0.8		1.22		1.94		3.16
Uranyl sulfate	UO_{2}SO_{4}·3H_{2}O			21								
Urea	CO(NH_{2})_{2}	66.7		108		167		251		400		733
Vanadium(V) oxide	V_{2}O_{5}			0.8								
Xenon	Xe	24.1 ml		11.9 ml			8.4 ml			7.12 ml		
Xylose	C_{5}H_{10}O_{5}			117								

=== Y ===
Substance	Formula	0 °C	10 °C	20 °C	30 °C	40 °C	50 °C	60 °C	70 °C	80 °C	90 °C	100 °C
Ytterbium(III) nitrate	Yb(NO_{3})_{3}			239								
Ytterbium(III) sulfate	Yb_{2}(SO_{4})_{3}	44.2	37.5	38.4	22.2	17.2		10.4		6.4	5.8	4.7
Yttrium(III) acetate	Y(C_{2}H_{3}O_{2})_{3}·4H_{2}O			9.03								
Yttrium(III) bromate	Y(BrO_{3})_{3}·9H_{2}O			168								
Yttrium(III) bromide	YBr_{3}	63.9		75.1		87.3		101		116	123	
Yttrium(III) chloride	YCl_{3}	77.3	78.1	78.8	79.6	80.8						
Yttrium(III) fluoride	YF_{3}			0.005769								
Yttrium(III) nitrate	Y(NO_{3})_{3}	93.1	106	123	143	163		200				
Yttrium(III) sulfate	Y_{2}(SO_{4})_{3}	8.05	7.67	7.3	6.78	6.09		4.44		2.89	2.2	

=== Z ===
Substance	Formula	0 °C	10 °C	20 °C	30 °C	40 °C	50 °C	60 °C	70 °C	80 °C	90 °C	100 °C
Zinc acetate	Zn(C_{2}H_{3}O_{2})_{2}			30								67
Zinc bromide	ZnBr_{2}	389		446	528	591		618		645		672
Zinc carbonate	ZnCO_{3}			4.692×10^{−5}								
Zinc chlorate	Zn(ClO_{3})_{2}	145	152	200	209	223						
Zinc chloride	ZnCl_{2}	342	363	395	437	452		488		541		614
Zinc cyanide	Zn(CN)_{2}			0.0005								0.0067
Zinc fluoride	ZnF_{2}			1.6								
Zinc formate	Zn(HCO_{2})_{2}	3.7	4.3	5.2	6.1	7.4	9.2	11.8	15.5	21.2	28.8	38.0
Zinc iodate	Zn(IO_{3})_{2}·2H_{2}O			0.07749								
Zinc iodide	ZnI_{2}	430		432		445		467		490		510
Zinc nitrate	Zn(NO_{3})_{2}	98			138	211						
Zinc oxalate	ZnC_{2}O_{4}·2H_{2}O			1.38×10^{−9}								
Zinc oxide	ZnO			4.20×10^{−4}								
Zinc permanganate	Zn(MnO_{4})_{2}			33.3								
Zinc sulfate	ZnSO_{4}	41.6	47.2	53.8	61.3	70.5		75.4		71.1		60.5
Zinc sulfite	ZnSO_{3}·2H_{2}O			0.16								
Zinc tartrate	ZnC_{4}H_{4}O_{6}			0.022	0.041	0.06		0.104		0.59		
Zirconium fluoride	ZrF_{4}			1.32								
Zirconium sulfate	Zr(SO_{4})_{2}·4H_{2}O			52.5								
