= Benzoates =

Benzoates (salts of benzoic acid) can refer to:

- Ammonium benzoate
- Calcium benzoate
- Copper benzoate
- Denatonium benzoate
- Magnesium benzoate
- Potassium benzoate
- Sodium benzoate
