= Lead(II) selenate =

Identifiers
CAS Number	7446-15-3
3D model (JSmol)	Interactive image
ChemSpider	21172687
ECHA InfoCard	100.028.363
EC Number	231-199-4
PubChem CID	53471519
UNII	61521P1U0Z
CompTox Dashboard (EPA)	DTXSID10883503
- InChI: InChI=1S/H2O4Se.Pb/c1-5(2,3)4;/h(H2,1,2,3,4);/q;+2/p-2 Key: PKMXSWXQNCMWNG-UHFFFAOYSA-L
- SMILES: [Pb+2].[O-][Se](=O)(=O)[O-]

Properties
Chemical formula	PbSeO_{4}
Molar mass	350.16
Appearance	transparent solid
Density	6.37 g·cm^{−3}
Solubility in water	130 mg/l at 25 °C
Solubility	Soluble in concentrated acids

Hazards
- GHS labelling
Pictograms	(GHS06: Toxic) (GHS08: Health hazard) (GHS09: Environmental hazard)
Signal word	Warning
Hazard statements	H301, H330, H331, H360, H373, H410
Precautionary statements	P203, P260, P264, P270, P271, P273, P280, P284, P301+P316, P304+P340, P316, P318, P319, P320, P321, P330, P391, P403+P233, P405, P501

Related compounds
Other anions	lead(II) sulfate lead(II) tellurate
- Except where otherwise noted, data are given for materials in their standard state (at 25 °C [77 °F], 100 kPa). Infobox references

Lead(II) selenate is a selenate of lead, with the chemical formula PbSeO_{4}.

== Preparation ==
Lead(II) selenate can be obtained by reacting a mixture of lead(II,IV) oxide and selenium dioxide with hydrogen peroxide. Lead(II) selenate is poorly soluble in water and can also be obtained through precipitation:

Pb^{2+} + SeO^{2−}_{4} → PbSeO_{4}↓
