= Copper(I) hydroxide =

Names
- Other names Cuprous hydroxide; Copper monohydroxide

Identifiers
CAS Number	19650-79-4
3D model (JSmol)	Interactive image
ChemSpider	8031144
PubChem CID	9855444
CompTox Dashboard (EPA)	DTXSID6034473
- InChI: InChI=1S/Cu.H2O/h;1H2/q+1;/p-1 Key: ZMHWUUMELDFBCZ-UHFFFAOYSA-M
- SMILES: [OH-].[Cu+]

Properties
Chemical formula	CuOH
Molar mass	80.55 g/mol
- Except where otherwise noted, data are given for materials in their standard state (at 25 °C [77 °F], 100 kPa). Infobox references

Copper(I) hydroxide is the inorganic compound with the chemical formula of CuOH. Little evidence exists for its existence. A similar situation applies to the monohydroxides of gold(I) and silver(I). Solid CuOH has been claimed however as an unstable yellow-red solid. The topic has been the subject of theoretical analysis. Copper(I) hydroxide would also be expected to easily oxidise to copper(II) hydroxide:

4CuOH + 2 H_{2}O + O_{2} → 4Cu(OH)_{2}

It would also be expected to rapidly dehydrate:

2CuOH → Cu_{2}O + H_{2}O

Solid CuOH would be of interest as a possible intermediate in the formation of copper(I) oxide (Cu_{2}O), which has diverse applications, e.g. in solar cells.

== Solid CuOH ==
Theoretical calculations predict that CuOH would be stable. Specifically, the dissociation of Cu(OH)_{2}^{−} leading to CuOH is expected to release 62 ± 3 kcal/mol.

Cu(OH)^{−}_{2} → CuOH + OH^{−}

Despite the absence of evidence for its existence, CuOH has been invoked as a catalyst in organic synthesis.

== Gaseous CuOH ==
Gaseous CuOH has been characterized spectroscopically using intracavity laser spectroscopy, single vibronic level emission, and microwave spectroscopic detection.

CuOH is calculated to be bent, with the point group C_{s}. In this case, the bond distance of the Cu-O bond was 1.818 Å and the bond distance of the O-H bond was 0.960 Å. The bond angle for this geometry was 131.9°. The compound is highly ionic in character, which is why this angle is not exactly 120°. Structural parameters for linear CuOH have also been examined computationally.

== Ligand-stabilized Cu(I) hydroxides ==
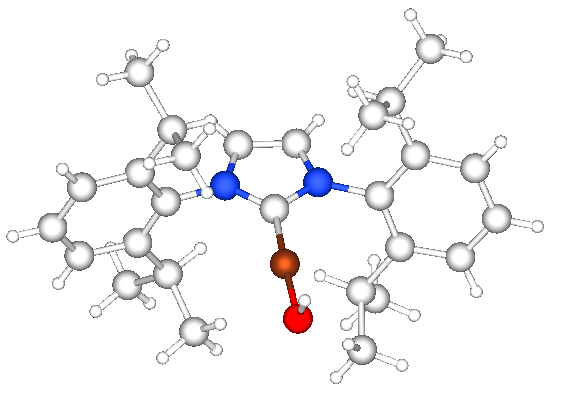
Structure of a CuOH(IPr) complex. Color code: blue = N, copper = Cu, red = O, white = C, H.

Although simple CuOH compounds are fairly elusive or restricted to the gas-phase within spectrometers, some derivatives are well characterized.

Specifically cuprous hydroxides have been prepared using bulky NHC co-ligands. In addition to Cu(IPr)OH, the dimer [Cu(IPr)]_{2}OH]^{+} (as its BF^{−}_{4} salt)) and the aquo complex [Cu(IPr)]OH_{2}]^{+} (as its SbF^{−}_{6} salt) have been characterized by X-ray crystallography.
