= Calcium azide =

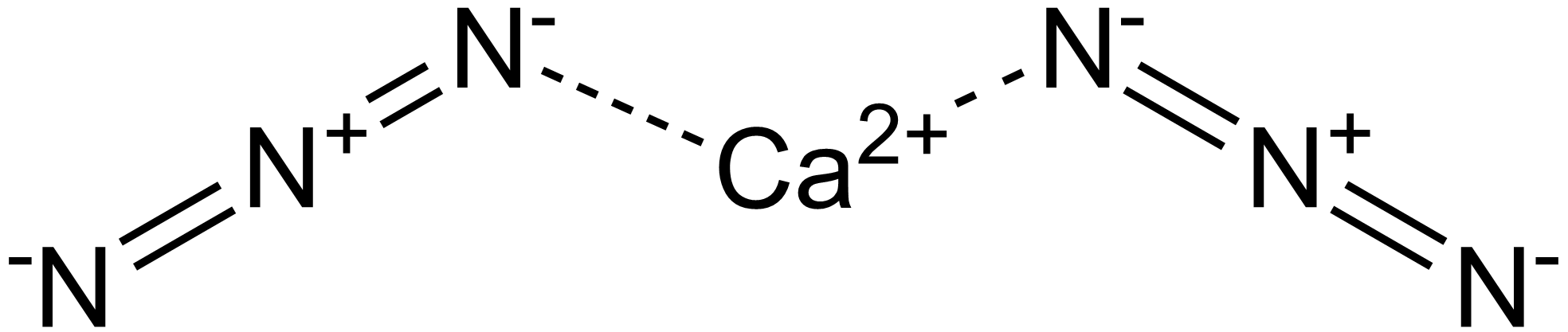

Identifiers
CAS Number	19465-88-4
3D model (JSmol)	Interactive image
ChemSpider	8373180
PubChem CID	10197680
CompTox Dashboard (EPA)	DTXSID30436590
- InChI: InChI=1S/Ca.2N3/c;2*1-3-2/q+2;2*-1 Key: UETLMBWMVIQIGU-UHFFFAOYSA-N
- SMILES: [N-]=[N+]=[N-].[N-]=[N+]=[N-].[Ca+2]

Properties
Chemical formula	Ca(N_{3})_{2}
Molar mass	124.12 g/mol
Appearance	colorless crystals
Melting point	100 °C (212 °F; 373 K) decomposes at 150 °C
Solubility in water	38.1 g/100 mL (0 °C)
Solubility	slightly soluble in ethanol insoluble in ether, acetone

Thermochemistry
Std enthalpy of formation (Δ_{f}H^{⦵}_{298})	14.2 kJ/mol
- Except where otherwise noted, data are given for materials in their standard state (at 25 °C [77 °F], 100 kPa). Infobox references

Calcium azide is a chemical compound with the formula Ca(N_{3})_{2}.

== Production ==
It can be obtained from a distilled reaction between hydrazoic acid and calcium hydroxide.

== Safety ==
Calcium azide is sensitive to impact, in which it may detonate and ignite.
