= Rubidium selenate =

Identifiers
CAS Number	7446-17-5
ECHA InfoCard	100.028.364
EC Number	231-200-8
PubChem CID	165605
CompTox Dashboard (EPA)	DTXSID60889575

Properties
Chemical formula	Rb_{2}SeO_{4}
Molar mass	313.89 g/mol
Appearance	Colorless crystals
Density	3.90 g/cm^{3}
Solubility in water	Very soluble in water

Structure
Crystal structure	Orthorhombic, β-K_{2}SO_{4} type
Space group	Pnma, No. 62
Lattice constant	a = 0.7961 nm, b = 1.0794 nm, c = 0.6161 nm
Formula units (Z)	4
- Except where otherwise noted, data are given for materials in their standard state (at 25 °C [77 °F], 100 kPa). Infobox references

Rubidium selenate is an inorganic compound of rubidium and the selenate ion, with the chemical formula Rb_{2}SeO_{4}. It is a colorless crystalline salt that is readily soluble in water. At room temperature it adopts an orthorhombic β-K_{2}SO_{4}-type structure and at high temperature undergoes a first-order transition to a hexagonal α-K_{2}SO_{4}-type phase.

== Preparation ==
Rubidium selenate can be prepared by neutralization of selenic acid with rubidium carbonate, followed by evaporation of the aqueous solution:

Rb_{2}CO_{3} + H_{2}SeO_{4} → Rb_{2}SeO_{4} + CO_{2}↑ + H_{2}O

Single crystals have been grown by slow evaporation of an equimolar aqueous solution of rubidium carbonate and selenic acid at about 311 K.

== Structure and phase transitions ==
At room temperature, Rb_{2}SeO_{4} crystallizes in the orthorhombic crystal system in space group Pnma (No. 62), historically also written in the non-standard setting Pnam. Its lattice parameters are approximately a = 7.961 Å, b = 10.794 Å and c = 6.161 Å, with four formula units per unit cell.

The room-temperature structure is of the β-K_{2}SO_{4} type. It contains nearly regular SeO_{4}^{2−} tetrahedra surrounded by rubidium ions. The arrangement is pseudohexagonal, reflected in the approximate relation between the orthorhombic lattice parameters.

On heating, rubidium selenate undergoes a first-order structural phase transition at about 818–821 K (545–548 °C). The high-temperature form is hexagonal, space group P6_{3}/mmc (No. 194), with lattice parameters at 898 K of a = 6.3428 Å and c = 8.5445 Å, and two formula units per unit cell.

The high-temperature phase is isostructural with Tl_{2}SeO_{4} and belongs to the α-K_{2}SO_{4} structure type.

Unlike several related A_{2}BX_{4} compounds, Rb_{2}SeO_{4} does not undergo a low-temperature incommensurate or ferroelectric transition. Heat-capacity, X-ray and neutron-scattering measurements found no additional structural phase transition down to 2 K, although a slight softening of a phonon branch was observed below about 100 K.

The same calorimetric study observed melting at about 1233 K (960 °C).

== Chemical properties ==
In the presence of excess selenic acid, rubidium selenate forms rubidium hydrogen selenate:

Rb_{2}SeO_{4} + H_{2}SeO_{4} → 2 RbHSeO_{4}

Under humid reducing conditions at elevated temperature, Rb_{2}SeO_{4} can partially decompose with formation of rubidium hydroxide. This decomposition produces a marked increase in electrical conductivity; at 317 °C in humidified 9% H_{2}/N_{2}, conductivities around 2 × 10^{−4} S cm^{−1} have been reported.
