= Zinc chlorate =

Names
- IUPAC name Zinc chlorate
- Other names Chloric acid, zinc salt

Identifiers
CAS Number	10361-95-2
3D model (JSmol)	Interactive image
ChemSpider	23542
ECHA InfoCard	100.030.719
PubChem CID	25206
UNII	3363718500
CompTox Dashboard (EPA)	DTXSID30890658
- InChI: InChI=1S/2ClHO3.Zn/c2*2-1(3)4;/h2*(H,2,3,4);/q;;+2/p-2 Key: GTQFPPIXGLYKCZ-UHFFFAOYSA-L; InChI=1/2ClHO3.Zn/c2*2-1(3)4;/h2*(H,2,3,4);/q;;+2/p-2 Key: GTQFPPIXGLYKCZ-NUQVWONBAC
- SMILES: [Zn+2].[O-]Cl(=O)=O.[O-]Cl(=O)=O

Properties
Chemical formula	Zn(ClO_{3})_{2}
Molar mass	232.29 g/mol
Appearance	yellow hygroscopic crystals
Density	2.15 g/cm^{3}
Melting point	60 °C (140 °F; 333 K) (decomposes)
Solubility in water	200 g/100 mL (20 °C)

Hazards
NFPA 704 (fire diamond)	1 0 1 OX
- Except where otherwise noted, data are given for materials in their standard state (at 25 °C [77 °F], 100 kPa). verify (what is ?) Infobox references

Zinc chlorate (Zn(ClO_{3})_{2}) is an inorganic chemical compound.
