= Caesium phosphate =

Chemical compound

Names
- IUPAC name Caesium phosphate
- Other names Cesium phosphate

Identifiers
CAS Number	17893-64-0
3D model (JSmol)	Interactive image
ChemSpider	8002785
EC Number	627-052-2
PubChem CID	9827043
CompTox Dashboard (EPA)	DTXSID80431378
- InChI: InChI=1S/3Cs.H3O4P/c;;;1-5(2,3)4/h;;;(H3,1,2,3,4)/q3*+1;/p-3 Key: CPWJKGIJFGMVPL-UHFFFAOYSA-K
- SMILES: [O-]P(=O)([O-])[O-].[Cs+].[Cs+].[Cs+]

Properties
Chemical formula	Cs_{3}PO_{4}
Molar mass	493.69 g/mol

Hazards
- GHS labelling
Pictograms	(GHS07: Exclamation mark)
Signal word	Warning
Hazard statements	H315, H317, H319, H335
Precautionary statements	P261, P264, P271, P280, P302+P352, P304+P340, P305+P351+P338, P312, P321, P332+P313, P337+P313, P362, P403+P233, P405, P501
- Except where otherwise noted, data are given for materials in their standard state (at 25 °C [77 °F], 100 kPa). Infobox references

Caesium phosphate, Cs_{3}PO_{4}, is a phosphate of caesium that is highly soluble in water.

== Use ==
Caesium phosphate can be used as an n-dopant to enhance the conductivity of the electron transport layer in organic light-emitting diodes.

== Related compounds ==
Several caesium hydrogen phosphates (Cs_{x}H_{y}(PO_{4})_{z}·nH_{2}O) have been characterized.

Several mixed phosphates such as caesium–manganese phosphate (CsMnPO_{4}), caesium–cobalt phosphate (CsCoPO_{4}), and caesium–magnesium phosphate (CsMgPO_{4}) also exist.
