= Ammonium dihydrogen arsenate =

Names
- IUPAC name arsoric acid;azane
- Other names Ammonium hydrogen arsenate

Identifiers
CAS Number	13462-93-6
3D model (JSmol)	Interactive image
ChemSpider	145946
ECHA InfoCard	100.033.320
EC Number	236-667-1
PubChem CID	121233660
UNII	0KYL9Q413A
CompTox Dashboard (EPA)	DTXSID0065480
- InChI: InChI=1S/AsH3O4.H3N/c2-1(3,4)5;/h(H3,2,3,4,5);1H3 Key: VTWJXWNBCACAAK-UHFFFAOYSA-N
- SMILES: [As](=O)(O)(O)O.N

Properties
Chemical formula	AsH_{6}NO_{4}
Molar mass	158.973 g·mol^{−1}
Appearance	colorless crystals
Density	2.34 g/mL
Melting point	300
Solubility in water	soluble

Hazards
- GHS labelling
Signal word	Danger
- Except where otherwise noted, data are given for materials in their standard state (at 25 °C [77 °F], 100 kPa). Infobox references

Ammonium dihydrogen arsenate is an inorganic chemical compound with the chemical formula NH_{4}H_{2}AsO_{4}.

== Synthesis ==
The effect of ammonia on a concentrated solution of arsenic acid:

NH_{3} + H_{3}AsO_{4} → NH_{4}H_{2}AsO_{4}

== Physical properties ==
The compound forms colorless crystals, soluble in water.

== Uses ==
The compound is used as a pharmaceutical intermediate.

Ferroelectric, a material of nonlinear optics.
