= Thallium(I) oxalate =

Names
- Other names Thallous oxalate

Identifiers
CAS Number	30737-24-7
CompTox Dashboard (EPA)	DTXSID90952963

Properties
Chemical formula	Tl_{2}C_{2}O_{4}
Molar mass	496.79 g/mol
Appearance	Colorless to white crystalline solid
Density	6.31 g/cm^{3}
Solubility in water	Slightly soluble in water
- Except where otherwise noted, data are given for materials in their standard state (at 25 °C [77 °F], 100 kPa). Infobox references

Thallium(I) oxalate is an inorganic compound of thallium in the +1 oxidation state and the oxalate ion, with the formula Tl_{2}C_{2}O_{4}. It is a colorless to white crystalline solid and is only slightly soluble in water.

== Preparation ==
Thallium(I) oxalate can be prepared by reaction of thallium(I) carbonate with oxalic acid in aqueous solution:

Tl_{2}CO_{3} + H_{2}C_{2}O_{4} → Tl_{2}C_{2}O_{4} + CO_{2}↑ + H_{2}O

This reaction has also been used in crystallographic studies of thallium(I) oxalate derivatives.

Thallium(I) oxalate has also been obtained as a product of redox chemistry in the Tl_{2}O_{3}–HCN/CN^{−}–H_{2}O system. In one study, prolonged reaction of thallium(III) oxide with hydrocyanic acid at about 70 °C produced transparent crystals of Tl_{2}C_{2}O_{4}.

== Properties ==
=== Structure ===
The crystal structure of Tl_{2}C_{2}O_{4} has been determined by single-crystal X-ray diffraction. The crystal system is monoclinic with space group P2_{1}/c. Lattice parameters are a=6.6141 b=5.8404 c=6.6620Å and β=99.22°. The unit cell volume is 254.02Å^{3}. The calculated density is 6.495 Mg/m^{3}.

The compound contains planar oxalate anions and irregularly coordinated Tl^{+} ions. The coordination geometry around thallium is strongly influenced by the stereochemically active 6s^{2} lone pair characteristic of Tl(I).

A later crystallographic study of the related adduct Tl_{2}C_{2}O_{4}·H_{2}C_{2}O_{4} likewise found highly irregular oxygen coordination around Tl(I), with nine oxygen atoms within about 3.25 Å.

=== Solubility ===
Thallium(I) oxalate is only slightly soluble in water. A solubility of about 1.8 g per 100 g of water at room temperature has been tabulated.

=== Thermal decomposition ===
On heating, thallium(I) oxalate decomposes rather than boiling. Older thermal studies place decomposition in the approximate range 315–320 °C.

The decomposition can be represented overall as formation of thallium(I) oxide and gaseous carbon oxides. Thermal studies of thallium oxalates show Tl_{2}C_{2}O_{4} as a stable intermediate below about 290 °C in decomposition sequences of thallium(III) oxalato compounds.

=== Oxalic acid adduct ===
Reaction of thallium(I) carbonate with a twofold molar excess of oxalic acid does not necessarily give simple thallium hydrogen oxalate. Instead, the crystalline adduct Tl_{2}C_{2}O_{4}·H_{2}C_{2}O_{4} can form.

This compound crystallizes in the monoclinic space group P2_{1}/a with a = 6.2891 Å, b = 6.3974 Å, c = 10.3618 Å, β = 94.526°, and Z = 2. The oxalate ion and oxalic acid molecule are both planar and linked by strong O–H···O hydrogen bonds into polymeric chains.

== Safety ==
Thallium(I) oxalate is highly toxic because of the toxicity of soluble and bioavailable thallium(I) compounds. Contact and ingestion should be avoided.
