= Ximengite =

Phosphate mineral

General
- Category: Phosphate minerals
- Formula: BiPO_{4}
- IMA symbol: Xim
- Strunz classification: 8.AD.45
- Crystal system: Trigonal
- Crystal class: Trapezohedral (32); H-M symbol: (32)
- Space group: P3_{1}21 or P3_{2}21

Identification
- Formula mass: 303.95 g/mol
- Color: Colorless
- Mohs scale hardness: 4.5
- Luster: Vitreous - Greasy
- Diaphaneity: Transparent
- Specific gravity: 5.53

Ximengite is a phosphate mineral discovered in and named for the Ximeng tin-mining district in China. Chemically, it is bismuth phosphate, BiPO_{4}.
