= Lanthanum(III) selenate =

Names
- Other names Lanthanum selenate

Identifiers
3D model (JSmol)	Interactive image
ChemSpider	29317332
PubChem CID	162115434
- InChI: InChI=1S/2La.3H2O4Se/c;;3*1-5(2,3)4/h;;3*(H2,1,2,3,4)/q2*+3;;;/p-6 Key: ZGRWYCFPZBBSHR-UHFFFAOYSA-H
- SMILES: O=[Se](=O)([O-])[O-].O=[Se](=O)([O-])[O-].O=[Se](=O)([O-])[O-].[La+3].[La+3]

Properties
Chemical formula	La_{2}(SeO_{4})_{3}
Molar mass	706.68 g/mol
Appearance	Colorless to white crystals (hydrates)
Solubility in water	Soluble in water
- Except where otherwise noted, data are given for materials in their standard state (at 25 °C [77 °F], 100 kPa). Infobox references

Lanthanum(III) selenate is an inorganic compound of lanthanum and the selenate ion, with the chemical formula La_{2}(SeO_{4})_{3}. Several hydrates are known, including the pentahydrate and dodecahydrate.

== Preparation ==
Lanthanum(III) selenate can be prepared by dissolving lanthanum(III) oxide, hydroxide or carbonate in selenic acid. For example:

La_{2}O_{3} + 3 H_{2}SeO_{4} → La_{2}(SeO_{4})_{3} + 3 H_{2}O

and

La_{2}(CO_{3})_{3} + 3 H_{2}SeO_{4} → La_{2}(SeO_{4})_{3} + 3 CO_{2}↑ + 3 H_{2}O

Crystallization from aqueous solution gives hydrated lanthanum selenates.

== Properties ==
Lanthanum(III) selenate is readily soluble in cold water. Its solubility decreases strongly with increasing temperature, a behaviour characteristic of several rare-earth selenates.

Several crystalline hydrates have been reported. Older literature describes compositions containing 5, 6, 10 and 12 water molecules per formula unit. The pentahydrate, La_{2}(SeO_{4})_{3}·5H_{2}O, has been studied by thermal analysis and is an important hydrated phase.

The dodecahydrate, La_{2}(SeO_{4})_{3}·12H_{2}O, crystallizes in the monoclinic crystal system, in space group C2/c (No. 15). Its lattice parameters are a = 10.670(2) Å, b = 20.390(6) Å, c = 10.740(2) Å and β = 110.12(2)°.

Lanthanum differs from the heavier rare-earth elements in that the dodecahydrate is particularly characteristic; most heavier rare-earth selenates more commonly form octahydrates.

=== Thermal decomposition ===
On heating, hydrated lanthanum selenate first loses its water of crystallization. The pentahydrate has been studied by thermogravimetric and differential thermal analysis, which show stepwise dehydration followed by decomposition of the anhydrous selenate at higher temperature.

Further heating ultimately converts the selenate into lower selenium oxyanion intermediates and finally lanthanum(III) oxide.

Hydrated lanthanum selenate also forms double salts with alkali-metal selenates; their thermal decomposition has been studied up to about 1300 °C.
