= Ammonium selenate =

Names
- IUPAC name diazanium;selenate
- Other names Diammonium selenate

Identifiers
CAS Number	7783-21-3
3D model (JSmol)	Interactive image
ChemSpider	145166
ECHA InfoCard	100.029.077
EC Number	231-985-7
PubChem CID	165640
UNII	02E09D6S55
CompTox Dashboard (EPA)	DTXSID40889578
- InChI: InChI=1S/H8N2O4Se/c1-5-7(3,4)6-2/h1-2H4 Key: HSQMXXJIBPJBCG-UHFFFAOYSA-N
- SMILES: [NH4+].[NH4+].[O-][Se](=O)(=O)[O-]

Properties
Chemical formula	H_{8}N_{2}O_{4}Se
Molar mass	179.045 g·mol^{−1}
Appearance	white crystals
Density	2.194 g/cm^{3}
Solubility in water	soluble
- Except where otherwise noted, data are given for materials in their standard state (at 25 °C [77 °F], 100 kPa). Infobox references

Ammonium selenate is a chemical compound with the chemical formula (NH_{4})_{2}SeO_{4}.

== Synthesis ==
Synthesis is via a reaction of selenic acid with an excess of ammonium hydroxide.

It may also be formed by the effect of an ammonia solution on a solution of selenic acid:

2NH_{3} + H_{2}SeO_{4} → (NH_{4})_{2}SeO_{4}

== Physical properties ==
Ammonium selenate forms white crystals of monoclinic system, spatial group C2/m, cell parameters a = 12.152, b = 6.418, c = 7.711, β = 115.5° Z = 4 and density 2.190 Mgm^{−3}.

It is easily soluble in water. Soluble in EtOH and acetone.
