= Cerium(III) phosphate =

Chemical compound

Names
- IUPAC name Cerium phosphate
- Other names: Cerium monophosphate; Cerium orthophosphate

Identifiers
CAS Number	13454-71-2
3D model (JSmol)	Interactive image
ChemSpider	140393
ECHA InfoCard	100.033.293
EC Number	236-637-8
PubChem CID	159673
UNII	XR1Z4BIW2J
CompTox Dashboard (EPA)	DTXSID10928665
- InChI: InChI=1S/Ce.H3O4P/c;1-5(2,3)4/h;(H3,1,2,3,4)/q+3;/p-3 Key: TYAVIWGEVOBWDZ-UHFFFAOYSA-K
- SMILES: [O-]P(=O)([O-])[O-].[Ce+3]

Properties
Chemical formula	CePO_{4}
Molar mass	235.09 g/mol
Appearance	Dark yellow powder
Odor	Odorless
Density	5.22 g/mL
Solubility in water	Insoluble
- Except where otherwise noted, data are given for materials in their standard state (at 25 °C [77 °F], 100 kPa). Infobox references

Cerium phosphate, with the molecular formula CePO_{4}, is a phosphate of cerium, the second lanthanide. It is usually found as an odorless, dark yellow powder which is insoluble in water.

== Synthesis ==
Cerium phosphate can be synthesized using the hydrothermal reaction of Ce(NO_{3})_{3} and (NH_{4})_{2}HPO_{4} at 180°C followed by calcination at 900°C.
