= Samarium(III) acetate =

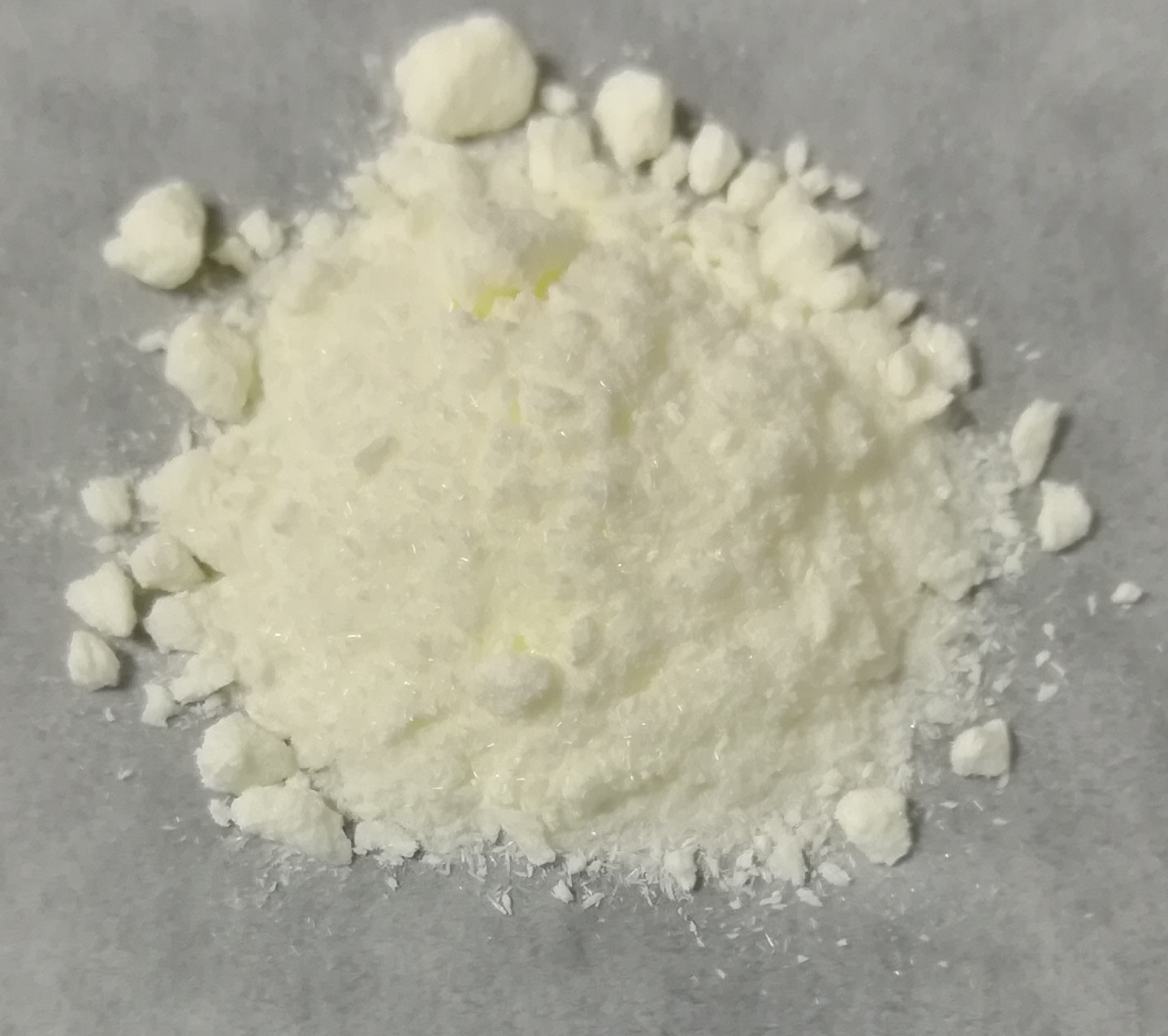

Names
- Other names Samarium ethanoate

Identifiers
CAS Number	10465-27-7 anhydrous; hydrate: 100587-91-5; tetrahydrate: 15280-52-1
3D model (JSmol)	Interactive image; hydrate: Interactive image; tetrahydrate: Interactive image
ChemSpider	23630; hydrate: 24590743
EC Number	233-950-1
PubChem CID	25297; hydrate: 71311371; tetrahydrate: 91886557
CompTox Dashboard (EPA)	DTXSID60890661
- InChI: InChI=1S/3C2H4O2.Sm/c3*1-2(3)4;/h3*1H3,(H,3,4);/q;;;+3/p-3 Key: JPDBEEUPLFWHAJ-UHFFFAOYSA-K; hydrate: InChI=1S/3C2H4O2.H2O.Sm/c3*1-2(3)4;;/h3*1H3,(H,3,4);1H2;/q;;;;+3/p-3 Key: LKSVMAKMHXTSQX-UHFFFAOYSA-K; tetrahydrate: InChI=1S/3C2H4O2.4H2O.Sm/c3*1-2(3)4;;;;;/h3*1H3,(H,3,4);4*1H2; Key: NIVHQHOGEFRWEZ-UHFFFAOYSA-N
- SMILES: CC(=O)[O-].CC(=O)[O-].CC(=O)[O-].[Sm+3]; hydrate: CC(=O)[O-].CC(=O)[O-].CC(=O)[O-].O.[Sm+3]; tetrahydrate: CC(=O)[O-].CC(=O)[O-].CC(=O)[O-].O.O.O.O.[Sm+3]

Properties
Chemical formula	Sm(CH_{3}COO)_{3}
Molar mass	327.492 (anhydrous); 345.51 (hydrate)
Appearance	pale yellow powder
Density	1.94 g·cm^{−3}

Hazards
- GHS labelling
Pictograms	(GHS07: Exclamation mark)
Signal word	Warning
Hazard statements	H315, H319, H335
Precautionary statements	P261, P264, P264+P265, P271, P280, P302+P352, P304+P340, P305+P351+P338, P319, P321, P332+P317, P337+P317, P362+P364, P403+P233, P405, P501
- Except where otherwise noted, data are given for materials in their standard state (at 25 °C [77 °F], 100 kPa). Infobox references

Samarium(III) acetate is an acetate salt of samarium, with the chemical formula of Sm(CH_{3}COO)_{3}. It exists in the hydrate and tetrahydrate form. Its tetrahydrate can be obtained by dissolving samarium(III) oxide in 50% acetic acid solution, crystallizing and vacuum drying. The mixed anion acetate [Sm(CH_{3}COO)(H_{2}O)_{6}]Cl_{2}·H_{2}O and [Sm(CH_{3}COO)_{2}(H_{2}O)_{3}]Cl can be crystallized from SmCl_{3}·6H_{2}O and SmOCl in acetic acid solution respectively.
