= Uranyl formate =

Identifiers
CAS Number	16984-59-1
3D model (JSmol)	Interactive image
ChemSpider	78394
ECHA InfoCard	100.037.315
PubChem CID	86897
- InChI: InChI=1S/2CH2O2.2O.U/c2*2-1-3;;;/h2*1H,(H,2,3);;; Key: SFIHWLKHBCDNCE-UHFFFAOYSA-N
- SMILES: O=CO.O=CO.O=[U]=O

Properties
Chemical formula	(UO_{2}(CHO_{2})_{2}·H_{2}O)
Molar mass	378.08 g/mol
Appearance	fine yellow powder
Melting point	110 °C (230 °F; 383 K)
- Except where otherwise noted, data are given for materials in their standard state (at 25 °C [77 °F], 100 kPa). verify (what is ?) Infobox references

Uranyl formate (UO_{2}(CHO_{2})_{2}·H_{2}O) is a salt that exists as a fine yellow free-flowing powder occasionally used in transmission electron microscopy.

It is used as a negative stain in transmission electron microscopy (TEM) because it exhibits a finer grain structure than uranyl acetate. However, uranyl formate does not easily dissolve, and once in solution, it has a limited lifespan as a stain. Typical aqueous solution concentrations are 0.5% or 1%. It is highly sensitive to light, especially ultraviolet light, and will precipitate upon exposure.

== See also ==
- Electron microscope
