= Mercury(I) carbonate =

Names
- IUPAC name Mercury(I) carbonate
- Other names: Mercurous carbonate

Identifiers
CAS Number	6824-78-8
3D model (JSmol)	Interactive image
ChemSpider	129549488
PubChem CID	87545972
- InChI: InChI=1S/CH2O3.2Hg/c2-1(3)4;;/h(H2,2,3,4);;/q;2*+1/p-2 Key: OFLBFFWZLSHZSP-UHFFFAOYSA-L
- SMILES: C(=O)([O-])[O-].[Hg+].[Hg+]

Properties
Chemical formula	Hg_{2}CO_{3}
Molar mass	461.19 g/mol
Appearance	White to yellowish-brown solid
Melting point	Decomposes 130 °C (266 °F; 403 K)
Solubility in water	Practically insoluble in water and ethanol
Solubility	Soluble in aqueous ammonium chloride solution

Hazards
- Occupational safety and health (OHS/OSH)
Main hazards	Highly toxic; dangerous for the environment
- GHS labelling
Hazard statements	H300, H310, H330, H373, H410
- Except where otherwise noted, data are given for materials in their standard state (at 25 °C [77 °F], 100 kPa). Infobox references

Mercury(I) carbonate is a chemical compound of mercury belonging to the group of carbonates.

== Preparation ==
Mercury(I) carbonate is formed by precipitation of potassium carbonate or sodium carbonate with mercury(I) nitrate. A dirty white precipitate is produced, which soon turns black in the presence of excess precipitating agent, especially upon heating.

Hg_{2}(NO_{3})_{2} + K_{2}CO_{3} → Hg_{2}CO_{3} + 2 KNO_{3}

== Properties ==
Mercury(I) carbonate is a white to yellowish-brown solid. It is practically insoluble in water and ethanol, but soluble in aqueous ammonium chloride solution. The compound decomposes at approximately 130 °C.
