= Praseodymium(III) molybdate =

Identifiers
3D model (JSmol)	Interactive image
- InChI: InChI=1S/2Pr.3Mo.12O/q2*+3;;;;;;;;;;6*-1 Key: BVFZSWQSIJJNQM-UHFFFAOYSA-N
- SMILES: [Pr+3].[Pr+3].[O-][Mo](=O)(=O)[O-].[O-][Mo]([O-])(=O)=O.[O-][Mo]([O-])(=O)=O

Properties
Chemical formula	Pr_{2}(MoO_{4})_{3}
Appearance	green crystals
Density	4.84 g/cm^{3}
Melting point	1030 °C
Solubility in water	insoluble
- Except where otherwise noted, data are given for materials in their standard state (at 25 °C [77 °F], 100 kPa). Infobox references

Praseodymium(III) molybdate is a salt of praseodymium and molybdic acid with the chemical formula Pr_{2}(MoO_{4})_{3}. It forms crystals that are insoluble in water.

== Physical properties ==
Praseodymium(III) molybdate crystallizes in the monoclinic crystal system, superspace group I_{2}/b(αβ0)00, cell parameters a = 0.530284 nm, b = 0.532699 nm, c = 1.17935 nm and β = 90.163°. Several phase transitions occur in crystals at temperatures of 235 and 987 °C.
