= Magnesium formate =

Names
- IUPAC name Magnesium diformate

Identifiers
CAS Number	557-39-1; 6150-82-9 (dihydrate)
3D model (JSmol)	Interactive image
ChemSpider	61687
ECHA InfoCard	100.008.341
EC Number	209-173-9
PubChem CID	68404
UNII	3B917PAF9I; 3Z0F17XFMN (dihydrate)
CompTox Dashboard (EPA)	DTXSID3060320
- InChI: InChI=1S/2CH2O2.Mg/c2*2-1-3;/h2*1H,(H,2,3);/q;;+2/p-2 Key: GMDNUWQNDQDBNQ-UHFFFAOYSA-L
- SMILES: C(=O)[O-].C(=O)[O-].[Mg+2]

Properties
Chemical formula	Mg(HCO_{2})_{2}
Solubility in water	14 g/100g at 0 °C 14.4 g/100g at 20 °C; 20.5 g/100g at 80 °C
- Except where otherwise noted, data are given for materials in their standard state (at 25 °C [77 °F], 100 kPa). Infobox references

Magnesium formate is a magnesium salt of formic acid. It is an inorganic compound. It consists of a magnesium cation and formate anion. It can be prepared by reacting magnesium oxide with formic acid. The dihydrate is formed when crystallizing from the solution. The dihydrate dehydrates at 105 °C to form anhydrate, then decomposes at 500 °C to produce magnesium oxide. Magnesium formate can be used for organic syntheses.
