= Cadmium selenate =

Identifiers
| CAS Number | 13814-62-5 anhydrous; 20861-74-9 monohydrate; 10060-09-0 dihydrate |
| 3D model (JSmol) | Interactive image |
| ChemSpider | 146042 |
| ECHA InfoCard | 100.034.060 |
| EC Number | 237-481-3 |
| PubChem CID | 166912 |
| UNII | 3U4HEE3NCC |
| CompTox Dashboard (EPA) | DTXSID60884646 |
- InChI: InChI=1S/Cd.H2O4Se/c;1-5(2,3)4/h;(H2,1,2,3,4)/q+2;/p-2 Key: VTFKXHQTGNWIJW-UHFFFAOYSA-L
- SMILES: [Cd+2].[O-][Se](=O)(=O)[O-]

Properties
| Chemical formula | CdO_{4}Se |
| Molar mass | 255.381 g·mol^{−1} |
| Appearance | colourless solid (dihydrate) |
| Density | 3.62 g·cm^{−3} (dihydrate) |
| Melting point | 100 °C (dihydrate decomposes) |
| Solubility in water | 70.5 g·l^{−1} |

Hazards
- GHS labelling
| Pictograms | (GHS06: Toxic) (GHS08: Health hazard) (GHS09: Environmental hazard) |
| Signal word | Warning |
| Hazard statements | H301, H331, H373, H410 |
| Precautionary statements | P260, P264, P270, P271, P273, P301+P316, P304+P340, P316, P319, P321, P330, P391, P403+P233, P405, P501 |

Related compounds
| Other anions | cadmium sulfate cadmium selenite |
| Other cations | zinc selenate mercury selenate |
- Except where otherwise noted, data are given for materials in their standard state (at 25 °C [77 °F], 100 kPa). Infobox references

Cadmium selenate is a selenate of cadmium, with the chemical formula CdSeO_{4}.

== Preparation ==
Cadmium selenate can be formed by the reaction of cadmium oxide and selenic acid. The product is a mixture of monohydrate and dihydrate.

CdO + H_{2}SeO_{4} → CdSeO_{4} + H_{2}O

== Properties ==
Cadmium selenate dihydrate is a colorless solid. At 100 °C, the dihydrate releases water of crystallization to form cadmium selenate monohydrate. The monohydrate is monoclinic with space group P2_{1}/c (no. 14), while the dihydrate is orthorhombic, with space group Pbca (no. 61).
