= Lead(II) iodate =

Lead(II) Iodate
Names
- IUPAC name diiodyloxylead
- Other names Lead(II) iodate

Identifiers
CAS Number	25659-31-8
3D model (JSmol)	Interactive image
Beilstein Reference	108301 (G)
ChemSpider	21173032
ECHA InfoCard	100.042.866
EC Number	247-168-3
PubChem CID	24884402
- InChI: Key: DRHWBADNSVQEGH-UHFFFAOYSA-L; InChI=1S/2HIO3.Pb/c2*2-1(3)4;/h2*(H,2,3,4);/q;;+2/p-2
- SMILES: [O-]I(=O)=O.[O-]I(=O)=O.[Pb+2]

Properties
Chemical formula	Pb(IO_{3})_{2}
Molar mass	557.01 g/mol
Appearance	white crystal powder
Density	6.5 g/cm^{3}
Melting point	300 °C (572 °F; 573 K)
Solubility in water	3.61·10^{−5} M
Solubility product (K_{sp})	3.69·10^{−13}
Magnetic susceptibility (χ)	−131·10^{−6} cm^{3}/mol

Structure
Crystal structure	orthorhombic

Thermochemistry
Std molar entropy (S^{⦵}_{298})	312.9632 J/(mol·K)
Std enthalpy of formation (Δ_{f}H^{⦵}_{298})	−495.3856 kJ/mol

Pharmacology
- Pharmacokinetics
Metabolism	Ingestion limit: 50 μg/m^{3}

Hazards
- Occupational safety and health (OHS/OSH)
Main hazards	oxidizer
- GHS labelling
Pictograms	(GHS03: Oxidizing) (GHS07: Exclamation mark) (GHS08: Health hazard) (GHS09: Environmental hazard)
Signal word	Danger
Hazard statements	H272, H302, H332, H360, H373, H410
Precautionary statements	P203, P210, P220, P260, P264, P270, P271, P273, P280, P301+P317, P304+P340, P317, P318, P319, P330, P370+P378, P391, P405, P501
- Except where otherwise noted, data are given for materials in their standard state (at 25 °C [77 °F], 100 kPa). Infobox references

Lead(II) iodate is an inorganic compound with the molecular formula Pb(IO_{3})_{2}. It is naturally found as heavy white powder.

== Production ==
One way to produce lead(II) iodate involves the reaction of lead nitrate with double moles of potassium iodate. Lead iodate can be precipitated precisely by simultaneous dropwise addition of equivalent solutions of lead nitrate and potassium iodate with water as a solvent at around 60 °C.

Pb(NO_{3})_{2}(aq) + KIO_{3}(aq) → KNO_{3}(aq) + Pb(IO_{3})_{2}(s)

Industrial mass production methods use a less precise method due to higher quantities of reactants. Many other group 1 elements can be used in place of potassium to add iodate to the reaction due to solubility of group 1 element iodates.

== Uses ==
One use for the compound lead(II) iodate is the volumetric determination of lead content in ore. The determination of lead content in a sample of ore begins with the precipitation and separation of lead as a sulfate. The solution of this lead sulfate product is then slightly acidified and the lead is precipitated out as lead(II) iodate out by adding potassium iodate. Lead(II) iodate can then be titrated in the presence of hydrochloric acid and chloroform to indicate the exact amount of lead that was dissolved from the original ore sample. In this chemical process lead(II) iodate is used to isolate the lead found in a sample of ore from other chemicals present so that it can be studied and quantitated effectively.

PbSO_{4}(aq) + KIO_{3}(aq) → K_{2}SO_{4}(aq) + Pb(IO_{3})_{2}(s)
