= Scandium oxalate =

Names
- Other names Scandium(III) oxalate

Identifiers
CAS Number	13419-51-7
3D model (JSmol)	Interactive image; hexahydrate: Interactive image
ECHA InfoCard	100.033.189
PubChem CID	166803; hexahydrate: 160225803
CompTox Dashboard (EPA)	DTXSID10890691
- InChI: InChI=1S/3C2H2O4.2Sc/c3*3-1(4)2(5)6;;/h3*(H,3,4)(H,5,6);;/q;;;2*+3/p-6 Key: OMMFSGNJZPSNEH-UHFFFAOYSA-H; hexahydrate: InChI=1S/3C2H2O4.6H2O.2Sc/c3*3-1(4)2(5)6;;;;;;;;/h3*(H,3,4)(H,5,6);6*1H2;;/q;;;;;;;;;2*+3/p-6 Key: PJTSHZLMOPXOIR-UHFFFAOYSA-H
- SMILES: [Sc+3].[Sc+3].[O-]C(=O)C(=O)[O-].[O-]C(=O)C(=O)[O-].[O-]C(=O)C(=O)[O-]; hexahydrate: C(=O)(C(=O)[O-])[O-].C(=O)(C(=O)[O-])[O-].C(=O)(C(=O)[O-])[O-].O.O.O.O.O.O.[Sc+3].[Sc+3]

Properties
Chemical formula	Sc_{2}(C_{2}O_{4})_{3}
Molar mass	353.97 g/mol
Appearance	Colorless to white crystals (hydrates)
Solubility in water	Slightly soluble in water
- Except where otherwise noted, data are given for materials in their standard state (at 25 °C [77 °F], 100 kPa). Infobox references

Scandium oxalate is an inorganic compound of scandium and the oxalate ion, with the formula Sc_{2}(C_{2}O_{4})_{3}. It forms several hydrates, of which the hexahydrate is particularly well characterized. On heating, scandium oxalate ultimately decomposes to scandium oxide.

== Preparation ==
Scandium oxalate hexahydrate can be precipitated by treating a dilute solution of a soluble scandium salt, such as scandium chloride, with excess oxalic acid at about 60 °C.

2 ScCl_{3} + 3 H_{2}C_{2}O_{4} + 6 H_{2}O

→ Sc_{2}(C_{2}O_{4})_{3}·6H_{2}O↓ + 6 HCl

Precipitation is not completely quantitative because scandium forms soluble oxalato complexes, especially in strongly acidic or alkaline solution and in the presence of alkali-metal or ammonium ions.

== Properties ==
=== Hydrates and structure ===
A number of hydrated scandium oxalates have been reported. Vickery described tri-, hexa- and octadecahydrates, with the hexahydrate being the normal product obtained by precipitation at moderate temperature. Thermal studies have additionally identified dodecahydrate and dihydrate phases.

The hexahydrate, Sc_{2}(C_{2}O_{4})_{3}·6H_{2}O, is more accurately described as [Sc_{2}(C_{2}O_{4})_{3}(H_{2}O)_{4}]·2H_{2}O. Its crystal structure consists of scandium–oxalate layers. Each Sc^{3+} ion is eight-coordinate, bonded to six oxygen atoms from three bidentate oxalate groups and to two water molecules, giving a distorted dodecahedral coordination environment.

=== Solubility and complex formation ===
Scandium oxalate is only slightly soluble in water; a solubility of about 60 mg/L was reported for the hydrated material. Its solubility increases in both acidic and alkaline solutions because of formation of soluble scandium oxalato complexes.

Complex anions containing scandium and oxalate are known in solution. Their formation explains why precipitation of scandium by oxalic acid is incomplete under some conditions.

The hexahydrate also absorbs ammonia. Ammonia can replace coordinated water to form ammine complexes represented as [Sc(NH_{3})_{6}]_{2}(C_{2}O_{4})_{3}.

=== Thermal decomposition ===
Scandium oxalate hydrates lose water stepwise on heating. Head and Holley identified the sequence involving dodecahydrate, hexahydrate, dihydrate and anhydrous scandium oxalate before formation of Sc_{2}O_{3}.

The anhydrous oxalate decomposes directly to scandium oxide; no definite scandium carbonate intermediate was detected. The principal gaseous products are carbon dioxide and carbon monoxide, with carbon dioxide produced in excess.
