= Gadolinium acetate =

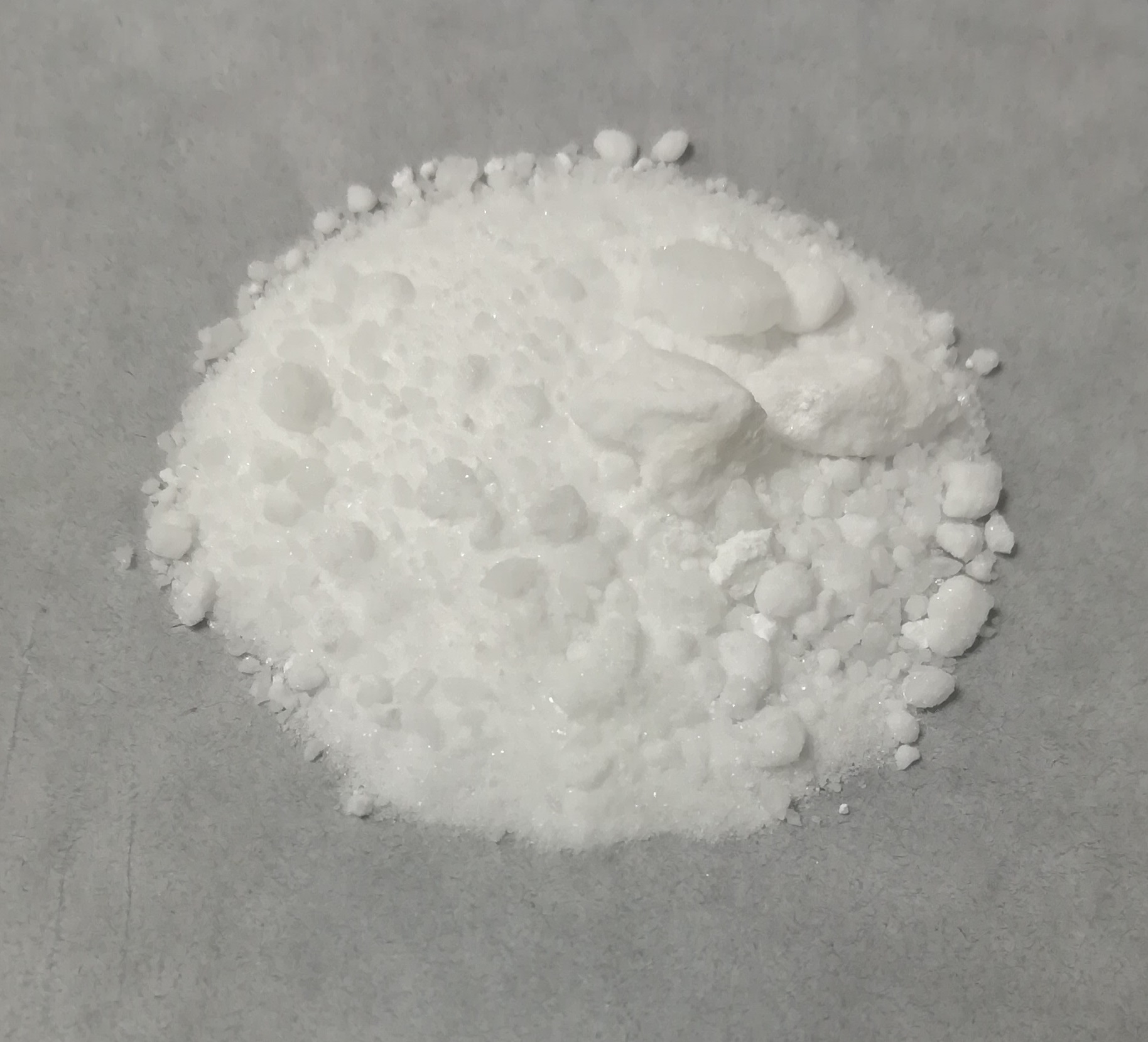

Names
- Other names Gadolinium ethanoate

Identifiers
CAS Number	31298-16-5
3D model (JSmol)	Interactive image
ChemSpider	140478
ECHA InfoCard	100.036.534
EC Number	240-204-9
PubChem CID	159771
CompTox Dashboard (EPA)	DTXSID80890769
- InChI: InChI=1S/3C2H4O2.Gd/c3*1-2(3)4;/h3*1H3,(H,3,4);/q;;;+3/p-3 Key: LYQGMALGKYWNIU-UHFFFAOYSA-K
- SMILES: CC(=O)[O-].CC(=O)[O-].CC(=O)[O-].[Gd+3]

Properties
Chemical formula	Gd(CH_{3}COO)_{3}
Appearance	colorless crystal or white powder
Density	1.611 g·cm^{−3} (tetrahydrate)
Solubility in water	0.116 g/mL (tetrahydrate)

Hazards
- GHS labelling
Pictograms	(GHS07: Exclamation mark)
Signal word	Warning
Hazard statements	H315, H319, H335
Precautionary statements	P261, P264, P264+P265, P271, P280, P302+P352, P304+P340, P305+P351+P338, P319, P321, P332+P317, P337+P317, P362+P364, P403+P233, P405, P501
- Except where otherwise noted, data are given for materials in their standard state (at 25 °C [77 °F], 100 kPa). Infobox references

Gadolinium acetate is the acetate salt of the lanthanide element gadolinium with the chemical formula Gd(CH_{3}COO)_{3}. It is a colorless crystal that is soluble in water and can form a hydrate. Its tetrahydrate has ground state ferromagnetism.

== Preparation ==
The tetrahydrate of gadolinium acetate can be crystallized from aqueous solution by reaction of gadolinium oxide and acetic acid:

Gd_{2}O_{3} + 6 HOAc + 5 H_{2}O → [(Gd(OAc)_{3}(H_{2}O)_{2})_{2}]·4H_{2}O

== Properties ==
The complex [Gd_{4}(CH_{3}COO)_{4}(acac)_{8}(H_{2}O)_{4}] can be obtained by the reflux reaction of gadolinium acetate and acetylacetone in the presence of triethylamine in methanol solution.
