= Cobalt(II) chlorate =

Names
- Other names cobaltous chlorate

Identifiers
CAS Number	80546-49-2
3D model (JSmol)	Interactive image
ChemSpider	14688171
PubChem CID	20034997
CompTox Dashboard (EPA)	DTXSID001027217
- InChI: InChI=1S/2ClHO3.Co/c2*2-1(3)4;/h2*(H,2,3,4);/q;;+2/p-2 Key: IQYVXTLKMOTJKI-UHFFFAOYSA-L; InChI=1S/2ClHO3.Co/c2*2-1(3)4;/h2*(H,2,3,4);/q;;+2/p-2 Key: IQYVXTLKMOTJKI-NUQVWONBAD; Key: IQYVXTLKMOTJKI-UHFFFAOYSA-L
- SMILES: [Co+2].[O-]Cl(=O)=O.[O-]Cl(=O)=O

Properties
Chemical formula	Co(ClO_{3})_{2}
Molar mass	225.9 g/mol
Appearance	deliquescent pink crystals
Melting point	50 °C (hexahydrate)
Solubility in water	soluble in water

Related compounds
Other cations	Nickel chlorate; Iron chlorate
- Except where otherwise noted, data are given for materials in their standard state (at 25 °C [77 °F], 100 kPa). verify (what is ?) Infobox references

Cobalt(II) chlorate is a chemical compound with the formula Co(ClO_{3})_{2}. It is an oxidant, as are all chlorates.

== Preparation ==
Cobalt(II) chlorate is formed by a double displacement reaction between cobalt(II) sulfate and barium chlorate, barium sulfate precipitates and cobalt chlorate can be crystallized out of the filtrate:

CoSO_{4} + Ba(ClO_{3})_{2} → BaSO_{4} + Co(ClO_{3})_{2}

It is also possible to make it by the reaction of any chlorate with a cobalt(II) salt, however the pure product is harder to separate.
