= Gallium chloride =

Gallium chloride may refer to:

- Gallium trichloride (gallium(III) chloride/digallium hexachloride), GaCl_{3}
- Gallium dichloride (gallium(I,III) chloride/digallium tetrachloride), GaCl_{2} (GaGaCl_{4})
- Gallium monochloride (gallium(I) chloride), GaCl
