= Cerium(III) acetate =

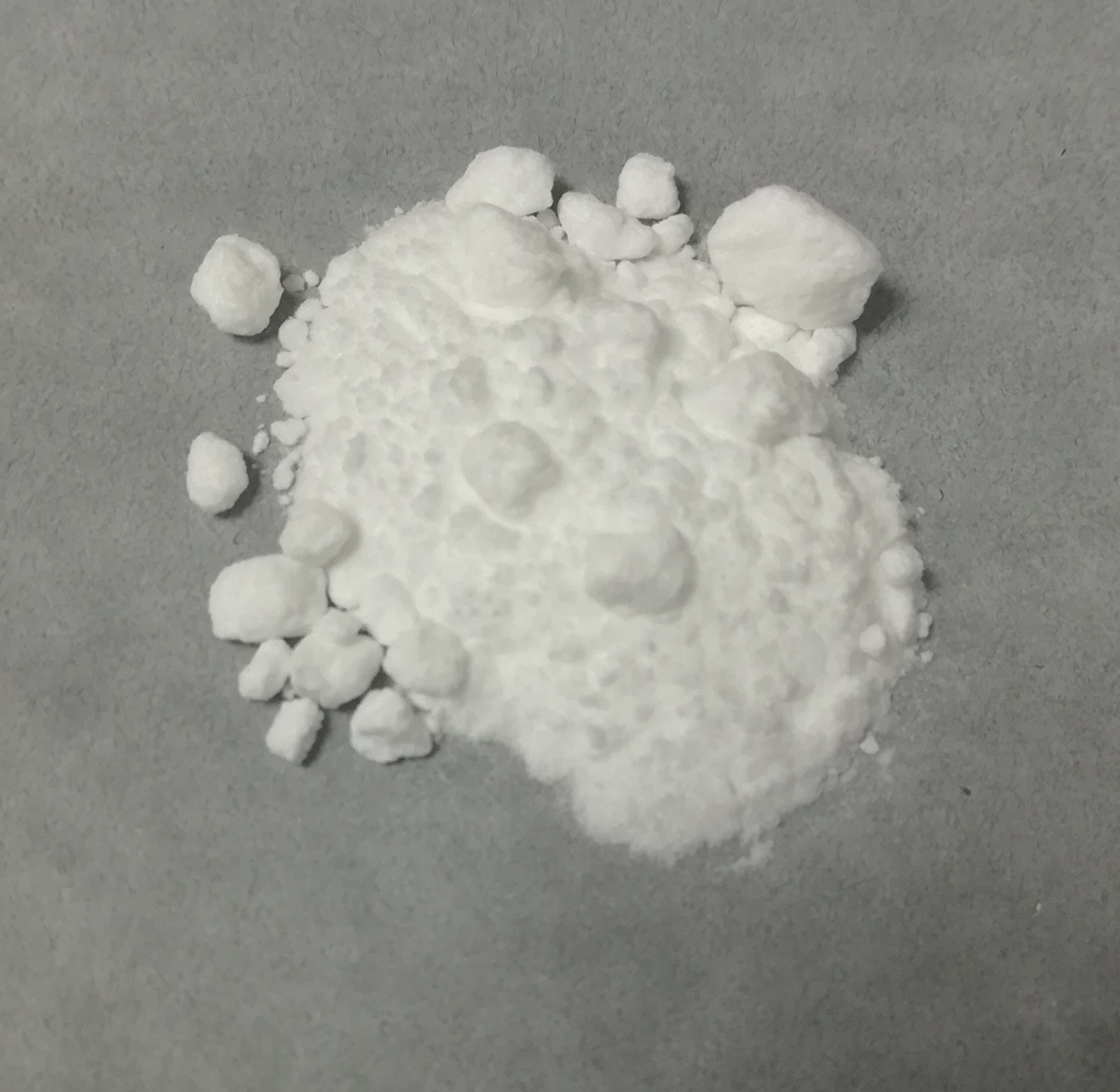

Names
- IUPAC name Cerium(III) acetate
- Other names Cerium triacetate Cerium acetate

Identifiers
CAS Number	anhydrous: 537-00-8; sesquihydrate: 206996-60-3
3D model (JSmol)	anhydrous: Interactive image; sesquihydrate: Interactive image
ChemSpider	anhydrous: 10369
ECHA InfoCard	100.007.869
EC Number	anhydrous: 208-654-0
PubChem CID	anhydrous: 10826; sesquihydrate: 22833299
UNII	anhydrous: YYB5291R2H; sesquihydrate: 779OQ1RB37
CompTox Dashboard (EPA)	anhydrous: DTXSID40939067 DTXSID2027179, DTXSID40939067
- InChI: InChI=1S/3C2H4O2.Ce/c3*1-2(3)4;/h3*1H3,(H,3,4);/q;;;+3/p-3 Key: VGBWDOLBWVJTRZ-UHFFFAOYSA-K; sesquihydrate: InChI=1S/6C2H4O2.2Ce.3H2O/c6*1-2(3)4;;;;;/h6*1H3,(H,3,4);;;3*1H2/q;;;;;;2*+3;;;/p-6 Key: FLEYCIHWCBGBLG-UHFFFAOYSA-H
- SMILES: anhydrous: CC(=O)[O-].CC(=O)[O-].CC(=O)[O-].[Ce+3]; sesquihydrate: CC(=O)[O-].CC(=O)[O-].CC(=O)[O-].[Ce+3].CC(=O)[O-].CC(=O)[O-].CC(=O)[O-].[Ce+3].O.O.O

Properties
Chemical formula	Ce(CH_{3}COO)_{3}
Molar mass	317.26
Appearance	white powder
Melting point	308°C

Hazards
- GHS labelling
Pictograms	(GHS07: Exclamation mark) (GHS09: Environmental hazard)
Signal word	Warning
Hazard statements	H315, H319, H335, H410
Precautionary statements	P261, P264, P264+P265, P271, P273, P280, P302+P352, P304+P340, P305+P351+P338, P305+P354+P338, P317, P319, P321, P332+P317, P337+P317, P362+P364, P391, P403+P233, P405, P501

Related compounds
Other cations	Lanthanum(III) acetate Praseodymium(III) acetate Neodymium acetate
- Except where otherwise noted, data are given for materials in their standard state (at 25 °C [77 °F], 100 kPa). Infobox references

Cerium acetate is an inorganic compound with the chemical formula of Ce(CH_{3}COO)_{3}. It is a white powder that is soluble in water. Its 1.5 hydrate loses water at 133°C to obtain an amorphous anhydrous form, and the amorphous phase changes to crystal at 212°C, and phase changes again at 286°C.

== Preparation ==
Cerium acetate can be prepared by reacting cerium(III) carbonate and 50% acetic acid in an aqueous solution:

Ce_{2}(CO_{3})_{3} + 6 CH_{3}COOH → 2 Ce(CH_{3}COO)_{3} + 3 H_{2}O + 3 CO_{2}↑

== Properties ==
Cerium acetate is soluble in water and ethanol in its anhydrous form (its hydrate is insoluble in ethanol), easily soluble in pyridine, and insoluble in acetone. Its thermal decomposition at 310 °C will generate basic cerium(III) acetate, which will be further decomposed to obtain Ce_{2}O_{2}CO_{3} (a basic carbonate), and continued heating generates cerium(IV) oxide (CeO_{2}) and carbon monoxide (CO).
