= Lanthanum(III) iodate =

Identifiers
CAS Number	13870-19-4
3D model (JSmol)	Interactive image
ChemSpider	20082411
ECHA InfoCard	100.034.187
EC Number	237-621-3
PubChem CID	15794045
CompTox Dashboard (EPA)	DTXSID70160761
- InChI: InChI=1S/3HIO3.La/c3*2-1(3)4;/h3*(H,2,3,4);/q;;;+3/p-3 Key: BULVJAIIOVREOT-UHFFFAOYSA-K
- SMILES: [O-]I(=O)=O.[O-]I(=O)=O.[O-]I(=O)=O.[La+3]

Properties
Chemical formula	La(IO_{3})_{3}
Molar mass	663.617
Appearance	colourless crystals
Solubility in water	1.07×10^{−3}mol·L^{−1}

Related compounds
Other anions	lanthanum(III) nitrate lanthanum(III) oxide
Other cations	cerium(III) iodate
- Except where otherwise noted, data are given for materials in their standard state (at 25 °C [77 °F], 100 kPa). Infobox references

Lanthanum(III) iodate is an inorganic compound with the chemical formula La(IO_{3})_{3}.

== Preparation ==
Lanthanum(III) iodate can be obtained by reacting a La^{3+} salt with potassium iodate or ammonium iodate and precipitating it:

La^{3+} + 3 IO_{3}^{−} → La(IO_{3})_{3}↓

== Properties ==
Lanthanum(III) iodate can disproportionate and decompose to a periodate when heated:

10 La(IO_{3})_{3} → 2 La_{5}(IO_{6})_{3} + 12 I_{2}↑ + 27 O_{2}↑
