= Yttrium(III) nitrate =

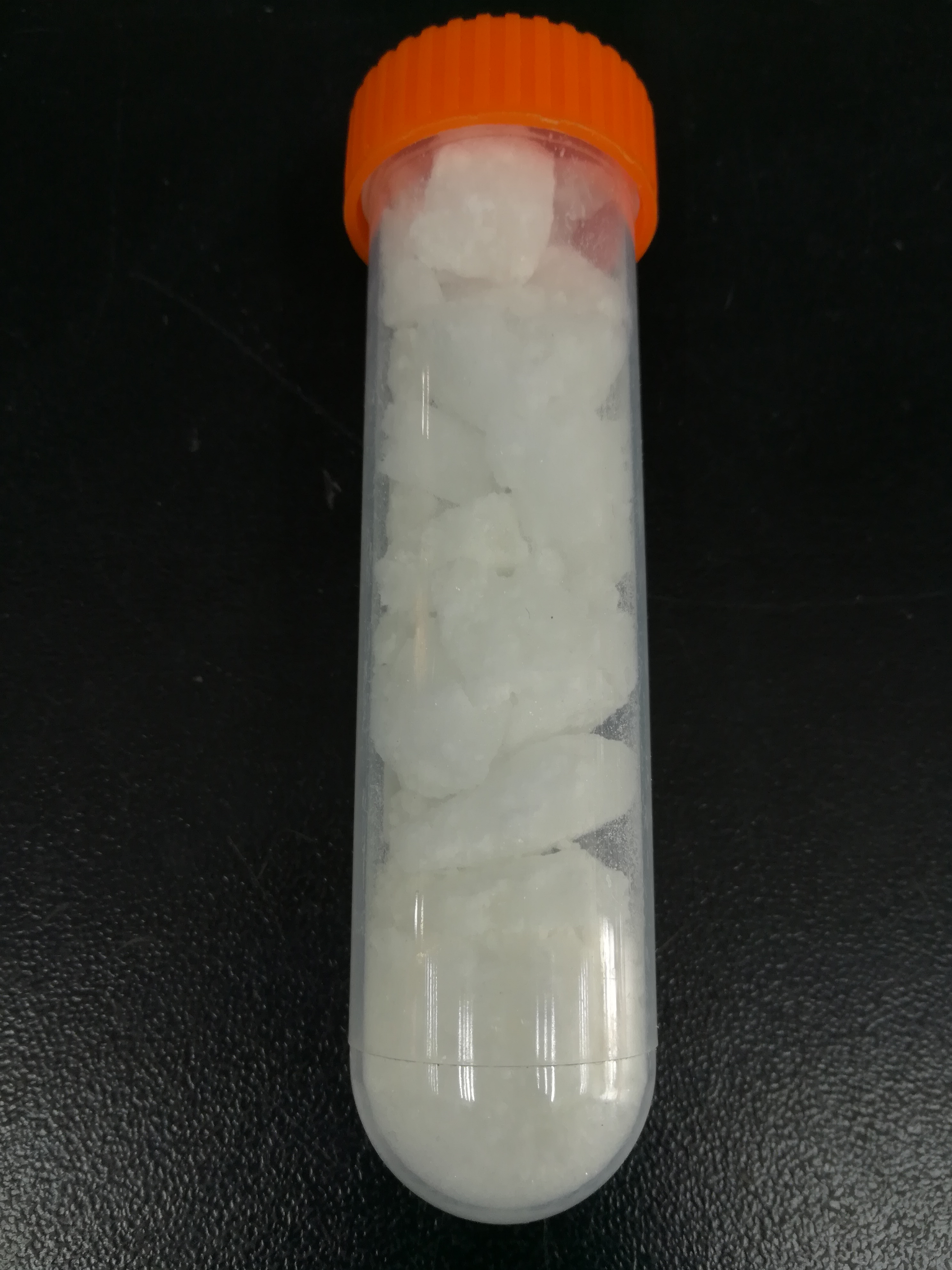

Names
- Other names Yttrium nitrate

Identifiers
CAS Number	anhydrous: 10361-93-0; hexahydrate: 13494-98-9
3D model (JSmol)	anhydrous: Interactive image
ECHA InfoCard	100.030.717
EC Number	anhydrous: 233-802-6
PubChem CID	anhydrous: 159283; hexahydrate: 166833
UNII	anhydrous: 0XR81865O4
CompTox Dashboard (EPA)	anhydrous: DTXSID70890657
- InChI: InChI=1S/3NO3.Y/c3*2-1(3)4;/q3*-1;+3 Key: BXJPTTGFESFXJU-UHFFFAOYSA-N
- SMILES: anhydrous: [N+](=O)([O-])[O-].[N+](=O)([O-])[O-].[N+](=O)([O-])[O-].[Y+3]

Properties
Chemical formula	Y(NO_{3})_{3}
Molar mass	274.927 g/mol
Appearance	Colorless crystals
Solubility in water	Soluble
- Except where otherwise noted, data are given for materials in their standard state (at 25 °C [77 °F], 100 kPa). Infobox references

Yttrium(III) nitrate is an inorganic compound, a salt with the formula Y(NO_{3})_{3}. The hexahydrate is the most common form commercially available.

== Preparation ==
Yttrium(III) nitrate can be prepared by dissolving corresponding metal oxide in 6 mol/L nitric acid:

Y_{2}O_{3} + 6 HNO_{3} → 2 Y(NO_{3})_{3} + 3 H_{2}O

== Properties ==
Yttrium(III) nitrate hexahydrate loses crystallized water at relatively low temperature. Upon further heating, basic salt YONO_{3} is formed. At 600 °C, the thermal decomposition is complete. Y_{2}O_{3} is the final product.

Y(NO_{3})_{3}·3TBP is formed when tributyl phosphate is used as the extracting solvent.

== Uses ==
Yttrium(III) nitrate is mainly used as a source of Y^{3+} cations. It is a precursor of some yttrium-containing materials, such as Y_{4}Al_{2}O_{9}, YBa_{2}Cu_{3}O_{6.5+x} and yttrium-based metal-organic frameworks. It can also be used as a catalyst in organic synthesis.
