= Caesium selenate =

caesium selenate
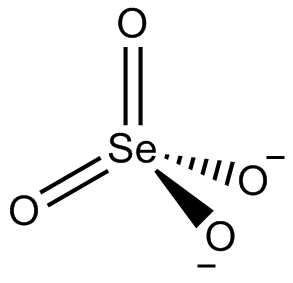

Identifiers
CAS Number	10326-29-1
3D model (JSmol)	Interactive image
ChemSpider	145356
ECHA InfoCard	100.030.635
EC Number	233-712-7
PubChem CID	165862
CompTox Dashboard (EPA)	DTXSID90889588
- InChI: InChI=1S/2Cs.H2O4Se/c;;1-5(2,3)4/h;;(H2,1,2,3,4)/q2*+1;/p-2 Key: GIIBVORKUMBCJK-UHFFFAOYSA-L
- SMILES: [O-][Se](=O)(=O)[O-].[Cs+].[Cs+]

Properties
Chemical formula	Cs_{2}SeO_{4}
Molar mass	408.77 g/mol
Appearance	colourless crystals
Solubility in water	insoluble
- Except where otherwise noted, data are given for materials in their standard state (at 25 °C [77 °F], 100 kPa). Infobox references

Caesium selanate is an inorganic compound, with the chemical formula of Cs_{2}SeO_{4}. It can form colourless crystals of the orthorhombic crystal system.

== Properties ==
Caesium selenate can precipitate compounds such as CsLiSeO_{4}·1/2H_{2}O and Cs_{4}LiH_{3}(SeO_{4})_{4} in Cs_{2}SeO_{4}-Li_{2}SeO_{4}-H_{2}O and its acidification system. It can also form double salts with other metals, such as Cs_{2}Mg(SeO_{4})_{2}·6H_{2}O, Cs_{2}Co(SeO_{4})_{2}·6H_{2}O, etc.

== Preparation ==
Caesium selenate can be obtained from the reaction of caesium carbonate and selenic acid solution:

Cs_{2}CO_{3} + H_{2}SeO_{4} → Cs_{2}SeO_{4} + H_{2}O + CO_{2}↑

Caesium selenate can also be prepared by the neutralization reaction of selenic acid and caesium hydroxide:

2 CsOH + H_{2}SeO_{4} → Cs_{2}SeO_{4} + 2 H_{2}O
