= Thorium(IV) selenate =

Identifiers
CAS Number	22995-92-2
3D model (JSmol)	Interactive image; octahydrate: Interactive image
PubChem CID	164180524
- InChI: InChI=1S/2H2O4Se.Th/c2*1-5(2,3)4;/h2*(H2,1,2,3,4);/q;;+4/p-4 Key: KFDASNGZTQPZMX-UHFFFAOYSA-J; octahydrate: InChI=1S/2H2O4Se.8H2O.Th/c2*1-5(2,3)4;;;;;;;;;/h2*(H2,1,2,3,4);8*1H2;/q;;;;;;;;;;+4/p-4 Key: GQVPIFSYRFSKJO-UHFFFAOYSA-J
- SMILES: [O-][Se](=O)(=O)[O-].[O-][Se](=O)(=O)[O-].[Th+4]; octahydrate: [O-][Se](=O)(=O)[O-].[O-][Se](=O)(=O)[O-].[Th+4].O.O.O.O.O.O.O.O

Properties
Chemical formula	Th(SeO_{4})_{2}
Molar mass	517.964
Solubility in water	0.5g/100g of water (10 °C)

Related compounds
Other anions	Thorium(IV) selenide Thorium(IV) sulfate
Other cations	Cerium(IV) selenide
- Except where otherwise noted, data are given for materials in their standard state (at 25 °C [77 °F], 100 kPa). Infobox references

Thorium(IV) selenate is an inorganic compound with the chemical formula Th(SeO_{4})_{2}. It exists in the octahydrate form and as a basic salt.

== Physical properties ==
Thorium(IV) selenate is a radioactive solid, slightly soluble in water, with a solubility of 0.5 g.
