= Scandium sulfate =

Chemical compound

Names
- IUPAC name Scandium(III) sulfate

Identifiers
| CAS Number | 13465-61-7 |
| 3D model (JSmol) | Interactive image |
| ChemSpider | 145951 |
| ECHA InfoCard | 100.033.351 |
| EC Number | 236-702-0 |
| PubChem CID | 166819 |
| CompTox Dashboard (EPA) | DTXSID70890697 |
- InChI: InChI=1S/3H2O4S.2Sc/c3*1-5(2,3)4;;/h3*(H2,1,2,3,4);;/q;;;2*+3/p-6 Key: QHYMYKHVGWATOS-UHFFFAOYSA-H
- SMILES: [O-]S(=O)(=O)[O-].[O-]S(=O)(=O)[O-].[O-]S(=O)(=O)[O-].[Sc+3].[Sc+3]

Properties
| Chemical formula | Sc_{2}(SO_{4})_{3} |
| Molar mass | 378.09 g mol^{−1} |
| Appearance | white hygroscopic crystals or powder |
| Solubility in water | soluble |

Hazards
- GHS labelling
| Pictograms | (GHS07: Exclamation mark) |
| Signal word | Warning |
| Hazard statements | H315, H319, H335 |
| Precautionary statements | P261, P264, P271, P280, P302+P352, P304+P340, P305+P351+P338, P312, P321, P332+P313, P337+P313, P362, P403+P233, P405, P501 |
| NFPA 704 (fire diamond) | 1 0 1 |
- Except where otherwise noted, data are given for materials in their standard state (at 25 °C [77 °F], 100 kPa). Infobox references

Scandium sulfate is the scandium salt of sulfuric acid and has the formula Sc_{2}(SO_{4})_{3}.
