= Cerium(III) hydroxide =

Names
- IUPAC name Cerium(III) hydroxide
- Other names Cerium trihydroxide Cerous hydroxide

Identifiers
CAS Number	15785-09-8
3D model (JSmol)	Interactive image
ChemSpider	76758
ECHA InfoCard	100.036.241
EC Number	239-881-3
PubChem CID	85102
CompTox Dashboard (EPA)	DTXSID9065942
- InChI: InChI=1S/Ce.3H2O/h;3*1H2/q+3;;;/p-3 Key: UNJPQTDTZAKTFK-UHFFFAOYSA-K
- SMILES: [Ce+3].[OH-].[OH-].[OH-]

Properties
Chemical formula	Ce(OH)_{3}
Molar mass	191.148 g/mol
Appearance	white crystals
Solubility in water	insoluble
Acidity (pK_{a})	32.8
- Except where otherwise noted, data are given for materials in their standard state (at 25 °C [77 °F], 100 kPa). Infobox references

Cerium(III) hydroxide is a hydroxide of the rare-earth metal cerium. It is a pale white powder with the chemical formula Ce(OH)_{3}.

== Preparation ==
Cerium(III) hydroxide is prepared by the reaction of water on cerium metal at 90 °C:

2 Ce + 6 H_{2}O → 2 Ce(OH)_{3}↓ + 3 H_{2}↑
