= Neodymium(III) selenate =

Names
- Other names Neodymium selenate

Identifiers
3D model (JSmol)	Interactive image; pentahydrate: Interactive image
ChemSpider	21428406
PubChem CID	25021978
- InChI: InChI=1S/2Nd.3H2O4Se/c;;3*1-5(2,3)4/h;;3*(H2,1,2,3,4)/q2*+3;;;/p-6 Key: SRZUMLBRLVPFMM-UHFFFAOYSA-H
- SMILES: [O-][Se](=O)(=O)[O-].[O-][Se](=O)(=O)[O-].[O-][Se](=O)(=O)[O-].[Nd+3].[Nd+3]; pentahydrate: O.O.O.O.O.[O-][Se](=O)(=O)[O-].[O-][Se](=O)(=O)[O-].[O-][Se](=O)(=O)[O-].[Nd+3].[Nd+3]

Properties
Chemical formula	Nd_{2}(SeO_{4})_{3}
Molar mass	717.39 g/mol
Appearance	Pink crystals (hydrates)
Solubility in water	Soluble in water
- Except where otherwise noted, data are given for materials in their standard state (at 25 °C [77 °F], 100 kPa). Infobox references

Neodymium(III) selenate is an inorganic compound of neodymium and the selenate ion, with the chemical formula Nd_{2}(SeO_{4})_{3}. Several hydrated forms are known, including the pentahydrate, octahydrate and dodecahydrate.

== Preparation ==
Neodymium(III) selenate can be prepared by dissolving neodymium(III) oxide in aqueous selenic acid:

Nd_{2}O_{3} + 3 H_{2}SeO_{4} → Nd_{2}(SeO_{4})_{3} + 3 H_{2}O

Concentration of the resulting solution at elevated temperature gives pink crystals of the pentahydrate, Nd_{2}(SeO_{4})_{3}·5H_{2}O.

Single crystals of the pentahydrate have also been obtained by dissolving Nd_{2}O_{3} in concentrated aqueous selenic acid and crystallizing the resulting solution.

== Properties ==
The pentahydrate forms pink crystals and is the thermodynamically stable neodymium selenate hydrate in contact with water at 25 °C.

Older work also identified an octahydrate and a dodecahydrate. The octahydrate can be obtained by adding a saturated neodymium selenate solution to excess ethanol, while the dodecahydrate forms initially on slow evaporation of saturated solution at room temperature. The dodecahydrate readily loses water to form the octahydrate.

The measured solubility of neodymium selenate decreases with increasing temperature. Reported values include approximately 45.2 g per 100 g water at 0 °C and about 39.9 g per 100 g water at 40 °C, although published solubility measurements show significant disagreement depending on hydrate composition and experimental method.

The OECD thermodynamic review considers Nd_{2}(SeO_{4})_{3}·5H_{2}O to be the stable phase at 298.15 K, but does not recommend a single solubility value because published measurements range from about 0.55 to 0.92 mol kg^{−1}.

=== Crystal structure ===
Neodymium(III) selenate pentahydrate crystallizes in the monoclinic crystal system, in space group P2_{1}/c (No. 14). Its lattice parameters at room temperature are approximately a = 10.629 Å, b = 13.98 Å and c = 9.752 Å, with β = 93.13° and four formula units per unit cell.

The structure contains Nd^{3+} ions linked to SeO_{4} tetrahedra and coordinated water molecules. Although its structural motifs resemble those of rare-earth sulfate pentahydrates, Nd_{2}(SeO_{4})_{3}·5H_{2}O is not isostructural with the corresponding neodymium sulfate hydrate.

== Related compounds ==
In concentrated selenic acid, neodymium can also form neodymium(III) hydrogen selenate, Nd(HSeO_{4})_{3}.

Double selenates containing neodymium are also known, including KNd(SeO_{4})_{2}, which contains layers built from NdO_{9} polyhedra decorated by SeO_{4} tetrahedra.
