= Plutonium(IV) iodate =

Names
- Other names Plutonium tetraiodate

Identifiers
CAS Number	13778-14-8
3D model (JSmol)	Interactive image
- InChI: InChI=1S/Pu.4HIO3/c;4*2-1(3)4/h;4*(H,2,3,4)/q+4;;;;/p-4 Key: KZCPVUXVUIMYAF-UHFFFAOYSA-J
- SMILES: [O-]I(=O)=O.[O-]I(=O)=O.[O-]I(=O)=O.[O-]I(=O)=O.[Pu+4]

Properties
Chemical formula	Pu(IO_{3})_{4}
Molar mass	943.61
Appearance	Green to brown transition depending on crystal angle
Density	6.074 g·cm^{−3}（−80 °C）
- Except where otherwise noted, data are given for materials in their standard state (at 25 °C [77 °F], 100 kPa). Infobox references

Plutonium(IV) iodate is an inorganic compound with the chemical formula Pu(IO_{3})_{4}, it is a salt which decomposes into plutonium(IV) oxide above 540 °C. It can be generated in the reaction of plutonium(IV) nitrate and iodic acid, but this method cannot obtain a pure product; Another preparation method is the reaction of plutonium(IV) nitrate or plutonium(IV) chloride with potassium iodate and dilute nitric acid. It can crystallize in the tetragonal crystal system with space group P4_{2}/n.
