= Thallium azide =

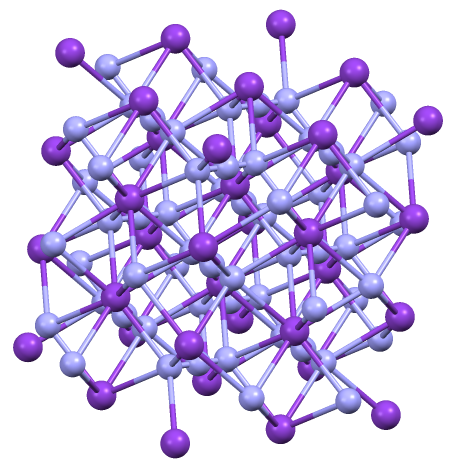

Names
- IUPAC name Thallium(I) azide
- Other names thallium azide

Identifiers
CAS Number	13847-66-0
3D model (JSmol)	Interactive image
ChemSpider	15368504
PubChem CID	22764821
CompTox Dashboard (EPA)	DTXSID00628243
- InChI: InChI=1S/N3.Tl/c1-3-2;/q-1;+1 Key: GMUSFHMEMWCQIE-UHFFFAOYSA-N; InChI=1/N3.Tl/c1-3-2;/q-1;+1 Key: GMUSFHMEMWCQIE-UHFFFAOYAP
- SMILES: [Tl+].[N-]=[N+]=[N-]

Properties
Chemical formula	TlN_{3}
Molar mass	246.40 g·mol^{−1}
Appearance	yellow-brown crystals
Solubility in water	insoluble

Structure
Crystal structure	Tetragonal, tI16
Space group	I4/mcm, No. 140

Hazards
- Occupational safety and health (OHS/OSH)
Main hazards	very toxic
- GHS labelling
Pictograms	(GHS01: Explosive) (GHS06: Toxic) (GHS08: Health hazard) (GHS09: Environmental hazard)
Signal word	Danger
NFPA 704 (fire diamond)	4 0 3
- Except where otherwise noted, data are given for materials in their standard state (at 25 °C [77 °F], 100 kPa). verify (what is ?) Infobox references

Thallium azide, TlN_{3}, is a yellow-brown crystalline solid poorly soluble in water. Although it is not nearly as sensitive to shock or friction as lead azide, it can easily be detonated by a flame or spark. It can be stored safely dry in a closed non-metallic container.

== Preparation and structure ==
Thallium azide can be prepared treating an aqueous solution of thallium(I) sulfate with sodium azide. Thallium azide will precipitate; the yield can be maximized by cooling.

TlN_{3}, KN_{3}, RbN_{3}, and CsN_{3} adopt the same structures. The azide is bound to eight cations in an eclipsed orientation. The cations are bound to eight terminal N centers.

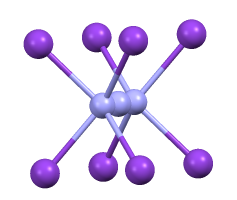
Coordination sphere of azide in KN_{3}, RbN_{3}, CsN_{3} and TlN_{3}.

== Safety ==
All thallium compounds are poisonous and should be handled with care. Azide salts are also roughly as toxic as their corresponding cyanide salts.
