= Magnesium benzoate =

Names
- Preferred IUPAC name Magnesium dibenzoate

Identifiers
CAS Number	553-70-8
3D model (JSmol)	Interactive image
ChemSpider	56159
ECHA InfoCard	100.008.224
PubChem CID	62371
UNII	K3J0WY6SYW
CompTox Dashboard (EPA)	DTXSID1044693
- InChI: InChI=1S/2C7H6O2.Mg/c2*8-7(9)6-4-2-1-3-5-6;/h2*1-5H,(H,8,9);/q;;+2/p-2 Key: PJJZFXPJNUVBMR-UHFFFAOYSA-L; InChI=1/2C7H6O2.Mg/c2*8-7(9)6-4-2-1-3-5-6;/h2*1-5H,(H,8,9);/q;;+2/p-2 Key: PJJZFXPJNUVBMR-NUQVWONBAR
- SMILES: [Mg+2].[O-]C(=O)c1ccccc1.[O-]C(=O)c1ccccc1

Properties
Chemical formula	C_{14}H_{10}MgO_{4}
Molar mass	266.53 g/mol
- Except where otherwise noted, data are given for materials in their standard state (at 25 °C [77 °F], 100 kPa). verify (what is ?) Infobox references

Magnesium benzoate is a chemical compound formed from magnesium and benzoic acid. It was once used to treat gout and arthritis.
