= Radium iodide =

Names
- Other names Radium diiodide

Identifiers
CAS Number	20610-52-0
3D model (JSmol)	Interactive image
- InChI: InChI=1S/2HI.Ra/h2*1H;/q;;+2/p-2 Key: VIUODKCIIYIXHC-UHFFFAOYSA-L
- SMILES: [I-].[I-].[Ra+2]

Properties
Chemical formula	RaI_{2}
Molar mass	480 g·mol^{−1}
Appearance	yellow solid
Density	5.83 g/cm^{3}
Solubility in water	soluble

Related compounds
Other anions	Radium fluoride; Radium chloride; Radium bromide
Other cations	Beryllium iodide; Magnesium iodide; Calcium iodide; Strontium iodide; Barium iodide; Zinc iodide; Cadmium iodide; Mercury(II) iodide
Related compounds	Hydrogen iodide; Lead(II) iodide
- Except where otherwise noted, data are given for materials in their standard state (at 25 °C [77 °F], 100 kPa). Infobox references

Radium iodide is an inorganic compound of radium and iodine with the chemical formula RaI_{2}. It is the radium salt of hydrogen iodide, consisting of radium cations Ra^{2+} and iodide anions I^{−}.

== Synthesis ==
The salt is synthesized by the reaction of radium carbonate with hydroiodic acid:

RaCO_{3} + 2 HI(aq) → RaI_{2} + H_{2}O + CO_{2}

== Properties ==
Radium iodide crystalises in the orthorhombic system with space group Pmcn. The unit cell has a = 9.22 b = 10.93 and c = 5.42 Å with 4 formulas per unit cell.
