= Barium fluoride =

Chemical compound

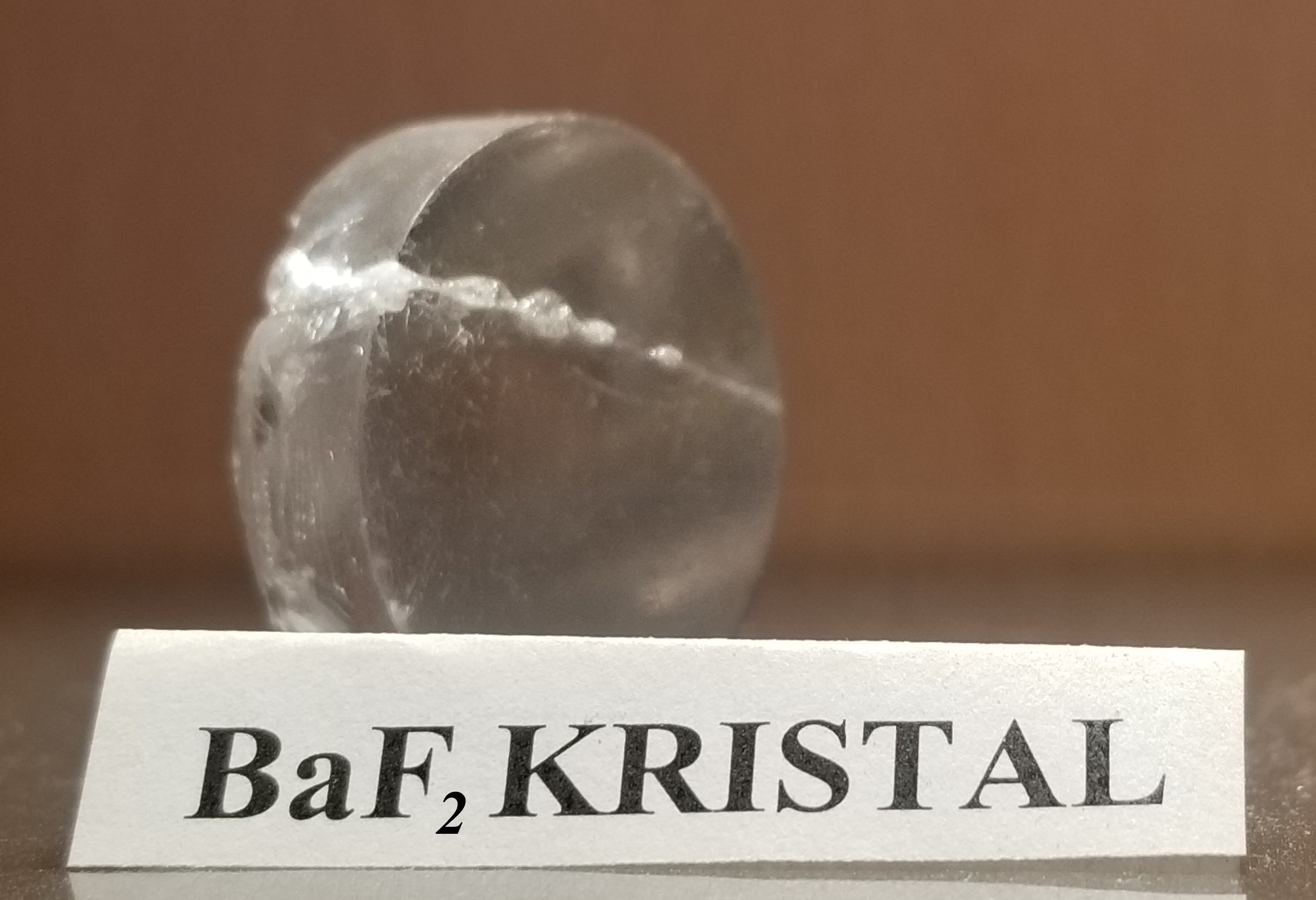

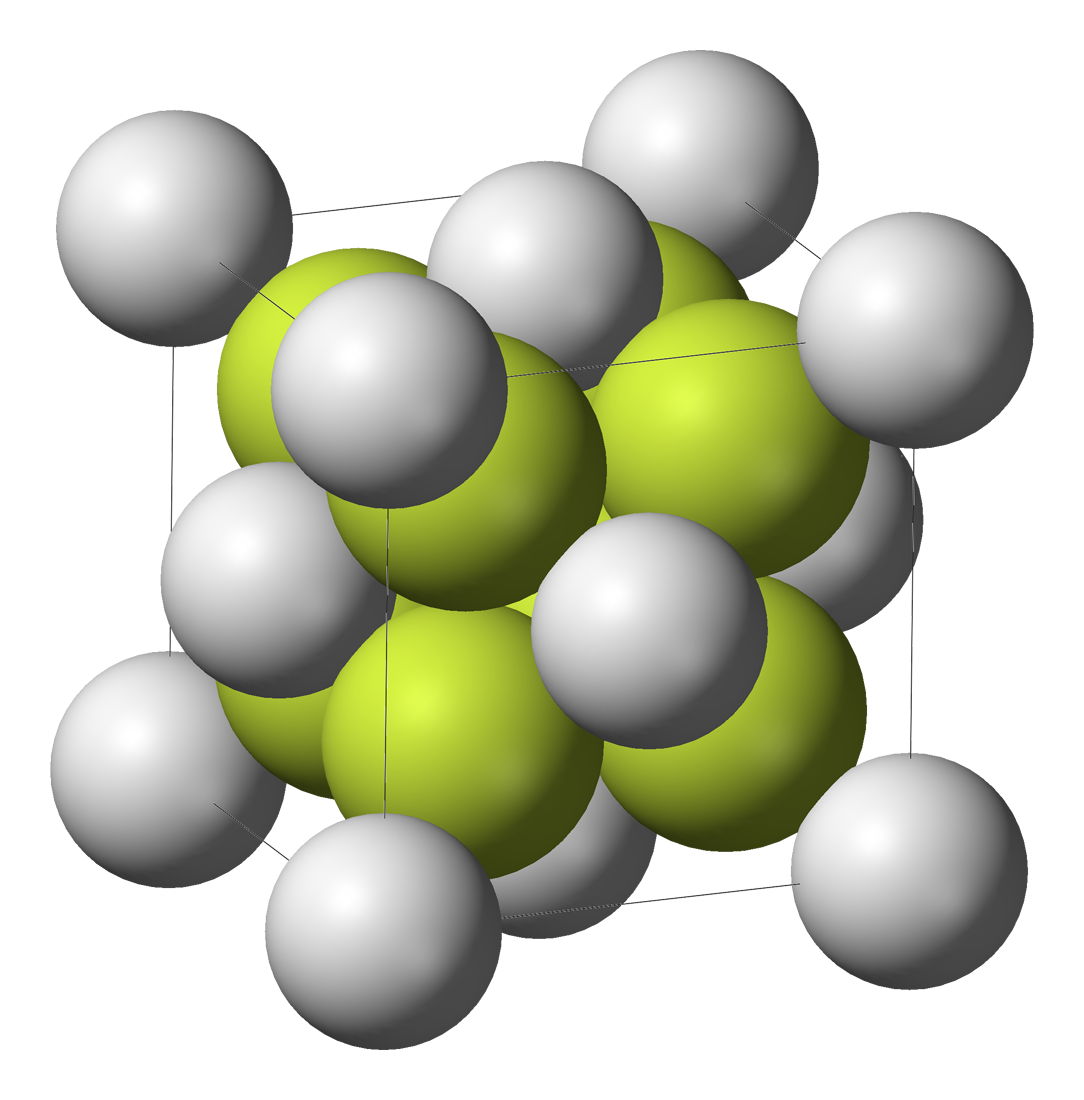

Identifiers
CAS Number	7787-32-8
3D model (JSmol)	Interactive image; Interactive image
ChemSpider	56421
ECHA InfoCard	100.029.189
PubChem CID	62670
RTECS number	CQ9100000
UNII	H96A02I53Y
CompTox Dashboard (EPA)	DTXSID4064848
- InChI: InChI=1S/Ba.2FH/h;2*1H/q+2;;/p-2 Key: OYLGJCQECKOTOL-UHFFFAOYSA-L
- SMILES: F[Ba]F; [Ba+2].[F-].[F-]

Properties
Chemical formula	BaF_{2}
Molar mass	175.324 g/mol
Appearance	white cubic crystals
Density	4.893 g/cm^{3}
Melting point	1,368 °C (2,494 °F; 1,641 K)
Boiling point	2,260 °C (4,100 °F; 2,530 K)
Solubility in water	1.58 g/L (10 °C); 1.61 g/L (25 °C)
Solubility product (K_{sp})	1.84·10^{−7}
Solubility	soluble in methanol, ethanol
Magnetic susceptibility (χ)	−51·10^{−6} cm^{3}/mol
Thermal conductivity	10.9 W/(m·K)
Refractive index (n_{D})	1.557 (200 nm); 1.4744 (589 nm); 1.4014 (10 μm)

Structure
Crystal structure	Fluorite (cubic), cF12
Space group	Fm3̅m, No. 225
Lattice constant	a = 0.62 nm
Formula units (Z)	4

Thermochemistry
Heat capacity (C)	71.2 J/(mol·K)
Std molar entropy (S^{⦵}_{298})	96.4 J/(mol·K)
Std enthalpy of formation (Δ_{f}H^{⦵}_{298})	−1207.1 kJ/mol
Gibbs free energy (Δ_{f}G^{⦵})	−1156.8 kJ/mol

Hazards
- Occupational safety and health (OHS/OSH)
Main hazards	Toxic
- GHS labelling
Pictograms	(GHS07: Exclamation mark)
Flash point	Non-flammable
- Lethal dose or concentration (LD, LC)
LD_{50} (median dose)	250 mg/kg, oral (rat)
Safety data sheet (SDS)	PubChem

Related compounds
Other anions	Barium chloride; Barium bromide; Barium iodide
Other cations	Beryllium fluoride; Magnesium fluoride; Calcium fluoride; Strontium fluoride; Radium fluoride
- Except where otherwise noted, data are given for materials in their standard state (at 25 °C [77 °F], 100 kPa). verify (what is ?) Infobox references

Barium fluoride is an inorganic compound with the formula BaF_{2}. It is a colorless solid that occurs in nature as the rare mineral frankdicksonite. Under standard conditions it adopts the fluorite structure and at high pressure the PbCl_{2} structure. Like CaF_{2}, it is resilient to and insoluble in water.

Above ca. 500 °C, BaF_{2} is corroded by moisture, but in dry environments it can be used up to 800 °C. Prolonged exposure to moisture degrades transmission in the vacuum UV range. It is less resistant to water than calcium fluoride, but it is the most resistant of all the optical fluorides to high-energy radiation, though its far ultraviolet transmittance is lower than that of the other fluorides. It is quite hard, very sensitive to thermal shock and fractures quite easily.

== Optical properties ==
Barium fluoride is transparent from the ultraviolet to the infrared, from 150 to 200 nm to 11–11.5 μm. It is used in windows for infrared spectroscopy, in particular in the field of fuel oil analysis. Its transmittance at 200 nm is relatively low (0.60), but at 500 nm it goes up to 0.96–0.97 and stays at that level until 9 μm, then it starts falling off (0.85 for 10 μm and 0.42 for 12 μm). The refractive index is about 1.46 from 700 nm to 5 μm.

Barium fluoride is also a common, very fast (one of the fastest) scintillators for the detection of X-rays, gamma rays or other high energy particles. One of its applications is the detection of 511 keV gamma photons in positron emission tomography. It responds also to alpha and beta particles, but, unlike most scintillators, it does not emit ultraviolet light. It can be also used for detection of high-energy (10–150 MeV) neutrons, using pulse shape discrimination techniques to separate them from simultaneously occurring gamma photons.

Barium fluoride is used as a preopacifying agent and in enamel and glazing frits production. Its other use is in the production of welding agents (an additive to some fluxes, a component of coatings for welding rods and in welding powders). It is also used in metallurgy, as a molten bath for refining aluminium.

== Gas phase structure ==
In the vapor phase the BaF_{2} molecule is non-linear with an F-Ba-F angle of approximately 108°. Its nonlinearity violates VSEPR theory. Ab initio calculations indicate that contributions from d orbitals in the shell below the valence shell are responsible. Another proposal is that polarisation of the electron core of the barium atom creates an approximately tetrahedral distribution of charge that interacts with the Ba-F bonds.

== Cited sources ==
- Haynes, William M., ed. (2016). CRC Handbook of Chemistry and Physics (97th ed.). CRC Press. p. 4.49. ISBN 9781498754293.
