= Beryllium bromide =

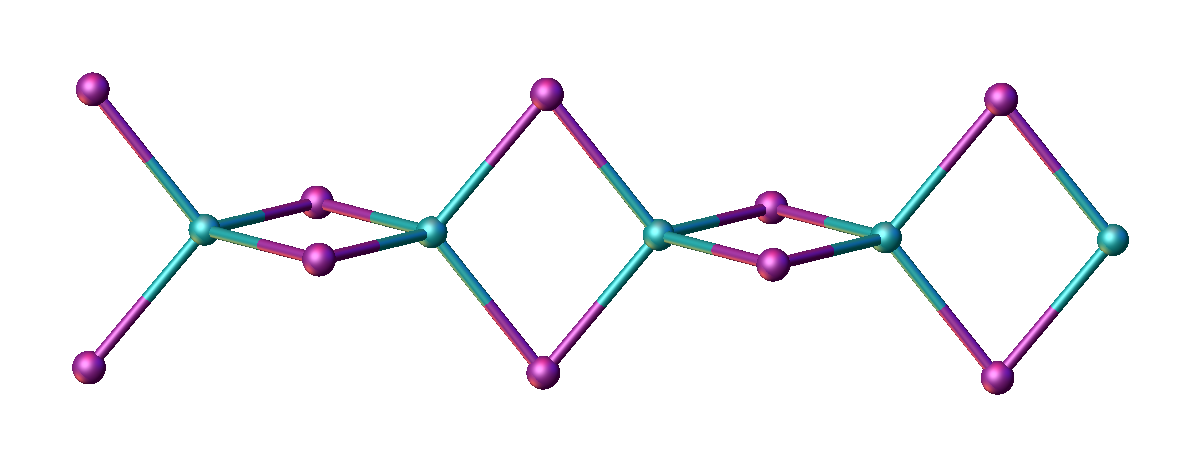

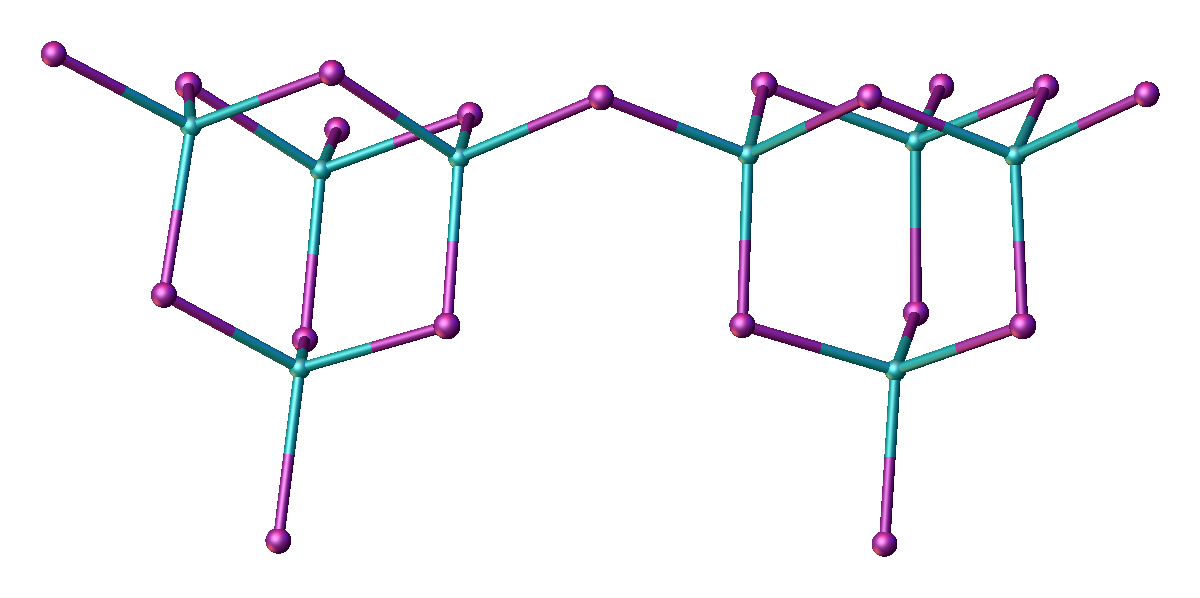

Names
- IUPAC name Beryllium bromide

Identifiers
CAS Number	7787-46-4
3D model (JSmol)	Interactive image
ChemSpider	74208
ECHA InfoCard	100.029.196
EC Number	232-115-9
PubChem CID	82230
UNII	T00751H2J8
CompTox Dashboard (EPA)	DTXSID80999064
- InChI: InChI=1S/Be.2BrH/h;2*1H/q+2;;/p-2 Key: PBKYCFJFZMEFRS-UHFFFAOYSA-L; InChI=1/Be.2BrH/h;2*1H/q+2;;/p-2 Key: PBKYCFJFZMEFRS-NUQVWONBAJ
- SMILES: Br[Be-2](Br)([Br+]1)[Br+][Be-2]1([Br+]1)[Br+][Be-2]1([Br+]1)[Br+][Be-2]1([Br+]1)[Br+][Be-2]1([Br+]1)[Br+][Be-2]1([Br+]1)[Br+][Be-2]1([Br+]1)[Br+][Be-2]1([Br+]1)[Br+][Be-2]1([Br+]1)[Br+][Be-2]1([Br+]1)[Br+][Be-2]1([Br+]1)[Br+][Be-2]1([Br+]1)[Br+][Be-2]1(Br)Br

Properties
Chemical formula	BeBr_{2}
Molar mass	168.820 g/mol
Appearance	colorless white crystals
Density	3.465 g/cm^{3} (20 °C)
Melting point	508 °C (946 °F; 781 K)sublimes at 473 °C (883 °F; 746 K)
Boiling point	520 °C (968 °F; 793 K)
Solubility in water	Highly
Solubility	soluble in ethanol, diethyl ether, pyridine insoluble in benzene

Structure
Crystal structure	Orthorhombic

Thermochemistry
Heat capacity (C)	0.4111 J/g K
Std molar entropy (S^{⦵}_{298})	9.5395 J/K
Std enthalpy of formation (Δ_{f}H^{⦵}_{298})	−2.094 kJ/g

Hazards
- Occupational safety and health (OHS/OSH)
Main hazards	see Berylliosis
- GHS labelling
Pictograms	(GHS06: Toxic) (GHS08: Health hazard) (GHS09: Environmental hazard)
Signal word	Danger
Hazard statements	H301, H315, H317, H319, H330, H335, H350i, H372, H411
Precautionary statements	P260, P301+P310, P304+P340, P305+P351+P338, P320, P330, P405, P501
NFPA 704 (fire diamond)	4 0 0
- NIOSH (US health exposure limits)
PEL (Permissible)	TWA 0.002 mg/m^{3} C 0.005 mg/m^{3} (30 minutes), with a maximum peak of 0.025 mg/m^{3} (as Be)
REL (Recommended)	Ca C 0.0005 mg/m^{3} (as Be)
IDLH (Immediate danger)	Ca [4 mg/m^{3} (as Be)]

Related compounds
Other anions	Beryllium fluoride Beryllium chloride Beryllium iodide
Other cations	Magnesium bromide Calcium bromide Strontium bromide Barium bromide Radium bromide
- Except where otherwise noted, data are given for materials in their standard state (at 25 °C [77 °F], 100 kPa). verify (what is ?) Infobox references

Beryllium bromide is the chemical compound with the formula BeBr_{2}. It is very hygroscopic and dissolves well in water. The Be^{2+} cation, which is relevant to BeBr_{2}, is characterized by the highest known charge density (Z/r = 6.45), making it one of the hardest cations and a very strong Lewis acid.

== Preparation and reactions ==
It can be prepared by reacting beryllium metal with elemental bromine at temperatures of 500 °C to 700 °C:

Be + Br_{2} → BeBr_{2}

When the oxidation is conducted on an ether suspension, one obtains colorless dietherate:

Be + Br_{2} + 2 O(C_{2}H_{5})_{2} → BeBr_{2}(O(C_{2}H_{5})_{2})_{2}

The same dietherate is obtained by suspending beryllium dibromide in diethyl ether:

BeBr_{2} + 2 O(C_{2}H_{5})_{2} → BeBr_{2}(O(C_{2}H_{5})_{2})_{2}

This ether ligand can be displaced by other Lewis bases

Beryllium bromide hydrolyzes slowly in water:

BeBr_{2} + 2 H_{2}O → 2 HBr + Be(OH)_{2}

== Structure ==
Two forms (polymorphs) of BeBr_{2} are known. Both structures consist of tetrahedral Be^{2+} centers interconnected by doubly bridging bromide ligands. One form consist of edge-sharing polytetrahedra. The other form resembles zinc iodide with interconnected adamantane-like cages.

== Safety ==
Beryllium compounds are toxic if inhaled or ingested.
