= Calcium bromide =

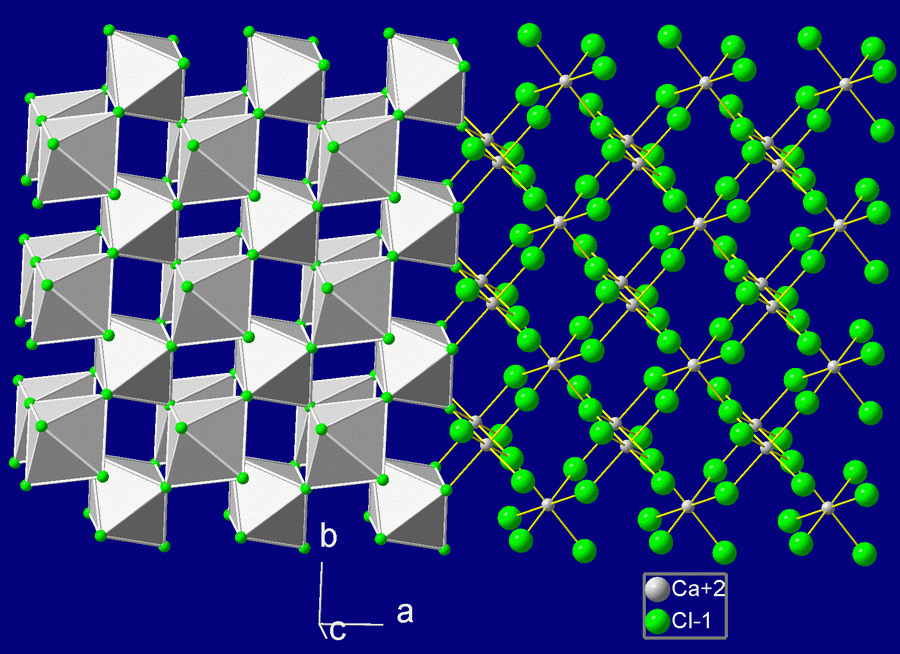

Names
- IUPAC name Calcium bromide
- Other names Calcium dibromide

Identifiers
CAS Number	7789-41-5 anhydrous; 22208-73-7 dihydrate
3D model (JSmol)	Interactive image; Interactive image
ChEBI	CHEBI:31338
ChemSpider	23010
ECHA InfoCard	100.029.240
EC Number	232-164-6
PubChem CID	24608
RTECS number	EV9328000
UNII	87CNY2EEBH
CompTox Dashboard (EPA)	DTXSID0044577
- InChI: InChI=1S/2BrH.Ca/h2*1H;/q;;+2/p-2 Key: WGEFECGEFUFIQW-UHFFFAOYSA-L; InChI=1/2BrH.Ca/h2*1H;/q;;+2/p-2 Key: WGEFECGEFUFIQW-NUQVWONBAA
- SMILES: Br[Ca]Br; [Ca+2].[Br-].[Br-]

Properties
Chemical formula	CaBr_{2}
Molar mass	199.89 g/mol (anhydrous); 235.98 g/mol (dihydrate)
Appearance	anhydrous is hygroscopic colorless crystals sharp saline taste
Density	3.353 g/cm^{3}
Melting point	730 °C (1,350 °F; 1,000 K)
Boiling point	1,815 °C (3,299 °F; 2,088 K) (anhydrous); 810 °C (dihydrate)
Solubility in water	125 g/100 mL (0 °C); 143 g/100 mL (20 °C); 312 g/100 mL (100 °C)
Solubility in alcohol, acetone	soluble
Acidity (pK_{a})	9
Magnetic susceptibility (χ)	−73.8·10^{−6} cm^{3}/mol

Structure
Crystal structure	rhomboid

Thermochemistry
Heat capacity (C)	75 J/mol K
Std molar entropy (S^{⦵}_{298})	130 J/mol K
Std enthalpy of formation (Δ_{f}H^{⦵}_{298})	−647.9 kJ/mol
Gibbs free energy (Δ_{f}G^{⦵})	−656.1 kJ/mol

Hazards
NFPA 704 (fire diamond)	1 0 0
- Lethal dose or concentration (LD, LC)
LD_{50} (median dose)	4100 mg/kg (rat, oral); 1580 mg/kg (mouse, subcutaneous)

Related compounds
Other anions	Calcium fluoride Calcium chloride Calcium iodide
Other cations	Beryllium bromide Magnesium bromide Strontium bromide Barium bromide Radium bromide
- Except where otherwise noted, data are given for materials in their standard state (at 25 °C [77 °F], 100 kPa). verify (what is ?) Infobox references

Calcium bromide is the name for compounds with the chemical formula CaBr_{2}(H_{2}O)_{x}. Individual compounds include the anhydrous material (x = 0), the hexahydrate (x = 6), and the rare dihydrate (x = 2). All are white powders that dissolve in water, and from these solutions crystallizes the hexahydrate. The hydrated form is mainly used in some drilling fluids.

== Synthesis, structure, and reactions ==
It is produced by the reaction of calcium oxide, calcium carbonate with bromine in the presence of a reducing agent such as formic acid or formaldehyde:

CaO + Br_{2} + HCO_{2}H → CaBr_{2} + H_{2}O + CO_{2}

Solid calcium bromide adopts the rutile structure, featuring octahedral Ca^{2+} centres bound to six bromide anions, which also bridge to other Ca^{2+} centres.

When strongly heated in air, calcium bromide reacts with oxygen to produce calcium oxide and bromine:

2 CaBr_{2} + O_{2} → 2 CaO + 2 Br_{2}

== Uses ==
It is mainly used as dense aqueous solutions for drilling fluids. It is also used in neuroses medication, freezing mixtures, food preservatives, photography and fire retardants.

It minimizes the emission of gaseous mercury in the combustion of coal.

=== In the laboratory ===
Calcium bromide forms complexes with triphenylphosphine oxide, allowing for removal of triphenylphosphine oxide from reaction mixtures without the use of chromatography.
