= Beryllium fluoride =

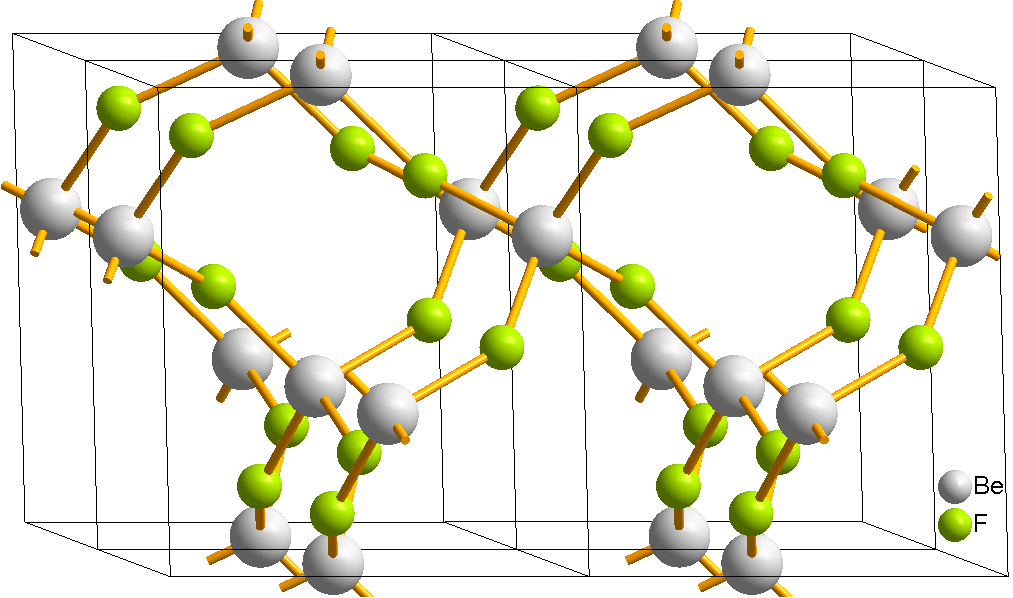

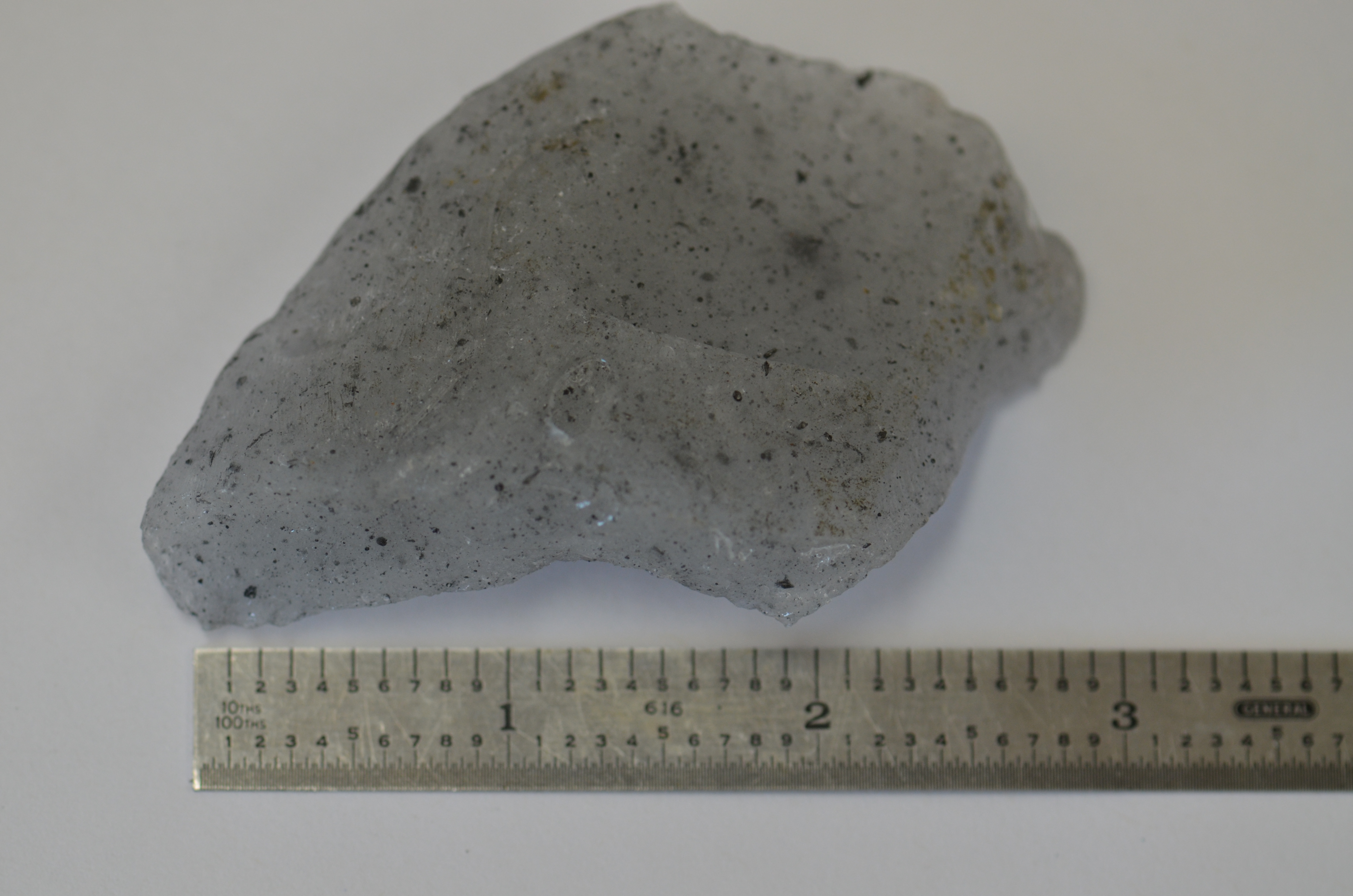

Names
- IUPAC name Beryllium fluoride
- Other names Beryllium difluoride Difluoroberyllane

Identifiers
CAS Number	7787-49-7
3D model (JSmol)	solid ionic form: Interactive image; solid covalent form: Interactive image; gas form: Interactive image
ChEBI	CHEBI:49499
ChemSpider	22992
ECHA InfoCard	100.029.198
PubChem CID	24589
RTECS number	DS2800000
UNII	499FU9DQ5C
CompTox Dashboard (EPA)	DTXSID50873983
- InChI: InChI=1S/Be.2FH/h;2*1H/q+2;;/p-2 Key: JZKFIPKXQBZXMW-UHFFFAOYSA-L; InChI=1/Be.2FH/h;2*1H/q+2;;/p-2 Key: JZKFIPKXQBZXMW-NUQVWONBAD
- SMILES: solid ionic form: [Be+2].[F-].[F-]; solid covalent form: F[Be]F; gas form: [F+]=[Be-2]=[F+]

Properties
Chemical formula	BeF_{2}
Molar mass	47.01 g/mol hygroscopic
Appearance	colorless, glassy lumps
Density	1.986 g/cm^{3}
Melting point	554 °C (1,029 °F; 827 K)
Boiling point	1,169 °C (2,136 °F; 1,442 K)
Solubility in water	very soluble
Solubility	sparingly soluble in ethanol

Structure
Crystal structure	Trigonal, α-quartz
Space group	P3_{1}21 (No. 152), Pearson symbol hP9
Lattice constant	a = 473.29 pm, c = 517.88 pm
Molecular shape	Linear

Thermochemistry
Heat capacity (C)	1.102 J/K or 59 J/mol K
Std molar entropy (S^{⦵}_{298})	45 J/mol K
Std enthalpy of formation (Δ_{f}H^{⦵}_{298})	−1028.2 kJ/g or −1010 kJ/mol
Gibbs free energy (Δ_{f}G^{⦵})	−941 kJ/mol

Hazards
- GHS labelling
Pictograms	
Signal word	Danger
Hazard statements	H301, H305, H311, H314, H315, H319, H330, H335, H372, H411
Precautionary statements	P201, P202, P260, P264, P270, P271, P273, P280, P281, P284, P301+P310, P301+P330+P331, P302+P352, P303+P361+P353, P304+P340, P305+P351+P338, P308+P313, P310, P312, P314, P320, P321, P330, P361, P363, P391, P403+P233, P405, P501
Flash point	Non-flammable
- Lethal dose or concentration (LD, LC)
LD_{50} (median dose)	90 mg/kg (oral, rat); 100 mg/kg (oral, mouse)
- NIOSH (US health exposure limits)
PEL (Permissible)	TWA 0.002 mg/m^{3} C 0.005 mg/m^{3} (30 minutes), with a maximum peak of 0.025 mg/m^{3} (as Be)
REL (Recommended)	Ca C 0.0005 mg/m^{3} (as Be)
IDLH (Immediate danger)	Ca [4 mg/m^{3} (as Be)]
Safety data sheet (SDS)	InChem MSDS

Related compounds
Other anions	Beryllium chloride Beryllium bromide Beryllium iodide
Other cations	Magnesium fluoride Calcium fluoride Strontium fluoride Barium fluoride Radium fluoride
Related compounds	Hydrogen fluoride; Aluminium fluoride
- Except where otherwise noted, data are given for materials in their standard state (at 25 °C [77 °F], 100 kPa). verify (what is ?) Infobox references

Beryllium fluoride is the inorganic compound with the formula BeF_{2}. This white solid is the principal precursor for the manufacture of beryllium metal. Its structure resembles that of quartz, but BeF_{2} is highly soluble in water.

== Properties ==
Beryllium fluoride has distinctive optical properties. In the form of fluoroberyllate glass, it has the lowest refractive index for a solid at room temperature of 1.275. Its dispersive power is the lowest for a solid at 0.0093, and the nonlinear coefficient is also the lowest at 2 × 10^{−14}.

== Structure and bonding ==
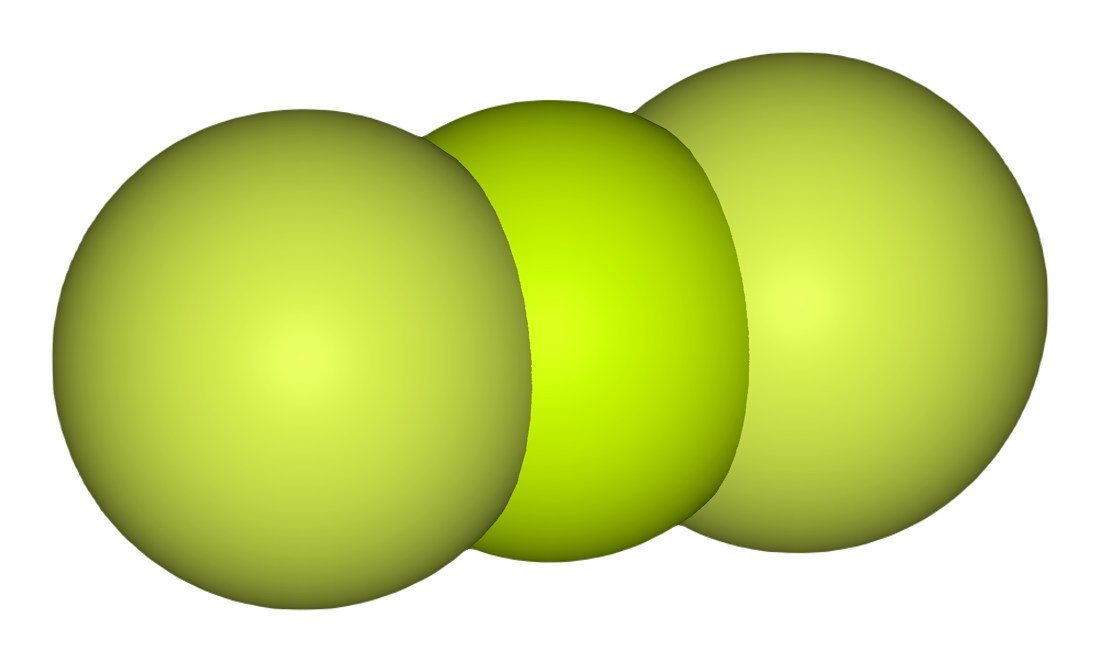
Structure of gaseous BeF_{2}.

The structure of solid BeF_{2} resembles that of cristobalite. Be^{2+} centers are four coordinate and tetrahedral and the fluoride centers are two-coordinate. The Be-F bond lengths are about 1.54 Å. Analogous to SiO_{2}, BeF_{2} can also adopt a number of related structures. An analogy also exists between BeF_{2} and AlF_{3}: both adopt extended structures at mild temperature.

=== Gaseous and liquid BeF_{2} ===
Gaseous beryllium fluoride adopts a linear structure, with a Be-F distance of 143 pm. BeF_{2} reaches a vapor pressure of 10 Pa at 686 °C, 100 Pa at 767 °C, 1 kPa at 869 °C, 10 kPa at 999 °C, and 100 kPa at 1172 °C. Molecular BeF_{2} in the gaseous state is isoelectronic to carbon dioxide.

As a liquid, beryllium fluoride has a tetrahedral structure. The density of liquid BeF_{2} decreases near its freezing point, as Be^{2+} and F^{−} ions begin to coordinate more strongly with one another, leading to the expansion of voids between formula units.

== Production ==
The processing of beryllium ores generates impure Be(OH)_{2}. This material reacts with ammonium bifluoride to give ammonium tetrafluoroberyllate:

Be(OH)_{2} + 2 (NH_{4})HF_{2} → (NH_{4})_{2}BeF_{4} + 2 H_{2}O

Tetrafluoroberyllate is a robust ion, which allows its purification by precipitation of various impurities as their hydroxides. Heating purified (NH_{4})_{2}BeF_{4} gives the desired product:

(NH_{4})_{2}BeF_{4} → 2 NH_{3} + 2 HF + BeF_{2}

In general the reactivity of BeF_{2} ions with fluoride are quite analogous to the reactions of SiO_{2} with oxides.

== Applications ==
Reduction of BeF_{2} at 1300 °C with magnesium in a graphite crucible provides the most practical route to metallic beryllium:

BeF_{2} + Mg → Be + MgF_{2}

Beryllium chloride is not a useful precursor because of its volatility.

=== Niche uses ===
Beryllium fluoride is used in biochemistry, particularly protein crystallography as a mimic of phosphate. Thus, ADP and beryllium fluoride together tend to bind to ATP sites and inhibit protein action, making it possible to crystallise proteins in the bound state.

Beryllium fluoride forms a basic constituent of the preferred fluoride salt mixture used in liquid-fluoride nuclear reactors. Typically beryllium fluoride is mixed with lithium fluoride to form a base solvent (FLiBe), into which fluorides of uranium and thorium are introduced. Beryllium fluoride is exceptionally chemically stable, and LiF/BeF_{2} mixtures (FLiBe) have low melting points (360–459 °C) and the best neutronic properties of fluoride salt combinations appropriate for reactor use. MSRE used two different mixtures in the two cooling circuits.

== Safety ==
Beryllium compounds are highly toxic. The increased toxicity of beryllium in the presence of fluoride has been noted as early as 1949. The LD_{50} in mice is about 100 mg/kg by ingestion and 1.8 mg/kg by intravenous injection.
