= Strontiofluorite =

Halide mineral

General
- Category: Halide mineral
- Formula: SrF_{2}
- IMA symbol: Sflr
- Strunz classification: 3.AB.25

Identification
- Color: Pale gray
- Mohs scale hardness: 4
- Luster: Greasy

Strontiofluorite is a halide mineral that contains the alkali earth metal strontium and the halogen fluorine, a form of strontium fluoride. It can be considered a strontium-analogue of fluorite, which contains calcium as the dominant cation instead.

It is translucent and pale gray in colour.

It appears as cubo-octahedral crystals up to a size of 0.5 mm.

It is found in association with astrophyllite, burbankite, chlorbartonite, fluorapatite, fluorite, lamprophyllite, polezhaevaite-(Ce) and villiaumite.
