= Magnesium bromide =

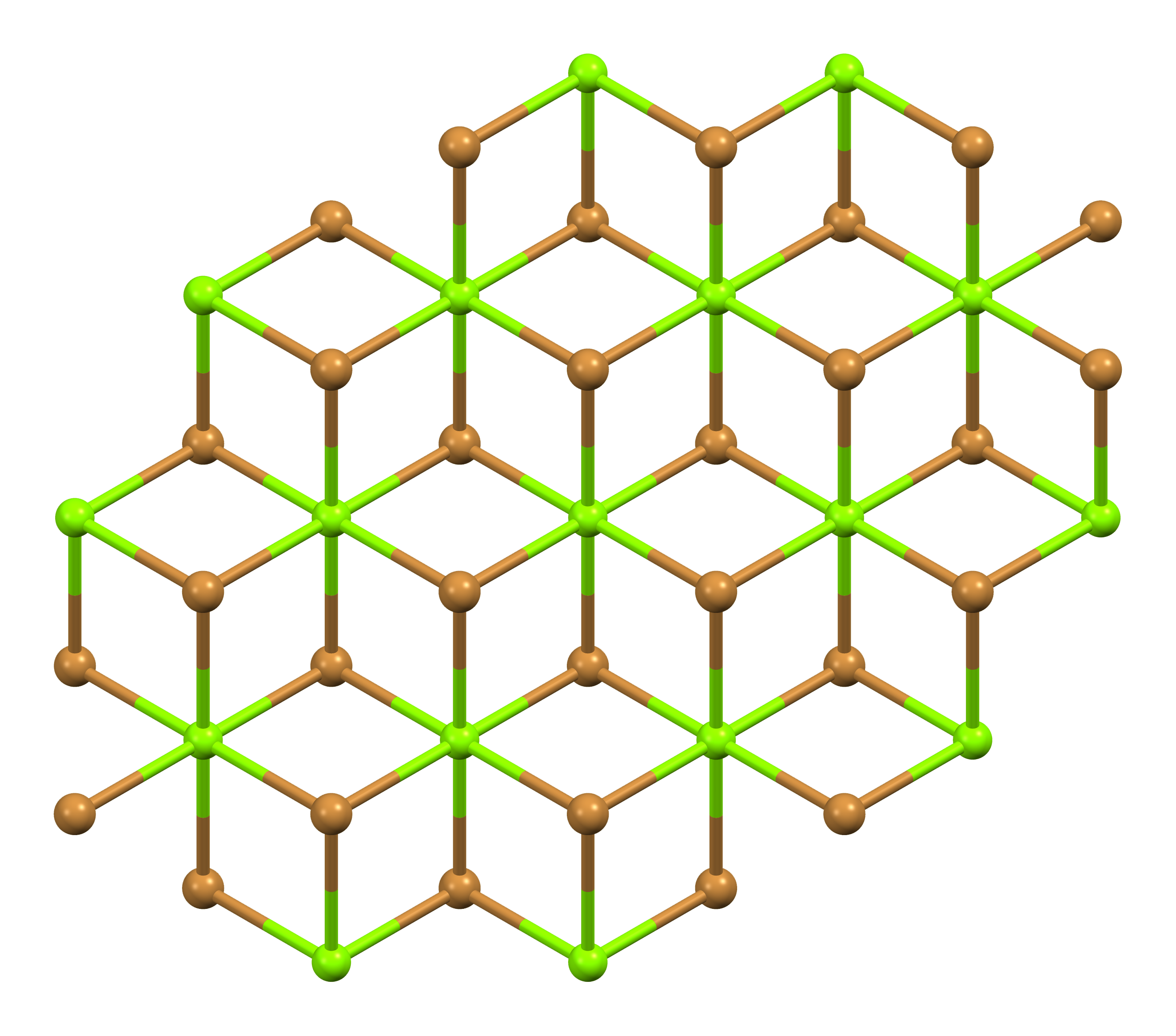

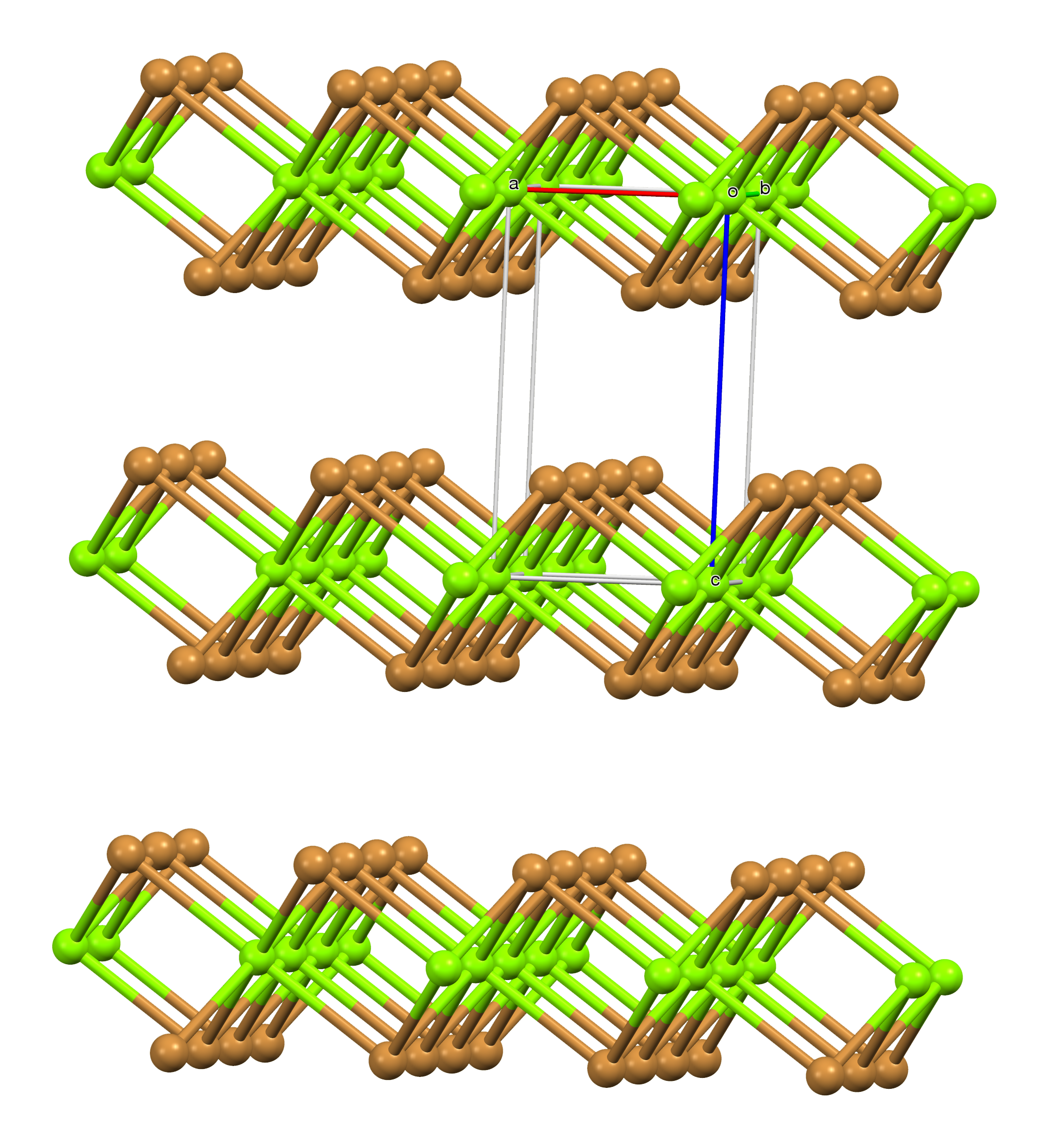

Identifiers
CAS Number	7789-48-2 (anhydrous); 13446-53-2 (hexahydrate); 75198-45-7 (decahydrate)
3D model (JSmol)	Interactive image
ChemSpider	74219
ECHA InfoCard	100.029.246
PubChem CID	522691
UNII	2VC6P60SLN
CompTox Dashboard (EPA)	DTXSID7064865
- InChI: InChI=1S/2BrH.Mg/h2*1H;/q;;+2/p-2 Key: OTCKOJUMXQWKQG-UHFFFAOYSA-L; InChI=1/2BrH.Mg/h2*1H;/q;;+2/p-2 Key: OTCKOJUMXQWKQG-NUQVWONBAY
- SMILES: [Mg+2].[Br-].[Br-]

Properties
Chemical formula	MgBr_{2} (anhydrous); MgBr_{2}·6H_{2}O (hexahydrate)
Molar mass	184.113 g/mol (anhydrous); 292.204 g/mol (hexahydrate)
Appearance	white hygroscopic hexagonal crystals (anhydrous) colorless monoclinic crystals (hexahydrate)
Density	3.72 g/cm^{3} (anhydrous); 2.07 g/cm^{3} (hexahydrate)
Melting point	711 °C (1,312 °F; 984 K) 172.4 °C, decomposes (hexahydrate)
Boiling point	1,250 °C (2,280 °F; 1,520 K)
Solubility in water	102 g/(100 mL) (anhydrous); 316 g/(100 mL) (0 °C, hexahydrate)
Solubility	ethanol: 6.9 g/(100 mL) methanol: 21.8 g/(100 mL)
Magnetic susceptibility (χ)	−72.0·10^{−6} cm^{3}/mol

Structure
Crystal structure	Rhombohedral, hP3
Space group	P-3m1, No. 164
Coordination geometry	octahedral

Thermochemistry
Heat capacity (C)	70 J/(mol·K)
Std molar entropy (S^{⦵}_{298})	117.2 J/(mol·K)
Std enthalpy of formation (Δ_{f}H^{⦵}_{298})	−524.3 kJ/mol

Hazards
NFPA 704 (fire diamond)	1 0 0
Safety data sheet (SDS)	External SDS

Related compounds
Other anions	Magnesium fluoride; Magnesium chloride; Magnesium iodide
Other cations	Beryllium bromide; Calcium bromide; Strontium bromide; Barium bromide; Radium bromide
- Except where otherwise noted, data are given for materials in their standard state (at 25 °C [77 °F], 100 kPa). verify (what is ?) Infobox references

Magnesium bromide are inorganic compounds with the chemical formula MgBr_{2}(H_{2}O)_{x}, where x can range from 0 to 9. They are all white deliquescent solids. Some magnesium bromides have been found naturally as rare minerals such as bischofite and carnallite.

== Synthesis ==
Magnesium bromide can be synthesized by treating magnesium oxide (and related basic salts) with hydrobromic acid. It can also be made by reacting magnesium carbonate and hydrobromic acids, and collecting the solid left after evaporation.

As suggested by its easy conversion to various hydrates, anhydrous MgBr_{2} is a Lewis acid. In the coordination polymer with the formula MgBr_{2}(dioxane)_{2}, Mg^{2+} adopts an octahedral geometry.

== Uses and reactions ==
Magnesium bromide is used as a Lewis acid catalyst in some organic synthesis, e.g., in aldol reaction.

Magnesium bromide also has been used as a tranquilizer and as an anticonvulsant for treatment of nervous disorders.

Magnesium bromide modifies the catalytic properties of palladium on charcoal.

Magnesium bromide hexahydrate has properties as a flame retardant.

Treatment of magnesium bromide with chlorine gives magnesium chloride. This reaction is employed in the production of magnesium chloride from brines.

== Structure ==
Two hydrates are known, the hexahydrate and the nonahydrate. Several reports claim a decahydrate, but X-ray crystallography confirmed that it is a nonahydrate. The hydrates feature [Mg(H_{2}O)_{6}]^{2+} ions.
