= Strontium fluoride =

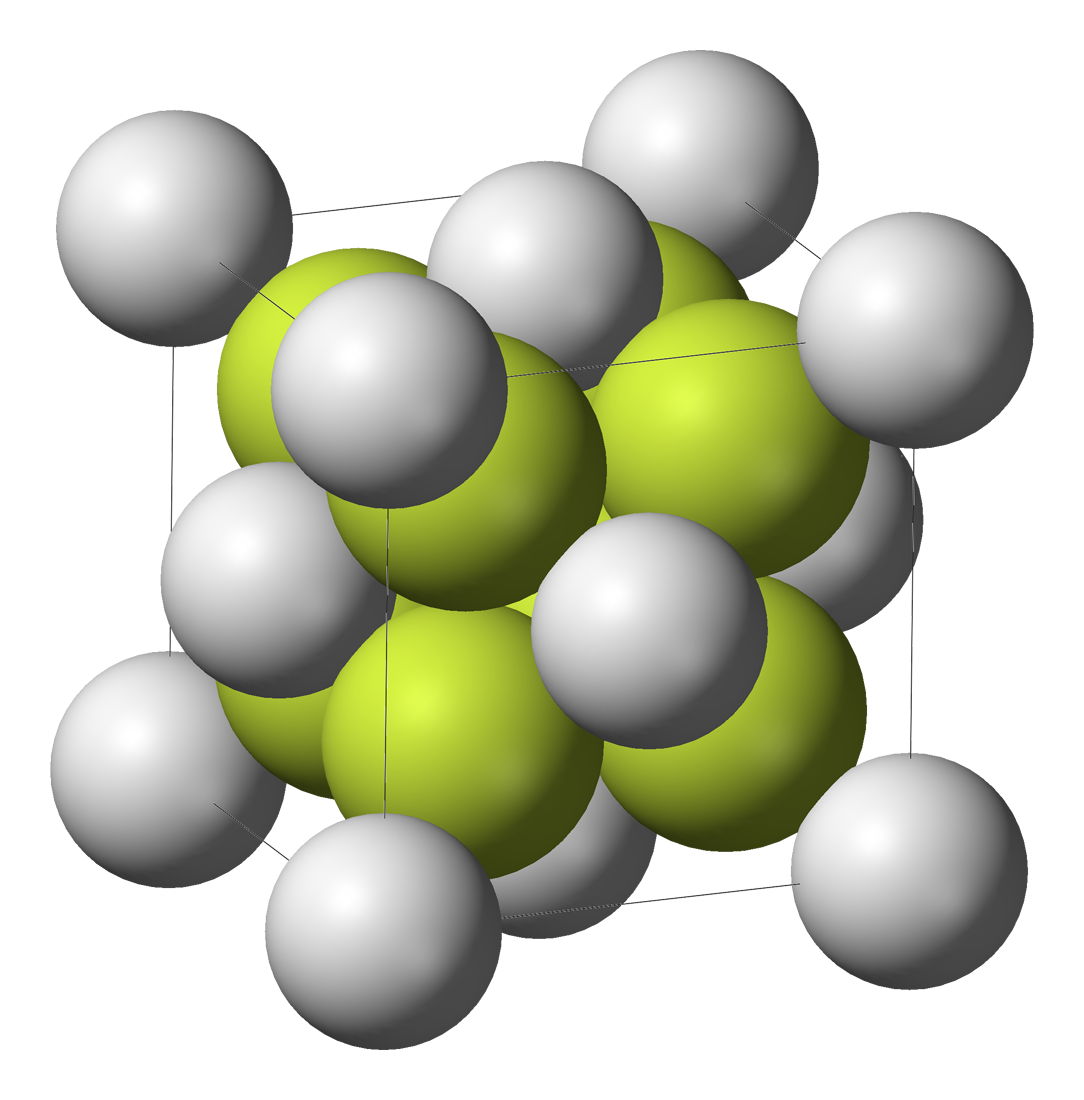
- strontium fluoride

Names
- Other names Strontium difluoride Strontium(II) fluoride

Identifiers
CAS Number	7783-48-4
3D model (JSmol)	Interactive image
ChemSpider	74190
ECHA InfoCard	100.029.091
EC Number	232-000-3
PubChem CID	82210
UNII	EFY8GJS81Z
CompTox Dashboard (EPA)	DTXSID20894160
- InChI: InChI=1S/2FH.Sr/h2*1H;/q;;+2/p-2 Key: FVRNDBHWWSPNOM-UHFFFAOYSA-L; InChI=1/2FH.Sr/h2*1H;/q;;+2/p-2 Key: FVRNDBHWWSPNOM-NUQVWONBAO
- SMILES: [Sr+2].[F-].[F-]

Properties
Chemical formula	SrF_{2}
Molar mass	125.62 g/mol
Density	4.24 g/cm^{3}
Melting point	1,473 °C (2,683 °F; 1,746 K)
Boiling point	2,460 °C (4,460 °F; 2,730 K)
Solubility in water	0.117 g/100 mL
Solubility product (K_{sp})	4.33×10^{−9}
Magnetic susceptibility (χ)	−37.2·10^{−6} cm^{3}/mol
Refractive index (n_{D})	1.439 @0.58 μm

Structure
Crystal structure	cubic crystal system, cF12
Space group	Fm3̅m, #225
Lattice constant	a = 5.80 Å, b = 5.80 Å, c = 5.80 Å α = 90°, β = 90°, γ = 90°
Coordination geometry	Sr, 8, cubic F, 4, tetrahedral

Hazards
Flash point	Non-flammable

Related compounds
Other anions	Strontium chloride Strontium bromide Strontium iodide
Other cations	beryllium fluoride magnesium fluoride calcium fluoride barium fluoride
- Except where otherwise noted, data are given for materials in their standard state (at 25 °C [77 °F], 100 kPa). verify (what is ?) Infobox references

Strontium fluoride, SrF_{2}, also called strontium difluoride and strontium(II) fluoride, is a fluoride of strontium. It is a brittle white crystalline solid. In nature, it appears as the very rare mineral strontiofluorite.

== Preparation ==
Strontium fluoride is prepared by the action of hydrofluoric acid on strontium carbonate.

== Structure ==
The solid adopts the fluorite structure. In the vapour phase the SrF_{2} molecule is non-linear with an F−Sr−F angle of approximately 120°. This is an exception to VSEPR theory which would predict a linear structure. Ab initio calculations have been cited to propose that contributions from d orbitals in the shell below the valence shell are responsible. Another proposal is that polarization of the electron core of the strontium atom creates an approximately tetrahedral distribution of charge that interacts with the Sr−F bonds.

== Properties ==
It is almost insoluble in water (its K_{sp} value is approximately 2.0 × 10^{−10} at 25 degrees Celsius).

It irritates eyes and skin, and is harmful when inhaled or ingested.
Similar to CaF_{2} and BaF_{2}, SrF_{2} displays superionic conductivity at elevated temperatures.

Strontium fluoride is transparent to light in the wavelengths from vacuum ultraviolet (150 nm) to infrared (11 μm). Its optical properties are intermediate to calcium fluoride and barium fluoride.

== Uses ==
Strontium fluoride is used as an optical material for a small range of special applications, for example, as an optical coating on lenses and also as a thermoluminescent dosimeter crystal.

Another use is as a carrier of strontium-90 radioisotope in radioisotope thermoelectric generators.
