= Barium bromide =

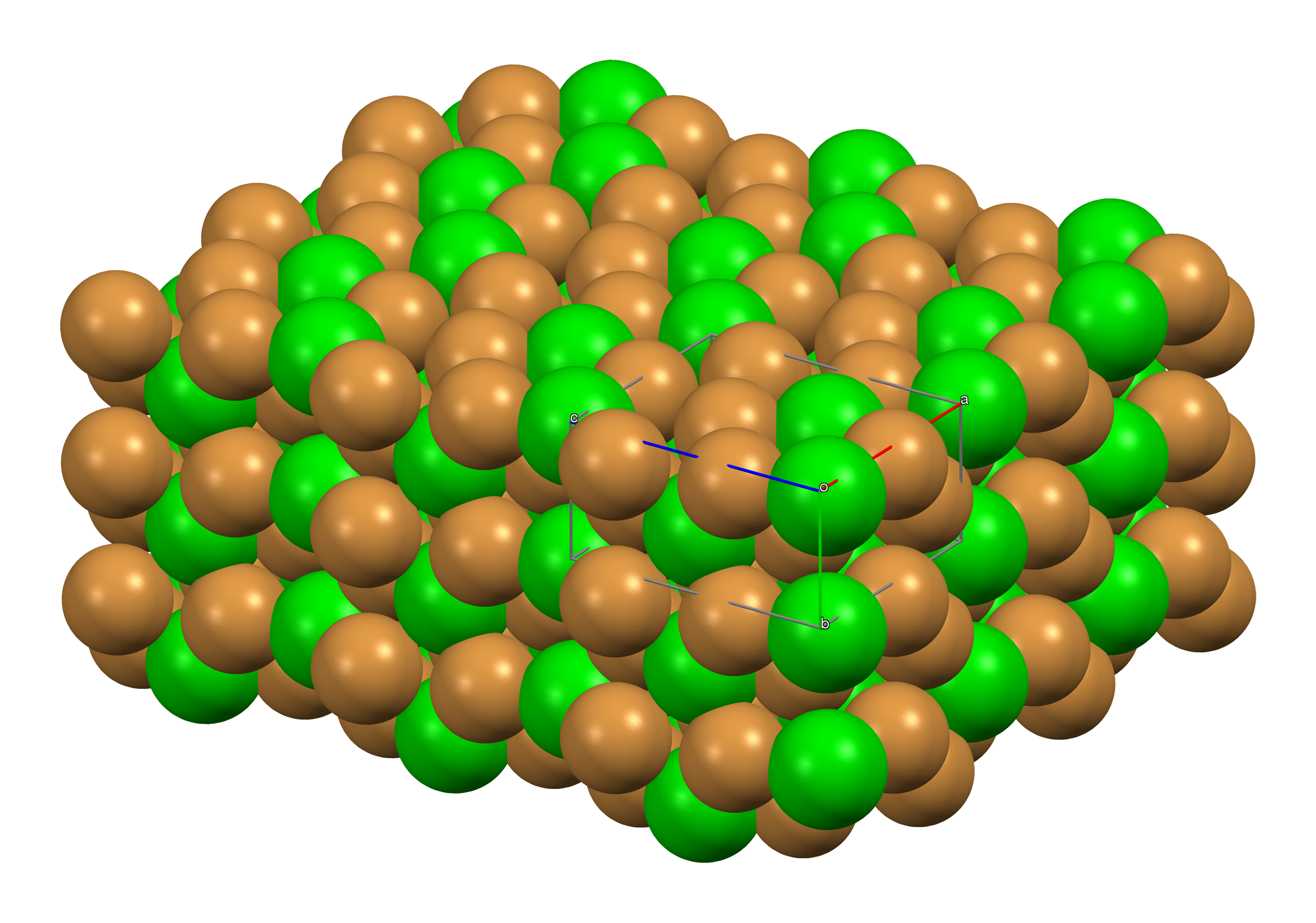
- Barium bromide Space-filling model of the crystal structure

Identifiers
| CAS Number | 10553-31-8 (anhydrous); 7791-28-8 (dihydrate) |
| 3D model (JSmol) | Interactive image; Interactive image |
| ChemSpider | 59728 |
| ECHA InfoCard | 100.031.024 |
| EC Number | 234-140-0 |
| PubChem CID | 5462743 (anhydrous); 44537612 (dihydrate) |
| UNII | TI8NM689HW |
| CompTox Dashboard (EPA) | DTXSID2065123 |
- InChI: InChI=1S/Ba.2BrH/h;2*1H/q+2;;/p-2 Key: NKQIMNKPSDEDMO-UHFFFAOYSA-L; InChI=1/Ba.2BrH/h;2*1H/q+2;;/p-2 Key: NKQIMNKPSDEDMO-NUQVWONBAE
- SMILES: Br[Ba]Br; [Ba+2].[Br-].[Br-]

Properties
| Chemical formula | BaBr_{2} (anhydrous) BaBr_{2}·2H_{2}O (dihydrate) |
| Molar mass | 297.14 g/mol |
| Appearance | White solid |
| Density | 4.78 g/cm^{3} (anhydrous); 3.58 g/cm^{3} (dihydrate) |
| Melting point | 857 °C (1,575 °F; 1,130 K) |
| Boiling point | 1,835 °C (3,335 °F; 2,108 K) |
| Solubility in water | 92.2 g/100 mL (0°C) |
| Magnetic susceptibility (χ) | -92.0·10^{−6} cm^{3}/mol |

Structure
| Crystal structure | PbCl_{2}-type (orthorhombic, oP12) |
| Space group | Pnma (No. 62) |

Thermochemistry
| Std enthalpy of formation (Δ_{f}H^{⦵}_{298}) | −181.1 kcal/mol |

Hazards
- Occupational safety and health (OHS/OSH)
| Main hazards | Toxic |
- GHS labelling
| Pictograms | (GHS07: Exclamation mark) |
| Signal word | Warning |
| Hazard statements | H302, H332 |
| Precautionary statements | P261, P264, P270, P271, P301+P312, P304+P312, P304+P340, P312, P330, P501 |
| NFPA 704 (fire diamond) | 3 0 0 |
| Safety data sheet (SDS) | NIH BaBr |

Related compounds
| Other anions | Barium fluoride Barium chloride Barium iodide |
| Other cations | Beryllium bromide Magnesium bromide Calcium bromide Strontium bromide Radium bromide Lead bromide |
- Except where otherwise noted, data are given for materials in their standard state (at 25 °C [77 °F], 100 kPa). verify (what is ?) Infobox references

Barium bromide is the chemical compound with the formula BaBr_{2}. It is ionic and hygroscopic in nature.

== Structure and properties ==
BaBr_{2} crystallizes in the lead chloride (cotunnite) motif, giving white orthorhombic crystals that are deliquescent.

Coordination geometry of ions in barium bromide
| Ion | Ba^{2+} | Br^{−} (tetrahedral) | Br^{−} (trigonal) |
|---|---|---|---|
| Coordination sphere | {BaBr_{9}} | {BrBa_{4}} | {BrBa_{3}} |
| Ball-and-stick model | | | |
| Coordination number | 9 | 4 | 3 |
| Coordination geometry | (7+2) coordination distorted tricapped trigonal prismatic | distorted tetrahedral | trigonal pyramidal |

In aqueous solution BaBr_{2} behaves as a simple salt.

Solutions of barium bromide reacts with the sulfate salts to produce a solid precipitate of barium sulfate.

BaBr_{2} + SO^{2−}_{4} → BaSO_{4} + 2 Br^{−}

Similar reactions occur with oxalic acid, hydrofluoric acid, and phosphoric acid, giving solid precipitates of barium oxalate, fluoride, and phosphate, respectively.

== Preparation ==
Barium bromide can be prepared by treating barium sulfide or barium carbonate with hydrobromic acid:

BaS + 2 HBr → BaBr_{2} + H_{2}S
BaCO_{3} + 2 HBr → BaBr_{2} + CO_{2} + H_{2}O

Barium bromide crystallizes from concentrated aqueous solution in its dihydrate, BaBr_{2}·2H_{2}O. Heating this dihydrate to 120 °C gives the anhydrous salt.

== Uses ==
Barium bromide is a precursor to chemicals used in photography and to other bromides.
Historically, barium bromide was used to purify radium in a process of fractional crystallization devised by Marie Curie. Since radium precipitates preferentially in a solution of barium bromide, the ratio of radium to barium in the precipitate would be higher than the ratio in the solution.

== Safety ==
Barium bromide, along with other water-soluble barium salts (e.g. barium chloride), is toxic. However, there is no conclusive data available on its hazards.

== In popular culture ==
The compound appears in the intro title card of Breaking Bad, where the first pairs of letters are replaced with Br^{35} and Ba^{56}, the symbols and atomic numbers of bromine and barium respectively.
