= Strontium bromide =

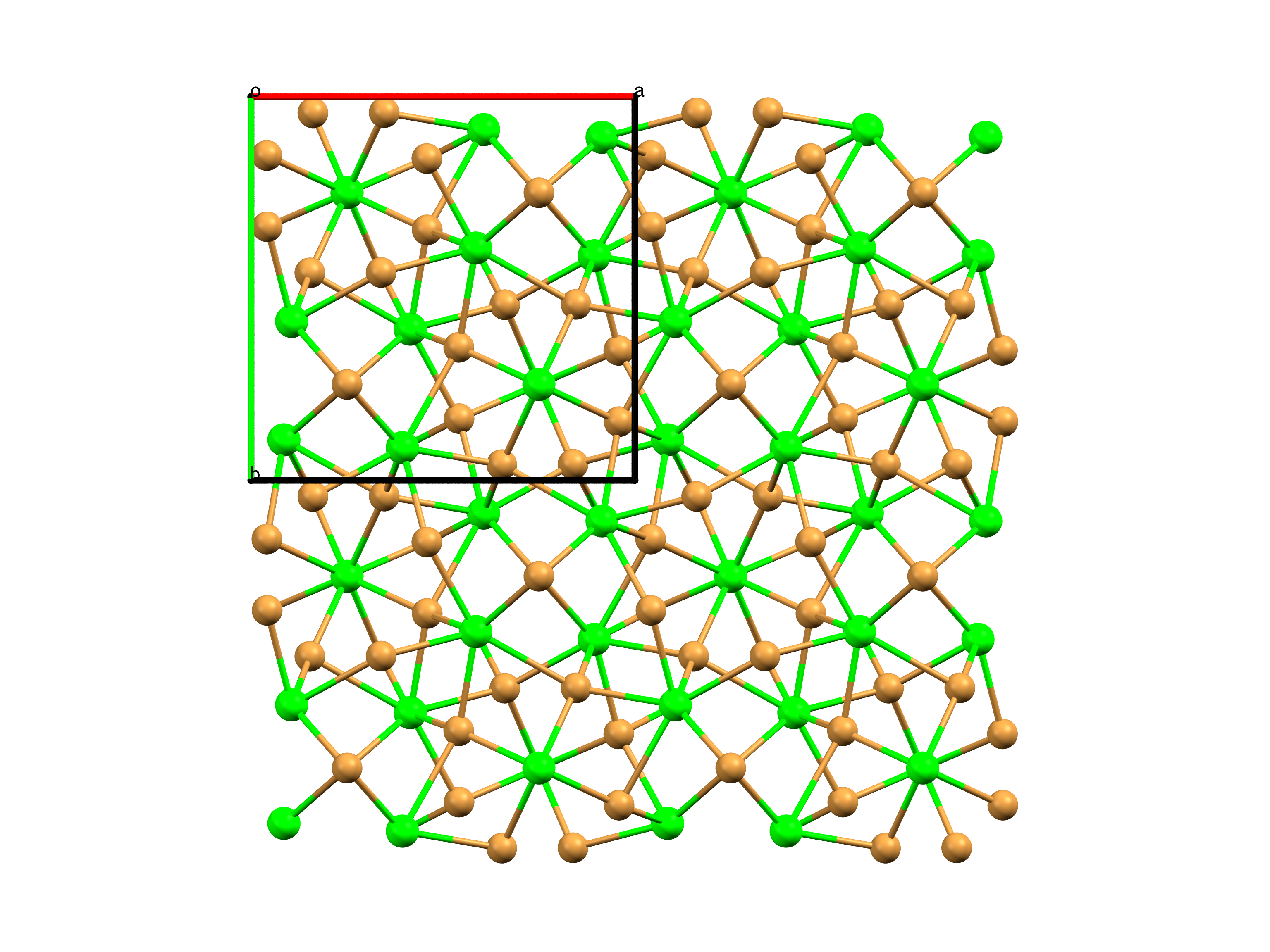

Names
- IUPAC name Strontium bromide

Identifiers
CAS Number	10476-81-0
3D model (JSmol)	Interactive image
ChemSpider	23635
ECHA InfoCard	100.030.868
EC Number	233-969-5
PubChem CID	25302
UNII	1NG558X5VJ
CompTox Dashboard (EPA)	DTXSID40222486
- InChI: InChI=1S/2BrH.Sr/h2*1H;/q;;+2/p-2 Key: YJPVTCSBVRMESK-UHFFFAOYSA-L; InChI=1S/2BrH.Sr/h2*1H;/q;;+2/p-2 Key: YJPVTCSBVRMESK-NUQVWONBAI; Key: YJPVTCSBVRMESK-UHFFFAOYSA-L
- SMILES: [Sr+2].[Br-].[Br-]

Properties
Chemical formula	SrBr_{2}
Molar mass	247.428 g/mol (anhydrous); 355.53 g/mol (hexahydrate)
Appearance	white crystalline powder
Density	4.216 g/cm^{3} (anhydrous); 2.386 g/cm^{3} (hexahydrate)
Melting point	643 °C (1,189 °F; 916 K)
Boiling point	2,146 °C (3,895 °F; 2,419 K)
Solubility in water	107 g/100 mL
Solubility	Soluble in ethanol Insoluble in diethyl ether
Magnetic susceptibility (χ)	−86.6·10^{−6} cm^{3}/mol

Structure
Crystal structure	Tetragonal
Space group	P4/n (No. 85)
Lattice constant	a = 1160.42 pm, c = 713.06 pm
Formula units (Z)	10

Hazards
- Occupational safety and health (OHS/OSH)
Main hazards	Corrosive
NFPA 704 (fire diamond)	1 0 1

Related compounds
Other anions	Strontium fluoride; Strontium chloride; Strontium iodide
Other cations	Beryllium bromide; Magnesium bromide; Calcium bromide; Barium bromide; Radium bromide
- Except where otherwise noted, data are given for materials in their standard state (at 25 °C [77 °F], 100 kPa). verify (what is ?) Infobox references

Strontium bromide is a chemical compound with a formula SrBr_{2}. At room temperature it is a white, odourless, crystalline powder. Strontium bromide imparts a bright red colour in a flame test, showing the presence of strontium ions. It is used in flares and also has some pharmaceutical uses.

== Preparation ==
SrBr_{2} can be prepared from strontium hydroxide and hydrobromic acid.

Sr(OH)_{2} + 2 HBr → SrBr_{2} + 2 H_{2}O

Alternatively strontium carbonate can also be used as strontium source.

SrCO_{3} + 2 HBr → SrBr_{2} + H_{2}O + CO_{2}(g)

These reactions give hexahydrate of strontium bromide (SrBr_{2}·6H_{2}O), which decomposes to dihydrate (SrBr_{2}·2H_{2}O) at 89 °C. At 180 °C anhydrous SrBr_{2} is obtained.

== Structure ==
At room temperature, strontium bromide adopts a crystal structure with a tetragonal unit cell and space group P4/n. This structure is referred to as α-SrBr_{2} and is isostructural with EuBr_{2} and USe_{2}. The compound's structure was initially erroneously interpreted as being of the PbCl_{2} type, but this was later corrected.

Around 920 K (650 °C), α-SrBr_{2} undergoes a first-order solid-solid phase transition to a much less ordered phase, β-SrBr_{2}, which adopts the cubic fluorite structure. The beta phase of strontium bromide has a much higher ionic conductivity of about 1 S/cm, comparable to that of molten SrBr_{2}, due to extensive disorder in the bromide sublattice. Strontium bromide melts at 930 K (657 °C).

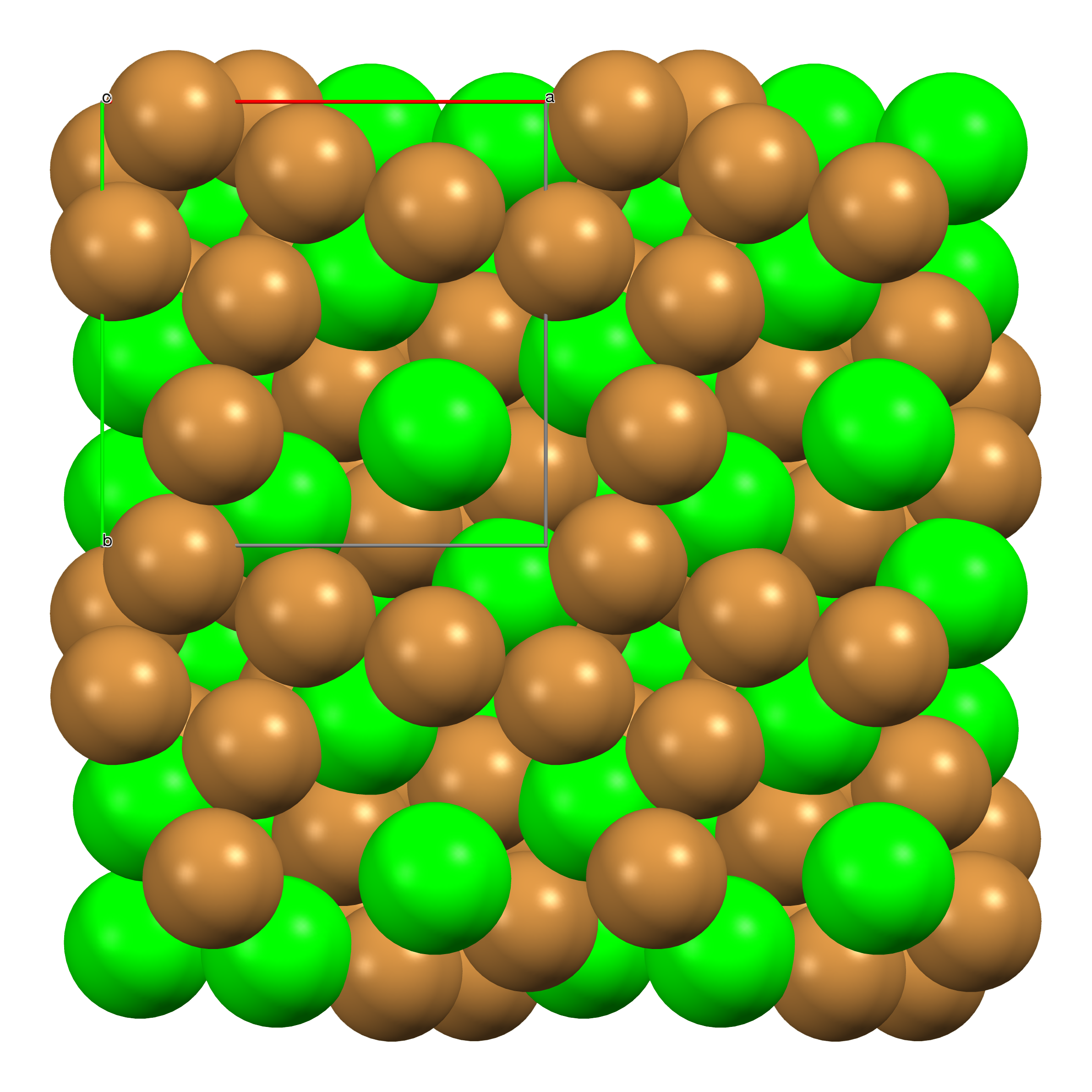
Space-filling model of the packing of Sr^{2+} and Br^{−} ions in α-SrBr_{2}

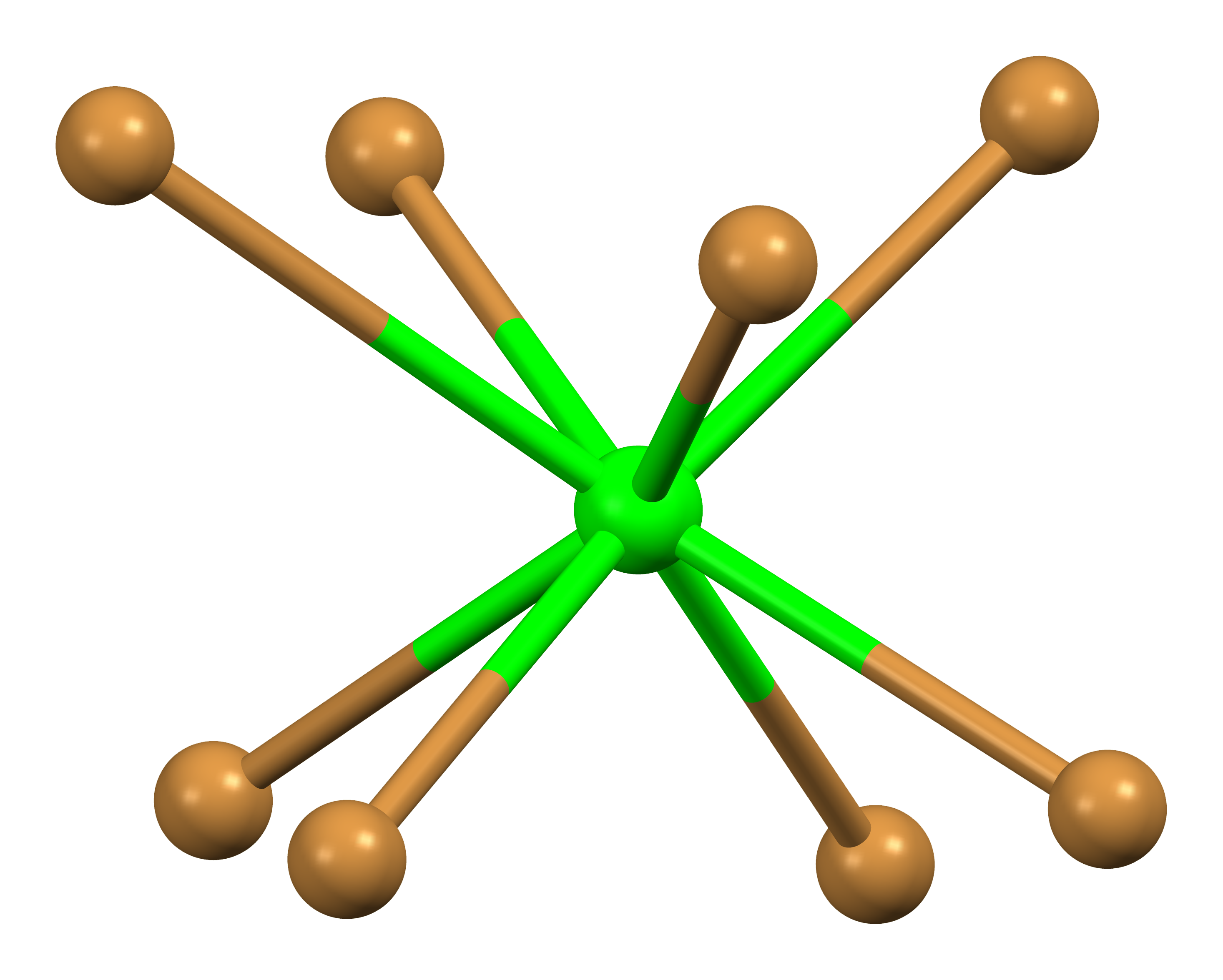
Distorted square antiprismatic coordination geometry of crystallographically independent strontium atom number 1

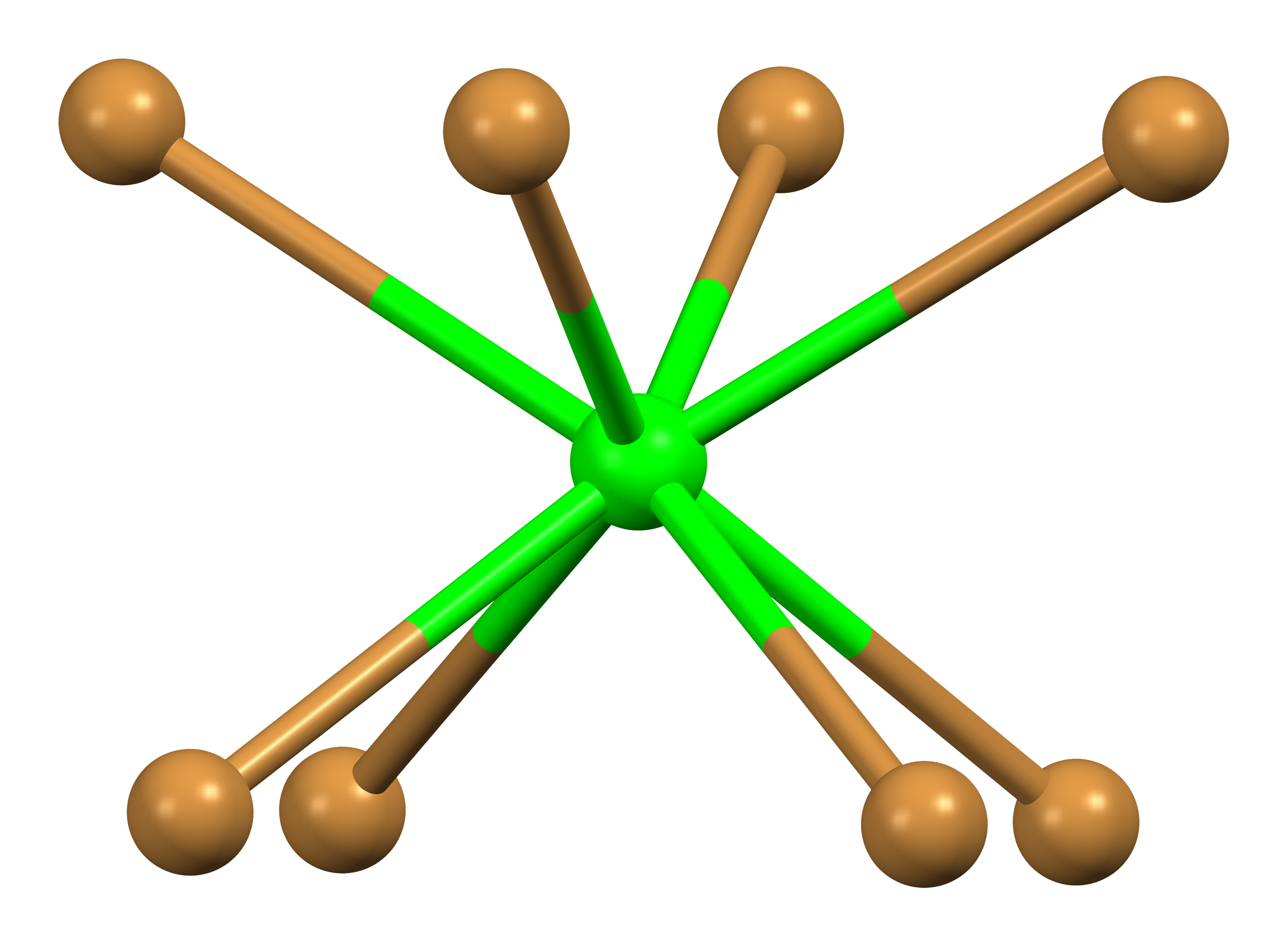
Square antiprismatic coordination geometry of strontium number 2

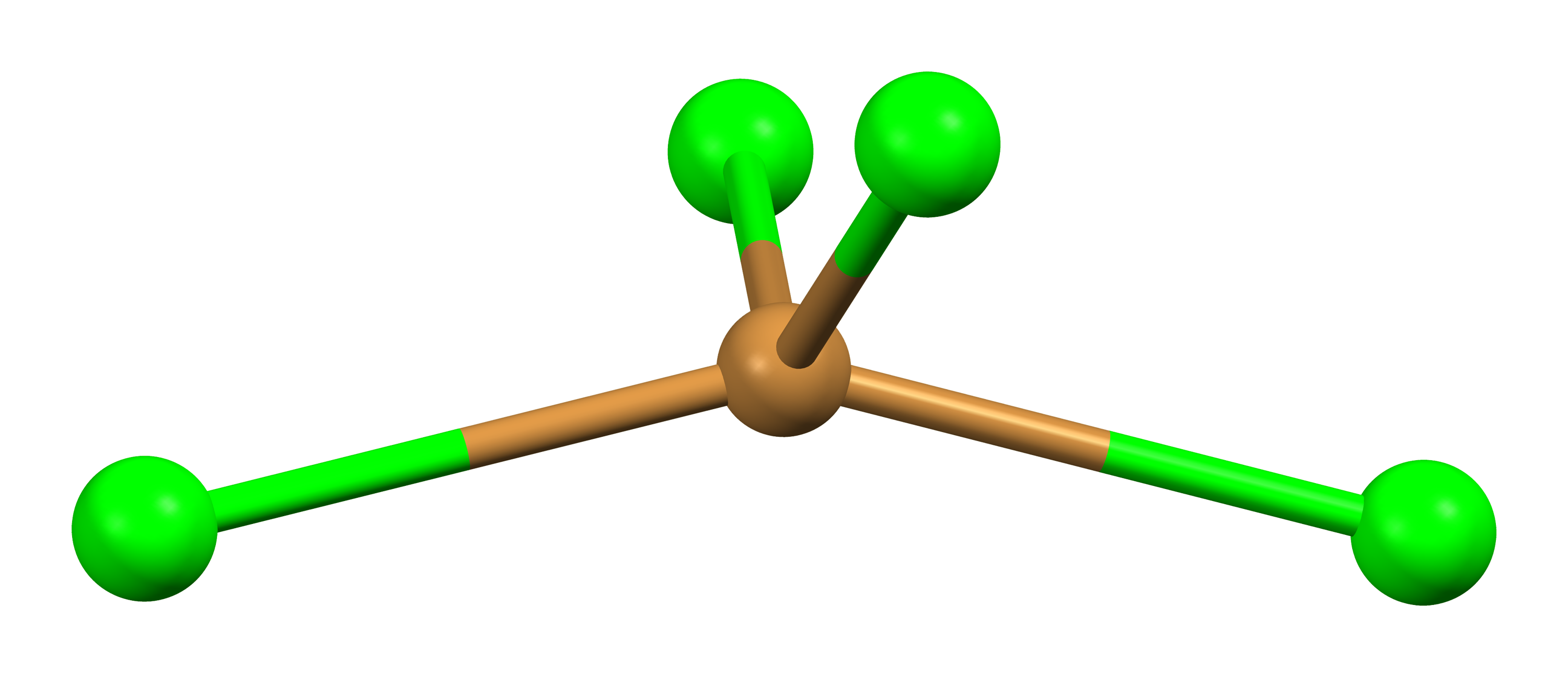
Flattened tetrahedral coordination geometry of bromine number 1

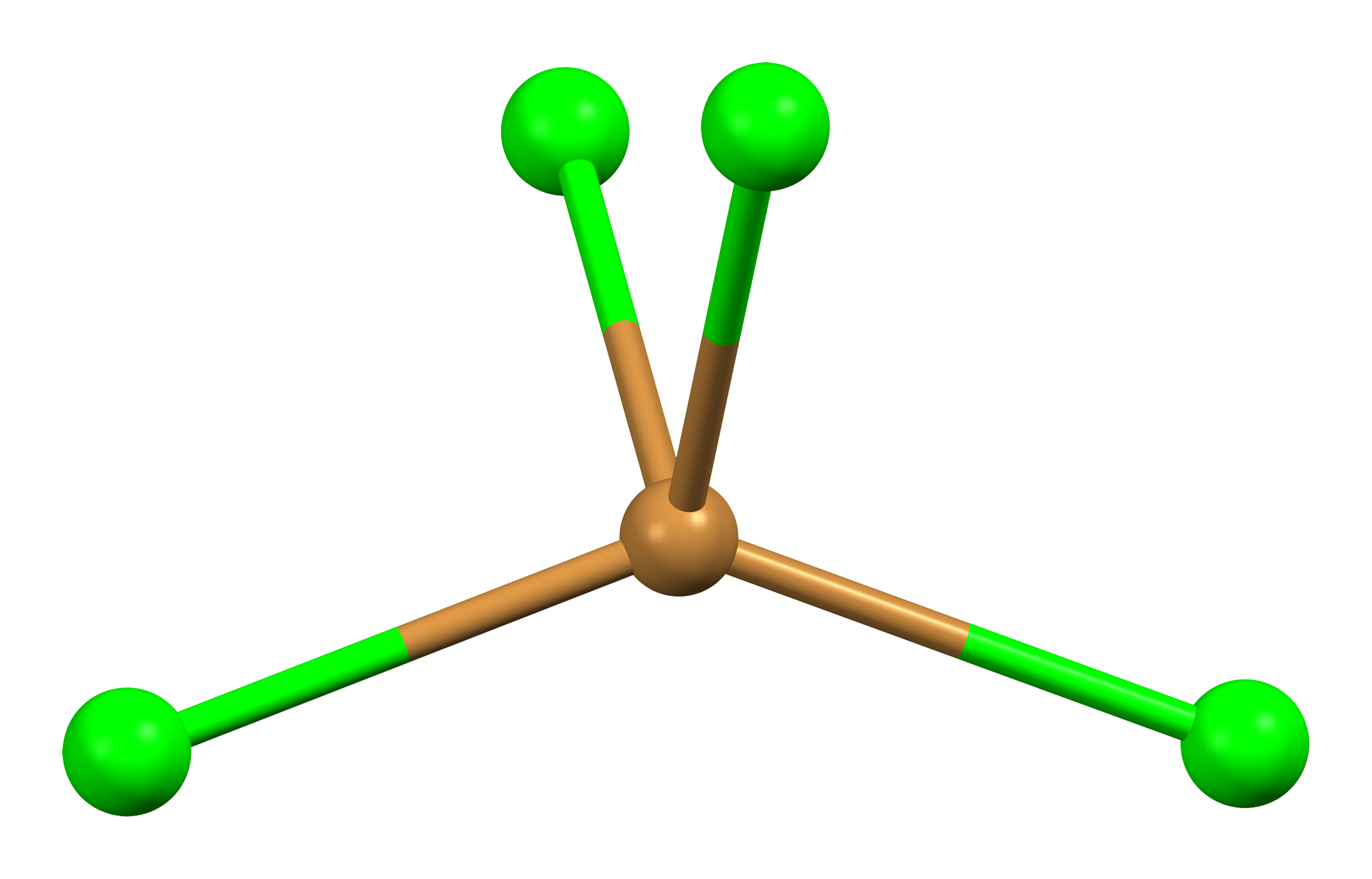
Distorted tetrahedral coordination geometry of bromine number 2

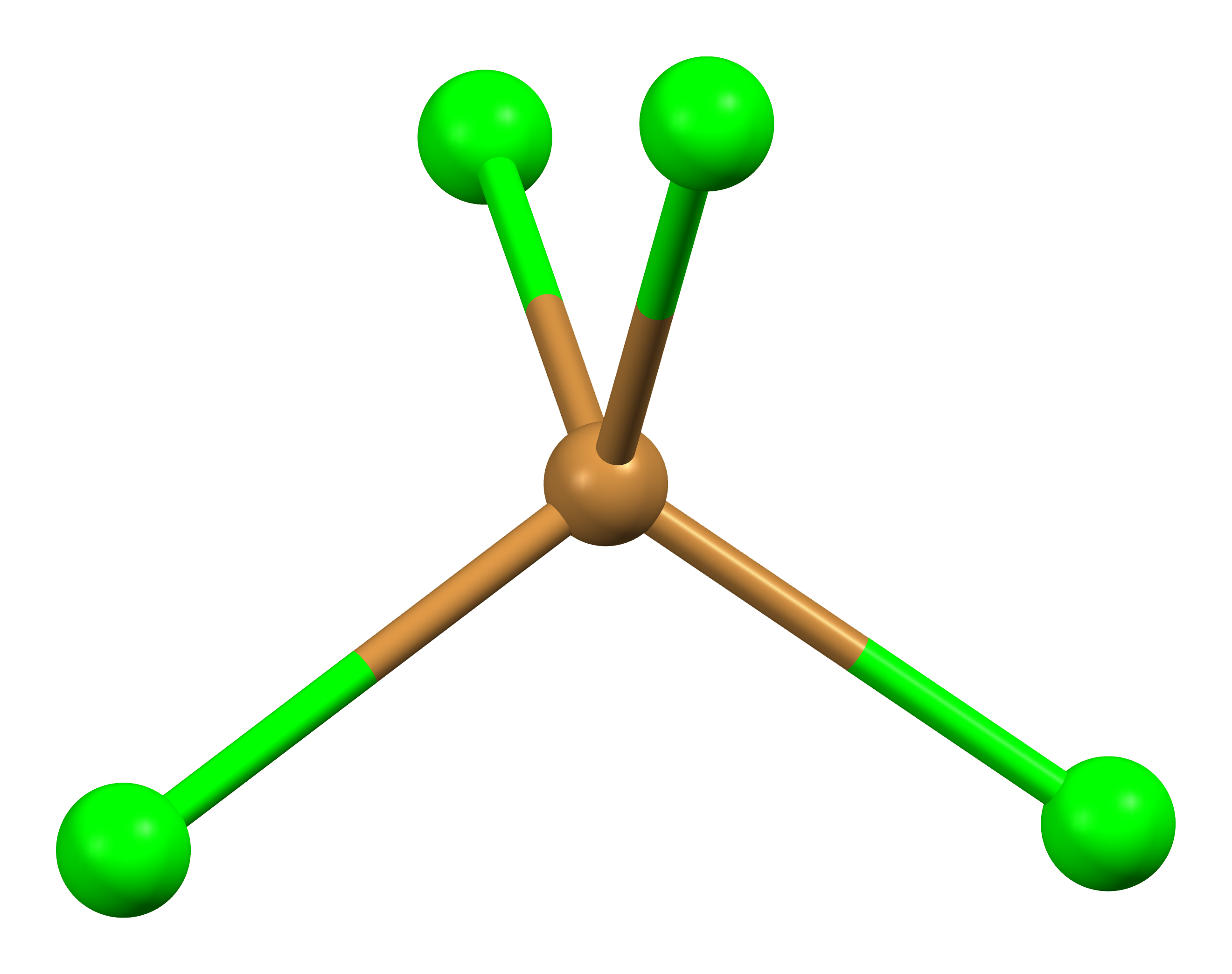
Tetrahedral coordination geometry of bromine number 3

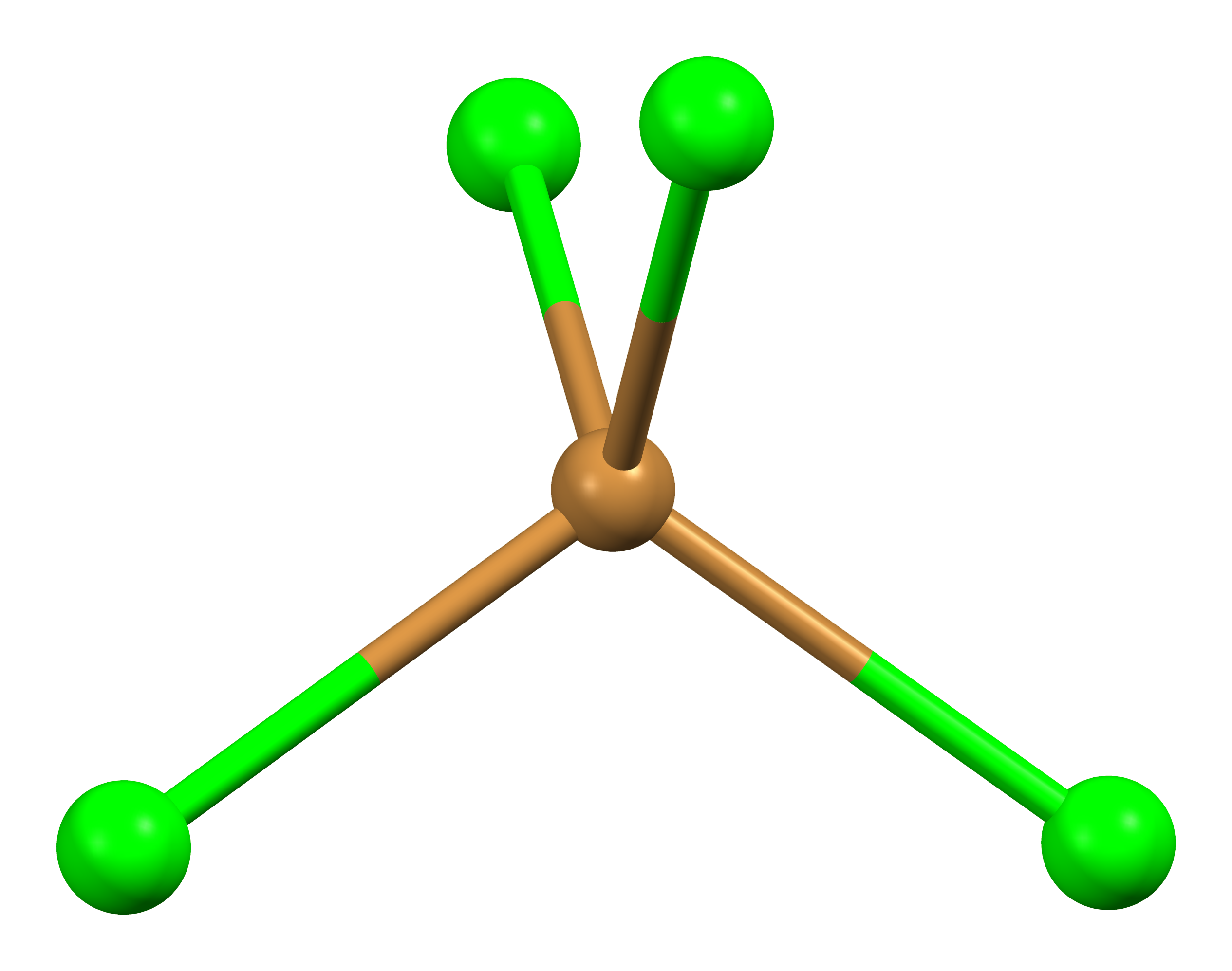
Tetrahedral coordination geometry of bromine number 4

== See also ==
- Strontium chloride
