= Beryllium iodide =

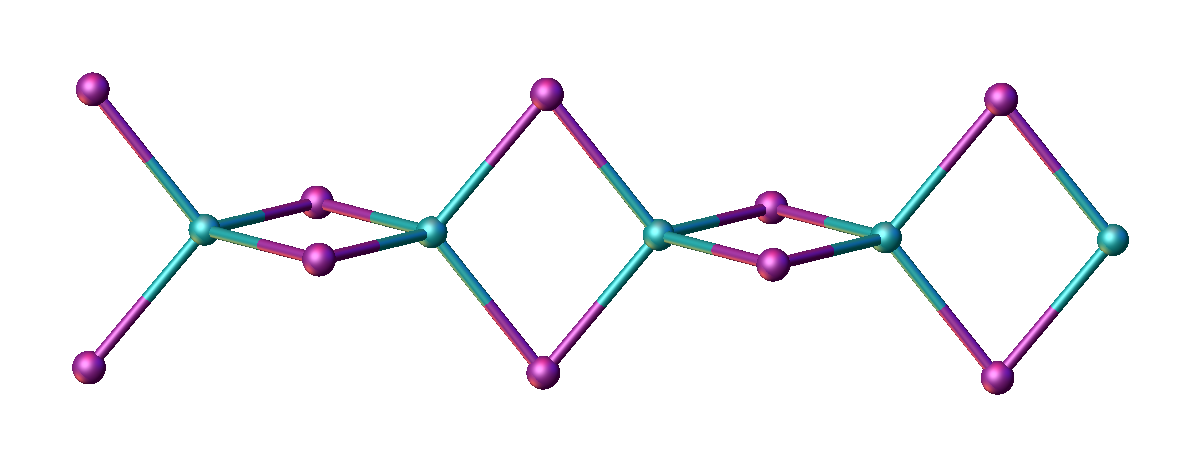

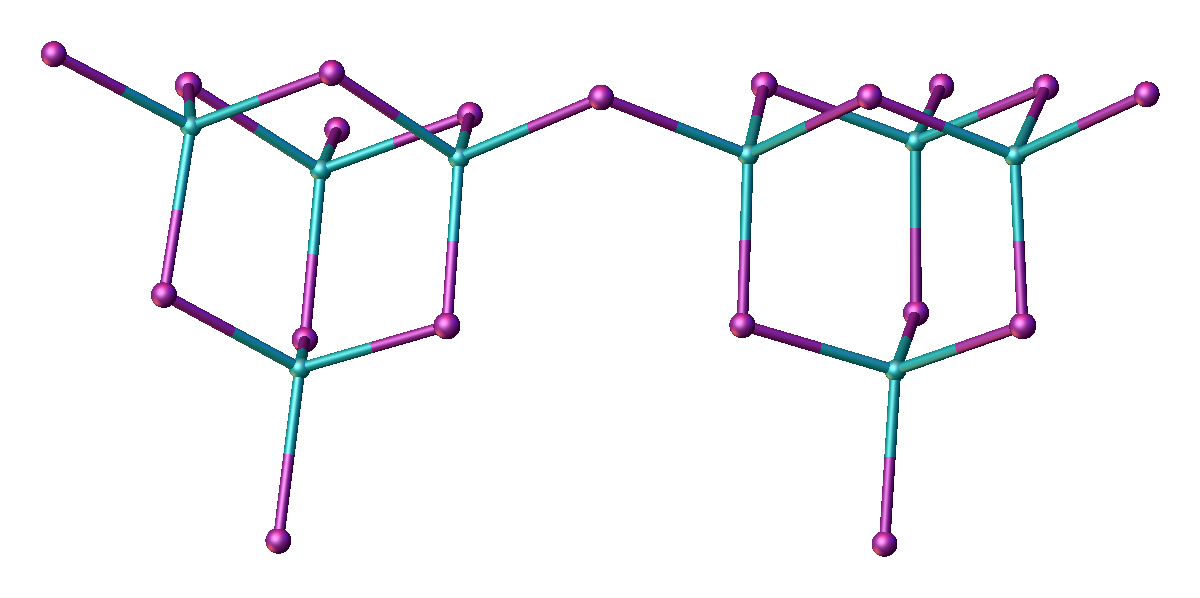

Names
- Systematic IUPAC name Beryllium iodide

Identifiers
CAS Number	7787-53-3
3D model (JSmol)	Interactive image; Interactive image
ChemSpider	74209
ECHA InfoCard	100.029.199
PubChem CID	82231
UNII	9E9VD36EWN
CompTox Dashboard (EPA)	DTXSID9064849
- InChI: InChI=1S/Be.2HI/h;2*1H/q+2;;/p-2 Key: JUCWKFHIHJQTFR-UHFFFAOYSA-L; InChI=1/Be.2HI/h;2*1H/q+2;;/p-2 Key: JUCWKFHIHJQTFR-NUQVWONBAT
- SMILES: I[Be]I; I[Be-2](I)([I+]1)[I+][Be-2]1([I+]1)[I+][Be-2]1([I+]1)[I+][Be-2]1([I+]1)[I+][Be-2]1([I+]1)[I+][Be-2]1([I+]1)[I+][Be-2]1([I+]1)[I+][Be-2]1([I+]1)[I+][Be-2]1([I+]1)[I+][Be-2]1([I+]1)[I+][Be-2]1([I+]1)[I+][Be-2]1([I+]1)[I+][Be-2]1(I)I

Properties
Chemical formula	BeI_{2}
Molar mass	262.82112 g·mol^{−1}
Appearance	colorless needle-like crystals
Density	4.325 g/cm^{3}
Melting point	480 °C (896 °F; 753 K)
Boiling point	590 °C (1,094 °F; 863 K)
Solubility in water	reacts with water
Solubility	Slightly soluble in CS_{2} Soluble in ethanol, diethyl ether

Structure
Crystal structure	orthorhombic

Thermochemistry
Heat capacity (C)	71.14 J/(mol·K)
Std molar entropy (S^{⦵}_{298})	130 J/(mol·K)
Std enthalpy of formation (Δ_{f}H^{⦵}_{298})	−192.62 kJ/mol
Gibbs free energy (Δ_{f}G^{⦵})	−210 kJ/mol
Std enthalpy of combustion (Δ_{c}H^{⦵}_{298})	19 kJ/mol

Hazards
- Occupational safety and health (OHS/OSH)
Main hazards	see Berylliosis
NFPA 704 (fire diamond)	3 3 2 W
- NIOSH (US health exposure limits)
PEL (Permissible)	TWA 0.002 mg/m^{3} C 0.005 mg/m^{3} (30 minutes), with a maximum peak of 0.025 mg/m^{3} (as Be)
REL (Recommended)	Ca C 0.0005 mg/m^{3} (as Be)
IDLH (Immediate danger)	Ca [4 mg/m^{3} (as Be)]

Related compounds
Other anions	Beryllium fluoride; Beryllium chloride; Beryllium bromide
Other cations	Magnesium iodide; Calcium iodide; Strontium iodide; Barium iodide; Radium iodide
Related compounds	Hydrogen iodide; Zinc iodide
- Except where otherwise noted, data are given for materials in their standard state (at 25 °C [77 °F], 100 kPa). verify (what is ?) Infobox references

Beryllium iodide is an inorganic compound with the chemical formula BeI_{2}. It is a hygroscopic white solid. The Be^{2+} cation, which is relevant to salt-like BeI_{2}, is characterized by the highest known charge density (Z/r = 6.45), making it one of the hardest cations and a very strong Lewis acid.

== Reactions ==
Beryllium iodide can be prepared by reacting beryllium metal with elemental iodine at temperatures of 500 °C to 700 °C:

Be + I_{2} → BeI_{2}

When the oxidation is conducted on an ether suspension of elemental Be, one obtains colorless dietherate:

Be + I_{2} + 2 O(C_{2}H_{5})_{2} → BeI_{2}(O(C_{2}H_{5})_{2})_{2}

The same dietherate is obtained by suspending beryllium iodide in diethyl ether:

BeI_{2} + 2 O(C_{2}H_{5})_{2} → BeI_{2}(O(C_{2}H_{5})_{2})_{2}

This ether ligands in BeI_{2}(O(C_{2}H_{5})_{2})_{2} can be displaced by other Lewis bases.

Beryllium iodide reacts with fluorine giving beryllium fluoride and fluorides of iodine, with chlorine giving beryllium chloride, and with bromine giving beryllium bromide.

== Structure ==
Two forms (polymorphs) of BeI_{2} are known. Both structures consist tetrahedral Be^{2+} centers interconnected by doubly bridging iodide ligands. One form consist of edge-sharing polytetrahedra. The other form resembles zinc iodide with interconnected adamantane-like cages.

== Applications ==
Beryllium iodide can be used in the preparation of high-purity beryllium by the decomposition of the compound on a hot tungsten filament.
