= Strontium iodide =

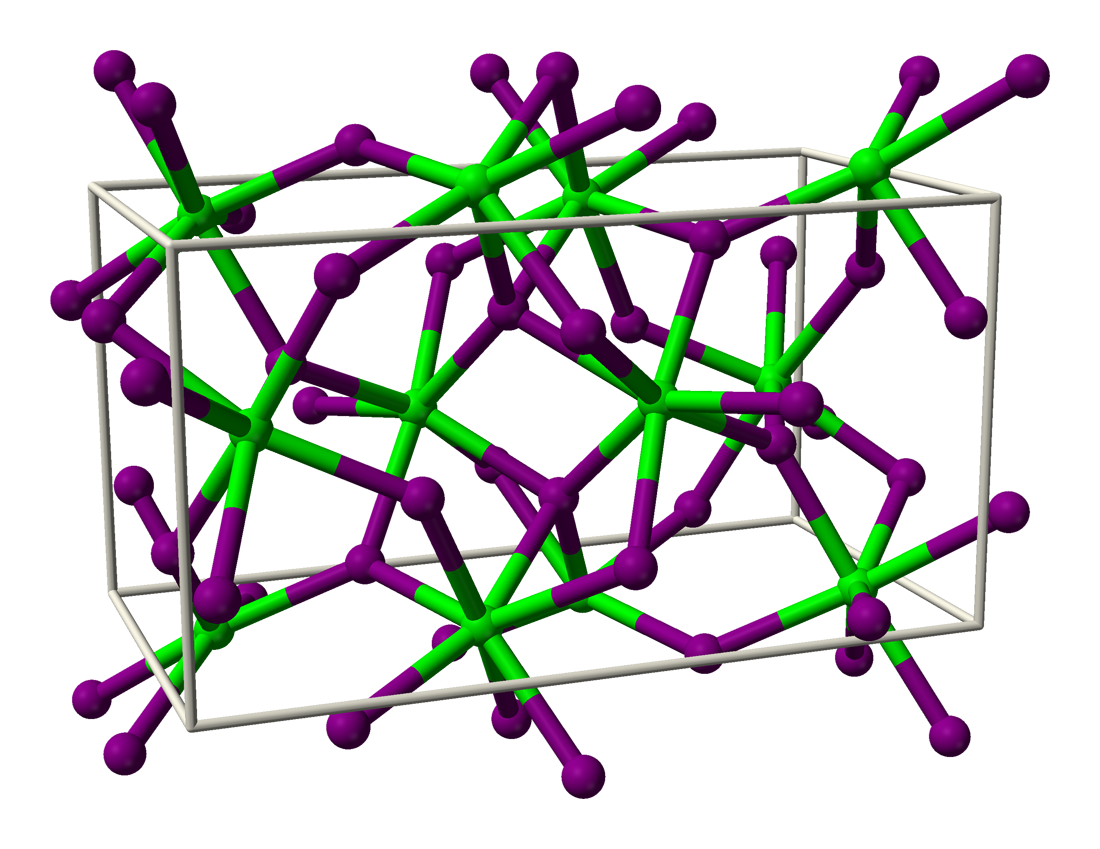

Names
- IUPAC name Strontium iodide

Identifiers
CAS Number	10476-86-5 (anhydrous)
3D model (JSmol)	Interactive image; Interactive image
ChemSpider	23637
ECHA InfoCard	100.030.871
EC Number	233-972-1
PubChem CID	25304
RTECS number	WK9275000
UNII	F6V5HOR0O5
CompTox Dashboard (EPA)	DTXSID10909176
- InChI: InChI=1S/2HI.Sr/h2*1H;/q;;+2/p-2
- SMILES: I[Sr]I; [Sr+2].[I-].[I-]

Properties
Chemical formula	SrI_{2} (anhydrous); SrI_{2}·6H_{2}O (hexahydrate)
Molar mass	341.43 g·mol^{−1} (anhydrous)
Appearance	Colorless to white crystalline plates
Density	4.55 g/cm^{3} (anhydrous); 4.40 g/cm^{3} (hexahydrate)
Melting point	507 to 645 °C (945 to 1,193 °F; 780 to 918 K)
Boiling point	1,773 °C (3,223 °F; 2,046 K) (decomposes)
Solubility in water	177.0 g/100 mL (20 °C)
Solubility in ethanol	3.1 g/100 ml (4 °C)
Magnetic susceptibility (χ)	−112.0·10^{−6} cm^{3}/mol

Structure
Crystal structure	Orthorhombic, oP24
Space group	Pbca, No. 61

Hazards
- Occupational safety and health (OHS/OSH)
Main hazards	Corrosive
- GHS labelling
Pictograms	(GHS05: Corrosive)
Signal word	Danger
Hazard statements	H314
Precautionary statements	P280, P305+P351+P338, P310
NFPA 704 (fire diamond)	1 0 0

Related compounds
Other anions	strontium fluoride strontium chloride strontium bromide
Other cations	beryllium iodide magnesium iodide calcium iodide barium iodide
- Except where otherwise noted, data are given for materials in their standard state (at 25 °C [77 °F], 100 kPa). verify (what is ?) Infobox references

Strontium iodide is an inorganic compound with the chemical formula SrI_{2}. It is a salt of strontium and iodine. It forms a hexahydrate SrI_{2}·6H_{2}O. It is an ionic, water-soluble, and deliquescent compound that can be used in medicine as a substitute for potassium iodide. It is also used as a scintillation gamma radiation detector, typically doped with europium, due to its optical clarity, relatively high density, high effective atomic number (Z=48), and high scintillation light yield. In recent years, europium-doped strontium iodide (SrI_{2}:Eu^{2+}) has emerged as a promising scintillation material for gamma-ray spectroscopy with extremely high light yield and proportional response, exceeding that of the widely used high performance commercial scintillator LaBr_{3}:Ce^{3+}. Large diameter SrI_{2} crystals can be grown reliably using vertical Bridgman technique and are being commercialized by several companies.

== Reactions ==
Strontium iodide can be prepared by reacting strontium carbonate with hydroiodic acid:

SrCO_{3} + 2 HI(aq) → SrI_{2} + H_{2}O + CO_{2}

Strontium iodide forms a white powder that slowly changes to a yellowish colour when exposed to air. At high temperatures (in the presence of air) strontium iodide completely decomposes to form strontium oxide and free iodine.
