= Calcium iodide =

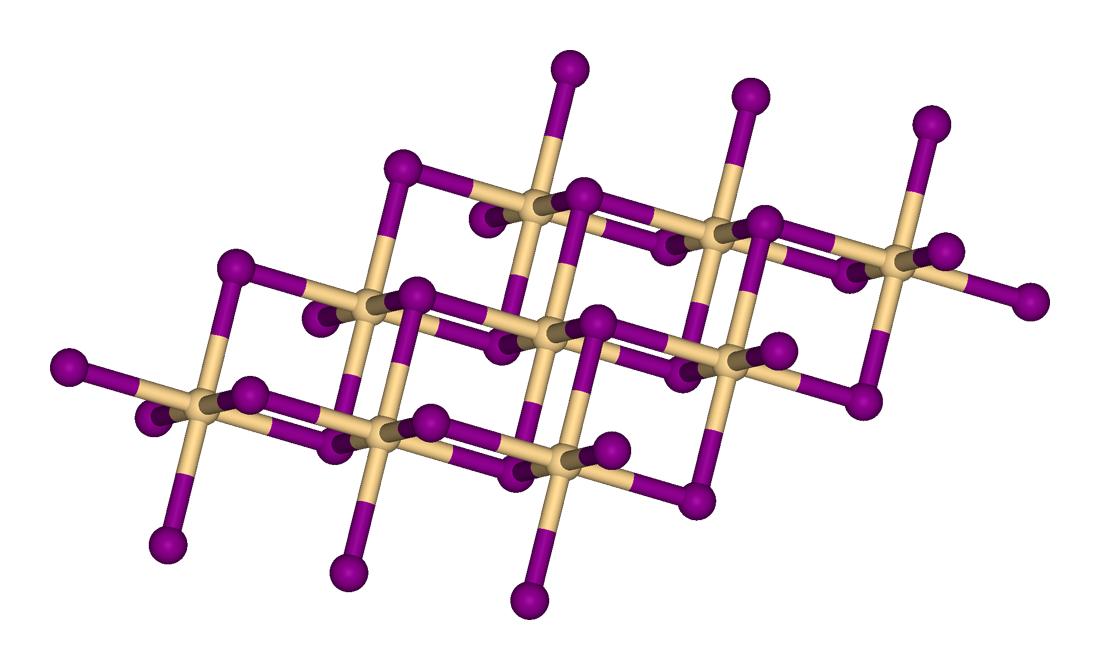
- Calcium iodide

Names
- IUPAC name calcium iodide

Identifiers
CAS Number	10102-68-8; 13640-62-5 (tetrahydrate)
3D model (JSmol)	Interactive image; Interactive image
ChemSpider	59629
ECHA InfoCard	100.030.238
EC Number	233-276-8
PubChem CID	66244
RTECS number	EV1300000
UNII	8EKI9QEE2H
CompTox Dashboard (EPA)	DTXSID2064945
- InChI: InChI=1S/Ca.2HI/h;2*1H/q+2;;/p-2 Key: UNMYWSMUMWPJLR-UHFFFAOYSA-L; InChI=1/Ca.2HI/h;2*1H/q+2;;/p-2 Key: UNMYWSMUMWPJLR-NUQVWONBAC
- SMILES: I[Ca]I; [Ca+2].[I-].[I-]

Properties
Chemical formula	CaI_{2}
Molar mass	293.887 g/mol (anhydrous); 365.95 g/mol (tetrahydrate)
Appearance	white solid
Density	3.956 g/cm^{3} (anhydrous)
Melting point	779 °C (1,434 °F; 1,052 K) (anhydrous)
Boiling point	1,100 °C (2,010 °F; 1,370 K)
Solubility in water	64.6 g/100 mL (0 °C); 66 g/100 mL (20 °C); 81 g/100 mL (100 °C)
Solubility	soluble in acetone and alcohols
Magnetic susceptibility (χ)	−109.0·10^{−6} cm^{3}/mol

Structure
Crystal structure	Rhombohedral, hP3
Space group	P-3m1, No. 164
Coordination geometry	octahedral

Hazards
NFPA 704 (fire diamond)	2 0 1

Related compounds
Other anions	calcium fluoride calcium chloride calcium bromide
Other cations	beryllium iodide magnesium iodide strontium iodide barium iodide
- Except where otherwise noted, data are given for materials in their standard state (at 25 °C [77 °F], 100 kPa). verify (what is ?) Infobox references

Calcium iodide (chemical formula CaI_{2}) is the ionic compound of calcium and iodine. This colourless deliquescent solid is a salt that is highly soluble in water. Its properties are similar to those for related salts, such as calcium chloride. It is used in photography. It is also used in cat food as a source of iodine.

== Reactions ==
Henri Moissan first isolated pure calcium in 1898 by reducing calcium iodide with pure sodium metal:

CaI_{2} + 2 Na → 2 NaI + Ca

Calcium iodide can be formed by treating calcium carbonate, calcium oxide, or calcium hydroxide with hydroiodic acid:

CaCO_{3} + 2 HI → CaI_{2} + H_{2}O + CO_{2}

Calcium iodide slowly reacts with oxygen and carbon dioxide in the air, liberating iodine, which is responsible for the faint yellow color of impure samples.

2 CaI_{2} + 2 CO_{2} + O_{2} → 2 CaCO_{3} + 2 I_{2}
