= Magnesium iodide =

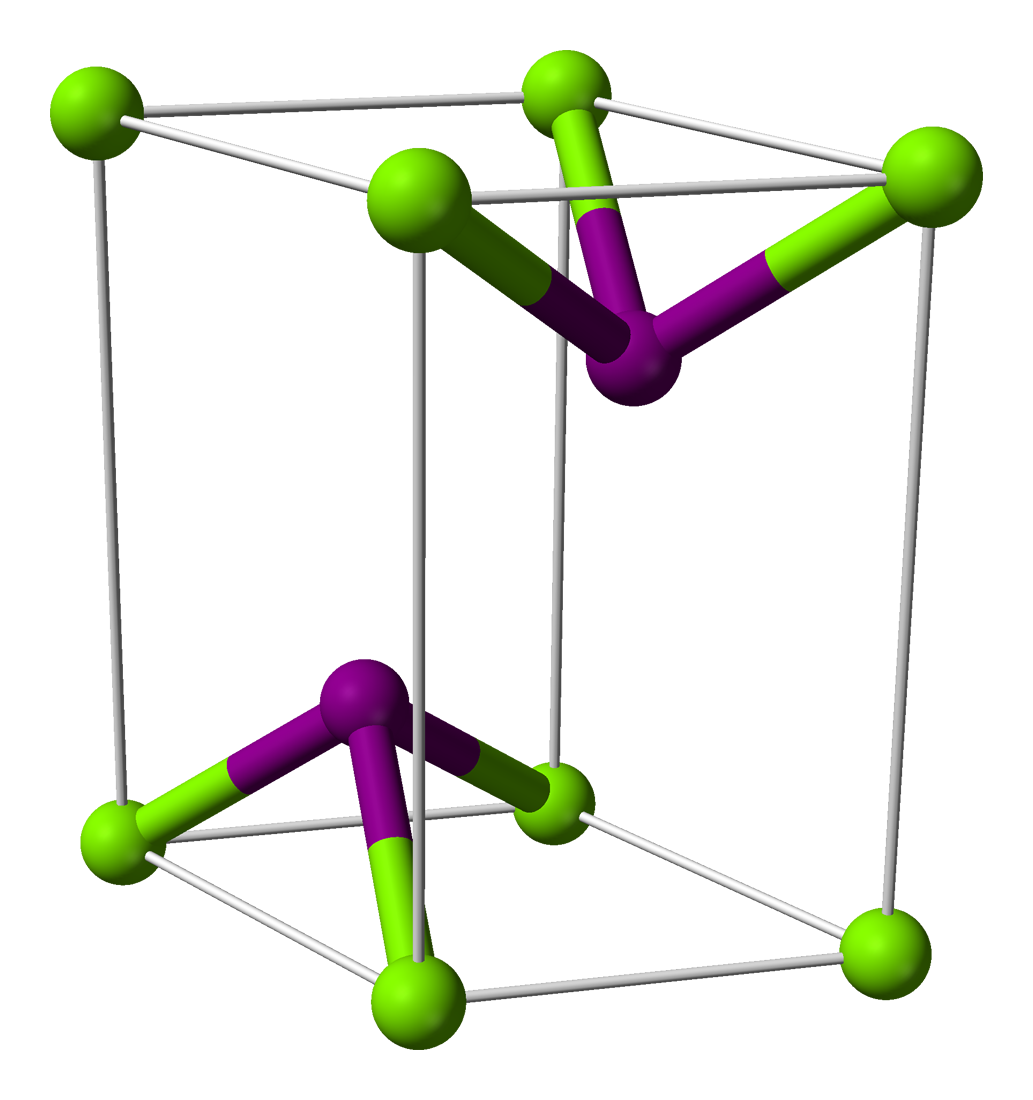

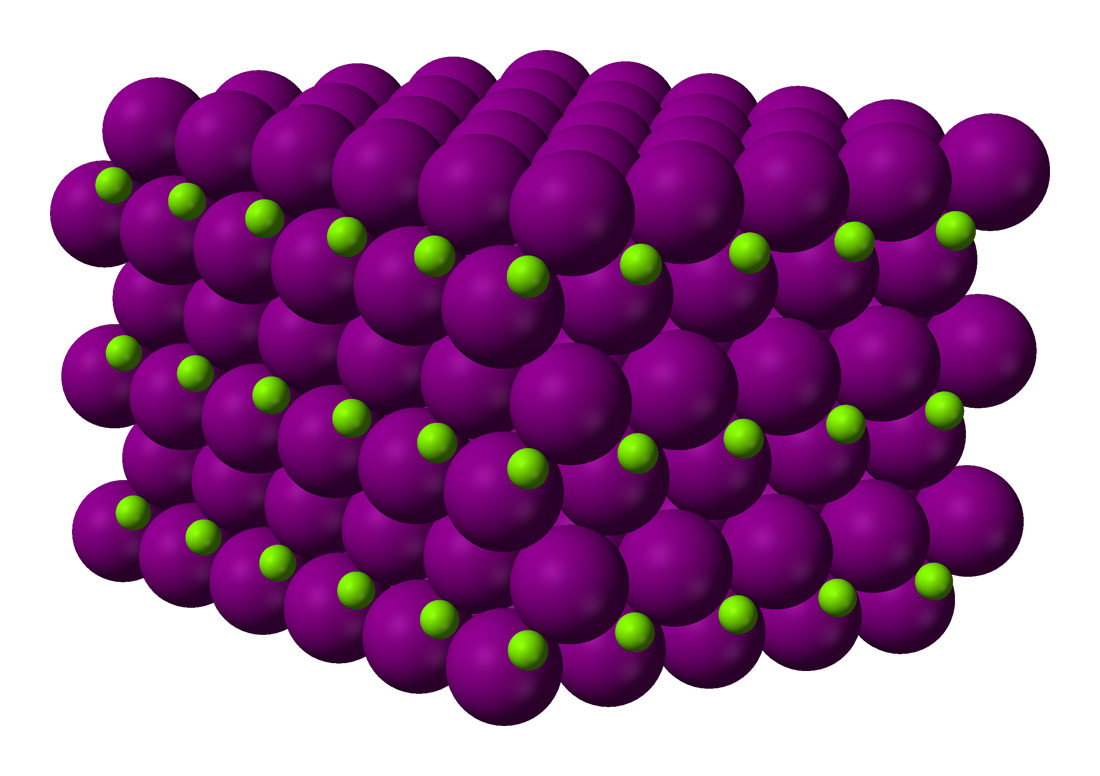

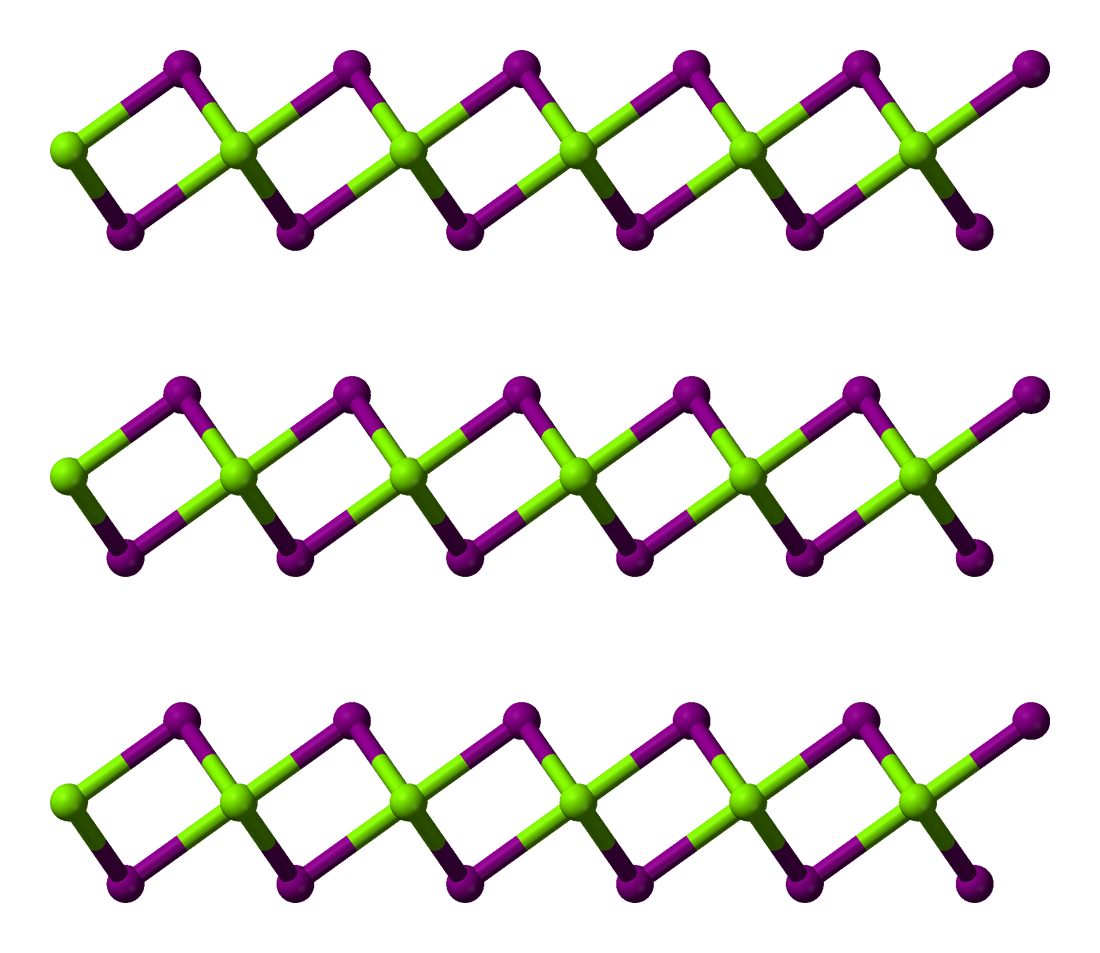

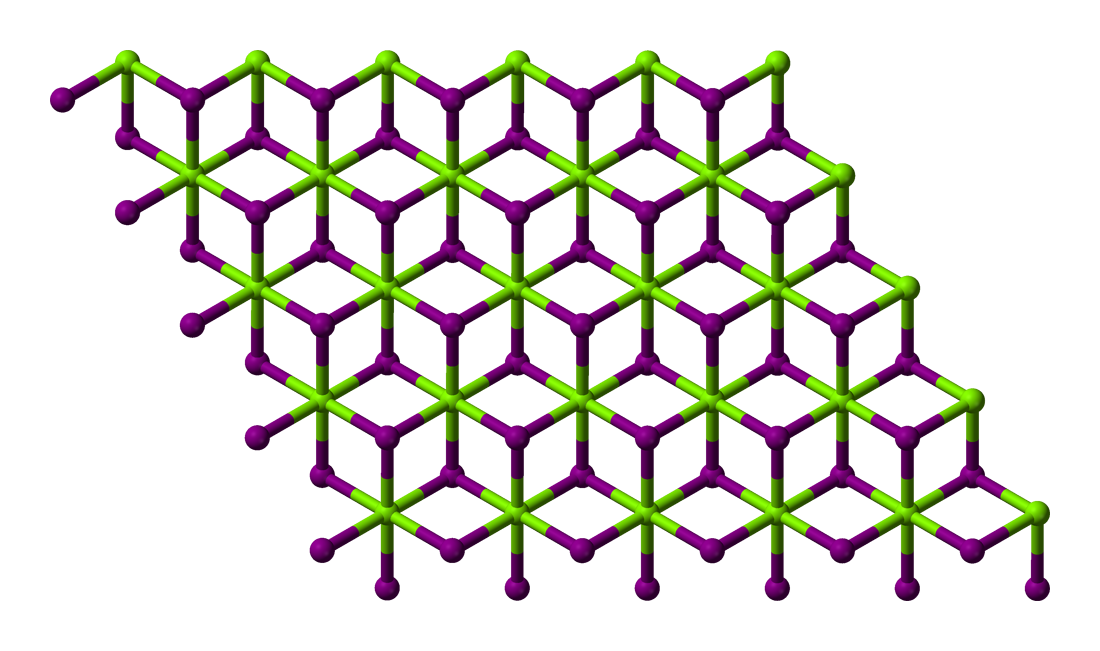

Names
- IUPAC name Magnesium iodide

Identifiers
CAS Number	10377-58-9 (anhydrous); 75535-11-4 (hexahydrate); 7790-31-0 (octahydrate)
3D model (JSmol)	Interactive image; Interactive image
ChemSpider	59700
ECHA InfoCard	100.030.738
EC Number	233-825-1
PubChem CID	66322
UNII	W74QE3H320 (anhydrous); 72I5H6SWMT (octahydrate)
CompTox Dashboard (EPA)	DTXSID6065056
- InChI: InChI=1S/2HI.Mg/h2*1H;/q;;+2/p-2 Key: BLQJIBCZHWBKSL-UHFFFAOYSA-L; InChI=1/2HI.Mg/h2*1H;/q;;+2/p-2 Key: BLQJIBCZHWBKSL-NUQVWONBAV
- SMILES: I[Mg]I; [Mg+2].[I-].[I-]

Properties
Chemical formula	MgI_{2} (anhydrous); MgI_{2}·6H_{2}O (hexahydrate); MgI_{2}·8H_{2}O (octahydrate)
Molar mass	278.1139 g/mol (anhydrous); 386.2005 g/mol (hexahydrate); 422.236 g/mol (octahydrate)
Appearance	white crystalline solid
Odor	odorless
Density	4.43 g/cm^{3} (anhydrous solid); 2.353 g/cm^{3} (hexahydrate solid); 2.098 g/cm^{3} (octahydrate solid)
Melting point	637 °C (1,179 °F; 910 K) (anhydrous, decomposes); 41 °C (octahydrate, decomposes)
Solubility in water	54.7 g/(100 cm^{3}) (anhydrous, 0 °C); 148 g/(100 cm^{3}) (anhydrous, 18 °C); 81 g/(100 cm^{3}) (octahydrate, 20 °C)
Solubility	soluble in ether, alcohol and ammonia
Magnetic susceptibility (χ)	−111.0·10^{−6} cm^{3}/mol

Structure
Crystal structure	Hexagonal (anhydrous); Monoclinic (hexahydrate); Orthorhombic (octahydrate)

Thermochemistry
Heat capacity (C)	74 J/(mol·K)
Std molar entropy (S^{⦵}_{298})	134 J/(mol·K)
Std enthalpy of formation (Δ_{f}H^{⦵}_{298})	−364 kJ/mol

Hazards
- GHS labelling
Pictograms	(GHS07: Exclamation mark)
Signal word	Warning
Hazard statements	H315, H319
NFPA 704 (fire diamond)	3 1 1 COR

Related compounds
Other anions	Magnesium fluoride; Magnesium bromide; Magnesium chloride
Other cations	Beryllium iodide; Calcium iodide; Strontium iodide; Barium iodide
- Except where otherwise noted, data are given for materials in their standard state (at 25 °C [77 °F], 100 kPa). verify (what is ?) Infobox references

Magnesium iodide is an inorganic compound with the chemical formula MgI_{2}. It forms various hydrates MgI_{2}·xH_{2}O. Magnesium iodide is a salt of magnesium and hydrogen iodide. These salts are typical ionic halides, being highly soluble in water.

== Uses ==
Magnesium iodide has few commercial uses, but can be used to prepare compounds for organic synthesis.

== Preparation ==
Magnesium iodide can be prepared from magnesium oxide, magnesium hydroxide, and magnesium carbonate by treatment with hydroiodic acid:

MgO + 2 HI → MgI_{2} + H_{2}O
Mg(OH)_{2} + 2 HI → MgI_{2} + 2 H_{2}O
MgCO_{3} + 2 HI → MgI_{2} + CO_{2} + H_{2}O

== Reactions ==
Magnesium iodide is stable at high heat under a hydrogen atmosphere, but decomposes in air at normal temperatures, turning brown from the release of elemental iodine. When heated in air, it decomposes completely to magnesium oxide.

Another method to prepare MgI_{2} is mixing powdered elemental iodine and magnesium metal. In order to obtain anhydrous MgI_{2}, the reaction should be conducted in a strictly anhydrous atmosphere; dry-diethyl ether can be used as a solvent.

Usage of magnesium iodide in the Baylis-Hillman reaction tends to give (Z)-vinyl compounds.

Demethylation of certain aromatic methyl ethers can be afforded using magnesium iodide in diethyl ether.

== Hydrates ==
Two hydrates are known, the octahydrate and the nonahydrate, both verified by X-ray crystallography These hydrates feature [Mg(H_{2}O)_{6}]^{2+} ions.
