= Radium bromide =

- Radium bromide

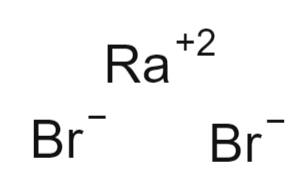

Names
- IUPAC name radium bromide
- Other names radium bromide

Identifiers
CAS Number	10031-23-9
3D model (JSmol)	Interactive image
ChemSpider	20138062
ECHA InfoCard	100.030.066
EC Number	233-086-5
UNII	R74O7T8569
CompTox Dashboard (EPA)	DTXSID40881395
- InChI: InChI=1S/2BrH.Ra/h2*1H;/q;;+2/p-2 Key: GIKWXTHTIQCTIH-UHFFFAOYSA-L; InChI=1/2BrH.Ra/h2*1H;/q;;+2/p-2 Key: GIKWXTHTIQCTIH-NUQVWONBAJ
- SMILES: Br[Ra]Br

Properties
Chemical formula	RaBr_{2}
Molar mass	385.782 g/mol
Appearance	white orthorhombic crystals
Density	5.79 g/cm^{3}
Melting point	728 °C (1,342 °F; 1,001 K)
Boiling point	900 °C (1,650 °F; 1,170 K) sublimes
Solubility in water	70.6 g/100 g at 20°C

Related compounds
Other anions	Radium chloride
Other cations	Beryllium bromide Magnesium bromide Calcium bromide Strontium bromide Barium bromide

Hazards
- Occupational safety and health (OHS/OSH)
Main hazards	Radioactive, highly toxic, explosive, dangerous for the environment
- GHS labelling
Pictograms	(GHS01: Explosive) (GHS06: Toxic) (GHS08: Health hazard) (GHS09: Environmental hazard)
NFPA 704 (fire diamond)	4 0 3
- Except where otherwise noted, data are given for materials in their standard state (at 25 °C [77 °F], 100 kPa). verify (what is ?) Infobox references

Radium bromide is the bromide salt of radium, with the formula RaBr_{2}. It is produced during the process of separating radium from uranium ore. This inorganic compound was discovered by Pierre and Marie Curie in 1898, and the discovery sparked a huge interest in radiochemistry and radiotherapy. Since elemental radium oxidizes readily in air and water, radium salts are the preferred chemical form of radium to work with. Even though it is more stable than elemental radium, radium bromide is still extremely toxic, and can explode under certain conditions.

== History ==
After the Curies discovered radium (in the form of radium chloride) in 1898, scientists began to isolate radium on an industrial scale, with the intent of using it for radiotherapy treatments. Radium salts, including radium bromide, were most often used by placing the chemical in a tube that was then passed over or inserted into diseased tissue in the body. Many of the first scientists to try to determine radium's uses were affected by their exposure to the radioactive material. Pierre Curie went so far as to self-inflict a severe chemical skin reaction by applying a radium source directly to his forearm, which ultimately created a skin lesion. All types of therapeutic tests were performed for different skin diseases including eczema, lichen and psoriasis. Later, it was hypothesized that radium could be used to treat cancerous diseases.

However, during this time frame, radium also gained popularity among pseudoscientific "health remedy" industries, which promoted radium as an essential element that could "heal" and "reinvigorate" cells in the human body and remove poisonous substances. As a result, radium gained popularity as a "health trend" in the 1920s and radium salts were added to food, drinks, clothing, toys, and even toothpaste. Furthermore, many respectable journals and newspapers in the early 1900s published statements claiming that radium posed no health hazard.

The main problem with the growth of interest in radium was the lack of radium on earth itself. In 1913, it was reported that the Radium Institute had four grams of radium total, which at the time was more than half the world supply. Numerous countries and institutions across the world set out to extract as much radium as possible, a time-consuming and expensive task. It was reported in Science magazine in 1919 that the United States had produced approximately 55 grams of radium since 1913, which was also more than half the radium produced in the world at the time. A principal source for radium is pitchblende, which holds a total of 257 mg of radium per ton of U_{3}O_{8}. With so little product recovered from such a large amount of material, it was difficult to extract a large quantity of radium. This was the reason radium bromide became one of the most expensive materials on earth. In 1921, the The Times listed prices of radium equivalent to 17,000,000,000 Euros, whereas one ton of gold was 208,000 Euros and one ton of diamond was 400,000,000 Euros.

Radium bromide was also found to induce phosphorescence at normal temperatures. This led to the US army manufacturing and supplying luminous watches and gun sights to soldiers. It also allowed for the invention of the spinthariscope, which soon became a popular household item.

== Properties ==
Radium bromide is a luminous salt that causes the air surrounding it, even when encased in a tube, to glow a brilliant green and demonstrate all bands of the nitrogen spectrum. It is possible that the effect of the alpha radiation on the nitrogen in the air causes this luminescence. Radium bromide is highly reactive and crystals can sometimes explode, especially if heated. Helium gas evolved from alpha particles can accumulate within the crystals, which can cause them to weaken and rupture.

Radium bromide will crystallize when separated from aqueous solution. It forms a dihydrate, very similar to barium bromide.

== Production ==
Radium is obtained from uranium or pitchblende ores by the "Curie method", which involves two major stages. In the first stage the ore is treated with sulfuric acid dissolves many components. The residue contains, barium, radium, and lead sulfates. The mixture will then be treated with sodium chloride and sodium carbonate to remove the lead. The second stage involves separation of the barium from the radium.

Radium bromide can be obtained from radium chloride by reaction with a stream of hydrogen bromide.

== Hazards ==
Radium bromide, like all radium compounds, is highly radioactive and very toxic. Due to its chemical similarity to calcium, radium tends to accumulate in the bones, where it irradiates the bone marrow and can cause anemia, leukemia, sarcoma, bone cancer, genetic defects, infertility, ulcers, and necrosis. Symptoms of poisoning can take years to develop, by which time it is usually too late for any effective medical treatment. Radium bromide also poses a severe environmental hazard, amplified due to its high solubility in water, and it can bioaccumulate and cause long-lasting damage to organisms.

Radium bromide is highly reactive, and poses an explosion risk. This is, in part, due to self-damage of the crystals by alpha radiation, which weakens the lattice structure.

== Uses ==
Radium and radium salts were commonly used for treating cancer; however, these treatments have been mostly phased out in favor of less toxic chemicals such as technetium or strontium-89. Radium bromide was also used in luminous paint on watches, but its use was ultimately phased out in the 1960-1970s in favor of less dangerous chemicals like promethium and tritium.

== See also ==
- Radiation therapy
- Ionizing radiation
- Radiology
