= Barium iodide =

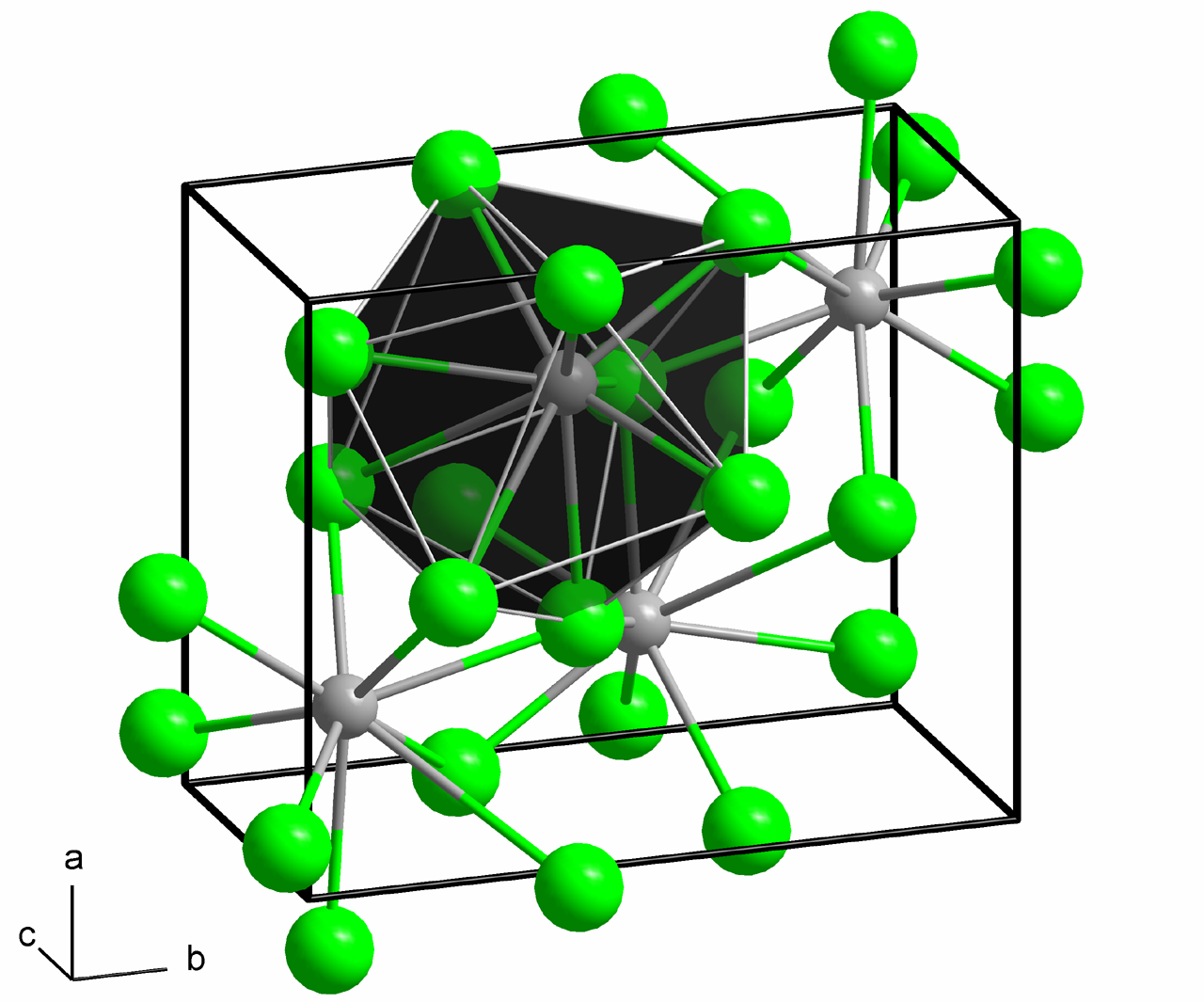

Names
- IUPAC name Barium iodide
- Other names Barium iodide, anhydrous

Identifiers
CAS Number	13718-50-8 (anhydrous); 7787-33-9 (dihydrate); 13477-15-1 (hexahydrate)
3D model (JSmol)	Interactive image; Interactive image
ChemSpider	75507
ECHA InfoCard	100.033.873
EC Number	237-276-9
PubChem CID	83684
UNII	WKC4T7680A
CompTox Dashboard (EPA)	DTXSID2065597
- InChI: InChI=1S/Ba.2HI/h;2*1H/q+2;;/p-2 Key: SGUXGJPBTNFBAD-UHFFFAOYSA-L; InChI=1/Ba.2HI/h;2*1H/q+2;;/p-2 Key: SGUXGJPBTNFBAD-NUQVWONBAS
- SMILES: I[Ba]I; [Ba+2].[I-].[I-]

Properties
Chemical formula	BaI_{2} (anhydrous); BaI_{2}·2H_{2}O (dihydrate)
Molar mass	391.136 g/mol (anhydrous); 427.167 g/mol (dihydrate)
Appearance	White orthorhombic crystals (anhydrous) colorless crystals (dihydrate)
Odor	odorless
Density	5.15 g/cm^{3} (anhydrous); 4.916 g/cm^{3} (dihydrate)
Melting point	711 °C (1,312 °F; 984 K) (anhydrous) decomposes at 740 °C (dihydrate)
Solubility in water	166.7 g/100 mL (0 °C); 221 g/100 mL (20 °C); 246.6 g/100 mL (70 °C)
Solubility	soluble in ethanol, acetone
Magnetic susceptibility (χ)	−124.0·10^{−6} cm^{3}/mol

Structure
Crystal structure	PbCl_{2}-type (Orthorhombic oP12)
Space group	Pnma (No. 62)

Thermochemistry
Std enthalpy of formation (Δ_{f}H^{⦵}_{298})	−602.1 kJ·mol^{−1}

Hazards
- Occupational safety and health (OHS/OSH)
Main hazards	toxic

Related compounds
Other anions	barium fluoride barium chloride barium bromide
Other cations	beryllium iodide magnesium iodide calcium iodide strontium iodide
- Except where otherwise noted, data are given for materials in their standard state (at 25 °C [77 °F], 100 kPa). verify (what is ?) Infobox references

Barium iodide is an inorganic compound with the formula BaI_{2}. The compound exists as an anhydrous and a hydrate (BaI_{2}(H_{2}O)_{2}), both of which are white solids. When heated, hydrated barium iodide converts to the anhydrous salt. The hydrated form is freely soluble in water, ethanol, and acetone.

== Structure ==
The structure of the anhydrous form resembles that of lead(II) chloride with each Ba center bound to nine iodide ligands and has a crystalline packing structure that is quite similar to BaCl_{2}.

== Reactions ==
Anhydrous BaI_{2} can be prepared by treating Ba metal with 1,2-diiodoethane in ether.

BaI_{2} reacts with alkyl potassium compounds to form organobarium compounds.

BaI_{2} can be reduced with lithium biphenyl, to give a highly active form of barium metal.

== Safety ==
Like other soluble salts of barium, barium iodide is toxic.
