= Tellurium compounds =

Any chemical compound containing at least one tellurium atom

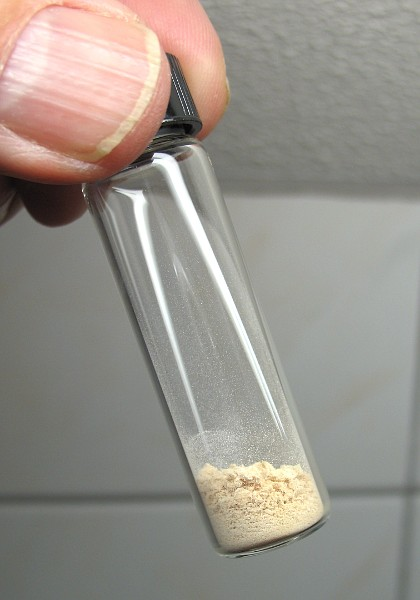
A sample of tellurium dioxide, a compound of tellurium

Tellurium compounds are compounds containing the element tellurium (Te). Tellurium belongs to the chalcogen (group 16) family of elements on the periodic table, which also includes oxygen, sulfur, selenium and polonium: Tellurium and selenium compounds are similar. Tellurium exhibits the oxidation states −2, +2, +3, +4 and +6, with +4 being most common.

== Tellurides ==
Reduction of Te metal produces the tellurides and polytellurides, Te_{n}^{2−}. The −2 oxidation state is exhibited in binary compounds with many metals, such as zinc telluride, ZnTe, produced by heating tellurium with zinc. Decomposition of ZnTe with hydrochloric acid yields hydrogen telluride (H_{2}Te), a highly unstable analogue of the other chalcogen hydrides, H_{2}O, H_{2}S and H_{2}Se:

ZnTe + 2 HCl → ZnCl_{2} + H_{2}Te

H_{2}Te is unstable, whereas salts of its conjugate base [TeH]^{−} are stable.

== Halides ==
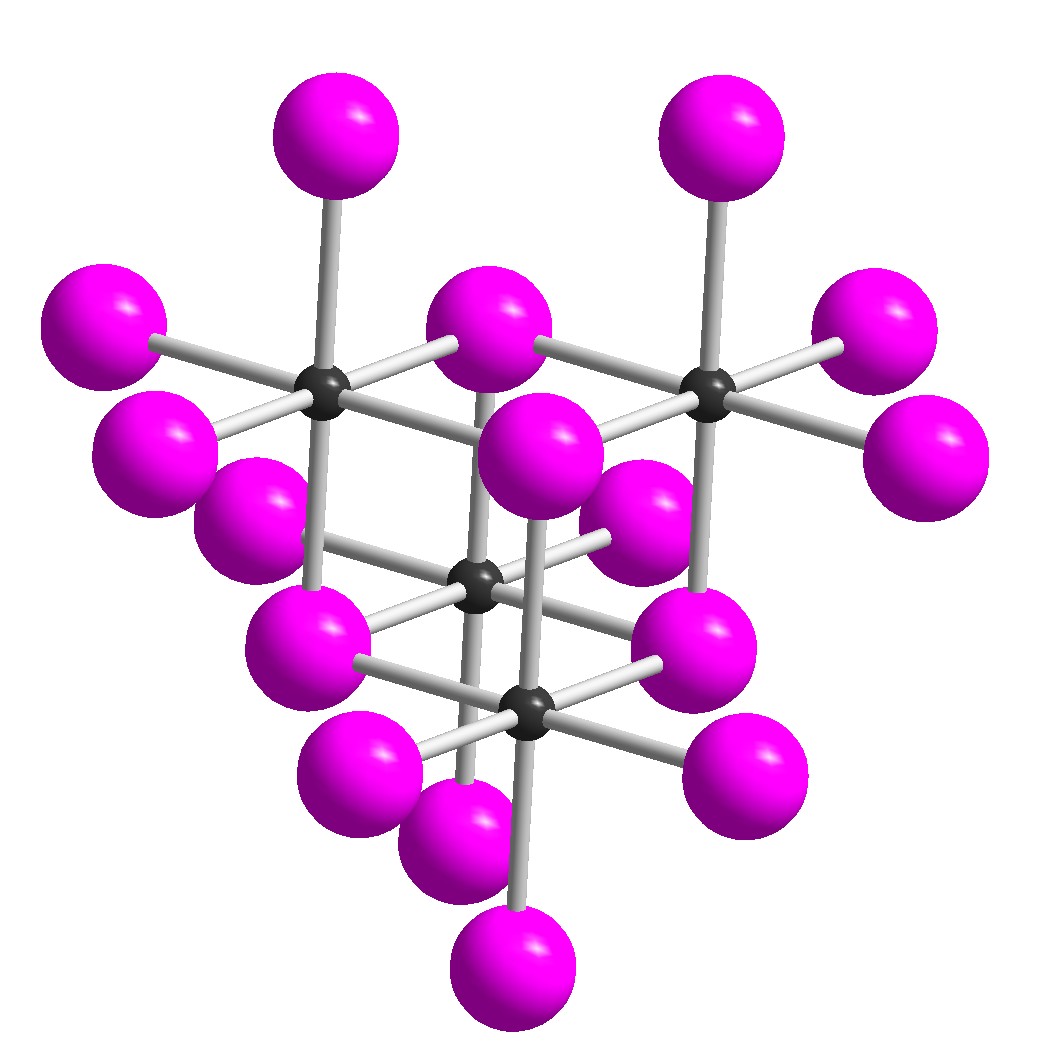
Structure of tellurium tetrachloride, tetrabromide and tetraiodide

The +2 oxidation state is exhibited by the dihalides, TeCl_{2}, TeBr_{2} and TeI_{2}. The dihalides have not been obtained in pure form, although they are known decomposition products of the tetrahalides in organic solvents, and the derived tetrahalotellurates are well-characterized:

Te + X_{2} + 2 X^{−} → TeX^{2−}_{4}

where X is Cl, Br, or I. These anions are square planar in geometry. Polynuclear anionic species also exist, such as the dark brown Te_{2}I^{2−}_{6}, and the black Te_{4}I^{2−}_{14}.

With fluorine Te forms the mixed-valence Te_{2}F_{4} and TeF_{6}. In the +6 oxidation state, the –OTeF_{5} structural group occurs in a number of compounds such as HOTeF_{5}, B(OTeF_{5})_{3}, Xe(OTeF_{5})_{2}, Te(OTeF_{5})_{4} and Te(OTeF_{5})_{6}. The square antiprismatic anion TeF^{2−}_{8} is also attested. The other halogens do not form halides with tellurium in the +6 oxidation state, but only tetrahalides (TeCl_{4}, TeBr_{4} and TeI_{4}) in the +4 state, and other lower halides (Te_{3}Cl_{2}, Te_{2}Cl_{2}, Te_{2}Br_{2}, Te_{2}I and two forms of TeI). In the +4 oxidation state, halotellurate anions are known, such as TeCl^{2−}_{6} and Te_{2}Cl^{2−}_{10}. Halotellurium cations are also attested, including TeI^{+}_{3}, found in TeI_{3}AsF_{6}.

== Oxocompounds ==
Tellurium monoxide was first reported in 1883 as a black amorphous solid formed by the heat decomposition of TeSO_{3} in vacuum, disproportionating into tellurium dioxide, TeO_{2} and elemental tellurium upon heating. Since then, however, existence in the solid phase is doubted and in dispute, although it is known as a vapor fragment; the black solid may be merely an equimolar mixture of elemental tellurium and tellurium dioxide.

Tellurium dioxide is formed by heating tellurium in air, where it burns with a blue flame. Tellurium trioxide, β-TeO_{3}, is obtained by thermal decomposition of Te(OH)_{6}. The other two forms of trioxide reported in the literature, the α- and γ- forms, were found not to be true oxides of tellurium in the +6 oxidation state, but a mixture of Te^{4+}, OH^{−} and O^{−}_{2}. Tellurium also exhibits mixed-valence oxides, Te_{2}O_{5} and Te_{4}O_{9}.

The tellurium oxides and hydrated oxides form a series of acids, including tellurous acid (H_{2}TeO_{3}), orthotelluric acid (Te(OH)_{6}) and metatelluric acid ((H_{2}TeO_{4})_{n}). The two forms of telluric acid form tellurate salts containing the TeO^{2–}_{4} and TeO^{6−}_{6} anions, respectively. Tellurous acid forms tellurite salts containing the anion TeO^{2−}_{3}.

== Other chalcogenides ==
A disulfide, TeS_{2}, forms when tellurous acid (H_{2}TeO_{3}) is mixed with hydrogen sulfide, but is unstable above −20 °C. In contrast, many thiotellurate anions are known, including TeS^{2−}_{3}, Te(S_{5})_{x}(S_{7})^{2-}_{y} (x + y = 2). Many of these arise from the action of tellurium metal on polysulfide anions, although a solid-state synthesis is also possible. Despite their similarities to sulfo-selenide anions, the thiotellurates are not catenation products; instead, the sulfur ligands coordinate to the tellurium as heavier congeners to a tellurate. A thiosubtellurite, TeS^{2−}_{2}, is also known. These compounds are of interest because of their potential for ionic conductivity.

Analogous selenotellurates are also known.

== Nitrides ==
Most compounds with a Te-N bond are explosive, but at least one exception is known.

== Zintl cations ==
When tellurium is treated with concentrated sulfuric acid, the result is a red solution of the Zintl ion, Te^{2+}_{4}.

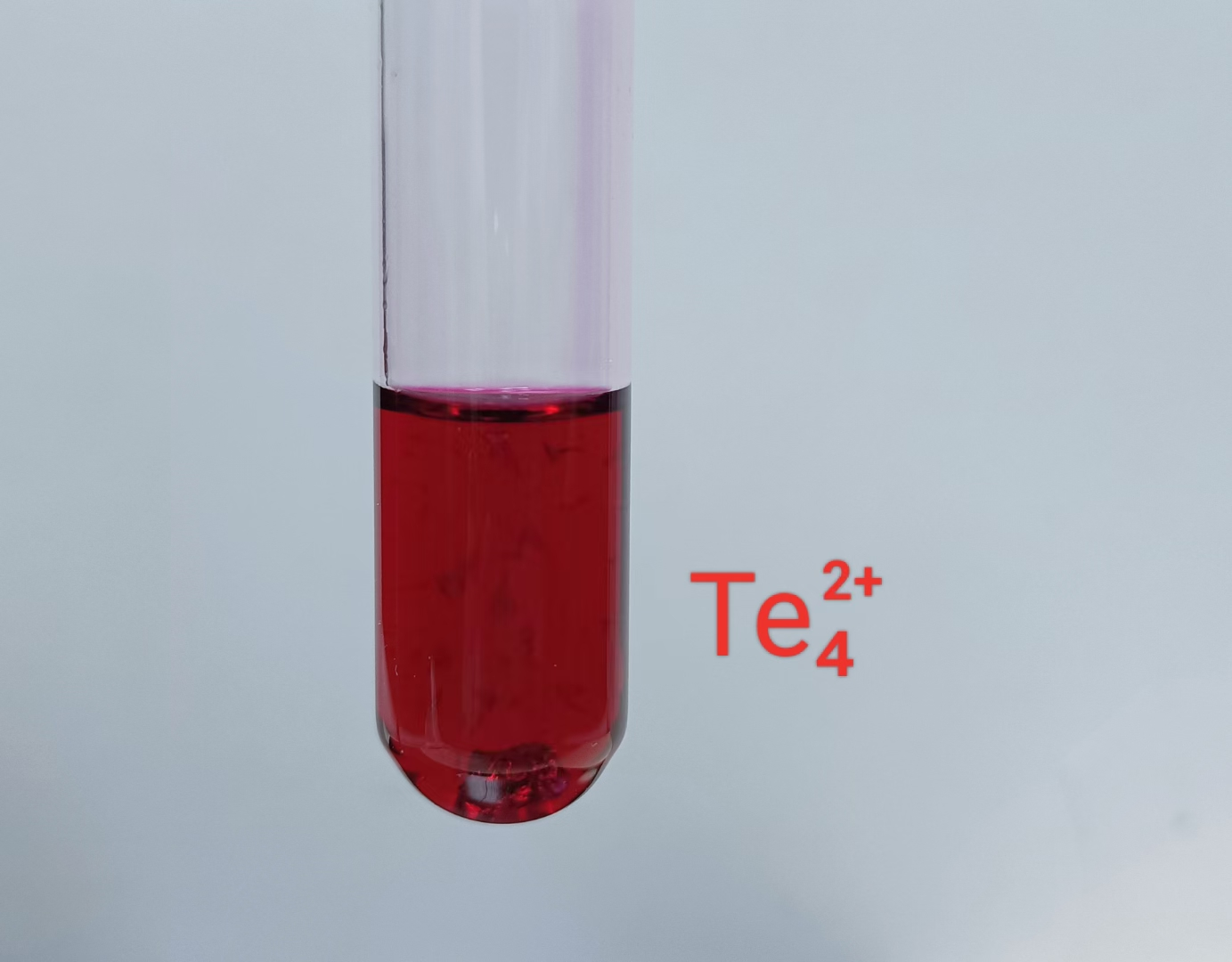
The reaction between tellurium and concentrated sulfuric acid

The oxidation of tellurium by AsF_{5} in liquid SO_{2} produces the same square planar cation, in addition to the trigonal prismatic, yellow-orange Te^{4+}_{6}:

4 Te + 3 AsF_{5} → Te^{2+}_{4}(AsF^{−}_{6})_{2} + AsF_{3}
6 Te + 6 AsF_{5} → Te^{4+}_{6}(AsF^{−}_{6})_{4} + 2 AsF_{3}

Other tellurium Zintl cations include the polymeric Te^{2+}_{7} and the blue-black Te^{2+}_{8}, consisting of two fused 5-membered tellurium rings. The latter cation is formed by the reaction of tellurium with tungsten hexachloride:

8 Te + 2 WCl_{6} → Te^{2+}_{8}(WCl^{−}_{6})_{2}

Interchalcogen cations also exist, such as Te_{2}Se^{2+}_{6} (distorted cubic geometry) and Te_{2}Se^{2+}_{8}. These are formed by oxidizing mixtures of tellurium and selenium with AsF_{5} or SbF_{5}.

== Organotellurium compounds ==
Tellurium does not readily form analogues of alcohols and thiols, with the functional group –TeH, that are called tellurols. The –TeH functional group is also attributed using the prefix tellanyl-. Like H_{2}Te, these species are unstable with respect to loss of hydrogen. Telluraethers (R–Te–R) are more stable, as are telluroxides.

== Tritelluride quantum materials ==
Recently, physicists and materials scientists have been discovering unusual quantum properties associated with layered compounds composed of tellurium that's combined with certain rare-earth elements, as well as yttrium (Y).

These novel materials have the general formula of R Te_{3}, where "R " represents a rare-earth lanthanide (or Y), with the full family consisting of R = Y, La, Ce, Pr, Nd, Sm, Gd, Tb, Dy, Ho, Er & Tm (not yet observed are compounds containing Pm, Eu, Yb & Lu). These materials have a two-dimensional character within an orthorhombic crystal structure, with slabs of R Te separated by sheets of pure Te.

It is thought that this 2-D layered structure is what leads to a number of interesting quantum features, such as charge-density waves, high carrier mobility, superconductivity under specific conditions, and other peculiar properties whose natures are only now emerging.

For example, in 2022, a small group of physicists at Boston College in Massachusetts led an international team that used optical methods to demonstrate a novel axial mode of a Higgs-like particle in R Te_{3} compounds that incorporate either of two rare-earth elements (R = La, Gd). This long-hypothesized, axial, Higgs-like particle also shows magnetic properties and may serve as a candidate for dark matter.

== See also ==
- Sulfur compounds
- Selenium compounds
- Polonium compounds
