= Selenite fluoride =

Class of chemical compounds

A selenite fluoride is a chemical compound or salt that contains fluoride and selenite anions (F^{−} and SeO^{2−}_{3}). These are mixed anion compounds. Some have third anions, including nitrate (NO^{−}_{3}), molybdate (MoO^{2−}_{4}), oxalate (C_{2}O^{2−}_{4}), selenate (SeO^{2−}_{4}), silicate (SiO^{2−}_{4}) and tellurate (TeO^{2−}_{4}).

== Naming ==
A selenite fluoride compound may also be called a fluoride oxoselenate(IV) using IUPAC naming for inorganic compounds.

== Production ==
Rare earth selenite fluorides can be produced by dissolving the rare earth selenate into molten lithium fluoride at over 800°C, whereupon the selenate loses oxygen to become selenite, and crystals of the selenite fluoride can form. Another similar method involves heating the rare earth oxide, with a rare earth fluoride and selenium dioxide with a caesium bromide flux. If glass or silica containers are used, they are eaten away by the molten flux and silicates are formed some of which may be fluoride selenite silicate compounds.

== Related ==
Related to these are the selenite chlorides and selenite bromides by varying the halogenide. Similar compounds by varying the chalcogen also include the sulfite fluorides and tellurite fluorides.

== List ==
name	formula	ratio SeO_{3}:F	mw	system	space group	unit cell Å	volume	density	optical	references
scandium selenite fluoride	ScSeO_{3}F	1:1		triclinic	P1̅ <13	−173°C a=6.2769 b=6.5578 c=4.0627 α=95.478 β=95.332 γ=92.363 Z=2		3.830		
scandium selenite fluoride	ScSeO_{3}F	1:1		monoclinic	P2_{1}/m >13	a=4.0643 b =6.6109 c=6.32.35 β=93.298° Z=2				
	Na_{3}Ti_{3}O_{3}(SeO_{3})_{4}F	4:1		hexagonal	P6_{3}	a =12.8439 c =5.2339			SHG 6 × KDP	
dimanganese difluoride selenite	Mn_{2}SeO_{3}F_{2}	1:2	274.83	orthorhombic	Pnma	a = 7.50848 b = 10.350 and c = 5.47697 Z=4			pink	
ferric difluoride selenite	FeSeO_{3}F	1:1	201.81	monoclinic	P2_{1}/n	a=4.9559 b=5.2023 c=12.040 β=97.87 Z=4	307.50	4.359	yellow	
ammonium diferric trifluoride diselenite	NH_{4}Fe_{2}F_{3}(SeO_{3})_{2}	2:3								
piperizinium	[C_{4}N_{2}H_{12}]Fe_{4}F_{6}(SeO_{3})_{4}	2:3	933.40	monoclinic	C2/c	a=15.168 b=7.3973 c=16.127 β=90.044 Z=5	1928.9	3.14	brown	
diethylenetriamine	[C_{4}N_{3}H_{14}]Fe_{4}F_{6}(SeO_{3})_{4}	2:3								
dicobalt difluoride selenite	Co_{2}SeO_{3}F_{2}	1:2	282.82	orthorhombic	Pnma	a = 7.2655 b = 10.001 c = 5.3564 Z=4	389.22	4.826	pink	
	Ni_{2}(SeO_{3})F_{2}	1:2	282.3	orthorhombic	Pnma	a=7.1727 b=9.9377 c=5.2364	373.25		yellow	
dicopper difluoride selenite	Cu_{2}(SeO_{3})F_{2}	1:2	292.05	orthorhombic	Pnma	a = 7.066 b = 9.590 c = 5.563 Z=4	377.0	5.146	light green	
dizinc difluoride selenite	Zn_{2}(SeO_{3})F_{2}	1:2	295.70	orthorhombic	Pnma	a=7.276 b=10.042 c=5.256 Z=4	384.0	5.114	colourless	
triethylenediamin-di-ium digallium hexafluoride selenite	C_{6}H_{14}N_{2}Ga_{2}F_{6}SeO_{3}	1:6	494.59	Monoclinic	P2_{1}/c	a=12.616 b=7.2700 c=13.605 β=104.746 Z=4	1206.8	2.722	colourless	
ethelenediamin-di-ium gallium trifluoride selenite	C_{2}H_{10}N_{2}GaF_{3}SeO_{3}	1:3	315.80	monoclinic	P2_{1}/c	a=9.1107 b=8.0382 c=10.8302 β=90.045 Z=4	793.1	2.2355	colourless	
piperizin-di-ium gallium fluoride oxalate selenite hydrate	H_{2}pipGaFSeO_{3}[C_{2}O_{4}]H_{2}O	1:1	409.87	triclinic	P1̅	a=6.377 b=9.2820 c=11.4112 α=66.53 β=77.44 γ=71.89	585.47	2.325	colourless	
	(C_{4}H_{15}N_{3})_{2}Ga_{4}F_{2}(SeO_{3})_{6}(C_{2}O_{4}).4H_{2}O	6:2	1467.11	triclinic	P1̅	a=8.9941 b=9.4963 c=11.2959 α=77.13 β=68.073 γ=83.776 Z=1	872.17	2.793	colourless	
	ZnGa(SeO_{3})_{2}F	2:1		monoclinic	P2_{1}/c	a=7.3482 b=12.3498 c=7.7071 β=121.237°			birefringence 0.176 at 546 nm	
	SrAl(SeO_{3})F_{3}	1:3		hexagonal	P6_{3}/m	a=13.2436 c=5.1816				
	Sr(VO_{2}F)(SeO_{3})	1:1	316.52	orthorhombic	Pbca	a=9.7816 b=8.0278 c=12.927 Z=8	1015.07	4.142	yellow	
yttrium selenite fluoride	YSeO_{3}F	1:1		monoclinic	P2_{1}/c <319	a=6.5765 b=6.8971 c=7.1728 β=99.036 Z=4				
yttrium selenite fluoride	YSeO_{3}F	1:1		monoclinc	P 2_{1}/m >319	600° a=6.5840 b=6.9809 c=4.3434 β =95.032 Z=2		3.922		
	Ag_{3}Ti_{3}O_{3}(SeO_{3})_{4}F	4:1	1042.15	hexagonal	P6_{3}	a=12.8975 c=5.2180 Z=2	751.70	4.604	colourless SHG 2×KDP	
	Ag_{2}ZrF_{2}(SeO_{3})_{2}	2:2	598.88	orthorhombic	Cmca	a=7.3640 b=31.451 c=6.2719	1452.6	5.477	colopurless	
dicadmium difluoride selenite	Cd_{2}(SeO_{3})F_{2}	1:2	389.76	orthorhombic	Pnma	a=7.803 b=10.566 c=5.729 Z=4	472.4	5.480	colourless	
ethelenediamin-di-ium indium trifluoride selenite	C_{2}H_{10}N_{2}InF_{3}SeO_{3}	1:3	360.90	monoclinic	P2_{1}/c	a=9.3066 b=8.3012 c=11.2923 Z=4	871.68	2.750	colourless	
caesium triscandium hexafluoride diselenite	CsSc_{3}F_{6}[SeO_{3}]_{2}	2:6		trigonal	P3m1	a = 5.6534 c = 10.6987 Z = 1				
	Cs(TiOF)_{3}(SeO_{3})_{2}	2:3	635.53	hexagonal	P6_{3}mc	a=7.2420 c=11.8152 Z=2	536.65	3.933	Colourless SHG 5xKDP	
caesium triiron hexafluoride diselenite	CsFe_{3}(SeO_{3})_{2}F_{6}	2:6		trigonal	P3̅m1	a=5.459 c=10.537 Z=1	271.9		cyan	
	BaAl(SeO_{3})F_{3}(H_{2}O)_{0.25}	1:3		tetragonal	P4/n	a=14.5731 c=5.0773				
	Ba(VO_{2}F)(SeO_{3})	1:1	366.24	orthorhombic	Pbca	a=10.0539 b=8.3967 c=13.174	1112.18	4.375	yellow	
lanthanum selenite fluoride	LaSeO_{3}F	1:1		monoclinic	P2_{1}/c	a = 18.198 b = 7.1575 c = 8.464 β = 96.89 Z = 12				
cerium selenite fluoride	CeSeO_{3}F	1:1								
tetrapraseodymium selenate diselenite hexafluoride	Pr_{4}(SeO_{3})_{2}(SeO_{4})F_{6}	2:6		monoclinic	C2/c	a = 22.305 b = 7.1054 c = 8.356 β = 98.05° Z = 4				
tripraseodymium fluoride tetraselenite	Pr_{3}F[SeO_{3}]_{4}								pale green	
	Pr_{5}F[SiO_{4}]_{2}[SeO_{3}]_{3}	3:1		triclinic	P1̅	a = 7.0114 b = 9.8268 c = 12.8679 α = 70.552 β = 76.904 γ = 69.417° Z = 2		5.511	pale green	
trineodymium fluoride tetraselenite	Nd_{3}(SeO_{3})_{4}F			hexagonal	P6_{3}mc	a=10.515 c=7.1211				
trisamarium fluoride tetraselenite	Sm_{3}(SeO_{3})_{4}F			hexagonal	P6_{3}mc	a=10.474 c=7.0224				
trigadolinium tetraselenite fluoride	Gd_{3}(SeO_{3})_{4}F	4:1		hexagonal	P6_{3}mc	a = 10.443 b = 6.9432 Z=2				
tridysprosium tetraselenite fluoride	Dy_{3}(SeO_{3})_{4}F	4:1	1014.34	hexagonal	P6_{3}mc	a=10.360 c=6.8647 Z=2				
holmium selenite fluoride	HoSeO_{3}F	1:1		monoclinic	P2_{1}/c	a=6.5784 b=6.8873 c=7.1825 β =99.213 Z=4		6.43		
	Ho_{3}F[SeO_{3}]_{4}	4:1		hexagonal	P6_{3}mc	a = 10.3024 c = 6.8037 Z = 2				
erbium selenite fluoride	ErSeO_{3}F	1:1		monoclinic	P2_{1}/c	a=6.5553 b=6.8741 c=7.1516 β =99.020 Z=4		6.54		
	Er_{3}F[SiO_{4}][SeO_{3}]_{2}	2:1		orthorhombic	Pnna	a = 5.8692 b = 15.2931 c = 10.2967 Z = 4			pink	
thulium selenite fluoride	TmSeO_{3}F	1:1		monoclinic	P2_{1}/c	a=6.5342 b=68607 c=7.1213 β =98,828 Z=4		6.63		
ytterbium selenite fluoride	YbSeO_{3}F	1:1		monoclinic	P2_{1}/c	a=6.5146 b=6.8475 c=7.0924 β =98.637 Z=4		6.77		
Lutetium selenite fluoride	LuF[SeO_{3}]	1:1		monoclinic	P2_{1}/c	−173°C: a=6.4839 b=6.8128 c=7.0581 β=98.657 Z=4	308.23	6.916		
Lutetium selenite fluoride	LuF[SeO_{3}]	1:1		triclinic	P1̅	a=6.4486 b=6.8441 c=4.2798 α=94.063 β=98.657 γ=91.895 Z=2	187.04	5.698		
Lutetium selenite fluoride	LuF[SeO_{3}]	1:1		monoclinic	P2_{1}/m	173°C: a=6.4734 b=6.8702 c=4.2843 β=95.602 Z=2	189.63	5.621		
trilutetium fluoride tetraselenite	Lu_{3}F(SeO_{3})_{4}	4:1	1051.75	trigonal	P6_{3}	a=9.883 c=7.066 Z=2	597.7	5.844	colourless SHG 2.5×KDP	
	PbVO_{2}(SeO_{3})F	1:1	436.09	orthorhombic	Pbca	a=9.812 b=8.147 c=13.026 Z=8	1041.3	5.563	yellow	
	Pb_{2}Ga_{3}F_{6}(SeO_{3})_{2}Cl_{3}·2H_{2}O		1133.84	trigonal	R32	a=7.2103 c=28.232 Z=3	1271.1	4.444	SHG 4.0–4.5 × KDP	
	Pb_{2}Ga_{3}F_{6}(SeO_{3})_{2}Br_{3}·2H_{2}O		1267.22	trigonal	R32	a=7.2307 c=29.057 Z=3	1315.6	4.798	SHG 4.0–4.5 × KDP	
cadmium lead fluoride nitrate selenite	PbCdF(SeO_{3})(NO_{3})	1:1		orthorhombic	Pca2_{1}	a=11.121 b=10.366 c=5.3950 Z=4	621.9	5.634	SHG 2.6×KDP band gap 4.42 eV	
bismuth selenite fluoride	BiFSeO_{3}	1:1	354.94	orthorhombic	Pca2_{1}	a=6.6774 b=6.8872 c=7.4702 Z=4	343.54	6.862	colourless SHG 13.5×KDP	
tribismuth triselenite pyroselenite fluoride	Bi_{3}(SeO_{3})_{3}(Se_{2}O_{5})F	3:1		monoclinic	F21				SHG 3×KDP	
dibismuth potassium pentafluoride selenite	KBi_{2}SeO_{3}F_{5}	1:5	679.02	orthorhombic	Pbcm	a=4.553 b=17.80 c=8.80 Z=4	712.9	6.326	white band gap 4.08 eV	
dibismuth rubidium pentafluoride selenite	RbBi_{2}SeO_{3}F_{5}	1:5	725.39	Triclinic	P1̅	a=8.842 b=8.917 c=9.63 α=88.28 β=89.82 γ=89.76 Z=4	758.9	6.349	white band gap 4.18 eV	
	RbBi(SeO_{3})F_{2}	1:2	459.41	orthorhombic	Pnma	a=13.251 b=6.073 c=6.780 Z=4	545.6			
	Bi_{4}TiO_{2}F_{4}(SeO_{3})_{4}	4:4	1499.66	monoclinic	P2_{1}/c	a=7.0237 b=6.6824 c=17.3240 β=106.637 Z=2	779.07	6.393	colourless	
	Bi_{4}NbO_{3}F_{3}(SeO_{3})_{4}	4:3	1541.67	monoclinic	P2_{1}/c	a=7.0448 b=6.6814 c=17.4051 β=106.931 Z=2	783.73	6.533	colourless	
	Bi_{4}TeO_{4}F_{2}(TeO_{3})_{2}(SeO_{3})_{2}	2:2	1670.64	monoclinic	P2_{1}/c	a=7.0304 b=6.6782 c=17.355 β=106.155 Z=2	782.66	7.089	colourless	
	Bi_{2}F_{2}(MoO_{4})(SeO_{3})	1:2	742.86	monoclinic	P2_{1}/c	a=7.1005 b=9.660 c=12.972 β=12.091 Z=4	753.82	6.546	colourless	
	Bi_{2}ZrO_{2}F_{2}(SeO_{3})_{2}	2:2	833.10	triclinic	P1̅	a=5.8047 b=6.3469 c=6.7419 α=77.665 β=71.365 γ=72.795 Z=1	222.87	6.207	colourless	
	PbBi(SeO_{3})_{2}F	2:1		orthorhombic	Pca2_{1}	a=12.9672 b=4.5022 c=11.8221			SHG 10.5×KDP; band gap 3.75 eV	

SHG=second harmonic generator
