= Sodium hydrogen selenite =

Names
- Other names: Sodium biselenite; Sodium hydrogen selenite; Sodium hydroselenite; Sodium hydrogenselenite

Identifiers
| CAS Number | 7782-82-3 |
| 3D model (JSmol) | Interactive image |
| ChEMBL | ChEMBL2028294 |
| ChemSpider | ID56414 |
| ECHA InfoCard | 100.029.060 |
| EC Number | 231-966-3 |
| PubChem CID | 23669629 |
| UNII | HIM8PP9M79 |
| CompTox Dashboard (EPA) | DTXSID2064814 |
- InChI: InChI=1S/Na.H2O3Se/c;1-4(2)3/h;(H2,1,2,3)/q+1;/p-1 Key: OHYAUPVXSYITQV-UHFFFAOYSA-M
- SMILES: O[Se](=O)[O-].[Na+]

Properties
| Chemical formula | HNaO_{3}Se |
| Molar mass | 150.966 g·mol^{−1} |
| Solubility in water | Soluble |
| Conjugate acid | Selenous acid |

Hazards
- GHS labelling
| Pictograms | (GHS06: Toxic) (GHS08: Health hazard) (GHS09: Environmental hazard) |
| Signal word | Warning |
| Hazard statements | H301, H331, H373, H410 |
| Precautionary statements | P260, P264, P270, P271, P273, P301+P316, P304+P340, P316, P319, P321, P330, P391, P403+P233, P405, P501 |

Related compounds
| Related compounds | sodium selenite; sodium bisulfite |
- Except where otherwise noted, data are given for materials in their standard state (at 25 °C [77 °F], 100 kPa). Infobox references

Sodium hydrogen selenite

Sodium hydrogen selenite is an inorganic chemical consisting of a ratio of one hydrogen, one sodium, three oxygen, and one selenium atom.

It is the sodium salt of the conjugate base of selenous acid. This compound finds therapeutic application for providing the essential trace element selenium. Its preparation involves reacting sodium hydroxide with selenium dioxide.
