= Selenium acid =

Selenium acid may refer to either of the following:

- Selenious acid, H_{2}SeO_{3}
- Selenic acid, H_{2}SeO_{4}
- Hydroselenic acid, H_{2}Se
