= 2C-Te =

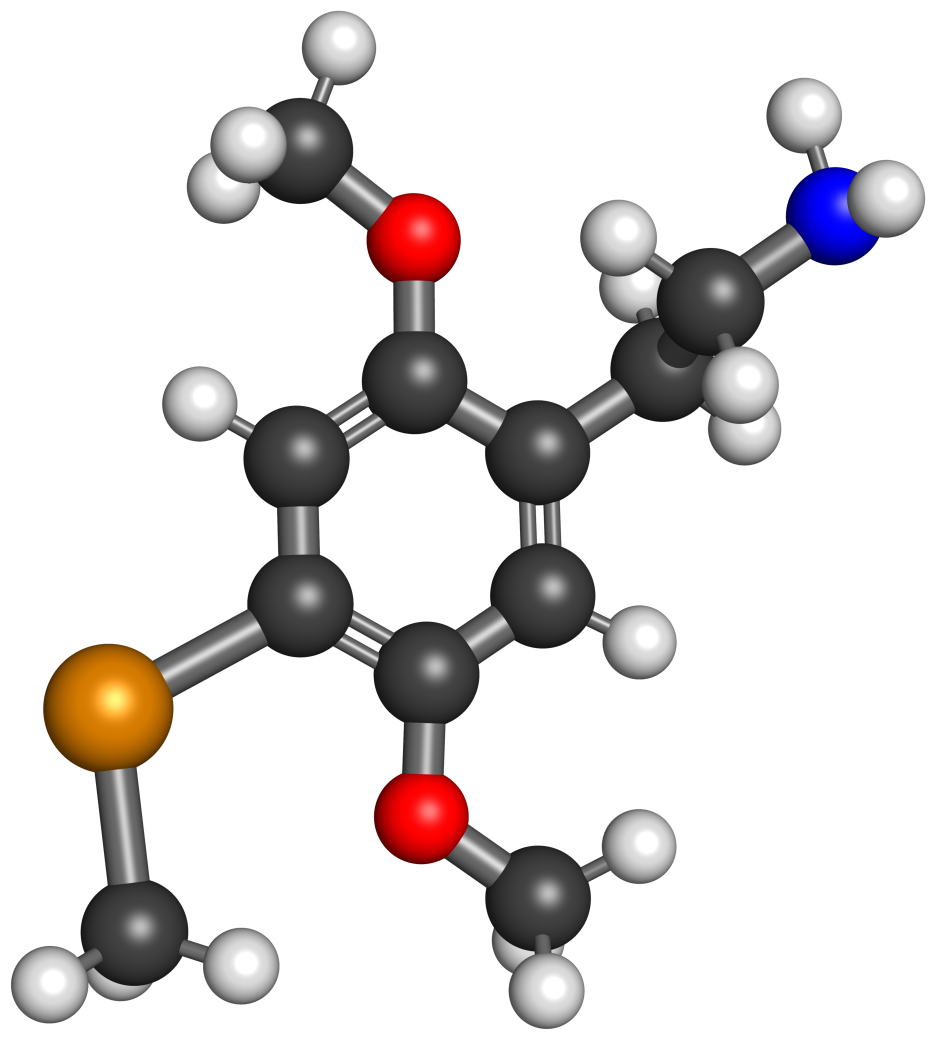

Clinical data
- Other names: 2C-TE; 2,5-Dimethoxy-4-methyltellurophenethylamine; 4-Methyltelluro-2,5-dimethoxyphenethylamine
- ATC code: None

Identifiers
- IUPAC name: 2-[2,5-Dimethoxy-4-(methyltellanyl)phenyl]ethan-1-amine

Chemical and physical data
- Formula: C_{11}H_{17}NO_{2}Te
- Molar mass: 322.86 g·mol^{−1}
- 3D model (JSmol): Interactive image
- SMILES: NCCc1cc(OC)c(cc1OC)[Te]C
- InChI: InChI=1S/C11H17NO2Te/c1-13-9-7-11(15-3)10(14-2)6-8(9)4-5-12/h6-7H,4-5,12H2,1-3H3; Key:OLHAAXPQNWOKOE-UHFFFAOYSA-N

2C-Te, also known as 2,5-dimethoxy-4-methyltellurophenethylamine, is a chemical compound of the phenethylamine and 2C families. It is the analogue of the psychedelic drug 2C-Se in which the selenium (Se) atom has been replaced with a tellurium (Te) atom. These elements are chalcogens, with tellurium following vertically after oxygen (O), sulfur (S), and selenium on the periodic table. Other related compounds in the 2C-Se and 2C-Te series include 2C-O and 2C-T.

In his 1991 book PiHKAL (Phenethylamines I Have Known and Loved), Alexander Shulgin synthesized and described the effects of 2C-Se. He also mentioned 2C-Te in the 2C-Se entry, and said that it would be a readily makeable compound, but did not synthesize it. In 2024, 2C-Se-TFM was synthesized and described by Josh Hartsel and colleagues. An unusual property of selenium and tellurium and compounds containing them is that they are often extremely foul-smelling as well as toxic.

In 2025, journalist and researcher Hamilton Morris disclosed that he was working on synthesis of 2C-Te and/or 2C-Te-TFM in hopes of creating the world's first tellurium-containing psychedelic. He also mentioned that he would be releasing a documentary on this effort. Morris has described this synthesis work as extremely challenging and difficult, due to the synthetic complexity and because of compounds involved in the synthesis being unstable and very foul-smelling.

2C-Te is a controlled substance in Canada under phenethylamine blanket-ban language. It is not an explicitly controlled substance in the United States, but could be considered a controlled substance under the Federal Analogue Act if intended for human consumption.

== See also ==
- 2C (psychedelics)
- Tellurium compounds
- 2C-T-TFM
- FP-LAD
