= Tellurite methyltransferase =

Enzyme

Identifiers
- EC no.: 2.1.1.265

Databases
- IntEnz: IntEnz view
- BRENDA: BRENDA entry
- ExPASy: NiceZyme view
- KEGG: KEGG entry
- MetaCyc: metabolic pathway
- PRIAM: profile
- PDB structures: RCSB PDB PDBe PDBsum
Search
- PMC: articles
- PubMed: articles
- NCBI: proteins

Tellurite methyltransferase (EC 2.1.1.265, TehB) is an enzyme with systematic name S-adenosyl-L-methionine:tellurite methyltransferase. This enzyme catalyses the following chemical reaction

S-adenosyl-L-methionine + tellurite $\rightleftharpoons$ S-adenosyl-L-homocysteine + methanetelluronate

The enzyme is involved in the detoxification of tellurite.
