= Iron(III) selenite =

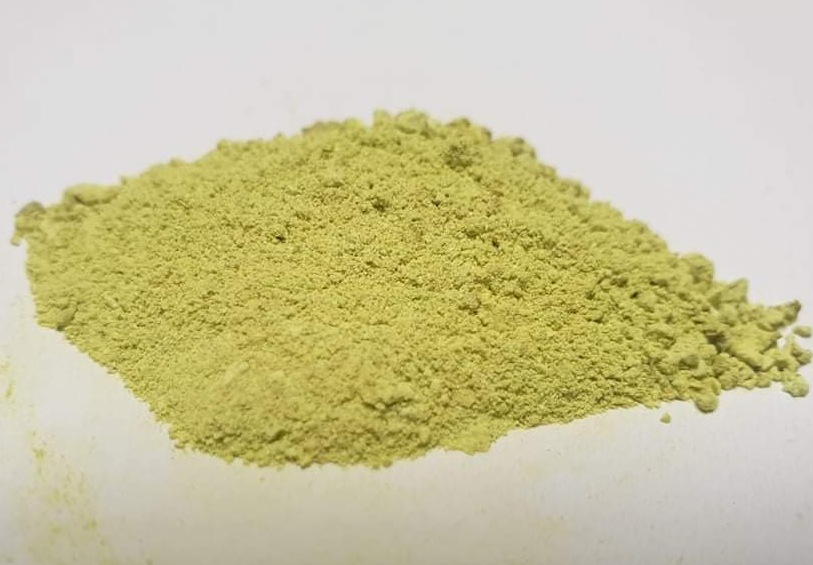
- Iron(III) selenite heptahydrate

Identifiers
CAS Number	anhydrous: 15857-44-0; trihydrate: 41124-06-5; pentahydrate: 28184-72-7; heptahydrate: 31745-39-8
3D model (JSmol)	anhydrous: Interactive image; trihydrate: Interactive image; pentahydrate: Interactive image; heptahydrate: Interactive image
ChemSpider	anhydrous: 13950567
PubChem CID	anhydrous: 15804695
- InChI: InChI=1S/2Fe.3H2O3Se/c;;3*1-4(2)3/h;;3*(H2,1,2,3)/q2*+3;;;/p-6 Key: KWCBONPMAFANBV-UHFFFAOYSA-H
- SMILES: anhydrous: [Fe+3].[Fe+3].[O-][Se](=O)[O-].[O-][Se](=O)[O-].[O-][Se](=O)[O-]; trihydrate: [Fe+3].[Fe+3].[O-][Se](=O)[O-].[O-][Se](=O)[O-].[O-][Se](=O)[O-].O.O.O; pentahydrate: [Fe+3].[Fe+3].[O-][Se](=O)[O-].[O-][Se](=O)[O-].[O-][Se](=O)[O-].O.O.O.O.O; heptahydrate: [Fe+3].[Fe+3].[O-][Se](=O)[O-].[O-][Se](=O)[O-].[O-][Se](=O)[O-].O.O.O.O.O.O.O

Properties
Chemical formula	Fe_{2}(SeO_{3})_{3}
Appearance	yellow crystals (trihydrate)
Density	3.537 g·cm^{−3} (trihydrate)

Structure
Crystal structure	R3c (No.161) (trihydrate)
- Except where otherwise noted, data are given for materials in their standard state (at 25 °C [77 °F], 100 kPa). Infobox references

Iron(III) selenite is an inorganic compound with the chemical formula Fe_{2}(SeO_{3})_{3}. It exists in anhydrous form and as various hydrates.

== Structure ==
The pentahydrate has the structure of Fe_{2}(OH)_{3}(H_{2}O)_{2}(HSeO_{3})_{3}. Single-crystal X-ray diffraction of the trihydrate shows that its structure consists of two independent FeO_{6} octahedrons and SeO_{3}^{2−} with a tetrahedral geometry.

== Preparation ==
The heptahydrate is produced by the reaction of ferric chloride and selenous acid (or sodium selenite) at a pH of 1.05.

== Reactions ==
The anhydrous salt decomposes into Fe_{2}O_{3}·2SeO_{2} at 534 °C, generates 4Fe_{2}O_{3}·SeO_{2} at 608 °C, and finally obtains Fe_{2}O_{3} at 649 °C.
