= Selenite sulfate =

Class of chemical compounds

Selenite sulfates are mixed anion compounds containing both selenite (SeO_{3}^{2−}) and sulfate (SO_{4}^{2−}) anions.

They have transparent crystals that may be coloured by cations. Selenite sulfate minerals are known including pauladamsite and munakataite.

== List ==
Name	Formula	Ratio SeO_{3}:SO_{4}	MW	System	Space group	Unit cell dimensions (Å) and internal angles	Unit cell volume Å^{3}	Density	Comments	Refs
	Na_{8}(SeO_{3})(SO_{4})_{3}	1:3		orthorhombic	Pna2_{1}	a=9.275 b=21.628 c=6.905			SHG 1.2 × KDP; birefringence 0.041 at 532 nm	
	Na_{2}(H_{2}SeO_{3})(SO_{4})	1:1		monoclinic	P2_{1}/c	a=8.461 b=6.7563 c=10.880 β =90.13°				
	K_{4}(H_{2}SeO_{3})(HSO_{4})_{2}(SO_{4})	1:3		triclinic	P1̅	a=7.4183 b=7.4833 c=14.413 α=89.915° β=86.814° γ=71.659°				
	Co_{3}(SeO_{3})(SO_{4})(OH)_{2}	1:1		orthorhombic	Pnma	a=10.8757 b=6.4782 c=11.1579				
	Cu_{4}O(SeO_{3})(SO_{4})_{2}	1:2		triclinic	P1̅	a = 8.379 b = 8.402 c = 8.497 α = 82.99° β = 61.006° γ = 62.10°				
Pauladamsite	Cu_{4}(SeO_{3})(SO_{4})(OH)_{4}·2H_{2}O	1:1		triclinic	P1̅	a = 6.0742 b = 8.415 c = 10.780 α = 103.665 β = 95.224 γ = 90.004° Z = 2	533.0		green	
	Cd_{4}(SeO_{3})_{2}(SO_{4})_{2}			orthorhombic	P2_{1}2_{1}2_{1}	a=5.3524 b=14.595 c=15.892				
	Ag_{2}Cd(Se_{2}O_{5})(Se_{0.3}S_{0.7}O_{4})			triclinic	P1̅	a 6.7485 b 6.8504 c 9.769, α 101.36° β 105.95° γ 91.16°				
	Pr_{2}(SeO_{3})_{2}(SO_{4})(H_{2}O)_{2}	2:1		monoclinic	C2	a=11.719 b=6.8495 c=6.5043 β=103.265 Z=2	508.18	4.364	light green	
	Sm_{2}(SeO_{3})_{2}(SO_{4})(H_{2}O)_{2}	2:1		monoclinic	C2					
	Dy_{2}(SeO_{3})_{2}(SO_{4})(H_{2}O)_{2}	2:1		monoclinic	C2					
	Yb_{2}(SeO_{3})_{2}(SO_{4})(H_{2}O)_{2}			monoclinic	C2					
	Hg_{2}(SeO_{3})(SO_{4})			monoclinic	P2_{1}/c	a 6.3799 b 7.0185 c 13.4426 β 94.511°			birefringence 0.133 at 532 nm and 0.126 at 1064 nm	
	Hg_{3}(SeO_{3})_{2}(SO_{4})			monoclinic	P2_{1}	a 8.1991 b 5.2677 c 11.1199 β 108.399(6)°			white; band gap (4.70 eV; SHG 1.3 ×KDP)	
	La_{2}Hg_{3}(SeO_{3})_{4}(SO_{4})_{2}(H_{2}O)_{2}			triclinic	P1̅	a 9.1127 b 9.2446 c 13.5562 α 86.099° β 79.267° γ 61.814°				
Munakataite	Pb_{2}Cu_{2}(Se^{4+}O_{3})(SO_{4})(OH)_{4}			monoclinic	P2_{1}/m	a = 9.802 b = 5.675 c = 9.281 β = 102.443 Z = 2	504.2			
