= Tellurite fluoride =

Class of chemical compounds

A tellurite fluoride is a mixed anion compound containing tellurite and fluoride ions. They have also been called oxyfluorotellurate(IV) where IV is the oxidation state of tellurium in tellurite.

Comparable compounds are sulfite fluorides or selenite fluorides.

== List ==
name	formula	ratio TeO_{3}:F	mw	crystal system	space group	unit cell Å	volume	density	optical	comment	references
	Li_{7}(TeO_{3})_{3}F				P6_{3}	a =11.4178 c =4.8433				band gap 4.75 eV	
	KTe_{3}O_{6}F	3:1		rhombohedral	R3̅	a=9.486, c=13.774, Z=6					
	ScTeO_{3}F		239.56	orthorhombic	Pnma	a = 5.7740 b = 22.062 c = 5.500	700.6		colourless		
titanium(IV) tellurium(IV) trioxide difluoride	TiTeO_{3}F_{2}	1:1	361.50	orthorhombic	Pnma	a = 7.392 b = 16.369 c=6.4886 Z=8	785.1		colourless		
divanadium(IV) ditellurium(IV) heptaoxide difluoride	V_{2}Te_{2}O_{7}F_{2}	2:2	507.38	triclinic	P1̅	a = 4.882 b = 5.112 c = 7.243 α = 108.17° β = 91.64° γ = 92.63°	171.4		green-brown		
	Cr^{III}TeO_{3}F	1:1									
	FeTeO_{3}F	1:1	250.45	monoclinic	P2_{1}/n	a = 5.0667 b = 5.0550 c = 12.397 β = 97.63° Z=4	314.72		green		
	Co_{2}TeO_{3}F_{2}	1:2	331.46	orthorhombic	Pnma	a=7.3810 b=10.1936 c=5.3013 Z=4	398.86	5.520	purple		
	Co_{15}F_{2}(TeO_{3})_{14}	14:2	3380.35	trigonal	R3̅	a =11.6649 c =27.317 Z=3	3219.1	5.231	blue		
	Cu_{7}(TeO_{3})_{6}F_{2}	6:2		triclinic	P1̅	a =4.9844 b =9.4724 c =9.958, α =82.318° β =76.275° γ =78.847°					
	GaTeO_{3}F	1:1		monoclinic	P2_{1}/n	a = 5.0625 b = 4.9873 c = 12.166 β = 97.952 (13)° Z=4	304.22		colourless		
	RbTe_{3}O_{6}F	3:1									
	InTeO_{3}F	1:1	309.42			a = 7.939 b = 5.3867 c = 8.053 β = 91.06°	344.35		colourless		
	InTe_{2}O_{5}F	2:1		orthorhombic	Cmmm	a = 7.850, b = 27.637, c = 4.098, Z = 4	889.1				
	In_{3}TeO_{3}F_{7}	1:7		orthorhombic	Cmmm	a = 7.850(2) A, b = 27.637(6) A, c = 4.098					
	In_{3}(SO_{4})(TeO_{3})_{2}F_{3}(H_{2}O)				P2_{1}2_{1}2_{1}	a =8.3115 b =9.4341 c =14.807				band gap 4.10 eV	
	BaF_{2}TeF_{2}(OH)_{2}				Pmn2_{1}				SHG ~3 × KDP	fluorotellurite	
	Ba_{2}Ga_{3}F_{3}(Te_{6}F_{2}O_{16})					a =8.8753 b =8.8753 c =11.655				band gap 4.4 eV	
	Ba(MoOF_{2})(TeO_{4})	1:2	478.87	monoclinic	P2_{1}/c	a 5.4281 b 10.1306 c 12.3186 β 116.145° Z=4	608.09	5.231	colourless		
	Ba(MoO_{2}F)_{2}(TeO_{3})_{2}	2:2	782.42	orthorhombic	Aba2	a=12.5605 b=11.0264 c=7.2858 Z=4	1009.1	5.150	colourless		
	Ba(WOF_{2})(TeO_{4})		566.77	monoclinic	P2_{1}/c	a 5.4483 b 10.0179 c 12.3134 β 115.422(6)° Z=4	607.00	6.202	green		
	Pb_{2}Al_{3}F_{3}(Te_{6}F_{2}O_{16})			orthorhombic	P4/mbm	a =8.7627 b =8.7627 c =11.235				band gap 4.1 eV	
	PbVTeO_{5}F		484.73	orthorhombic	Pbca	a=9.8976 b=8.0685 c=13.070	1043.8	6.169	orange; birefringence 0.142 at 590 nm		
	Pb_{2}Ga_{3}F_{3}(Te_{6}F_{2}O_{16})			orthorhombic	P4/mbm	a =8.8439 b =8.8439 c =11.580				band gap 4.2 eV	
	Bi_{4}TeO_{4}F_{2}(TeO_{3})_{2}(SeO_{3})_{2}	2:2	1670.64	monoclinic	P2_{1}/c	a=7.0304 b=6.6782 c=17.355 β=106.155 Z=2	782.66	7.089	colourless		
