= Nitrate selenite =

The nitrate selenites are mixed anion compounds containing distinct nitrate (NO_{3}^{−})and selenite (SO_{3}^{2−}) groups. The compounds are colourless unless coloured by cations.

== List ==
formula	formula weight	crystal system	space group	unit cell Å	volume	density	comment	reference
[Cu(HSeO_{3})_{2}(NO_{3})_{2}]^{2−}•2NH_{4}^{+}•NH_{4}NO_{3}		orthorhombic	Pnma	a=8.8813 b=24.01 c=7.2195				
(RbNO_{3})_{2}[Cu(HSeO_{3})_{2}]		monoclinic	P2_{1}/c	a=9.2833 b=7.1193 c=9.0315 β=91.643°				
Ag_{5}Cu_{2}(NO_{3})(SeO_{3})_{4}	1326.26	triclinic	P1̅	a=5.148 b=7.050 c=10.540 α=73.09° β=89.08° γ=88.50°	365.85	5.61		
Cd(HSeO_{3})NO_{3}	302.38	orthorhombic	Pbca	a=6.359 b=8.945 c=16.648 Z=8	949.1	4.23		
(CsNO_{3})[Cu(HSeO_{3})_{2}]		orthorhombic	Pnma	a=8.891 b=13.859 c=7.249				
Gd(NO_{3})(Se_{2}O_{5})•3H_{2}O		orthorhombic	P2_{1}2_{1}2_{1}	a=6.2509 b=7.0944 c=20.747			SHG 0.2 × KDP	
Lu(SeO_{3})(NO_{3})(H_{2}O)	381.96	orthorhombic	Pbcn	a=16.151 b=11.854 c=6.795 Z=8	1300.9	3.900	colourless	
(TlNO_{3})[Cu(HSeO_{3})_{2}]		orthorhombic	Pnma	a=8.7788 b=13.668 c=7.2056				
Pb_{2}(SeO_{3})(NO_{3})_{2}		orthorhombic	Pmn2_{1}	a = 5.4669 b = 10.3277 c = 7.2610 Z = 4	409.96			
Pb_{2}(NO_{2})(NO_{3})(SeO_{3})		orthorhombic	Pmn2_{1}	a=5.529 b=10.357 c=6.811 Z=2				
PbCu_{3}(OH)(NO_{3})(SeO_{3})_{3}•0.5H_{2}O		triclinic	P1̅	a=7.761 b=9.478 c=9.514 α=66.94° β=69.83° γ=81.83° Z=2				
Pb_{2}Cu_{3}O_{2}(NO_{3})_{2}(SeO_{3})_{2}		orthorhombic	Cmc2_{1}	a=5.884 b=12.186 c=19.371 Z=4				
Pb(OF)Cu_{3}(SeO_{3})_{2}(NO_{3})	748.74		R3m	a=6.6973 c=18.5548 Z=3	720.75	5.175	dark brown	
PbCdF(SeO_{3})(NO_{3})		orthorhombic	Pca2_{1}	a=11.121 b=10.366 c=5.3950 Z=4	621.9	5.634	SHG 2.6×KDP band gap 4.42 eV	
Bi(SeO_{3})(NO_{3})		monoclinic	C2/c	a=15.352 b=4.9112 c=14.101 β=110.79°				
(Bi_{3}O_{2})(SeO_{3})_{2}(NO_{3})		monoclinic	P2_{1}/c	a=9.9403 b=9.6857 c=10.6864 β=93.115° Z=4				
((CH_{3})_{4}N)[UO_{2}(NO_{3})(SeO_{3})]		monoclinic	C2/m	a = 21.888 b = 6.9501 c = 8.349 β = 97.618° Z = 4	1259.0	2.813	yellow-green	
(H_{2}en)[(UO_{2})(SeO_{3})(HSeO_{3})](NO_{3})·0.5H_{2}O	1316.19	orthorhombic	Pbca	a = 13.170 b = 11.055 c = 18.009 Z = 4	2621.8	3.334		
