= Copper(II) selenite =

Names
- IUPAC name Copper(II) selenite
- Other names Copper selenite dihydrate

Identifiers
CAS Number	10214-40-1; 15168-20-4 (dihydrate)
3D model (JSmol)	Interactive image
ChemSpider	21241696 dihydrate
ECHA InfoCard	100.030.465
EC Number	233-526-6
PubChem CID	160923 anhydrous; 71317452 monohydrate; 24884280 dihydrate
UNII	G2Y4101Z3O; B084V60QBP (dihydrate)
CompTox Dashboard (EPA)	DTXSID20907163
- InChI: InChI=1S/Cu.H2O3Se/c;1-4(2)3/h;(H2,1,2,3)/q+2;/p-2 Key: JNRBLFVQPTZFAG-UHFFFAOYSA-L
- SMILES: [O-][Se](=O)[O-].[Cu+2]

Properties
Appearance	Blue
Solubility in water	Insoluble
Solubility	Slightly soluble in benzene and acids

Structure
Crystal structure	orthorhombic
Space group	Pcab (No. 61)
Lattice constant	a = 5.954 Å, b = 7.006 Å, c = 12.232 Å
Lattice volume (V)	510.2 Å^{3}
Formula units (Z)	8 units per cell

Hazards
- GHS labelling
Pictograms	(GHS06: Toxic) (GHS08: Health hazard) (GHS09: Environmental hazard)
Signal word	Danger
Hazard statements	H301, H331, H371, H410
Precautionary statements	P260, P264, P270, P271, P273, P301+P310, P304+P340, P311, P314, P321, P330, P391, P403+P233, P405, P501
- Except where otherwise noted, data are given for materials in their standard state (at 25 °C [77 °F], 100 kPa). Infobox references

Copper(II) selenite is an inorganic compound with the chemical formula CuSeO_{3}. It forms orthorhombic crystals. A blue dihydrate exists.

== Preparation ==
Copper(II) selenite can be prepared from copper(II) acetate and selenous acid.

== Uses ==
Copper(II) selenite can be used a catalyst for Kjeldahl digestion.

== Related compounds ==
A copper selenite chloride with the formula Cu_{5}(SeO_{3})_{4}Cl_{2} has been characterized by single-crystal X-ray diffraction.

== See also ==
- Selenite
- Selenous acid
