= Tellurite =

Ion

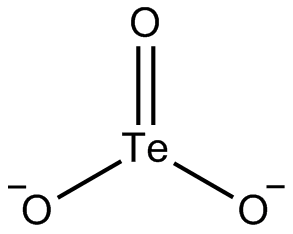
- Skeletal formula of tellurite

Names
- Systematic IUPAC name Tellurite (substitutive); Trioxidotellurate(2−) (additive)

Identifiers
CAS Number	15852-22-9
3D model (JSmol)	Interactive image
ChEBI	CHEBI:30477
ChemSpider	102958
Gmelin Reference	100741
PubChem CID	115037
- InChI: InChI=1S/H2O3Te/c1-4(2)3/h(H2,1,2,3)/p-2 Key: SITVSCPRJNYAGV-UHFFFAOYSA-L
- SMILES: [O-][Te+]([O-])[O-]

Properties
Chemical formula	TeO_{3}^{2−}
Molar mass	175.6 g mol^{−1}
Conjugate acid	Tellurous acid
- Except where otherwise noted, data are given for materials in their standard state (at 25 °C [77 °F], 100 kPa). Infobox references

Tellurite is a oxyanion of tellurium with the formula TeO_{3}^{2−}. It is the ion of tellurous acid, and is chemically related to tellurium dioxide (TeO_{2}, whose mineral appearance also bears the name tellurite. Tellurites are typically colorless or white salts, which in some ways are comparable to sulfite.

== Structure and reactions ==
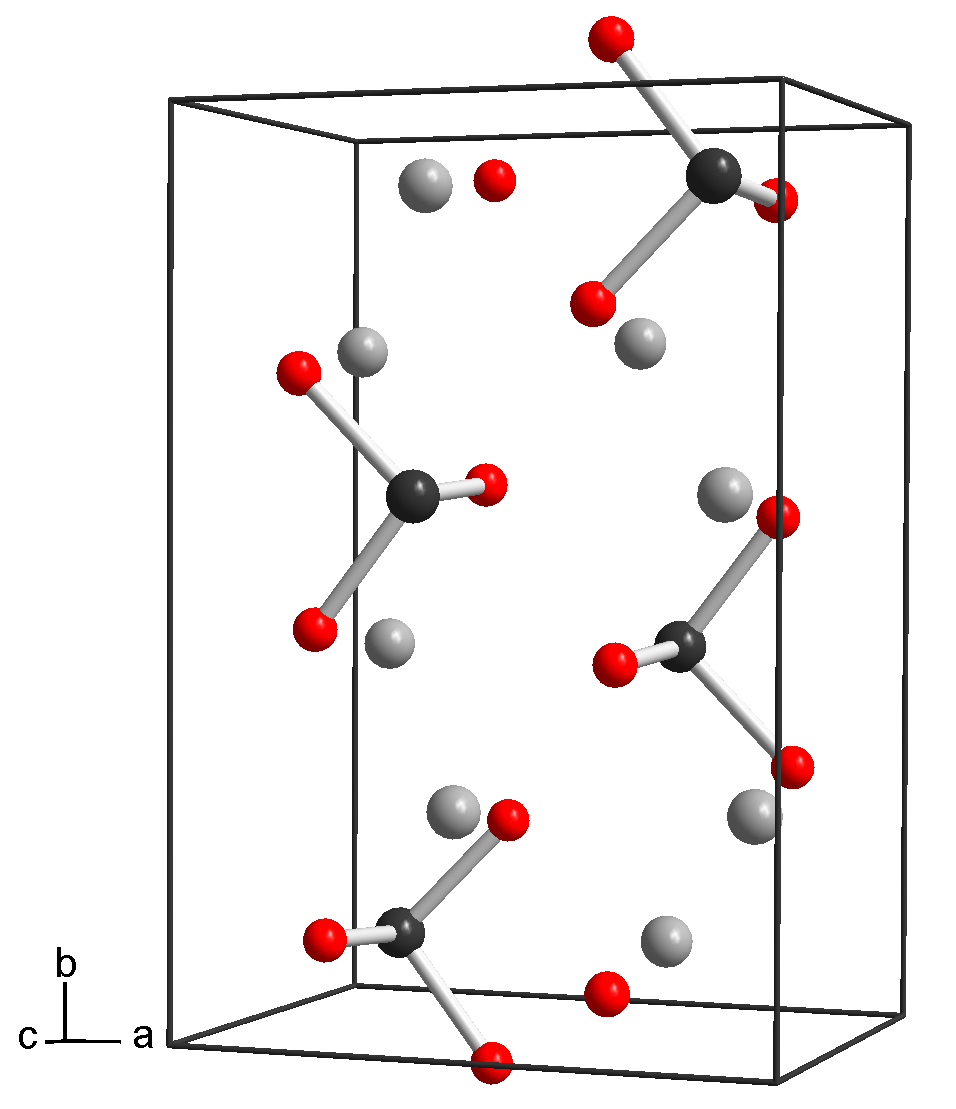
Crystal structure of sodium tellurite, highlighting the pyramidal structure of the anion.

Tellurite dianion is pyramidal, like selenite and sulfite. The anion has C_{3v} symmetry.

Tellurites can be reduced to elemental tellurium by electrolysis or a strong reducing agent. When fused with nitrate salts, tellurite salts oxidize to tellurates (TeO_{4}^{2−}).

Upon acidification of aqueous solutions of tellurite salts, solid hydrated tellurium dioxide (TeO_{2}) precipitates. This reaction allows the separation of tellurium from selenium since selenous acid remains soluble at low pH. The intermediate in the protonation occurs at oxygen to give [TeO_{2}(OH)]^{−}.

== Compounds ==
- Sodium tellurite
- Potassium tellurite (K_{2}TeO_{3}) is used together with agar as part of a selective medium for growth of some bacteria (Clauberg medium). Corynebacteria and some other species reduce TeO_{3}^{2−} to elemental Te, which stains the bacteria black.

== Biological activity ==
Tellurite (TeO₃²⁻) is a highly toxic oxyanion of tellurium with notable biological activity, particularly due to its toxic effects on various organisms, including bacteria, plants, and humans. The lack of mitochondrial proteins MRPL44, NAM9 (MNA6) and GEP3 (MTG3) in yeast is associated with resistance to tellurite.

== See also ==
- List of tellurites
