= Tellurous acid =

- Tellurous acid

Names
- IUPAC name Tellurous acid
- Other names Tellurium dioxide hydrate, tellurium(IV) oxide hydrate

Identifiers
CAS Number	10049-23-7
3D model (JSmol)	Interactive image
ChEBI	CHEBI:30465
ChemSpider	23310
ECHA InfoCard	100.030.145
PubChem CID	24936
UNII	IVA6SGP6QM
CompTox Dashboard (EPA)	DTXSID90143339
- InChI: InChI=1S/H2O3Te/c1-4(2)3/h(H2,1,2,3) Key: SITVSCPRJNYAGV-UHFFFAOYSA-N; InChI=1/H2O3Te/c1-4(2)3/h(H2,1,2,3) Key: SITVSCPRJNYAGV-UHFFFAOYAI
- SMILES: O[Te+]([O-])O

Properties
Chemical formula	H_{2}TeO_{3}
Molar mass	177.616 grams
Appearance	colorless crystals
Density	~ 3 g/cm^{3}
Boiling point	decomposes
Solubility in water	negligible
Acidity (pK_{a})	pK_{a1} = 2.48, pK_{a2} = 7.70
Conjugate base	Tellurite

Structure
Crystal structure	unknown
Molecular shape	pyramidal at Te

Related compounds
Other anions	Selenous acid Sulfurous acid
Other cations	Sodium tellurite
Related compounds	Telluric acid Selenic acid Sulfuric acid
- Except where otherwise noted, data are given for materials in their standard state (at 25 °C [77 °F], 100 kPa). verify (what is ?) Infobox references

Tellurous acid is an inorganic compound with the formula H_{2}TeO_{3}. It is the oxoacid of tellurium(IV). This compound is not well characterized. An alternative way of writing its formula is (HO)_{2}TeO. In principle, tellurous acid would form by treatment of tellurium dioxide with water, that is by hydrolysis. The related conjugate base is well known in the form of several salts such as potassium hydrogen tellurite, KHTeO_{3}.

== Properties ==
In contrast to the analogous compound selenous acid, tellurous acid is only metastable. Most tellurite salts contain the TeO_{3}^{2−} ion. Oxidation of its aqueous solution with hydrogen peroxide gives the tellurate ion. It is usually prepared as an aqueous solution where it acts as a weak acid.

H_{2}TeO_{3} + H_{2}O ⇌ H_{3}O^{+} + TeO_{3}^{−} K_{a1} = 2×10^{−3}
TeO_{3}^{−} + H_{2}O ⇌ H_{3}O^{+} + TeO_{3}^{2−} K_{a2} = 1×10^{−8}
