= Telluric acid =

Chemical compound (Te(OH)6)

- Skeletal formula of ortho-telluric acid

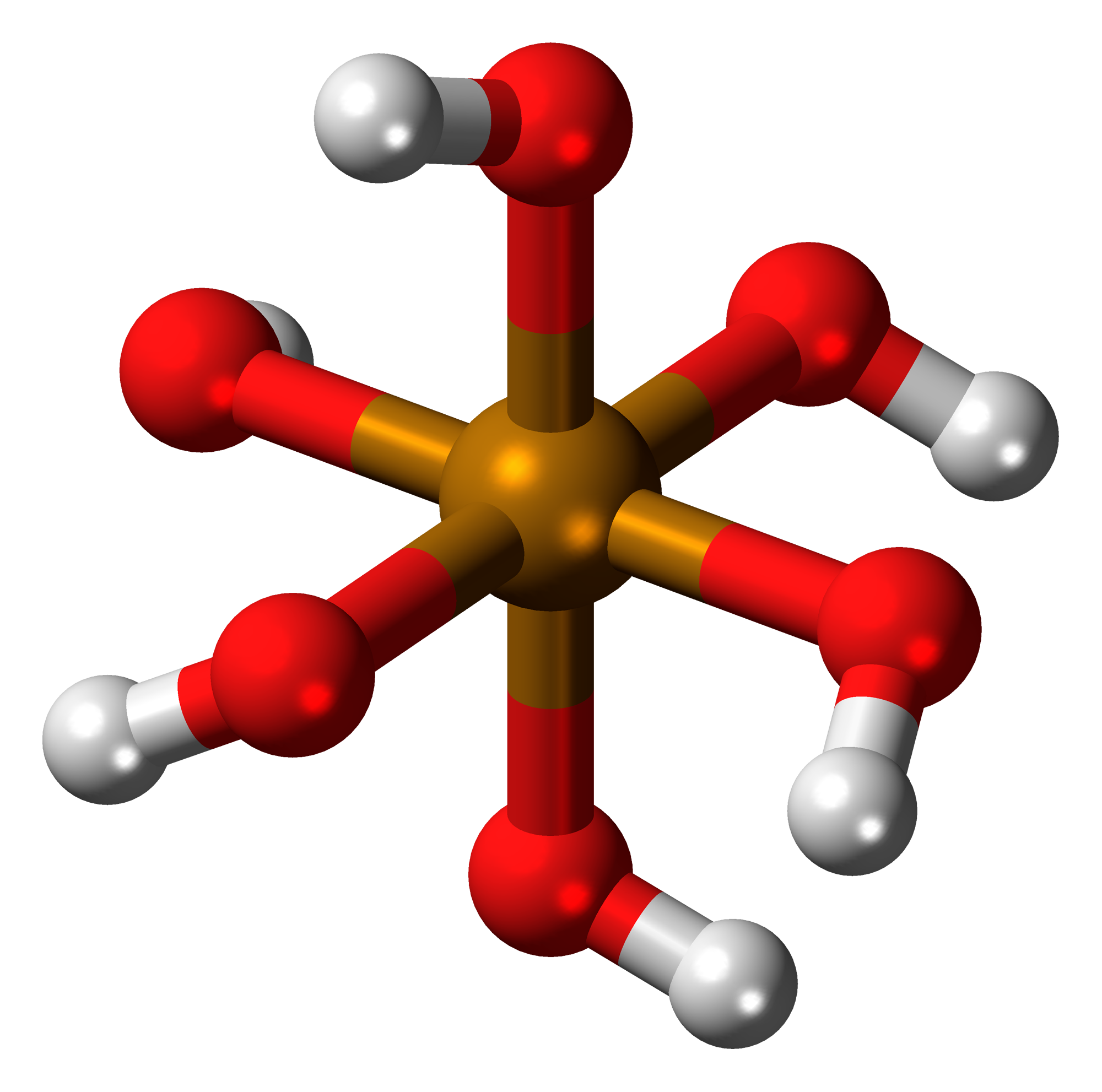
- Ball-and-stick model of ortho-telluric acid

Names
- IUPAC name Hexahydroxidotellurium
- Other names: Orthotelluric acid; Hexahydroxytellurium; Hexahydroxy-λ^{6}-tellane; Tellurium hexahydroxide; Tellurium(VI) hydroxide

Identifiers
CAS Number	7803-68-1
3D model (JSmol)	Interactive image
ChEBI	CHEBI:30463
ChemSpider	55517
ECHA InfoCard	100.029.334
PubChem CID	62686
UNII	WE1KZR49WU
CompTox Dashboard (EPA)	DTXSID5064887
- InChI: InChI=1S/H2O4Te/c1-5(2,3)4/h(H2,1,2,3,4) Key: XHGGEBRKUWZHEK-UHFFFAOYSA-N; InChI=1/H2O4Te/c1-5(2,3)4/h(H2,1,2,3,4) Key: XHGGEBRKUWZHEK-UHFFFAOYAT
- SMILES: O[Te](O)(O)(O)(O)O

Properties
Chemical formula	Te(OH)_{6}
Molar mass	229.64 g·mol^{−1}
Appearance	White monoclinic crystals
Density	3.07 g/cm^{3}
Melting point	136 °C (277 °F; 409 K)
Solubility in water	50.1 g/(100 ml) at 30 °C
Acidity (pK_{a})	7.5, 11, 14
Conjugate base	Tellurate

Structure
Molecular shape	octahedral
Dipole moment	0 D

Hazards
- Occupational safety and health (OHS/OSH)
Main hazards	corrosive

Related compounds
Other anions	Hydrotelluric acid Tellurous acid Hydrogen telluride
Related compounds	Teflic acid Sulfuric acid Selenic acid
- Except where otherwise noted, data are given for materials in their standard state (at 25 °C [77 °F], 100 kPa). verify (what is ?) Infobox references

Telluric acid, or more accurately orthotelluric acid, is a chemical compound with the formula Te(OH)_{6}, often written as H_{6}TeO_{6}. It is a white crystalline solid made up of octahedral Te(OH)_{6} molecules which persist in aqueous solution. In the solid state, there are two forms, rhombohedral and monoclinic, and both contain octahedral Te(OH)_{6} molecules, containing one hexavalent tellurium (Te) atom in the +6 oxidation state, attached to six hydroxyl (–OH) groups, thus, it can be called tellurium(VI) hydroxide. Telluric acid is a weak acid which is dibasic, forming tellurate salts with strong bases and hydrogen tellurate salts with weaker bases or upon hydrolysis of tellurates in water. It is used as tellurium-source in the synthesis of oxidation catalysts.

== Preparation ==
Telluric acid is formed by the oxidation of tellurium or tellurium dioxide with a powerful oxidising agent such as hydrogen peroxide, chromium trioxide or sodium peroxide.

TeO_{2} + H_{2}O_{2} + 2 H_{2}O → Te(OH)_{6}

Crystallization of telluric acid solutions below 10 °C gives telluric acid tetrahydrate Te(OH)_{6}·4H_{2}O. It is an oxidising agent, as shown by the electrode potential for the reaction below, although it is kinetically slow in its oxidations.

Te(OH)_{6} + 2 H^{+} + 2 e^{−} ⇌ TeO_{2} + 4 H_{2}O, E^{~~o~~} = +1.02 V

Chlorine, by comparison, is +1.36 V and selenous acid is +0.74 V in oxidizing conditions.

== Properties and reactions ==
The anhydrous acid is stable in air at 100 °C but above this it dehydrates to form polymetatelluric acid, a white hygroscopic powder (approximate composition (H_{2}TeO_{4})_{10}), and allotelluric acid, an acid syrup of unknown structure (approximate composition 3·H_{2}TeO_{4}·4H_{2}O).

Typical salts of the acid contains the anions [Te(O)(OH)_{5}]^{−} and [Te(O)_{2}(OH)_{4}]^{2−}. The presence of the tellurate ion TeO^{2−}_{4} has been confirmed in the solid state structure of Rb_{6}[TeO_{5}][TeO_{4}]. Strong heating at over 300 °C produces the α crystalline modification of tellurium trioxide, α-TeO_{3}. Reaction with diazomethane gives the hexamethyl ester, Te(OCH_{3})_{6}.

Telluric acid and its salts mostly contain hexacoordinate tellurium. This is true even for salts such as magnesium tellurate, MgTeO_{4}, which is isostructural with magnesium molybdate and contains TeO_{6} octahedra.

== Other forms of telluric acid ==
Metatelluric acid, H_{2}TeO_{4}, the tellurium analogue of sulfuric acid, H_{2}SO_{4}, is unknown. Allotelluric acid of approximate composition 3·H_{2}TeO_{4}·4H_{2}O, is not well characterised and may be a mixture of Te(OH)_{6} and (H_{2}TeO_{4})_{n}.

== Other tellurium acids ==
Tellurous acid H_{2}TeO_{3}, containing tellurium in its +4 oxidation state, is known but not well characterised. Hydrogen telluride is an unstable gas that forms hydrotelluric acid upon addition to water.
