= 2C-Se =

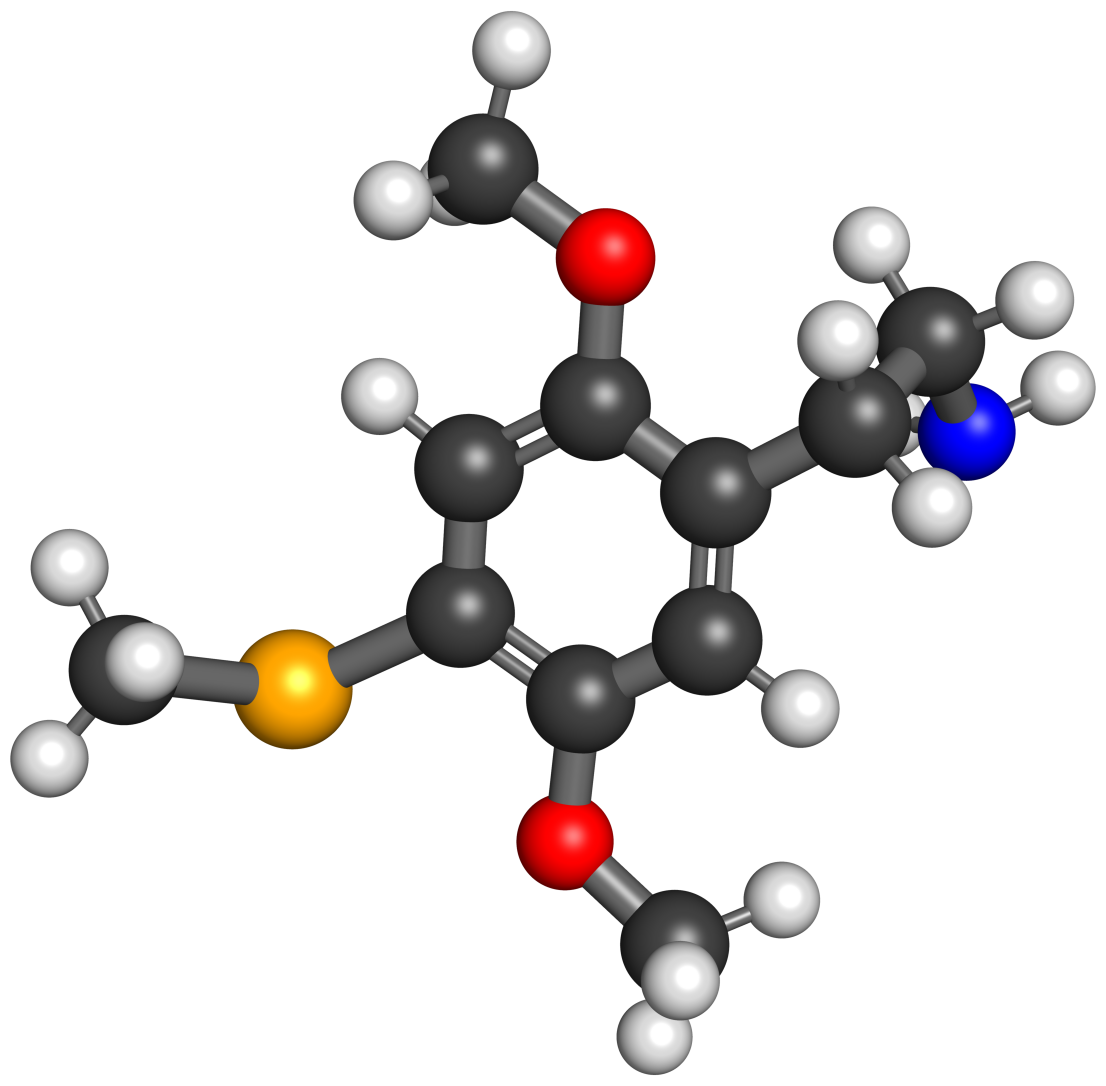

Clinical data
- Other names: 4-Methylseleno-2,5-dimethoxyphenethylamine;
- Routes of administration: Oral
- Drug class: Serotonergic psychedelic; Hallucinogen
- ATC code: None

Pharmacokinetic data
- Onset of action: 45 minutes
- Duration of action: 6–8 hours

Identifiers
- IUPAC name: 2-[2,5-dimethoxy-4-(methylselanyl)phenyl]ethan-1-amine
- CAS Number: 1189246-68-1
- PubChem CID: 44719515
- ChemSpider: 21106227
- UNII: 0KHR4CW43B
- CompTox Dashboard (EPA): DTXSID401242021

Chemical and physical data
- Formula: C_{11}H_{17}NO_{2}Se
- Molar mass: 274.233 g·mol^{−1}
- 3D model (JSmol): Interactive image
- Melting point: 240 to 241 °C (464 to 466 °F)
- SMILES: COC1=CC(=C(C=C1CCN)OC)[Se]C
- InChI: InChI=1S/C11H17NO2Se/c1-13-9-7-11(15-3)10(14-2)6-8(9)4-5-12/h6-7H,4-5,12H2,1-3H3; Key:CXQUHXATPUFGMC-UHFFFAOYSA-N

2C-Se, also known as 4-methylseleno-2,5-dimethoxyphenethylamine, is a psychedelic drug of the phenethylamine and 2C families.

It was originally named by Alexander Shulgin as described in his book PiHKAL (Phenethylamines I Have Known and Loved). Shulgin listed its dose as perhaps 100 mg orally and its duration as 6 to 8 hours. Its onset was 45 minutes, peak effects occurred after 1.5 hours, and doses of 50 to 70 mg orally produced threshold effects. Shulgin considered 2C-Se to be around three times the potency of mescaline, but was too concerned about toxicity to test it extensively, though he considered it noteworthy as the only psychedelic drug to contain a selenium atom.

The chemical synthesis of 2C-Se has been described.

2C-Se was first described in the literature by Shulgin in PiHKAL in 1991. It is a controlled substance in Canada under phenethylamine blanket-ban language.

== See also ==
- 2C (psychedelics)
- 2C-Se-TFM
- 2C-Te
