= Sodium selenite =

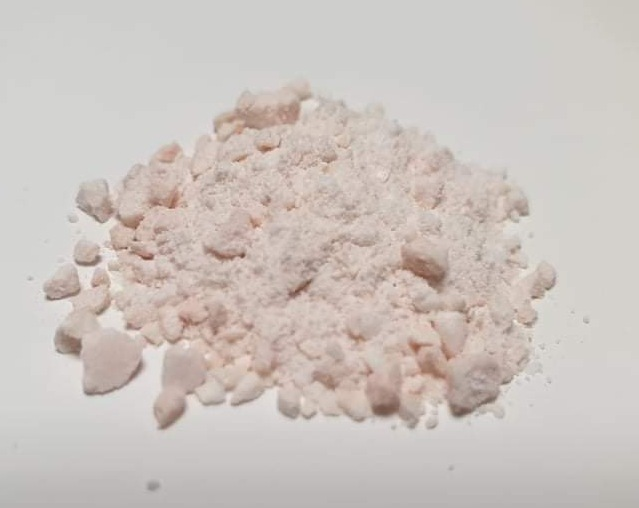

Identifiers
CAS Number	10102-18-8; 26970-82-1 (pentahydrate)
3D model (JSmol)	Interactive image
ChEBI	CHEBI:48843
ChEMBL	ChEMBL112302
ChemSpider	23308
ECHA InfoCard	100.030.230
EC Number	233-267-9
KEGG	D10530
PubChem CID	24934
RTECS number	VS7350000
UNII	HIW548RQ3W; 0WV4L961ZV (pentahydrate)
UN number	2630
CompTox Dashboard (EPA)	DTXSID0032077
- InChI: InChI=1S/2Na.H2O3Se/c;;1-4(2)3/h;;(H2,1,2,3)/q2*+1;/p-2 Key: BVTBRVFYZUCAKH-UHFFFAOYSA-L; InChI=1/2Na.H2O3Se/c;;1-4(2)3/h;;(H2,1,2,3)/q2*+1;/p-2 Key: BVTBRVFYZUCAKH-NUQVWONBAC
- SMILES: [Na+].[Na+].[O-][Se]([O-])=O

Properties
Chemical formula	Na_{2}O_{3}Se
Molar mass	172.948 g·mol^{−1}
Appearance	colourless solid
Density	3.1 g/cm^{3}
Melting point	350 °C (662 °F; 623 K) (decomposes over 300 °C (572 °F; 573 K))
Solubility in water	89.8 g/100mL (20 °C (68 °F; 293 K))
Vapor pressure	< 0.00133 hPa (1.93×10^{−5} psi) (20 °C (68 °F; 293 K))

Structure
Crystal structure	monoclinic (anhydrous); orthorhombic (pentahydrate)
Space group	Pbcm (pentahydrate)
Lattice constant	a = 6.5865 Å, b = 17.2263 Å, c = 14.7778 Å (pentahydrate)
Lattice volume (V)	1676.70 Å^{3} (pentahydrate)
Formula units (Z)	8 (pentahydrate)

Pharmacology
ATC code	A12CE02 (WHO) (Oral), B05XA20 (WHO) (Parenteral)

Hazards
- GHS labelling
Pictograms	(GHS06: Toxic) (GHS07: Exclamation mark) (GHS09: Environmental hazard)
Signal word	Danger
Hazard statements	H300+H330, H315, H317, H319, H411
Precautionary statements	P260, P264, P270, P271, P272, P273, P280, P284, P301+P310+P330, P302+P352, P304+P340+P310, P305+P351+P338, P333+P313, P337+P313, P362, P391, P403+P233, P405, P501
NFPA 704 (fire diamond)	4 0 0
Autoignition temperature	> 400 °C (752 °F; 673 K)
Threshold limit value (TLV)	0.2 mg/m^{3} (as selenium) (TWA)
- Lethal dose or concentration (LD, LC)
LD_{50} (median dose)	7 mg/kg (oral, rat)
LD_{Lo} (lowest published)	3.3 mg/kg (oral, sheep)
- NIOSH (US health exposure limits)
PEL (Permissible)	0.2 mg/m^{3} (TWA, as selenium)
REL (Recommended)	0.2 mg/m^{3} (TWA, as selenium)
IDLH (Immediate danger)	1 mg/m^{3}

Related compounds
Other anions	Sodium sulfite; Sodium selenate; Sodium selenide; Sodium biselenite
Other cations	Copper(II) selenite; Iron(III) selenite
- Except where otherwise noted, data are given for materials in their standard state (at 25 °C [77 °F], 100 kPa). verify (what is ?) Infobox references

Sodium selenite is the inorganic compound with the formula Na_{2}SeO_{3}. This salt is a colourless solid. The pink coloured pentahydrate Na_{2}SeO_{3}·5H_{2}O is the most common water-soluble selenium compound.

== Synthesis and fundamental reactions ==
Sodium selenite usually is prepared by the reaction of selenium dioxide with sodium hydroxide:

SeO_{2} + 2 NaOH → Na_{2}SeO_{3} + H_{2}O

The hydrate is stable in moist air, and converts to the anhydrous salt upon heating to 40 °C (104 °F) or storage in moist air.

According to X-ray crystallography, both anhydrous Na_{2}SeO_{3} and its pentahydrate feature pyramidal SeO^{2−}_{3}. The Se−O distances range from 1.67 to 1.72 Å. Oxidation of this anion gives sodium selenate, Na_{2}SeO_{4}.

== Applications ==
Together with the related barium and zinc selenites, sodium selenite is mainly used in the manufacture of colorless glass. The pink color imparted by these selenites cancels out the green color imparted by iron impurities.

Because selenium is an essential element, sodium selenite is an ingredient in dietary supplements such as multi-vitamin/mineral products, but supplements that provide only selenium use L-selenomethionine or a selenium-enriched yeast.

The US Food and Drug Administration approved a selenium supplement to animal diets; the most common form is sodium selenite for pet foods. According to one article:

"not much was known about which selenium compounds to approve for use in animal feeds when the decisions were made back in the 1970s .. At the time the regulatory action was taken, only the inorganic selenium salts (sodium selenite and sodium selenate) were available at a cost permitting their use in animal feed."

Sodium selenite has been proposed as an effective suicide agent.

== Safety ==
Selenium is toxic in high concentrations. As sodium selenite, the chronic toxic dose for human beings was described as about 2.4 to 3 mg of selenium per day. In 2000, the US Institute of Medicine set the adult Tolerable upper intake levels (UL) for selenium from all sources - food, drinking water and dietary supplements - at 400 μg/d. The European Food Safety Authority reviewed the same safety question and set its UL at 300 μg/d.

== See also ==
- Selenite (ion)
- Selenous acid
