= 2C-Se-TFM =

Identifiers
- IUPAC name: 4-trifluoromethylselanyl-2,5-dimethoxyphenethylamine
- CAS Number: 3036048-44-6
- PubChem CID: 171534638

Chemical and physical data
- Formula: C_{11}H_{14}F_{3}NO_{2}Se
- Molar mass: 328.204 g·mol^{−1}
- 3D model (JSmol): Interactive image
- SMILES: NCCc1cc(OC)c(cc1OC)[Se]C(F)(F)F
- InChI: InChI=1S/C11H14F3NO2Se/c1-16-8-6-10(18-11(12,13)14)9(17-2)5-7(8)3-4-15/h5-6H,3-4,15H2,1-2H3; Key:ODGBUUUVMLDZBP-UHFFFAOYSA-N

2C-Se-TFM is a designer drug from the substituted phenethylamine family, which produces psychedelic-like effects in animals such as a head twitch response. It was first synthesised by Josh Hartsel and colleagues in 2024. It has a binding affinity (K_{i}) of 3.2 nM at the serotonin receptor 5-HT_{2A} and an EC_{50} of 3.6 nM, acting as a full agonist. Aside from 2C-Se, it is the only psychedelic drug containing a selenium atom, as while other related analogues such as the ethyl compound 2C-Se-2 and the propyl derivative 2C-Se-7 have been proposed as theoretical compounds, neither is known to have been synthesised. It is a controlled substance in Canada under phenethylamine blanket-ban language.

== See also ==
- 2C (psychedelics)
- 2C-TFE
- 2C-T-4
- 2C-T-21
- 2C-T-TFM
- 2C-Te
