= Teflic acid =

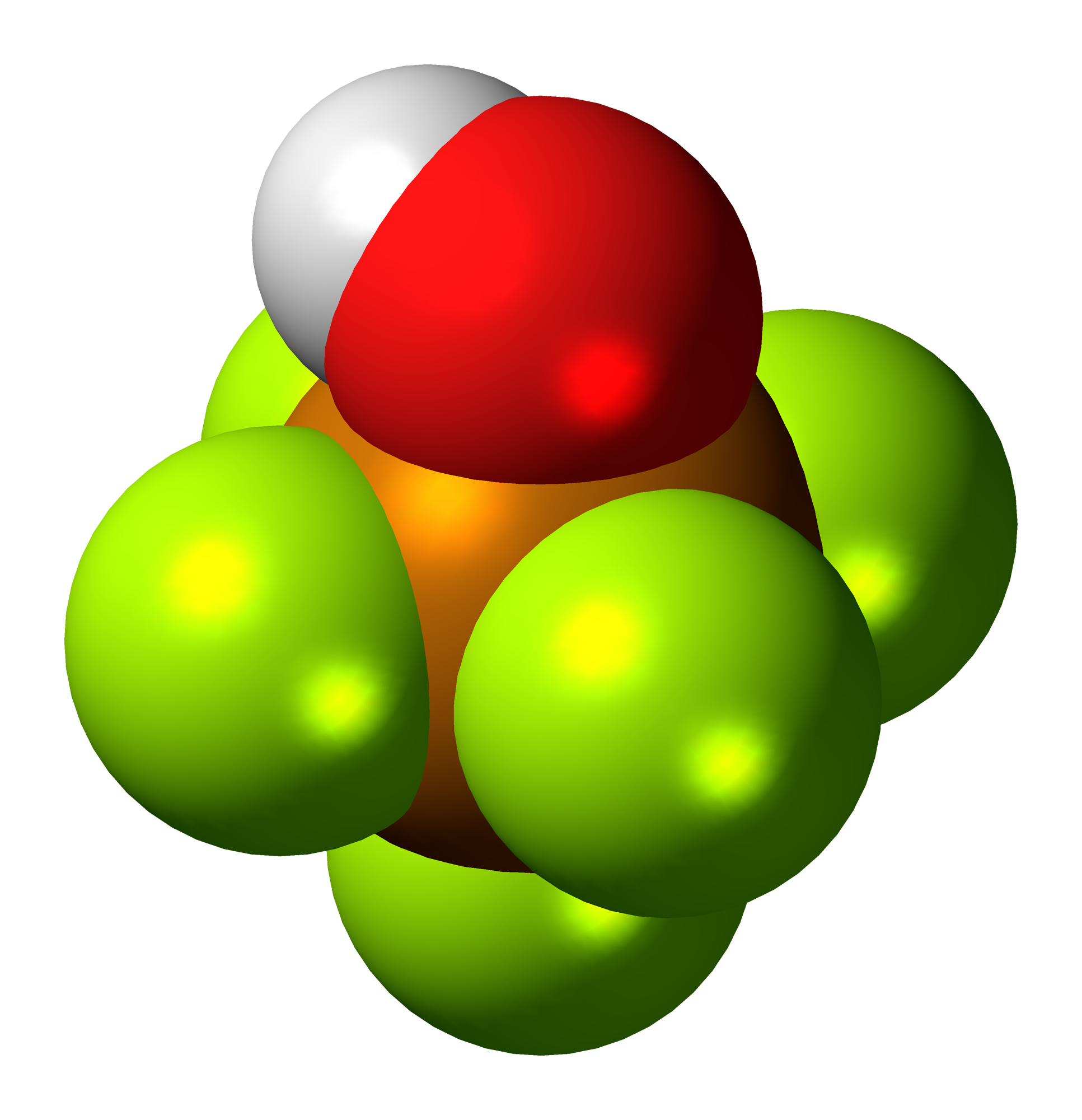
Space-filling model

Names
- IUPAC name Pentafluoroorthotelluric acid
- Other names Teflic acid

Identifiers
CAS Number	57458-27-2
3D model (JSmol)	Interactive image
ChemSpider	10331773
ECHA InfoCard	100.161.534
PubChem CID	15243876
CompTox Dashboard (EPA)	DTXSID60570416
- InChI: InChI=1S/F5HOTe/c1-7(2,3,4,5)6/h6H Key: OAOSLENTGBMCNC-UHFFFAOYSA-N; InChI=1/F5HOTe/c1-7(2,3,4,5)6/h6H Key: OAOSLENTGBMCNC-UHFFFAOYAO
- SMILES: F[Te](F)(F)(F)(F)O

Properties
Chemical formula	HOTeF_{5}
Molar mass	239.60 g·mol^{−1}
Appearance	colorless solid
Melting point	39.1 °C (102.4 °F; 312.2 K)
Boiling point	59.7 °C (139.5 °F; 332.8 K)
Acidity (pK_{a})	8.8 (in Ac_{2}O)

Hazards
- Occupational safety and health (OHS/OSH)
Main hazards	corrosive, toxic
- GHS labelling
Pictograms	(GHS05: Corrosive)
Signal word	Danger
Hazard statements	H314
Precautionary statements	P260, P264, P280, P301+P330+P331, P303+P361+P353, P304+P340, P305+P351+P338, P310, P321, P363, P405, P501
- Except where otherwise noted, data are given for materials in their standard state (at 25 °C [77 °F], 100 kPa). verify (what is ?) Infobox references

Teflic acid is a chemical compound with the formula HOTeF_{5}. This strong acid is related to orthotelluric acid, Te(OH)_{6}. Teflic acid has a slightly distorted octahedral molecular geometry.

== Preparation ==
Teflic acid was accidentally discovered by Engelbrecht and Sladky. Their synthesis did not yield the anticipated telluryl fluoride TeO_{2}F_{2}, but a mixture of volatile telluric compounds, containing HOTeF_{5}:

BaTeO_{4} + 10 FSO_{2}OH → HOTeF_{5} (25%)

Teflic acid can also be prepared from fluorosulfonic acid and barium tellurate:

5 FSO_{2}OH + Ba^{2+}[TeO_{2}(OH)_{4}]^{2−} → HOTeF_{5} + 4 H_{2}SO_{4} + BaSO_{4}

It is also the first hydrolysis product of tellurium hexafluoride:

TeF_{6} + H_{2}O → HOTeF_{5} + HF

A more recent synthetic route uses elemental tellurium as the starting material. In the first step, tellurium reacts with chlorine, potassium fluoride and water to give potassium pentafluoroorthotellurate (KOTeF_{5}):

$$\ce{Te + 3Cl2 + 9KF + H2O -> KOTeF5 + 2KHF2 + 6KCl}$$

Trichloroisocyanuric acid (TCICA) can be used as the oxidant in place of elemental chlorine. In the second step, the salt is protonated with sulfuric acid to yield teflic acid:

$$\ce{KOTeF5 + H2SO4 -> HOTeF5 + KHSO4}$$

== Teflates ==
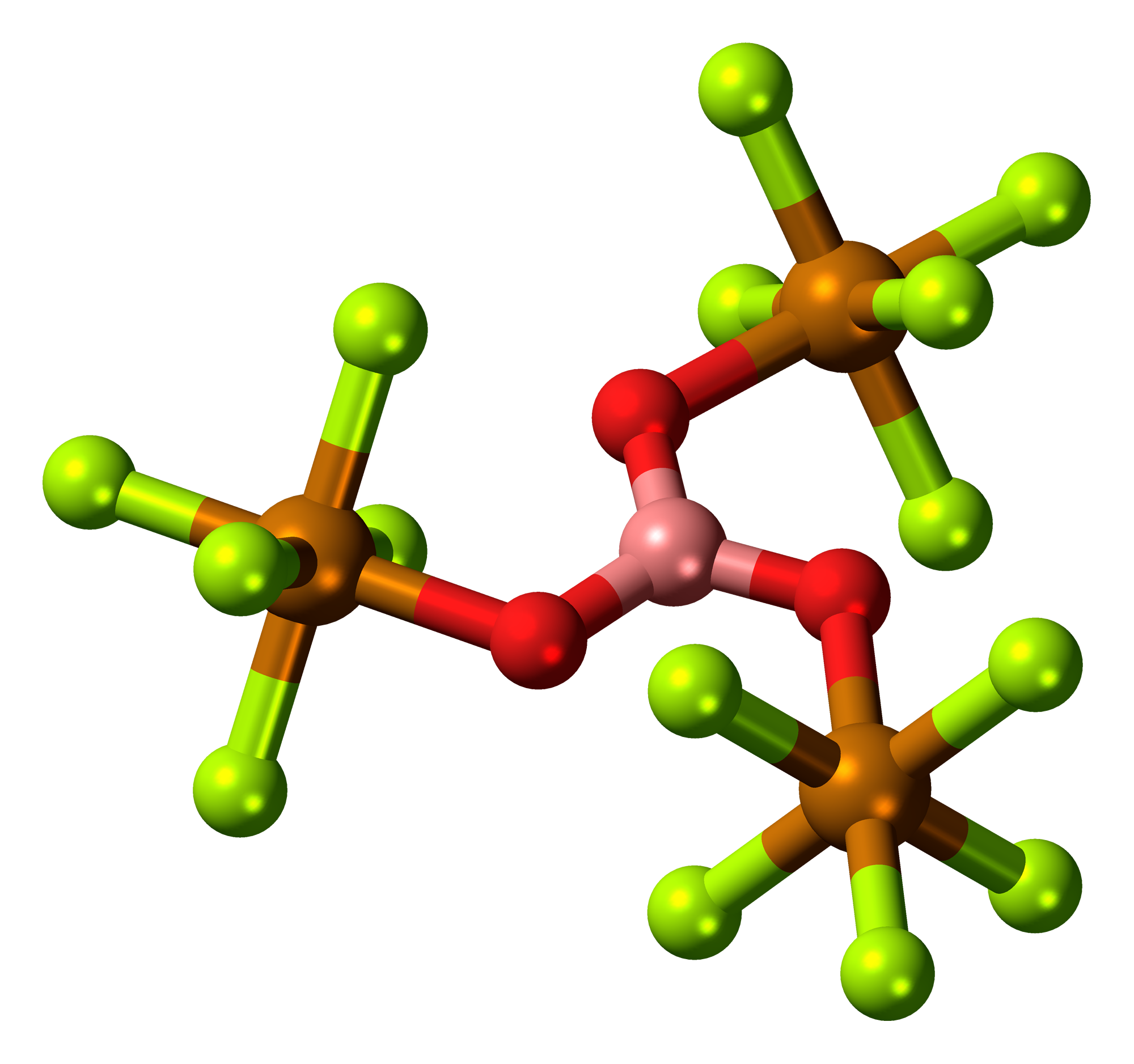
Boron teflate

The conjugate base of teflic acid is called the teflate anion, F_{5}TeO^{−} (not to be confused with triflate). Many teflates are known, one example being B(OTeF_{5})_{3}, that can be pyrolysed to give acid anhydride O(TeF_{5})_{2}.

2 B(OTeF_{5})_{3} → 2 B(OTeF_{5})_{2}F + O(TeF_{5})_{2}

The teflate anion is known to resist oxidation. This property has allowed the preparation several highly unusual species such as the hexateflates M(OTeF_{5})^{−}_{6} (in which M = As, Sb, Bi). Xenon forms the cation Xe(OTeF_{5})^{+}.
