= Selenium dioxide =

- Selenium dioxide

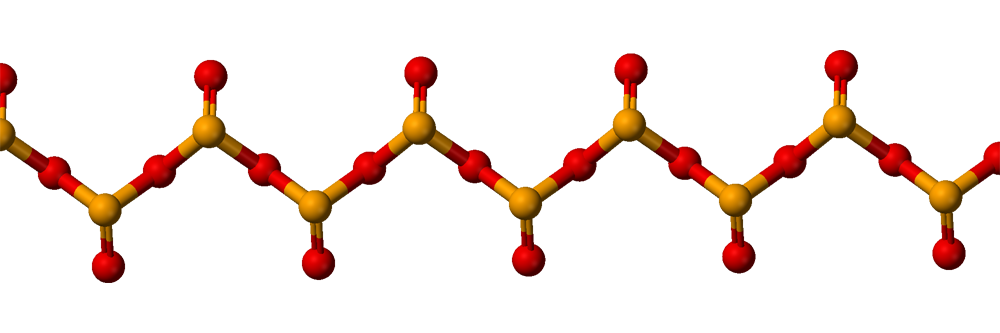
- Ball-and-stick model of a chain in crystalline selenium dioxide

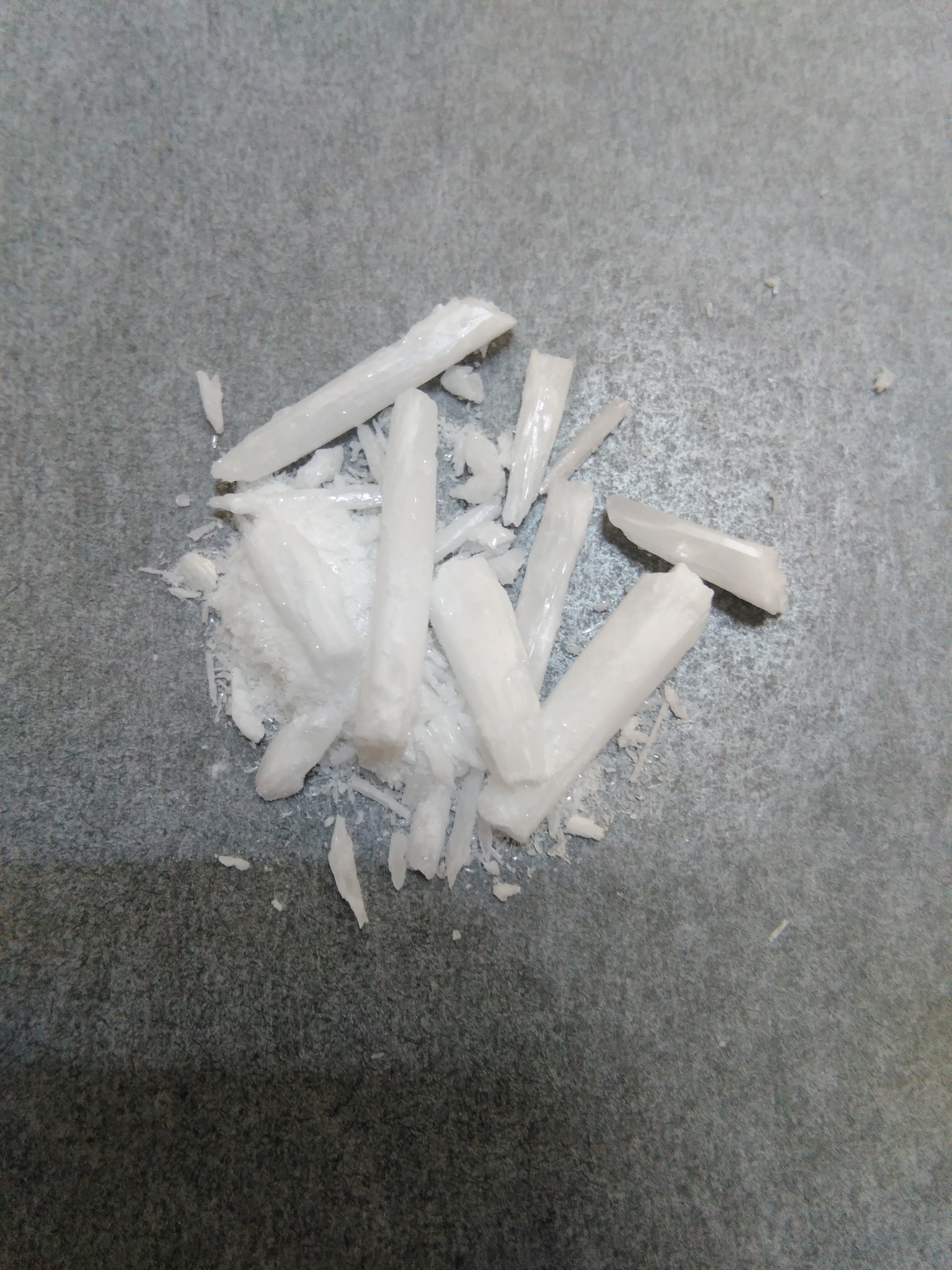
- Crystals of selenium dioxide

Names
- Other names Selenium(IV) oxide Selenous anhydride

Identifiers
CAS Number	7446-08-4
3D model (JSmol)	monomer: Interactive image; polymer: Interactive image
ChEMBL	ChEMBL3183452
ChemSpider	22440
ECHA InfoCard	100.028.358
EC Number	231-194-7
PubChem CID	24007
RTECS number	VS8575000
UNII	9N3UK29E57
UN number	3283
CompTox Dashboard (EPA)	DTXSID4021264
- InChI: InChI=1S/O2Se/c1-3-2 Key: JPJALAQPGMAKDF-UHFFFAOYSA-N; InChI=1/O2Se/c1-3-2 Key: JPJALAQPGMAKDF-UHFFFAOYAQ
- SMILES: monomer: O=[Se]=O; polymer: O[Se](=O)O[Se](=O)O[Se](=O)O[Se](=O)O[Se](=O)O[Se](=O)O[Se](=O)O[Se](=O)O[Se](=O)O[Se](=O)O[Se](=O)O[Se](=O)O[Se](=O)O[Se](=O)O[Se](=O)O

Properties
Chemical formula	SeO_{2}
Molar mass	110.969 g·mol^{−1}
Appearance	White tetragonal needles or powder
Odor	rotten horseradish
Density	3.95 g/cm^{3}, solid
Melting point	360 °C (680 °F; 633 K) (sealed tube)
Boiling point	315 °C (599 °F; 588 K) (sublimation point)
Solubility in water	263.4 g/100mL (22 °C (72 °F; 295 K), forms selenous acid)
Solubility in ethanol	soluble
Solubility in acetone	slightly soluble
Solubility in methanol	soluble
Vapor pressure	1 Pa (124.5 °C (256.1 °F; 397.6 K)); 1 kPa (228 °C (442 °F; 501 K)); 100 kPa (315 °C (599 °F; 588 K))
Band gap	3.29 eV
Magnetic susceptibility (χ)	−27.2×10^{−6} cm^{3}/mol
Dipole moment	2.62±0.05 D

Structure
Crystal structure	Tetragonal
Space group	P4_{2}/mbc
Point group	4/mmm
Lattice constant	a = 8.37 Å, b = 8.37 Å, c = 5.08 Å α = 90°, β = 90°, γ = 90°
Lattice volume (V)	356.23 Å^{3}
Formula units (Z)	8

Thermochemistry
Std enthalpy of formation (Δ_{f}H^{⦵}_{298})	−225.4 kJ/mol
Enthalpy of fusion (Δ_{f}H^{⦵}_{fus})	17.6 kJ/mol

Hazards
- Occupational safety and health (OHS/OSH)
Main hazards	Toxic by ingestion and inhalation
- GHS labelling
Pictograms	(GHS06: Toxic) (GHS08: Health hazard) (GHS09: Environmental hazard)
Signal word	Danger
Hazard statements	H301+H331, H373, H410
Precautionary statements	P260, P264, P270, P271, P273, P301+P310+P330, P304+P340+P311, P314, P391, P403+P233, P405, P501
NFPA 704 (fire diamond)	4 0 1
Flash point	Non-flammable
Threshold limit value (TLV)	0.2 mg/m^{3} (TWA)
- Lethal dose or concentration (LD, LC)
LD_{50} (median dose)	48 mg/kg (oral, rat); 4 mg/kg (dermal, rabbit)
LC_{Lo} (lowest published)	5890 mg/m^{3} (rabbit, 20 min); 6590 mg/m^{3} (goat, 10 min); 6590 mg/m^{3} (sheep, 10 min)
- NIOSH (US health exposure limits): (Note: PEL, REL, and IDLH values are based on sodium selenide, which is an order of magnitude more toxic than other selenium compounds.)
PEL (Permissible)	0.2 mg/m^{3}
REL (Recommended)	0.2 mg/m^{3}
IDLH (Immediate danger)	1 mg/m^{3} (as Se)

Related compounds
Other cations	Ozone; Sulfur dioxide; Tellurium dioxide
Related selenium oxides	Selenium trioxide
Related compounds	Selenous acid; Selenium disulfide
- Except where otherwise noted, data are given for materials in their standard state (at 25 °C [77 °F], 100 kPa). verify (what is ?) Infobox references

Selenium dioxide is the chemical compound with the formula SeO_{2}. This colorless solid is one of the most frequently encountered compounds of selenium. It is used in making specialized glasses as well as a reagent in organic chemistry.

== Properties ==
Solid SeO_{2} is a one-dimensional polymer, the chain consisting of alternating selenium and oxygen atoms. Each Se atom is pyramidal and bears a terminal oxide group. The bridging Se−O bond lengths are 1.79 Å and the terminal Se−O distance is 1.62 Å. The relative stereochemistry at Se alternates along the polymer chain (syndiotactic).

In the gas phase selenium dioxide is present as dimers and other oligomeric species, at higher temperatures it is monomeric. The monomeric form adopts a bent structure very similar to that of sulfur dioxide with a bond length of 1.61 Å. The dimeric form has been isolated in a low temperature argon matrix and vibrational spectra indicate that it has a centrosymmetric chair form. Dissolution of SeO_{2} in selenium oxydichloride give the trimer [Se(O)O]_{3}.

The solid sublimes readily. At very low concentrations the vapour has a revolting odour, resembling decayed horseradishes. At higher concentrations the vapour has an odour resembling horseradish sauce and can burn the nose and throat on inhalation. Whereas SO_{2} tends to be molecular and SeO_{2} is a one-dimensional chain, TeO_{2} is a cross-linked polymer.

SeO_{2} is considered an acidic oxide: it dissolves in water to form selenous acid. Often the terms selenous acid and selenium dioxide are used interchangeably. It reacts with base to form selenite salts containing the SeO^{2−}_{3} anion. For example, reaction with sodium hydroxide produces sodium selenite:

SeO_{2} + 2 NaOH → Na_{2}SeO_{3} + H_{2}O

== Preparation ==
Selenium dioxide is prepared by oxidation of selenium by burning in air or by reaction with nitric acid or hydrogen peroxide, but perhaps the most convenient preparation is by the dehydration of selenous acid:

2 H_{2}O_{2} + Se → SeO_{2} + 2 H_{2}O
3 Se + 4 HNO_{3} + H_{2}O → 3 H_{2}SeO_{3} + 4 NO
H_{2}SeO_{3} ⇌ SeO_{2} + H_{2}O

== Occurrence ==
The natural form of selenium dioxide, downeyite, is a very rare mineral. It is only found at a small number of coal-seam fires, where it forms around vents created from escaping gasses.

== Uses ==
=== Organic synthesis ===
SeO_{2} is an important reagent in organic synthesis. Oxidation of paraldehyde (acetaldehyde trimer) with SeO_{2} gives glyoxal and the oxidation of cyclohexanone gives 1,2-cyclohexanedione. The selenium starting material is reduced to selenium, and precipitates as a red amorphous solid which can easily be filtered off. This type of reaction is called a Riley oxidation. It is also renowned as a reagent for allylic oxidation, a reaction that entails the following conversion:

Allylic oxidation

This can be described more generally as:

R_{2}C=CR′−CHR″_{2} + [O] → R_{2}C=CR′−C(OH)R″_{2}

where R, R', R" may be alkyl or aryl substituents.

Selenium dioxide can also be used to synthesize 1,2,3-selenadiazoles from acylated hydrazone derivatives.

=== As a colorant ===
Selenium dioxide imparts a red colour to glass. It is used in small quantities to counteract the colour due to iron impurities and so to create (apparently) colourless glass. In larger quantities, it gives a deep ruby red colour.

Selenium dioxide is the active ingredient in some cold-bluing solutions.

It was also used as a toner in photographic developing.

=== Safety ===
Selenium is an essential element, but ingestion of more than 5 mg/d leads to nonspecific symptoms.
