= Tellurate =

Compound containing an oxyanion of tellurium

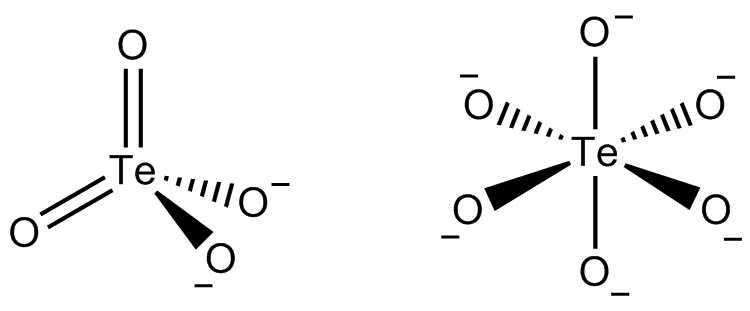
The structure of metatellurate and orthotellurate

In chemistry, tellurate is a compound containing an oxyanion of tellurium where tellurium has an oxidation number of +6. In the naming of inorganic compounds it is a suffix that indicates a polyatomic anion with a central tellurium atom.

== Tellurium oxyanions ==
Historically the name tellurate was only applied to oxyanions of tellurium with oxidation number +6, formally derived from telluric acid Te(OH)_{6}, and the name tellurite referred to oxyanions of tellurium with oxidation number +4, formally derived from tellurous acid (HO)_{2}TeO and these names are in common use. However tellurate and tellurite are often referred to as tellurate(VI) and tellurate(IV) respectively in line with IUPAC renaming recommendations. The metatellurate ion is TeO^{2−}_{4} and the orthotellurate ion is TeO^{6−}_{6}. Other oxyanions include pentaoxotellurate, TeO^{4−}_{5}, ditellurate, Te_{2}O^{8−}_{10} and polymeric anions with 6-coordinate tellurium such as (TeO^{4−}_{5})_{n}.

=== Metatellurates ===
The metatellurate ion TeO^{2−}_{4} is analogous to the sulfate ion, SO^{2−}_{4} and the selenate ion, SeO^{2−}_{4}. Whereas many sulfates and selenates form isomorphous salts the tetrahedral metatellurate ion is only found in a few compounds such as the tetraethylammonium salt (NEt_{4})_{2}TeO_{4}. Many compounds with a stoichiometry that suggests the presence of a metatellurate ion actually contain polymeric anions containing 6-coordinate tellurium(VI), for example sodium tellurate, Na_{2}TeO_{4} which contains octahedral tellurium centers sharing edges.

TeO^{2−}_{4} → TeO^{2−}_{3} + 1/2 O_{2} (E^{0} = −1.042 V)

The E^{0} or standard reduction potential value is significant as it gives an indication of the strength of the tellurate ion as an oxidizing agent.

=== Orthotellurates ===
Compounds containing the octahedral TeO^{6−}_{6} anion are known, these include Ag_{6}TeO_{6}, Na_{6}TeO_{6} and Hg_{3}TeO_{6}. There are also hydroxyoxotellurates, containing protonated TeO^{6−}_{6}, such as (NH_{4})_{2}TeO_{2}(OH)_{4} (sometimes written as NH_{4}TeO_{4}·2H_{2}O) which contains the octahedral TeO_{2}(OH)^{2−}_{4} ion.

=== TeO^{4−}_{5} ion ===
The compound Cs_{2}K_{2}TeO_{5} contains TeO^{4−}_{5} ions which are trigonal bipyramidal. The compound Rb_{6}Te_{2}O_{9} contains both TeO^{4−}_{5} and TeO^{2−}_{4} anions. Other compounds whose stoichiometry suggests the presence of TeO^{4−}_{5} may contain either the dimeric Te_{2}O^{8−}_{10} made up of two edge-sharing {TeO_{6}} as in Li_{4}TeO_{5} and Ag_{4}TeO_{5} or corner-sharing {TeO_{6}} octahedra as in Hg_{2}TeO_{5}.

=== Polymeric tellurate ions ===
The dimeric Te_{2}O^{8−}_{10} made up of two edge sharing {TeO_{6}} octahedra is found in the compound Li_{4}TeO_{5}. A similar hydroxy-oxy anion, Te_{2}O_{6}(OH)_{4} is found in sodium potassium ditellurate(VI) hexahydrate, Na_{0.5}K_{3.5}Te_{2}O_{6}(OH)_{4}·6H_{2}O which contains pairs of edge sharing octahedra. Polymeric chain anions consisting of corner-shared {TeO_{6}} octahedra (TeO_{5})^{4n−}_{n} are found, for example in Li_{4}TeO_{5}.

=== Aqueous chemistry ===
In aqueous solution tellurate ions are 6 coordinate. In neutral conditions the pentahydrogen orthotellurate ion, H_{5}TeO^{−}_{6}, is the most common; in basic conditions, the tetrahydrogen orthotellurate ion, H_{4}TeO^{2−}_{6}, and in acid conditions, orthotelluric acid, Te(OH)_{6} or H_{6}TeO_{6} is formed.

=== Structural comparisons with oxyanions of sulfur and selenium ===
Sulfur(VI) oxyanions have a coordination number of 4 and in addition to the tetrahedral sulfate ion, SO^{2−}_{4}, the pyrosulfate, S_{2}O^{2−}_{7}, trisulfate, S_{3}O^{2−}_{10} and pentasulfate S_{5}O^{2−}_{16} ions all contain 4-coordinate sulfur and are built from corner-shared {SO_{4}} tetrahedra. Selenate compounds include many examples of four coordinate selenium, principally the tetrahedral SeO^{2−}_{4} ion and the pyroselenate ion, Se_{2}O^{2−}_{7} which has a similar structure to the pyrosulfate ion. Unlike sulfur there are examples of a 5-coordinate selenium oxyanion, SeO^{4−}_{5} and one example of SeO^{6−}_{6}.

== NMR spectroscopy ==
Tellurium has two NMR active nuclei, ^{123}Te and ^{125}Te. ^{123}Te has an abundance of 0.9% and a nuclear spin (I) of 1/2. ^{125}Te has an abundance of 7% and an equivalent nuclear spin. ^{125}Te is more commonly performed because it has a higher sensitivity. The metatellurate anion has a chemical shift around 610 ppm when analyzed using ^{125}Te NMR at 25 °C at a frequency of 94.735 MHz and referenced externally against aqueous 1.0 M telluric acid.

== The tellurate suffix in the naming of inorganic compounds ==
Following the IUPAC Red Book(2005) some examples are:

- metatellurate ion, or tetraoxotellurate(VI) TeO^{2−}_{4} is tetraoxidotellurate(2−)
- orthotellurate ion, or hexaoxotellurate(VI) TeO^{6−}_{6} is hexaoxidotellurate(6−)
- octafluorotellurate(VI) ion TeF^{2−}_{8} is octafluoridotellurate(2−).
