= Sodium tellurite =

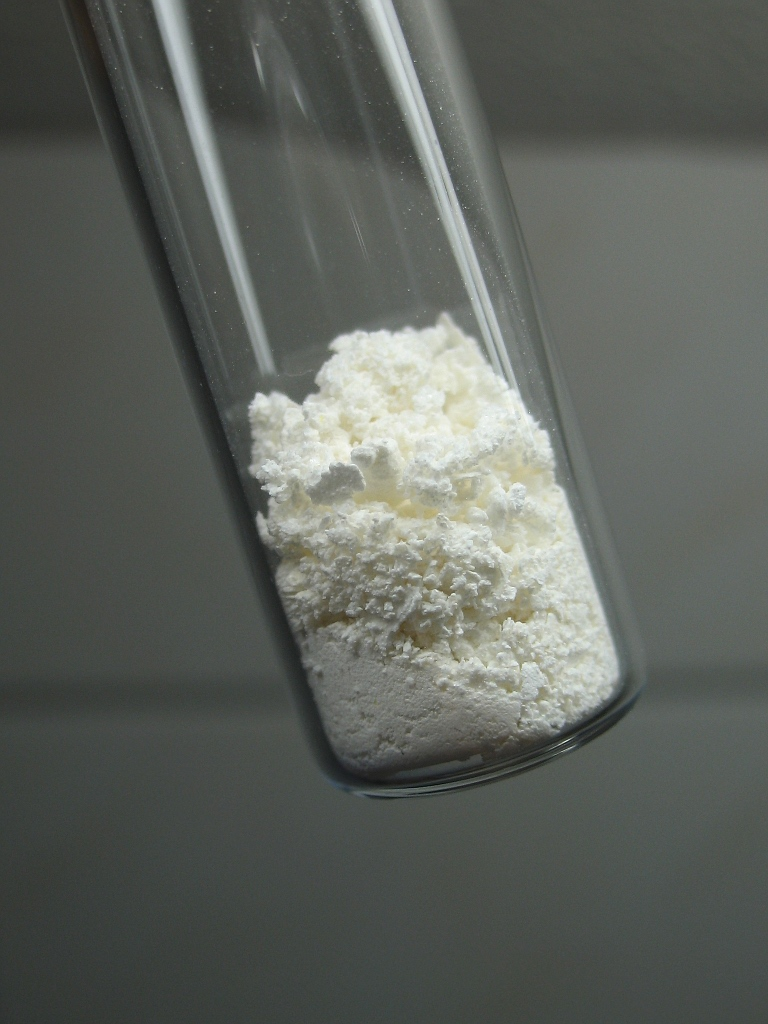

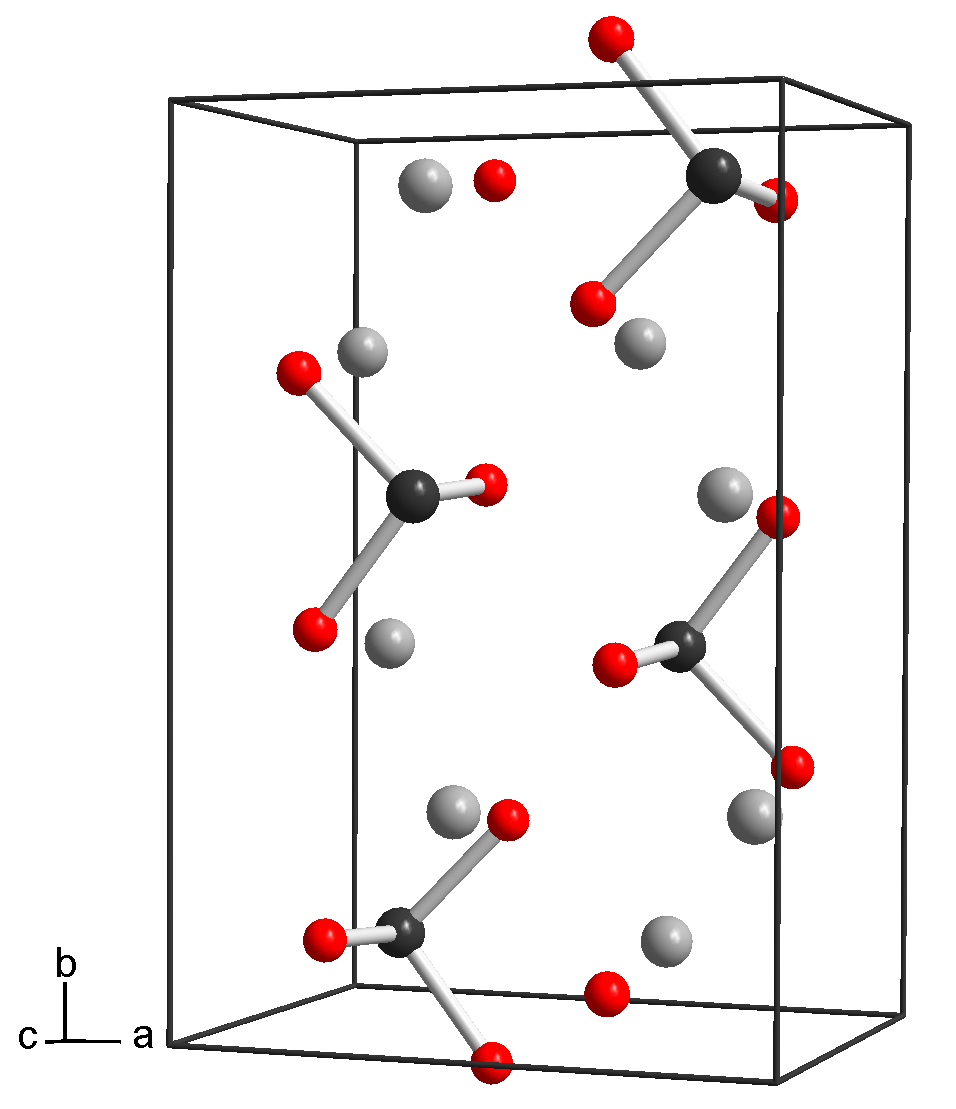

Names
- Other names Sodium Tellurite IV, Tellurous acid disodium salt

Identifiers
CAS Number	10102-20-2
3D model (JSmol)	Interactive image
ChemSpider	23309
ECHA InfoCard	100.030.231
EC Number	233-268-4
PubChem CID	24935
RTECS number	WY2450000
UNII	0BB57LA23Y
UN number	3288
CompTox Dashboard (EPA)	DTXSID2064943
- InChI: InChI=1S/2Na.H2O3Te/c;;1-4(2)3/h;;(H2,1,2,3)/q2*+1;/p-2 Key: VOADVZVYWFSHSM-UHFFFAOYSA-L; InChI=1/2Na.H2O3Te/c;;1-4(2)3/h;;(H2,1,2,3)/q2*+1;/p-2 Key: VOADVZVYWFSHSM-NUQVWONBAS
- SMILES: [Na+].[Na+].[O-][Te]([O-])=O

Properties
Chemical formula	Na_{2}TeO_{3}
Molar mass	221.57774 g/mol
Appearance	white crystals, powder
Density	6.245 g/cm^{3}
Melting point	710 °C (1,310 °F; 983 K)
Solubility in water	soluble greater than or equal to 100 mg/mL at 68°F

Structure
Crystal structure	rhombic

Hazards
- GHS labelling
Pictograms	(GHS06: Toxic)
Signal word	Danger
Hazard statements	H300, H301, H311, H330, H331
Precautionary statements	P260, P264, P270, P271, P280, P284, P301+P310, P302+P352, P304+P340, P310, P311, P312, P320, P321, P330, P361, P363, P403+P233, P405, P501
- Lethal dose or concentration (LD, LC)
LD_{50} (median dose)	83 mg/kg (rat, oral)
- Except where otherwise noted, data are given for materials in their standard state (at 25 °C [77 °F], 100 kPa). verify (what is ?) Infobox references

Sodium tellurite is an inorganic tellurium compound with formula Na_{2}TeO_{3}. It is a water-soluble white solid and a weak reducing agent. Sodium tellurite is an intermediate in the extraction of the element, tellurium; it is a product obtained from anode slimes and is a precursor to tellurium.

== Preparation ==
The main source of tellurium is from copper anode slimes, which contain precious metals as well as various tellurides. These slimes are roasted with sodium carbonate and oxygen to produce sodium tellurite.

Ag_{2}Te + Na_{2}CO_{3} + O_{2} → 2Ag + Na_{2}TeO_{3} + CO_{2} (400–500 °C)

This is a reaction with silver telluride. The telluride is oxidized to tellurite and the silver(I) is reduced to silver.

== Purification ==
The electrolysis of a tellurite solution yields purified tellurium.

Anode: 4 OH^{−} → 2 H_{2}O + O_{2} + 4e^{−}
Cathode: TeO^{2−}_{3} + 3 H_{2}O + 4e^{−} → Te + 6 OH^{−}

== Structure and properties ==
Tellurium has properties similar to sulfur and selenium. In the anhydrous form Na_{2}TeO_{3} the tellurium atoms are 6 coordinate, three Te-O at 1.87 Å and three at 2.9 Å, with distorted octahedra sharing edges. In the pentahydrate, Na_{2}TeO_{3}.5H_{2}O there are discrete tellurite anions, TeO_{3}^{2−} which are pyramidal. The Te-O distance is 1.85 - 1.86 Å and the O-Te-O angle is close to 99.5°. The tellurite anion is a weak base. Sodium tellurite would be similar to sodium selenite and sodium sulfite. Sodium tellurite is both a weak oxidizing agent and a weak reducing agent.

== Tellurite-related reactions ==
H_{2}TeO_{3} → H^{+} + HTeO_{3}^{−} pK 2.48

Telluric acid loses a proton at this pKa.

HTeO_{3}^{−} → H^{+} + TeO_{3}^{2−} pK 7.7

Hydrogen tellurite loses a proton at this pKa to become the tellurite ion. This would happen in the reaction of tellurous acid with sodium hydroxide to make sodium tellurite.

TeO_{2} + 2OH^{−} → TeO_{3}^{2−} + H_{2}O

This is the reaction of tellurium dioxide with a base to make a tellurite salt.

== Applications ==
Sodium tellurite improves the corrosion resistance of electroplated nickel layers. Solutions of sodium tellurite are used for black or blue-black coatings on iron, steel, aluminum, and copper. In microbiology, sodium tellurite can be added to the growth medium to isolate bacteria with an inherent physiological resistance to its toxicity.
