= Selenite (ion) =

Anion composed of selenium and oxygen

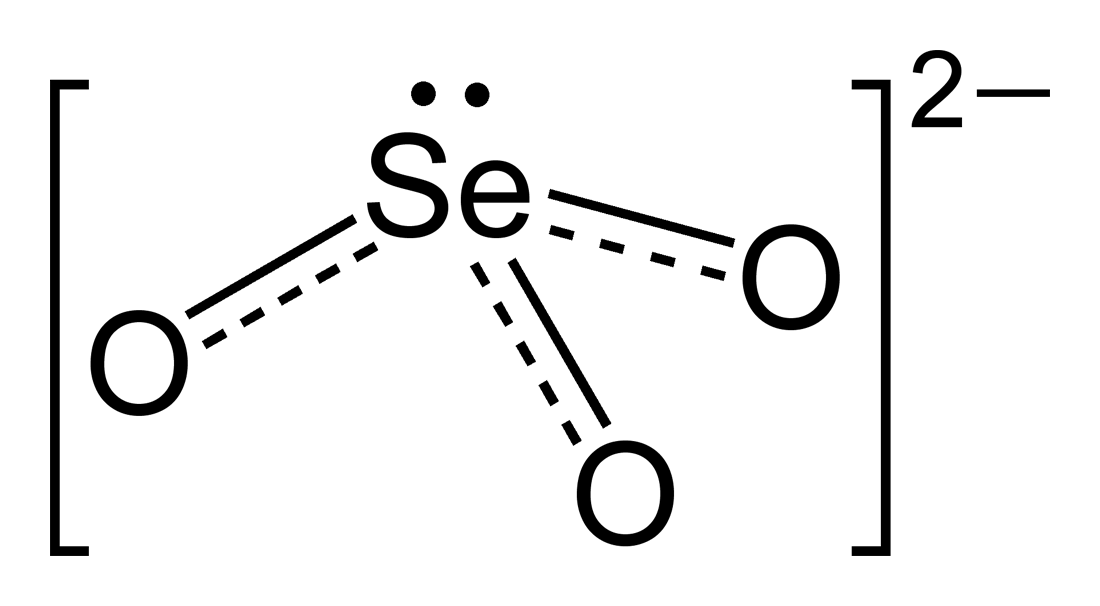
Structure of selenite

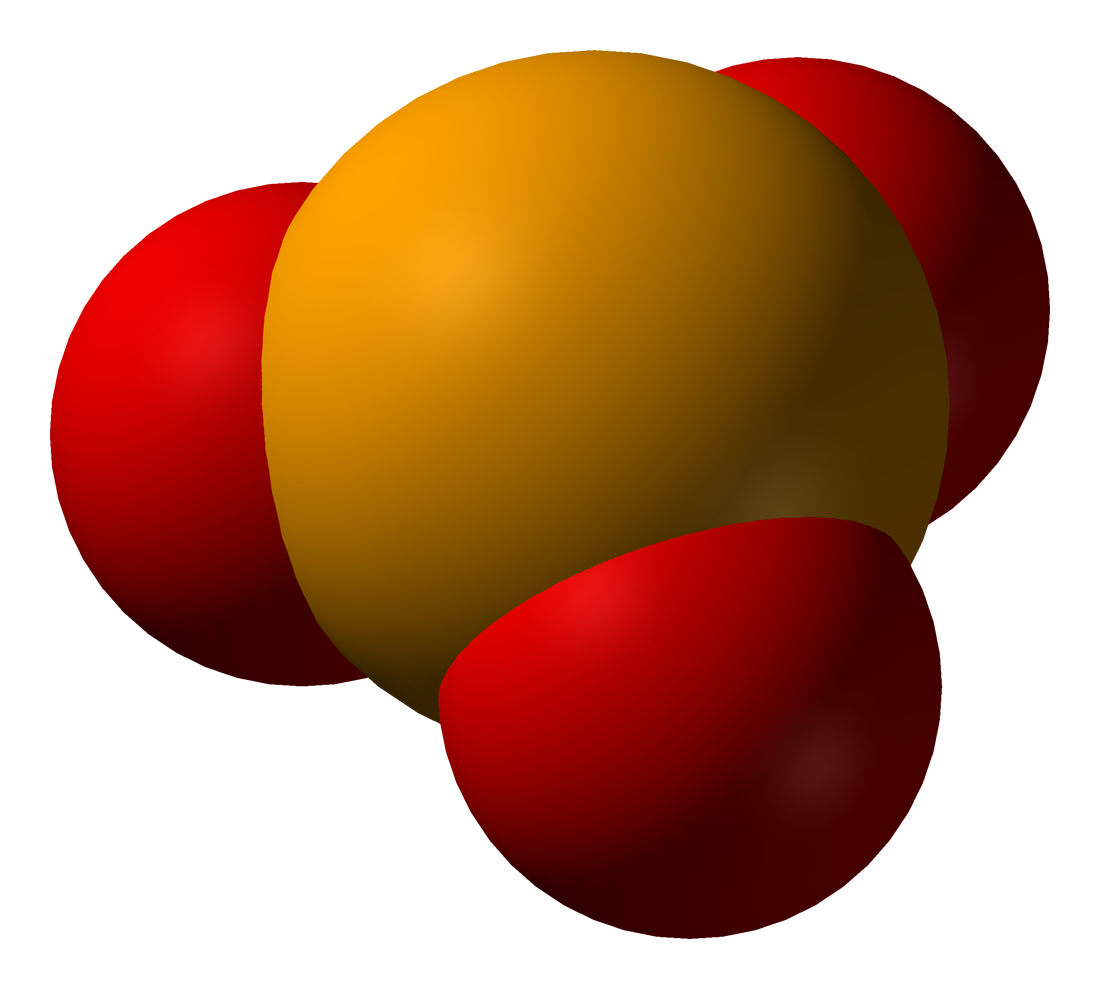
Space-filling model of selenite

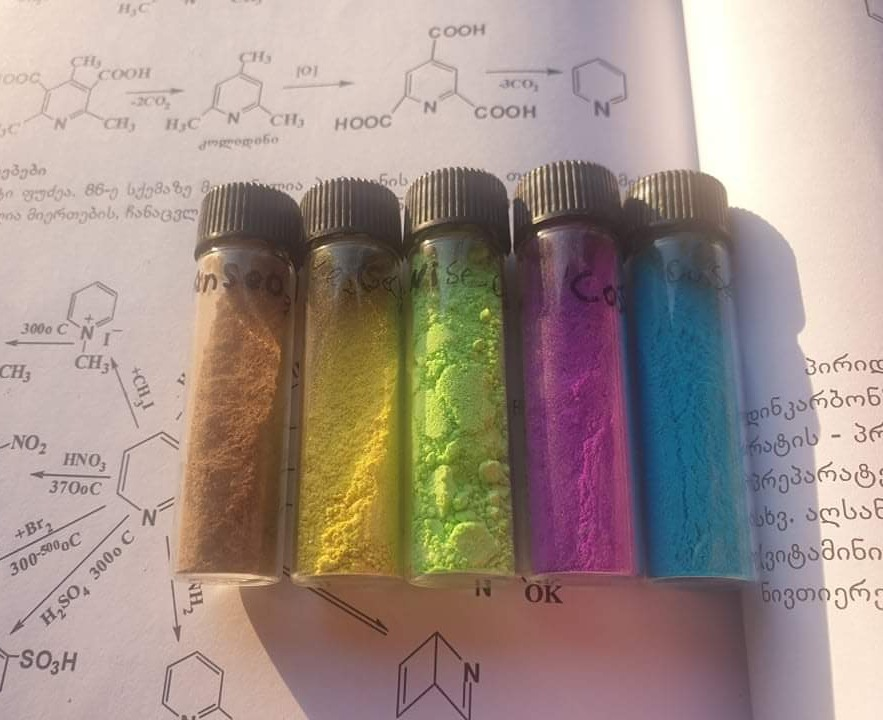
Mn, Fe(III), Ni, Co, Cu selenites

Selenite refers to the anion with the chemical formula SeO^{2−}_{3}. It is the oxyanion of selenium. It is the selenium analog of the sulfite ion, SO^{2−}_{3}. Thus selenite is pyramidal and selenium is assigned oxidation state +4. Selenite also refers to compounds that contains this ion, for example sodium selenite Na_{2}SeO_{3} which is a common source of selenite. Selenite also refers to the esters of selenous acid, for example dimethyl selenite (CH_{3})_{2}SeO_{3}.

== Synthesis and reactions ==
Selenite salts can be prepared by neutralizing solutions of selenous acid, which is generated by dissolving selenium dioxide in water. The process proceeds via the hydrogenselenite ion, HSeO^{−}_{3}.

Most selenite salts can be formed by heating the metal oxide with selenium dioxide, e.g.:

Na_{2}O + SeO_{2} → Na_{2}SeO_{3}
