= Selenous acid =

- Structural formula

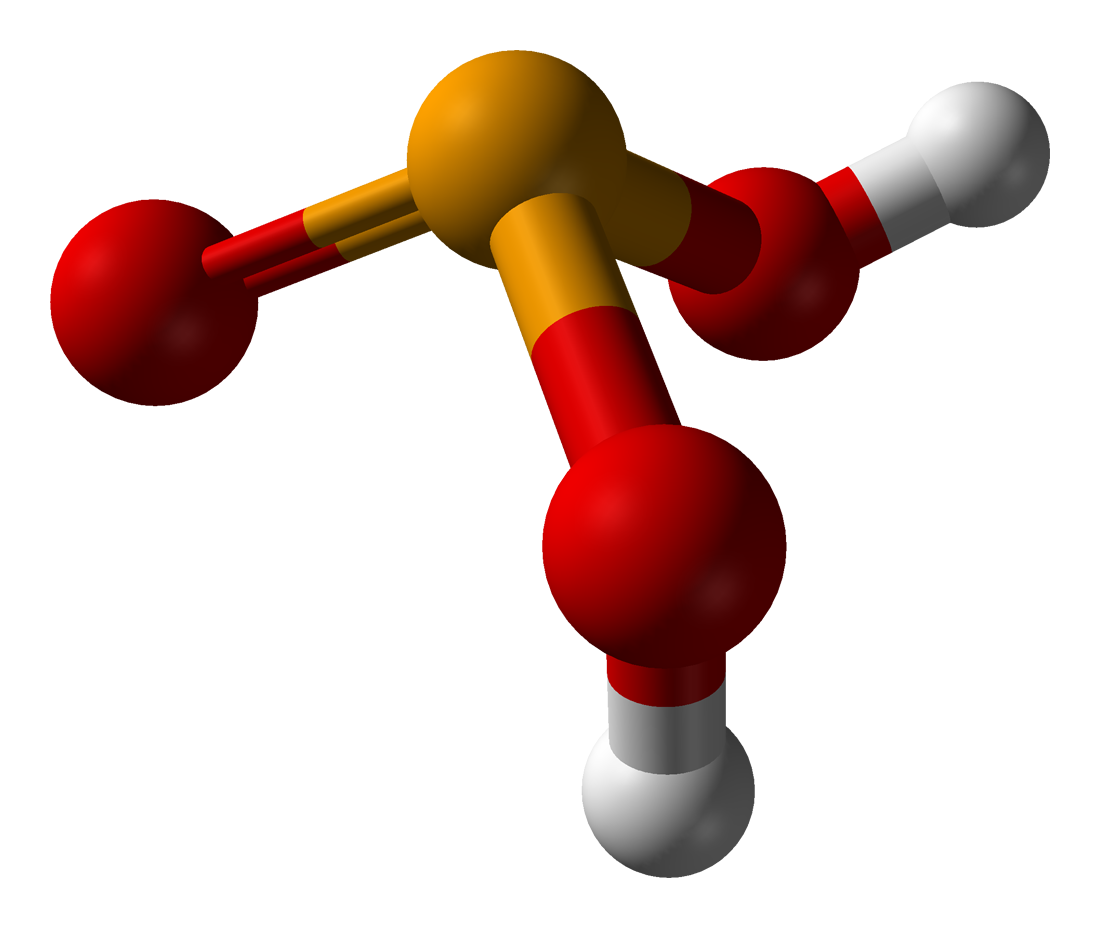
- Ball-and-stick model

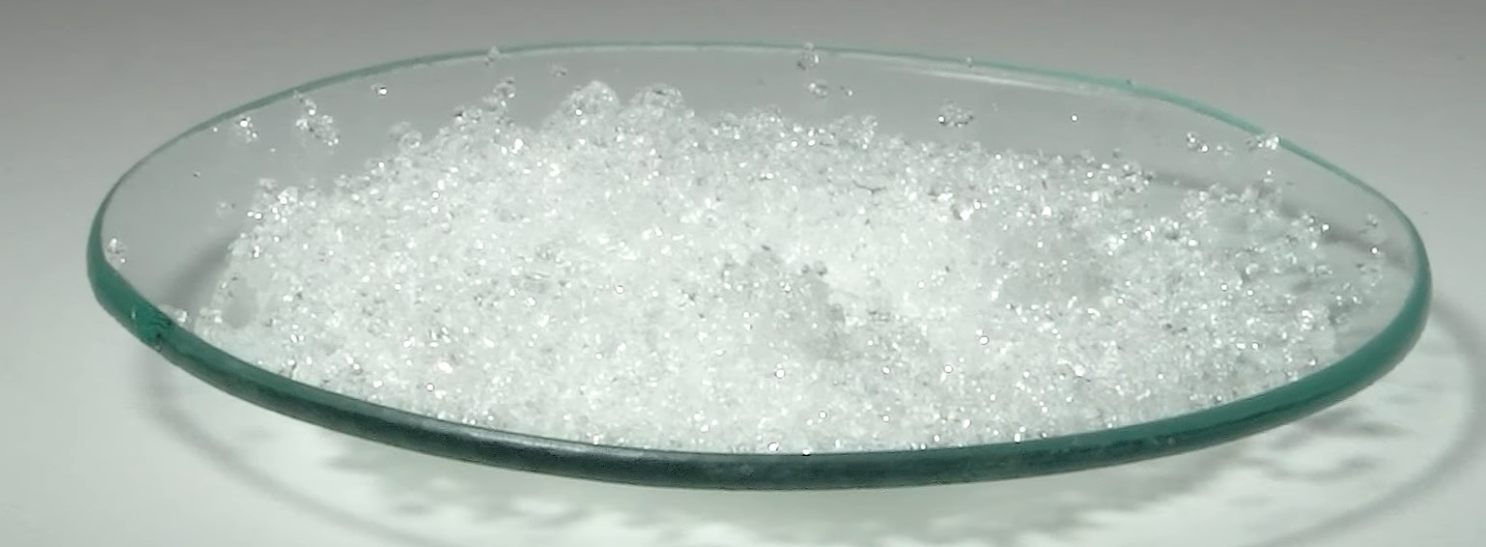
- Selenous acid on a watchglass

Names
- IUPAC names Selenous acid Selenic(IV) acid
- Other names Selenious acid

Identifiers
CAS Number	7783-00-8
3D model (JSmol)	Interactive image
ChEBI	CHEBI:26642
ChEMBL	ChEMBL2009089
ChemSpider	1060
DrugBank	DB11127
ECHA InfoCard	100.029.067
EC Number	231-974-7
KEGG	D05814
PubChem CID	1091
RTECS number	VS7175000
UNII	F6A27P4Q4R
UN number	3283 2630
CompTox Dashboard (EPA)	DTXSID9024300
- InChI: InChI=1S/H2O3Se/c1-4(2)3/h(H2,1,2,3) Key: MCAHWIHFGHIESP-UHFFFAOYSA-N; InChI=1/H2O3Se/c1-4(2)3/h(H2,1,2,3) Key: MCAHWIHFGHIESP-UHFFFAOYAW
- SMILES: O[Se+]([O-])O

Properties
Chemical formula	H_{2}SeO_{3}
Molar mass	128.984 g·mol^{−1}
Appearance	white hygroscopic crystals
Density	3.0 g/cm^{3}
Melting point	decomposes at 70 °C
Solubility in water	very soluble
Solubility	soluble in ethanol
Acidity (pK_{a})	pK_{a1} = 2.46 pK_{a2} = 7.3
Conjugate base	Hydrogenselenite
Magnetic susceptibility (χ)	−45.4·10^{−6} cm^{3}/mol

Pharmacology
Routes of administration	Intravenous infusion
Legal status	US: ℞-only

Hazards
- GHS labelling
Pictograms	(GHS06: Toxic) (GHS08: Health hazard) (GHS09: Environmental hazard)
Signal word	Danger
Hazard statements	H301, H331, H373, H410
Precautionary statements	P260, P264, P270, P271, P273, P301+P310, P304+P340, P311, P314, P321, P330, P391, P403+P233, P405, P501

Related compounds
Other anions	Selenic acid Hydrogen selenide
Other cations	Sodium selenite
Related compounds	Sulfurous acid; Tellurous acid; Polonous acid
- Except where otherwise noted, data are given for materials in their standard state (at 25 °C [77 °F], 100 kPa). verify (what is ?) Infobox references

Selenious Acid
Clinical data
- AHFS/Drugs.com: Monograph
- License data: US DailyMed: Selenious_acid

Identifiers
- DrugBank: DB11127
- CompTox Dashboard (EPA): DTXSID9024300
- ECHA InfoCard: 100.029.067

Selenous acid (or selenious acid) is the chemical compound with the formula H_{2}SeO_{3}. Structurally, it is more accurately described by O=Se(OH)_{2}. It is the principal oxoacid of selenium; the other being selenic acid.

== Formation and properties ==
Selenous acid is analogous to sulfurous acid, but it is more readily isolated. Selenous acid is easily formed upon the addition of selenium dioxide to water. As a crystalline solid, the compound can be seen as pyramidal molecules that are interconnected with hydrogen bonds. In solution it is a diprotic acid:

H_{2}SeO_{3} ⇌ H^{+} + HSeO_{3}^{−} (pK_{a} = 2.62)
HSeO_{3}^{−} ⇌ H^{+} + SeO_{3}^{2−} (pK_{a} = 8.32)

It is moderately oxidizing in nature, but kinetically slow. In 1 M H^{+}:

H_{2}SeO_{3} + 4 H^{+} + 4 e^{−} ⇌ Se + 3 H_{2}O (E^{~~o~~} = +0.74 V)

In 1 M OH^{−}:

SeO_{3}^{2−} + 4 e^{−} + 3 H_{2}O ⇌ Se + 6 OH^{−} (E^{~~o~~} = −0.37 V)

Selenous acid is hygroscopic.

== Uses ==
The major use is in protecting and changing the color of steel, especially steel parts on firearms. The so-called cold-bluing process uses selenous acid, copper(II) nitrate, and nitric acid to change the color of the steel from silver-grey to blue-grey or black. Alternative procedures use copper sulfate and phosphoric acid instead. This process deposits a coating of copper selenide and is fundamentally different from other bluing processes which generate black iron oxide. Some older razor blades were also made of blued steel.

Another use for selenious acid is the chemical darkening and patination of copper, brass and bronze, producing a rich dark brown color that can be further enhanced with mechanical abrasion.

It is used in organic synthesis as an oxidizing agent for the synthesis of 1,2-dicarbonyl compounds, e.g. in laboratory preparation of glyoxal (oxaldehyde) from acetaldehyde.

Selenious acid is a key component of the Mecke reagent used for drug checking.

=== Medical ===
Selenous acid can supply the trace element indicated in people as a source of selenium.

== Health effects ==
Like many selenium compounds, selenous acid is highly toxic in excessive quantities, and ingestion of any significant quantity of selenous acid is usually fatal, however it is an approved dietary source in proper amounts. Symptoms of selenium poisoning can occur several hours after exposure, and may include stupor, nausea, severe hypotension and death.
