= Selenium compounds =

Chemical compounds containing selenium

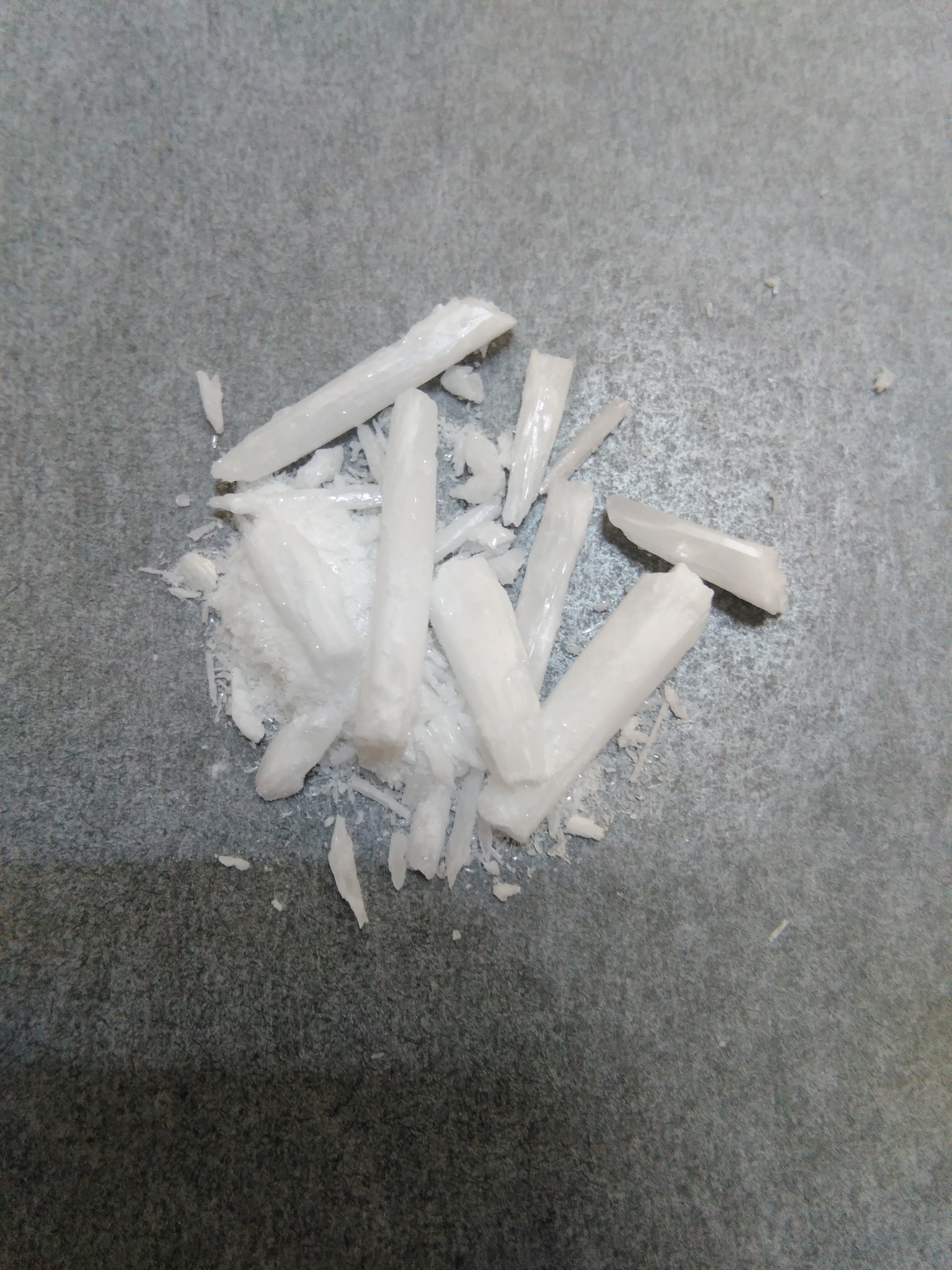
Selenium dioxide

Selenium compounds are compounds containing the element selenium (Se). Among these compounds, selenium has various oxidation states, the most common ones being −2, +4, and +6. Selenium compounds exist in nature in the form of various minerals, such as clausthalite, guanajuatite, tiemannite, crookesite etc., and can also coexist with sulfide minerals such as pyrite and chalcopyrite. For many mammals, selenium compounds are essential. For example, selenomethionine and selenocysteine are selenium-containing amino acids present in the human body. Selenomethionine participates in the synthesis of selenoproteins. The reduction potential and pKa (5.47) of selenocysteine are lower than those of cysteine, making some proteins have antioxidant activity. Selenium compounds have important applications in semiconductors, glass and ceramic industries, medicine, metallurgy and other fields.

== Chalcogen compounds and oxyacids ==
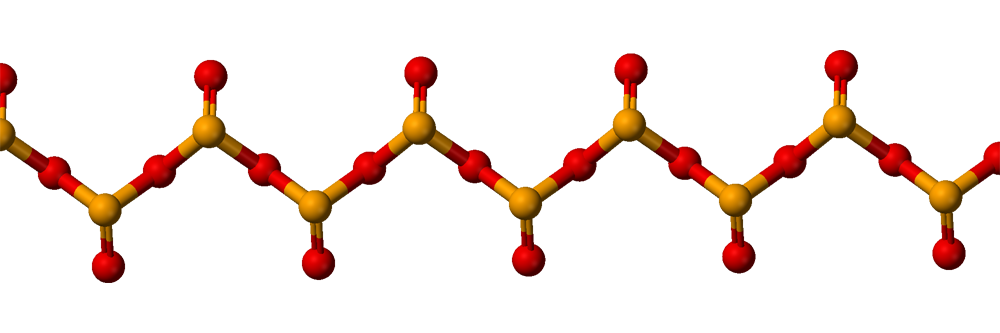
Structure of the polymer SeO_{2}: The (pyramidal) Se atoms are yellow.

Selenium forms two oxides: selenium dioxide (SeO_{2}) and selenium trioxide (SeO_{3}). Selenium dioxide is formed by the reaction of elemental selenium with oxygen:

$$\ce{Se8 + 8 O2 -> 8 SeO2}$$

It is a polymeric solid that forms monomeric SeO_{2} molecules in the gas phase. It dissolves in water to form selenous acid, H_{2}SeO_{3}. Selenous acid can also be made directly by oxidizing elemental selenium with nitric acid:

$$\ce{3 Se + 4 HNO3 + H2O -> 3 H2SeO3 + 4 NO}$$

Unlike sulfur, which forms a stable trioxide, selenium trioxide is thermodynamically unstable and decomposes to the dioxide above 185 °C:

$\ce{2 SeO3 -> 2 SeO2 + O2}$ (ΔH = −54 kJ/mol)

Selenium trioxide is produced in the laboratory by the reaction of anhydrous potassium selenate (K_{2}SeO_{4}) and sulfur trioxide (SO_{3}).

Salts of selenous acid are called selenites. These include silver selenite (Ag_{2}SeO_{3}) and sodium selenite (Na_{2}SeO_{3}).

Hydrogen sulfide reacts with aqueous selenous acid to produce selenium disulfide:

$$\ce{H2SeO3 + 2 H2S -> SeS2 + 3 H2O}$$

Selenium disulfide consists of 8-membered rings. It has an approximate composition of SeS_{2}, with individual rings varying in composition, such as Se_{4}S_{4} and Se_{2}S_{6}. Selenium disulfide has been used in shampoo as an antidandruff agent, an inhibitor in polymer chemistry, a glass dye, and a reducing agent in fireworks.

Selenium trioxide may be synthesized by dehydrating selenic acid, H_{2}SeO_{4}, which is itself produced by the oxidation of selenium dioxide with hydrogen peroxide:

$$\ce{SeO2 + H2O2 -> H2SeO4}$$

Hot, concentrated selenic acid can react with gold to form gold(III) selenate.

== Halogen compounds ==
Iodides of selenium are not well known. The only stable chloride is selenium monochloride (Se_{2}Cl_{2}), which might be better known as selenium(I) chloride; the corresponding bromide is also known. These species are structurally analogous to the corresponding disulfur dichloride. Selenium dichloride is an important reagent in the preparation of selenium compounds (e.g. the preparation of Se_{7}). It is prepared by treating selenium with sulfuryl chloride (SO_{2}Cl_{2}). Selenium reacts with fluorine to form selenium hexafluoride:

$$\ce{Se8 + 24 F2 -> 8 SeF6}$$

In comparison with its sulfur counterpart (sulfur hexafluoride), selenium hexafluoride (SeF_{6}) is more reactive and is a toxic pulmonary irritant. Some of the selenium oxyhalides, such as selenium oxyfluoride (SeOF_{2}) and selenium oxychloride (SeOCl_{2}) have been used as specialty solvents.

== Selenides ==
Analogous to the behavior of other chalcogens, selenium forms hydrogen selenide, H_{2}Se. It is a strongly odiferous, toxic, and colorless gas. It is more acidic than H_{2}S. In solution it ionizes to HSe^{−}. The selenide dianion Se^{2−} forms a variety of compounds, including the minerals from which selenium is obtained commercially. Illustrative selenides include mercury selenide (HgSe), lead selenide (PbSe), zinc selenide (ZnSe), and copper indium gallium diselenide (Cu(Ga,In)Se_{2}). These materials are semiconductors. With highly electropositive metals, such as aluminium, these selenides are prone to hydrolysis:

$$\ce{Al2Se3 + 3 H2O -> Al2O3 + 3 H2Se}$$

Alkali metal selenides react with selenium to form polyselenides, Se^{2−}_{n}, which exist as chains.

== Other compounds ==
Tetraselenium tetranitride, Se_{4}N_{4}, is an explosive orange compound analogous to tetrasulfur tetranitride (S_{4}N_{4}). It can be synthesized by the reaction of selenium tetrachloride (SeCl_{4}) with [((CH_{3})_{3}Si)_{2}N]_{2}Se.

Selenium reacts with cyanides to yield selenocyanates:

$$\ce{8 KCN + Se8 -> 8 KSeCN}$$

== Organoselenium compounds ==
Selenium, especially in the II oxidation state, forms stable bonds to carbon, which are structurally analogous to the corresponding organosulfur compounds. Especially common are selenides (R_{2}Se, analogues of thioethers), diselenides (R_{2}Se_{2}, analogues of disulfides), and selenols (RSeH, analogues of thiols). Representatives of selenides, diselenides, and selenols include respectively selenomethionine, diphenyldiselenide, and benzeneselenol. The sulfoxide in sulfur chemistry is represented in selenium chemistry by the selenoxides (formula RSe(O)R), which are intermediates in organic synthesis, as illustrated by the selenoxide elimination reaction. Consistent with trends indicated by the double bond rule, selenoketones, R(C=Se)R, and selenaldehydes, R(C=Se)H, are rarely observed.

== See also ==
- Arsenic compounds
- Bromine compounds
