= Gallium(III) selenate =

Names
- Other names Gallium selenate

Identifiers
CAS Number	16890-98-5
3D model (JSmol)	Interactive image; 16(H_{2}O): Interactive image; 22(H_{2}O): Interactive image
ChemSpider	154776
PubChem CID	129653371
CompTox Dashboard (EPA)	DTXSID50168624
- InChI: InChI=1S/2Ga.3H2O4Se/c;;3*1-5(2,3)4/h;;3*(H2,1,2,3,4)/q2*+3;;;/p-6 Key: ABFDJEJZFDLFAD-UHFFFAOYSA-H
- SMILES: O=[Se](=O)([O-])[O-].O=[Se](=O)([O-])[O-].O=[Se](=O)([O-])[O-].[Ga+3].[Ga+3]; 16(H_{2}O): O.O.O.O.O.O.O.O.O.O.O.O.O.O.O.O.O=[Se](=O)([O-])[O-].O=[Se](=O)([O-])[O-].O=[Se](=O)([O-])[O-].[Ga+3].[Ga+3]; 22(H_{2}O): O.O.O.O.O.O.O.O.O.O.O.O.O.O.O.O.O.O.O.O.O.O.O=[Se](=O)([O-])[O-].O=[Se](=O)([O-])[O-].O=[Se](=O)([O-])[O-].[Ga+3].[Ga+3]

Properties
Chemical formula	Ga_{2}(SeO_{4})_{3}
Molar mass	568.33 g/mol
Appearance	Colorless crystalline solid (hydrates)
Melting point	550 °C (1,022 °F; 823 K) decomposes
Solubility in water	Soluble
- Except where otherwise noted, data are given for materials in their standard state (at 25 °C [77 °F], 100 kPa). Infobox references

Gallium(III) selenate is an inorganic compound of gallium and the selenate ion, with the chemical formula Ga_{2}(SeO_{4})_{3}. Several hydrated forms have been reported.

== Properties ==
Gallium(III) selenate is readily soluble in water. Early measurements on hydrated material at 25 °C found approximately one part of the salt to dissolve in 1.74 parts of water.

Several hydration states have been reported. Air-dried crystals corresponding approximately to Ga_{2}(SeO_{4})_{3}·16H_{2}O were obtained, while freshly isolated crystals appeared to contain about 22 molecules of water per formula unit. A later thermochemical study reported an octadecahydrate, Ga_{2}(SeO_{4})_{3}·18H_{2}O.

An acidic selenate, GaH(SeO_{4})_{2}·10H_{2}O, has also been reported when gallium selenate is crystallized in the presence of excess selenic acid.

=== Structure ===
Anhydrous Ga_{2}(SeO_{4})_{3} is isostructural with the corresponding anhydrous aluminium selenate and with related trivalent-metal sulfates.

The structure is constructed from GaO_{6} coordination polyhedra and SeO_{4} tetrahedra linked through shared oxygen atoms.

=== Thermal decomposition ===
Hydrated gallium selenates lose water progressively on heating. The acidic selenate is converted to the normal selenate at approximately 300 °C.

Anhydrous Ga_{2}(SeO_{4})_{3} decomposes at about 550 °C, ultimately yielding gallium(III) oxide and volatile selenium oxides.

== Preparation ==
Gallium(III) selenate can be prepared by reaction of gallium(III) hydroxide with selenic acid:

2 Ga(OH)_{3} + 3 H_{2}SeO_{4} → Ga_{2}(SeO_{4})_{3} + 6 H_{2}O

An early preparation used a slight deficiency of selenic acid and excess gallium hydroxide. After digestion near the boiling point, excess hydroxide was filtered off and the solution was evaporated at room temperature to give hydrated gallium selenate crystals.

== Double salts ==
Gallium(III) selenate forms double salts with alkali metal selenates. The caesium compound CsGa(SeO_{4})_{2}·12H_{2}O is an alum-type salt and crystallizes in the characteristic octahedral habit of alums.

Sodium and potassium gallium selenate double salts have also been reported.
