= Cerium(IV) selenate =

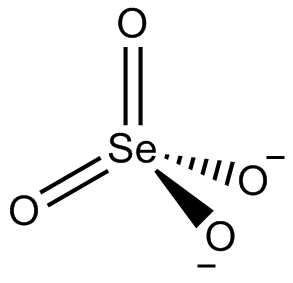
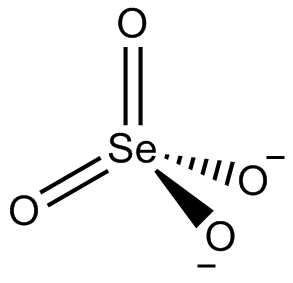

Identifiers
CAS Number	anhydrous: 131362-39-5; tetrahydrate: 65627-67-0
3D model (JSmol)	anhydrous: Interactive image; tetrahydrate: Interactive image
- InChI: InChI=1S/Ce.2H2O4Se/c;2*1-5(2,3)4/h;2*(H2,1,2,3,4)/q+4;;/p-4 Key: KFWCNHLRVFJXRB-UHFFFAOYSA-J
- SMILES: anhydrous: [Ce+4].[O-][Se](=O)(=O)[O-].[O-][Se]([O-])(=O)=O; tetrahydrate: [Ce+4].[O-][Se](=O)(=O)[O-].[O-][Se]([O-])(=O)=O.O.O.O.O

Properties
Chemical formula	Ce(SeO_{4})_{2}
Appearance	yellow crystals
Density	3.41 g·cm^{−3}
Solubility in water	insoluble

Related compounds
Other anions	cerium(IV) sulfate
Other cations	lanthanum(III) selenate praseodymium(III) selenate thorium(IV) selenate
Related compounds	cerium(III) selenate
- Except where otherwise noted, data are given for materials in their standard state (at 25 °C [77 °F], 100 kPa). Infobox references

Cerium(IV) selenate is an inorganic compound with the chemical formula Ce(SeO_{4})_{2}.

== Preparation ==
Cerium(IV) selenate can be obtained by reacting cerium(IV) hydroxide with hot selenic acid, and the tetrahydrate can be crystallized from the solution.

== Properties ==
Cerium(IV) selenate has a space group of Pbca, and its unit cell parameters are a = 9.748 Å, b = 9.174 Å, and c = 13.740 Å.

The tetrahydrate has orthorhombic space group Fddd with unit cell dimensions a = 27.31, b = 12.38, c = 5.736 Å.

It hydrolyzes when exposed to water and can be reduced to trivalent cerium using hydrogen peroxide.
