= Nickel(II) selenate =

Identifiers
CAS Number	15060-62-5 anhydrous; 10101-99-2 hexahydrate
3D model (JSmol)	Interactive image
ChemSpider	13704804
ECHA InfoCard	100.035.554
EC Number	239-125-2
PubChem CID	18690621
CompTox Dashboard (EPA)	DTXSID10934009
- InChI: InChI=1S/Ni.H2O4Se/c;1-5(2,3)4/h;(H2,1,2,3,4)/q+2;/p-2 Key: WCSBABHZOSWARI-UHFFFAOYSA-L
- SMILES: [Ni+2].[O-][Se](=O)(=O)[O-]

Properties
Chemical formula	NiSeO_{4}
Molar mass	201.64
Appearance	green solid
Density	4.8 g·cm^{−3} 2.314 g·cm^{−3} (hexahydrate)

Hazards
- GHS labelling
Pictograms	(GHS08: Health hazard) (GHS09: Environmental hazard)
Signal word	Danger
Hazard statements	H317, H334, H341, H350i, H360D, H372, H410
Precautionary statements	P203, P233, P260, P264, P270, P271, P272, P273, P280, P284, P302+P352, P304+P340, P318, P319, P321, P333+P317, P342+P316, P362+P364, P391, P403, P405, P501

Related compounds
Other anions	nickel(II) sulfate
Other cations	iron(II) selenate cobalt(II) selenate
- Except where otherwise noted, data are given for materials in their standard state (at 25 °C [77 °F], 100 kPa). Infobox references

Nickel(II) selenate is a selenate of nickel with the chemical formula NiSeO_{4}.

== Preparation ==
Nickel(II) selenate can be produced by the reaction of nickel(II) carbonate and selenic acid.

$$\mathrm{ NiCO_3 \ + H_2SeO_4 \rightarrow NiSeO_4 + H_2O + CO_2 \uparrow}$$

== Properties ==
Nickel(II) selenate hexahydrate is a green solid. It is tetragonal, space group P4_{1}2_{1}2 (No. 92). At 100 °C, nickel(II) selenate hexahydrate slowly loses water to the tetrahydrate, with space group P2_{1}/n (No. 14). At 510 °C, nickel(II) selenate decomposes directly into nickel selenite, which on further heating decomposes into nickel(II) oxide and selenium dioxide.

$$\mathrm{ NiSeO_4\cdot 6H_2O \ \xrightarrow[-H_2O]{100\,^\circ C}\ NiSeO_4\cdot 4H_2O \ \xrightarrow[-H_2O]{300\,^\circ C}\ NiSeO_4\cdot H_2O \ \xrightarrow[-H_2O]{390\,^\circ C}\ NiSeO_4 \ \xrightarrow[-O_2]{510\,^\circ C}\ NiSeO_3 \ \xrightarrow[-SeO_2]{690\,^\circ C}\ NiO }$$

It and potassium selenate are cooled and crystallized in hot aqueous solution to obtain the blue-green [Ni(H_{2}O)_{6}](SeO_{4})_{2}.

$$\mathrm{ K_2SeO_4 \ + NiSeO_4 + 6H_2O \rightarrow K_2[Ni(H_2O)_6](SeO_4)_2 }$$
