= Aluminium selenate =

Names
- Other names Aluminium(III) selenate

Identifiers
CAS Number	14696-77-6
3D model (JSmol)	Interactive image; hexadecahydrate: Interactive image
ChemSpider	146240
EC Number	238-746-6
PubChem CID	167146
CompTox Dashboard (EPA)	DTXSID00890746
- InChI: InChI=1S/2Al.3H2O4Se/c;;3*1-5(2,3)4/h;;3*(H2,1,2,3,4)/q2*+3;;;/p-6 Key: JSMYWMXSQDUVSJ-UHFFFAOYSA-H; hexadecahydrate: InChI=1S/2Al.3H2O4Se.16H2O/c;;3*1-5(2,3)4;;;;;;;;;;;;;;;;/h;;3*(H2,1,2,3,4);16*1H2/q2*+3;;;;;;;;;;;;;;;;;;;/p-6 Key: WMYSJGAGQBGILQ-UHFFFAOYSA-H
- SMILES: [O-][Se](=O)([O-])=O.[O-][Se](=O)([O-])=O.[O-][Se](=O)([O-])=O.[Al+3].[Al+3]; hexadecahydrate: [O-][Se](=O)(=O)[O-].[O-][Se](=O)(=O)[O-].[O-][Se](=O)(=O)[O-].[Al+3].[Al+3].O.O.O.O.O.O.O.O.O.O.O.O.O.O.O.O

Properties
Chemical formula	Al_{2}(SeO_{4})_{3}
Molar mass	482.84 g/mol
Appearance	Solid
Melting point	decomposes on heating
Solubility in water	Soluble in water
- Except where otherwise noted, data are given for materials in their standard state (at 25 °C [77 °F], 100 kPa). Infobox references

Aluminium selenate is an inorganic compound of aluminium and the selenate ion, with the chemical formula Al_{2}(SeO_{4})_{3}. Hydrated and basic aluminium selenates are also known.

== Properties ==
Several hydrated forms are known. A hexadecahydrate, Al_{2}(SeO_{4})_{3}·16H_{2}O, has been described, together with the basic selenate AlOH(H_{2}O)_{5}SeO_{4}.

Aluminium selenate also forms double salts with alkali metal selenates. For example, potassium aluminium selenate can be crystallized from mixed solutions of aluminium selenate and potassium selenate.

=== Structure ===
Anhydrous Al_{2}(SeO_{4})_{3} is isostructural with anhydrous iron(III) sulfate, Fe_{2}(SO_{4})_{3}.

The structure consists of AlO_{6} octahedra and SeO_{4} tetrahedra linked through shared oxygen atoms, as is typical of trivalent-metal selenates.

=== Thermal decomposition ===
Aluminium selenate is thermally less stable than the corresponding sulfate. On heating, it decomposes rather than melting cleanly.

Thermal decomposition proceeds through loss of selenium oxides and formation of aluminium oxide at higher temperature.

== Preparation ==
Aluminium selenate can be prepared by oxidation of aluminium selenite with hydrogen peroxide. Refluxing aluminium selenite with approximately 30% hydrogen peroxide converts Se(IV) to Se(VI) and gives aluminium selenate.

It can also be prepared by reacting aluminium hydroxide with a slight excess of selenic acid.
