= Samarium(III) selenate =

Names
- Other names Samarium selenate

Identifiers
3D model (JSmol)	Interactive image; octahydrate: Interactive image
ChemSpider	21428580
PubChem CID	25022142
- InChI: InChI=1S/3H2O4Se.2Sm/c3*1-5(2,3)4;;/h3*(H2,1,2,3,4);;/q;;;2*+3/p-6 Key: DHGXCGCAVJSFBP-UHFFFAOYSA-H; octahydrate: InChI=1S/3H2O4Se.8H2O.2Sm/c3*1-5(2,3)4;;;;;;;;;;/h3*(H2,1,2,3,4);8*1H2;;/q;;;;;;;;;;;2*+3/p-6 Key: GFBFYESNAYFCTI-UHFFFAOYSA-H
- SMILES: [O-][Se](=O)(=O)[O-].[O-][Se](=O)(=O)[O-].[O-][Se](=O)(=O)[O-].[Sm+3].[Sm+3]; octahydrate: O.O.O.O.O.O.O.O.[O-][Se](=O)(=O)[O-].[O-][Se](=O)(=O)[O-].[O-][Se](=O)(=O)[O-].[Sm+3].[Sm+3]

Properties
Chemical formula	Sm_{2}(SeO_{4})_{3}
Molar mass	729.57 g/mol
Appearance	White crystals (hydrates)
Solubility in water	Soluble in water
- Except where otherwise noted, data are given for materials in their standard state (at 25 °C [77 °F], 100 kPa). Infobox references

Samarium(III) selenate is an inorganic compound of samarium and the selenate ion, with the chemical formula Sm_{2}(SeO_{4})_{3}. Several hydrates are known, including the hexahydrate, heptahydrate and octahydrate.

== Structure and properties ==
Several hydrates of samarium(III) selenate have been reported, including the hexa-, hepta- and octahydrates.

The octahydrate crystallizes in the monoclinic crystal system, in space group C2/c (No. 15). Reported lattice parameters are a = 7.014(1) Å, b = 13.878(1) Å, c = 18.121(2) Å and β = 99.40(1)°.

The octahydrate is structurally analogous to several other rare-earth selenate octahydrates. The crystal structure contains Sm–O coordination polyhedra linked to SeO_{4} tetrahedra, together with coordinated and lattice water molecules.

At 25 °C, the solubility of Sm_{2}(SeO_{4})_{3}·8H_{2}O in water is about 0.582 mol of Sm_{2}(SeO_{4})_{3} per kilogram of water. Its solubility decreases strongly with increasing temperature, as is typical for a number of rare-earth selenates.

=== Thermal decomposition ===
Rare-earth selenate hydrates dehydrate in stages on heating before the anhydrous selenates themselves decompose at higher temperature.

For samarium selenate, heating first removes the water of crystallization. At higher temperatures, Se(VI) is reduced and selenium oxides are evolved, ultimately leaving samarium oxide as the stable high-temperature residue.

== Preparation ==
Samarium(III) selenate can be prepared by reaction of samarium(III) carbonate with selenic acid:

Sm_{2}(CO_{3})_{3} + 3 H_{2}SeO_{4} → Sm_{2}(SeO_{4})_{3} + 3 CO_{2}↑ + 3 H_{2}O

Crystallization from aqueous solution gives hydrated samarium selenates. The octahydrate, Sm_{2}(SeO_{4})_{3}·8H_{2}O, is the stable solid phase in equilibrium with saturated aqueous solution at 25 °C.
