= Praseodymium(III) selenate =

Names
- Other names Praseodymium(III) selenate(VI)

Identifiers
3D model (JSmol)	Interactive image
ChemSpider	15008002
PubChem CID	15801702
- InChI: InChI=1S/3H2O4Se.2Pr/c3*1-5(2,3)4;;/h3*(H2,1,2,3,4);;/q;;;2*+3/p-6 Key: RAKZQMKNASWERS-UHFFFAOYSA-H
- SMILES: [O-][Se](=O)(=O)[O-].[O-][Se](=O)(=O)[O-].[O-][Se](=O)(=O)[O-].[Pr+3].[Pr+3]

Properties
Chemical formula	Pr_{2}(SeO_{4})_{3}
Molar mass	710.6868 g/mol (anhydrous); 782.74792 g/mol (tetrahydrate); 800.7632 g/mol (pentahydrate); 836.79376 g/mol (heptahydrate); 854.80904 g/mol (octahydrate); 926.87016 g/mol (dodecahydrate)
Appearance	pale green crystals (heptahydrate)
Density	4.3 g/cm^{3} (anhydrous); 3.85 g/cm^{3} (tetrahydrate); 3.094 g/cm^{3} (octahydrate)
Solubility in water	36 g/100 mL (0 °C); 3 g/100 mL (92 °C)

Related compounds
Other anions	Praseodymium(III) sulfate
Other cations	Cerium(III) selenate Neodymium(III) selenate
- Except where otherwise noted, data are given for materials in their standard state (at 25 °C [77 °F], 100 kPa). Infobox references

Praseodymium(III) selenate is an inorganic compound, the salt of praseodymium and selenic acid with the chemical formula Pr_{2}(SeO_{4})_{3}. It forms green crystals when hydrated.

== Preparation ==
Praseodymium(III) selenate can be obtained by dissolving praseodymium(III) oxide in a solution of selenic acid:

Pr_{2}O_{3} + 3 H_{2}SeO_{4} → Pr_{2}(SeO_{4})_{3} + 3 H_{2}O

== Properties ==
Praseodymium(III) selenate dissolves in water, and forms green crystals when hydrated. These crystals are of Pr_{2}(SeO_{4})_{3}·nH_{2}O, where n = 4, 5, 7, 8 and 12. During crystallization from cold solutions, the octahydrate is formed, and the pentahydrate can be formed from hot solutions.

With potassium selenate and many other selenate salts, it forms double salts such as Pr_{2}(SeO_{4})_{3}·nK_{2}SeO_{4}·4H_{2}O (n = 1 and 3).
