= Holmium(III) selenate =

holmium selenate

Identifiers
CAS Number	anhydrate: 20148-59-8; octahydrate: 26299-25-2
3D model (JSmol)	anhydrate: Interactive image; octahydrate: Interactive image
- InChI: anhydrate: InChI=1S/2Ho.3H2O4Se/c;;3*1-5(2,3)4/h;;3*(H2,1,2,3,4)/q2*+3;;;/p-6 Key: RHIYEWNPRAWTOB-UHFFFAOYSA-H; octahydrate: InChI=1S/2Ho.3H2O4Se.8H2O/c;;3*1-5(2,3)4;;;;;;;;/h;;3*(H2,1,2,3,4);8*1H2/q2*+3;;;;;;;;;;;/p-6 Key: IFUPSIIMNGJVRI-UHFFFAOYSA-H
- SMILES: anhydrate: [O-][Se](=O)(=O)[O-].[O-][Se](=O)(=O)[O-].[O-][Se](=O)(=O)[O-].[Ho+3].[Ho+3]; octahydrate: O.O.O.O.O.O.O.O.[O-][Se](=O)(=O)[O-].[O-][Se](=O)(=O)[O-].[O-][Se](=O)(=O)[O-].[Ho+3].[Ho+3]

Properties
Chemical formula	Ho_{2}O_{12}Se_{3}
Molar mass	758.762 g·mol^{−1}
Appearance	solid
Solubility in water	soluble
- Except where otherwise noted, data are given for materials in their standard state (at 25 °C [77 °F], 100 kPa). Infobox references

Holmium(III) selenate is an inorganic compound with the chemical formula Ho_{2}(SeO_{4})_{3}. It exists in the anhydrous form and as an octahydrate. It can be obtained by dissolving holmium(III) oxide in selenic acid solution and evaporating and crystallizing it. It co-crystallizes with other selenates in solution to obtain complex salts such as K_{3}Ho(SeO_{4})_{3}·nH_{2}O, NH_{4}Ho(SeO_{4})_{2}·3H_{2}O and CH_{3}NH_{3}Ho(SeO_{4})_{2}·5H_{2}O.
