= Indium(III) selenate =

Names
- Other names Indium selenate

Identifiers
3D model (JSmol)	Interactive image
PubChem CID	129760250
- InChI: InChI=1S/2In.3H2O4Se/c;;3*1-5(2,3)4/h;;3*(H2,1,2,3,4)/q2*+3;;;/p-6 Key: DONSDNATLFRYPO-UHFFFAOYSA-H
- SMILES: O=[Se]1(=O)O[In](O1)O[Se](=O)(=O)O[In]2O[Se](=O)(=O)O2

Properties
Chemical formula	In_{2}(SeO_{4})_{3}
Molar mass	658.55 g/mol
Appearance	White hygroscopic crystals (hydrates)
Solubility in water	Very soluble in water
- Except where otherwise noted, data are given for materials in their standard state (at 25 °C [77 °F], 100 kPa). Infobox references

Indium(III) selenate is an inorganic compound of indium and the selenate ion, with the chemical formula In_{2}(SeO_{4})_{3}. It forms highly water-soluble, hygroscopic crystalline hydrates.

== Preparation ==
Indium(III) selenate can be prepared by dissolving indium(III) hydroxide in aqueous selenic acid and crystallizing the resulting solution.

2 In(OH)_{3} + 3 H_{2}SeO_{4} → In_{2}(SeO_{4})_{3} + 6 H_{2}O

The original preparation gave white, readily water-soluble, hygroscopic crystals whose analysis corresponded approximately to a decahydrate, In_{2}(SeO_{4})_{3}·10H_{2}O.

== Hydrates and solubility ==
Several hydrated forms of indium(III) selenate have been reported. Older literature describes the pentahydrate, octahydrate, nonahydrate and decahydrate.

At 293 K, the equilibrium solid phase in contact with saturated aqueous solution has been identified as the nonahydrate, In_{2}(SeO_{4})_{3}·9H_{2}O. The OECD/NEA review accepts a solubility of approximately 1.87 mol of In_{2}(SeO_{4})_{3} per kilogram of water at 293.15 K.

The pentahydrate, In_{2}(SeO_{4})_{3}·5H_{2}O, has also been structurally characterized. Its framework is closely related to those of Al_{2}(SO_{4})_{3}·5H_{2}O and Fe_{2}(SO_{4})_{3}·5H_{2}O.

== Structure ==
Anhydrous In_{2}(SeO_{4})_{3} crystallizes in the monoclinic crystal system, in space group P2_{1}/n (No. 14). Reported lattice parameters are approximately a = 8.73 Å, b = 9.21 Å, c = 12.26 Å and β = 91.63°, with four formula units per unit cell.

The structure belongs to the same general family as several trivalent-metal sulfates and selenates, with InO_{6} octahedra linked to SeO_{4} tetrahedra.

== Double salts and complexes ==
Indium(III) selenate forms double salts with alkali-metal selenates. The caesium compound CsIn(SeO_{4})_{2}·12H_{2}O was already reported in the early literature and crystallizes as colorless, water-soluble crystals.

Phase-equilibrium studies have also been reported for indium selenate with lithium, sodium, potassium, rubidium, caesium and ammonium selenates.

Indium(III) selenate also forms coordination compounds with organic ligands; for example, a bipyridine-containing selenate complex, In_{2}(2,2′-bipy)_{2}(SeO_{4})_{3}(H_{2}O)_{2}·2H_{2}O, contains two InO_{4}N_{2} octahedra bridged by selenate tetrahedra.
