= Lithium selenate =

Names
- Other names Dilithium selenate

Identifiers
CAS Number	15593-52-9; monohydrate: 7790-71-8
3D model (JSmol)	Interactive image; monohydrate: Interactive image
ChemSpider	146381; monohydrate: 24593582
ECHA InfoCard	100.036.046
EC Number	239-668-5
PubChem CID	167311; monohydrate: 53471885
UNII	LH73V5FKQ1; monohydrate: 5OH00UJ5VN
CompTox Dashboard (EPA)	DTXSID50889645; monohydrate: DTXSID80703784
- InChI: InChI=1S/2Li.H2O4Se/c;;1-5(2,3)4/h;;(H2,1,2,3,4)/q2*+1;/p-2 Key: JXTNYTBZEWFKNR-UHFFFAOYSA-L; monohydrate: InChI=1S/2Li.H2O4Se.H2O/c;;1-5(2,3)4;/h;;(H2,1,2,3,4);1H2/q2*+1;;/p-2 Key: MHMRPQJMUGLBGK-UHFFFAOYSA-L
- SMILES: [Li+].[Li+].[O-][Se](=O)(=O)[O-]; monohydrate: [Li+].[Li+].O.[O-][Se](=O)(=O)[O-]

Properties
Chemical formula	Li_{2}SeO_{4}
Molar mass	156.84 g/mol
Appearance	Colorless crystals
Density	2.99 g/cm^{3}
Solubility in water	Soluble in water

Structure
Crystal structure	Trigonal
Space group	R3̅, No. 148
- Except where otherwise noted, data are given for materials in their standard state (at 25 °C [77 °F], 100 kPa). Infobox references

Lithium selenate is an inorganic compound of lithium and the selenate ion, with the chemical formula Li_{2}SeO_{4}. It is a colorless, water-soluble crystalline salt. It forms a well-characterized monohydrate, Li_{2}SeO_{4}·H_{2}O, which is a polar and pyroelectric crystal.

== Preparation ==
Lithium selenate can be prepared by neutralizing selenic acid with lithium carbonate:

Li_{2}CO_{3} + H_{2}SeO_{4} → Li_{2}SeO_{4} + CO_{2}↑ + H_{2}O

Crystallization from aqueous solution generally gives the hydrated salt. Large single crystals of the monohydrate have been grown from aqueous solution at about 343 K.

== Properties ==
=== Structure ===
Anhydrous Li_{2}SeO_{4} crystallizes in the trigonal crystal system, in space group R3̅ (No. 148). Its crystal structure was refined by Pertlik and Fuith in 1989.

The structure consists of isolated SeO_{4}^{2−} tetrahedra connected through lithium–oxygen coordination polyhedra.

=== Monohydrate ===
Lithium selenate monohydrate, Li_{2}SeO_{4}·H_{2}O, crystallizes in the monoclinic space group P2_{1} (No. 4). At room temperature its lattice parameters are approximately a = 5.580 Å, b = 5.028 Å, c = 8.452 Å and β = 107.63°, with two formula units per unit cell.

It is isostructural with lithium sulfate monohydrate. The crystal structure contains LiO_{4} and LiO_{3}(H_{2}O) tetrahedra together with SeO_{4} tetrahedra. These share oxygen vertices to form a three-dimensional framework.

Because space group P2_{1} is polar, the monohydrate is pyroelectric. Its pyroelectric coefficient and thermal expansion have been measured between approximately 183 and 343 K.

The crystal is also optically anisotropic. Refractive indices have been measured over wavelengths from 365 to 1530 nm, and calculations indicate that Li_{2}SeO_{4}·H_{2}O permits both type-I and type-II phase matching for second-harmonic generation from wavelengths of roughly 650 nm into the near-infrared.

=== Thermal behaviour ===
Hydrated lithium selenate loses water on heating. Thermogravimetric studies of hydrated samples found dehydration mainly between about 120 and 250 °C.

At still higher temperature, molten Li_{2}SeO_{4} is progressively reduced to lithium selenite, Li_{2}SeO_{3}, between approximately 650 and 850 °C.

Li_{2}SeO_{4} → Li_{2}SeO_{3} + 1/2 O_{2}

Above about 900 °C, further mass loss occurs through decomposition and volatilization of the selenite; lithium oxide remains among the final solid products.
