= Copper(II) selenate =

Names
- Other names Cupric selenate

Identifiers
CAS Number	anhydrous: 15123-69-0; pentahydrate: 10031-45-5
3D model (JSmol)	anhydrous: Interactive image; pentahydrate: Interactive image
ChemSpider	anhydrous: 146322; pentahydrate: 21391724
ECHA InfoCard	100.035.605
EC Number	anhydrous: 239-181-8
PubChem CID	anhydrous: 167246; pentahydrate: 24884279
UNII	anhydrous: 6G660O441V; pentahydrate: S6B03F6355
CompTox Dashboard (EPA)	DTXSID20884788; pentahydrate: DTXSID60143129
- InChI: anhydrous: InChI=1S/Cu.H2O4Se/c;1-5(2,3)4/h;(H2,1,2,3,4)/q+2;/p-2 Key: RGZGHMSJVAQDQO-UHFFFAOYSA-L; pentahydrate: InChI=1S/Cu.H2O4Se.5H2O/c;1-5(2,3)4;;;;;/h;(H2,1,2,3,4);5*1H2/q+2;;;;;;/p-2 Key: JTBUDWDECDEFLW-UHFFFAOYSA-L
- SMILES: anhydrous: [O-][Se](=O)(=O)[O-].[Cu+2]; pentahydrate: O.O.O.O.O.O=[Se](=O)([O-])[O-].[Cu+2]

Properties
Chemical formula	CuSeO_{4}
Molar mass	206.50 g/mol
Appearance	Pale blue crystals (pentahydrate)
Density	2.576 g/cm^{3} (pentahydrate)
Solubility in water	Soluble
Solubility in ethanol	Insoluble
- Except where otherwise noted, data are given for materials in their standard state (at 25 °C [77 °F], 100 kPa). Infobox references

Copper(II) selenate is an inorganic compound of copper and the selenate ion, with the chemical formula CuSeO_{4}. The best-known form is the pale-blue pentahydrate, CuSeO_{4}·5H_{2}O.

== Structure and properties ==
Copper(II) selenate pentahydrate crystallizes in the triclinic crystal system, in space group P1̅, and is isotypic with copper(II) sulfate pentahydrate.

Its lattice parameters are a = 6.083 Å, b = 6.226 Å and c = 10.867 Å, with α = 77.14°, β = 82.20° and γ = 72.91°, and two formula units per unit cell.

The Cu^{2+} ions are surrounded by six oxygen atoms in strongly distorted octahedral environments as a result of the Jahn–Teller effect. Four coordination positions are occupied by water molecules and two by selenate oxygen atoms.

Anhydrous CuSeO_{4} crystallizes in the monoclinic space group P2_{1}/n and adopts the MnAsO_{4} structure type. The Cu^{2+} ions again show pronounced [4+2] coordination, and their coordination polyhedra are linked into chains along the crystallographic a axis.

Copper(II) selenate is soluble in water but insoluble in ethanol.

=== Thermal decomposition ===
The pentahydrate undergoes stepwise dehydration on heating. Thermogravimetric and mass-spectrometric studies show that dehydration occurs in three stages and is complete by about 300 °C.

The anhydrous salt decomposes at higher temperatures through several successive reactions between approximately 480 and 900 °C. Oxygen is released first, followed by evolution of selenium dioxide and formation of copper oxides.

== Preparation ==
Copper(II) selenate can be prepared by dissolving copper(II) oxide in selenic acid:

CuO + H_{2}SeO_{4} → CuSeO_{4} + H_{2}O

Crystallization from aqueous solution gives the pentahydrate.

Anhydrous CuSeO_{4} can also be prepared hydrothermally from metallic copper and selenic acid at about 220 °C.
