= Zinc selenate =

Names
- Other names Zinc(II) selenate

Identifiers
CAS Number	13597-54-1
3D model (JSmol)	Interactive image
ChemSpider	7988881
ECHA InfoCard	100.033.668
EC Number	237-051-5
PubChem CID	9813131
UNII	031117TWZ1
UN number	2630
CompTox Dashboard (EPA)	DTXSID50929191
- InChI: InChI=1S/H2O4Se.Zn/c1-5(2,3)4;/h(H2,1,2,3,4);/q;+2/p-2 Key: GQLBMRKEAODAKR-UHFFFAOYSA-L
- SMILES: [O-][Se](=O)(=O)[O-].[Zn+2]

Properties
Chemical formula	ZnSeO_{4}
Molar mass	208.35 g/mol
Appearance	Crystalline solid
Solubility in water	Soluble

Hazards
- GHS labelling
Pictograms	(GHS06: Toxic)
Signal word	Danger
Hazard statements	H301, H331, H373, H410
Precautionary statements	P260, P264, P270, P271, P273, P301+P316, P304+P340, P316, P319, P321, P330, P391, P403+P233, P405, P501
- Except where otherwise noted, data are given for materials in their standard state (at 25 °C [77 °F], 100 kPa). Infobox references

Zinc selenate is an inorganic compound of zinc and the selenate ion, with the chemical formula ZnSeO_{4}. Several hydrated forms are known, including the monohydrate and hexahydrate.

== Structure and properties ==
Zinc selenate hexahydrate crystallizes in the tetragonal crystal system in the chiral space group P4_{1}2_{1}2 or its enantiomorphic counterpart P4_{3}2_{1}2.

For one optically levorotatory crystal, the lattice parameters are a = 6.947(1) Å and c = 18.592(1) Å, with four formula units per unit cell and a calculated density of 2.342 g/cm^{3}.

The crystal is optically active because the hydrate adopts a chiral crystal structure. Its optical rotatory dispersion has been measured between approximately 366 and 633 nm.

Other hydrates are also known. Zinc selenate monohydrate, ZnSeO_{4}·H_{2}O, can form at higher temperatures, while the hexahydrate is favored at lower temperatures.

=== Thermal decomposition ===
Hydrated zinc selenate loses water on heating before the anhydrous selenate decomposes at higher temperature. Thermal analysis studies of divalent-metal selenates found zinc selenate to be among the more thermally stable members of the series.

Further heating ultimately gives zinc oxide as the zinc-containing residue.

== Preparation ==
Zinc selenate can be prepared by reaction of zinc oxide with selenic acid:

ZnO + H_{2}SeO_{4} → ZnSeO_{4} + H_{2}O

Hydrated zinc selenate can also be obtained by precipitation or crystallization from aqueous zinc and selenate solutions. Crystallization from water commonly gives zinc selenate hexahydrate, ZnSeO_{4}·6H_{2}O.

== Applications ==
Zinc selenate has been used as a precursor for the preparation of zinc selenide. Reduction of hydrated zinc selenate under carbon monoxide can produce nanocrystalline ZnSe at temperatures around 460 °C.
