= Selenic =

Selenic may refer to:

- Selenic acid
- relative to The Moon
