= Lanthanum hydroxycarbonate =

Names
- Other names Lanthanum carbonate hydroxide

Identifiers
| CAS Number | 198017-16-2 |
| 3D model (JSmol) | Interactive image |
| ChemSpider | 9826170 |
| PubChem CID | 11651432 |
| UNII | WW3F2A2FJM |
| CompTox Dashboard (EPA) | DTXSID50470032 |
- InChI: InChI=1S/CH2O3.La.H2O/c2-1(3)4;;/h(H2,2,3,4);;1H2/q;+3;/p-3 Key: VYGHOXHBHAWHDO-UHFFFAOYSA-K
- SMILES: C(=O)([O-])[O-].[OH-].[La+3]

Properties
| Chemical formula | LaOHCO_{3} |
| Molar mass | 215.92 g/mol |
| Appearance | White crystalline solid |
| Density | 4.48 g/cm^{3} |
| Melting point | 310 °C (decomposes) |
- Except where otherwise noted, data are given for materials in their standard state (at 25 °C [77 °F], 100 kPa). Infobox references

Lanthanum hydroxycarbonate, also known as lanthanum carbonate hydroxide, is an inorganic compound of lanthanum with the chemical formula LaOHCO_{3}. It occurs in several crystalline forms and can be converted thermally into lanthanum oxycarbonate and ultimately lanthanum oxide.

== Structure and properties ==
Lanthanum hydroxycarbonate is known in both orthorhombic and hexagonal forms. The orthorhombic phase has been reported in space group Pmcn.

The phase obtained depends on synthesis conditions. In hydrothermal synthesis on glass substrates, the lower-temperature orthorhombic material formed discrete flaky rhombic crystals, whereas the higher-temperature hexagonal phase formed compact rhomboidal crystals.

The hexagonal form has been reported to exhibit significant second-harmonic generation, making it of interest as a non-linear optical material.

Hydrated lanthanum hydroxycarbonate phases are also known; these lose their water of crystallization on heating.

Nanostructured LaOHCO_{3} also exhibits photoluminescence. Hierarchical material prepared by polyvinylpyrrolidone (PVP)-assisted hydrothermal synthesis showed emission near 420 nm, with intensity dependent on particle morphology and size.

=== Thermal decomposition ===
Lanthanum hydroxycarbonate decomposes in stages on heating. The first stage produces lanthanum oxycarbonate, La_{2}O_{2}CO_{3}, with loss of water and carbon dioxide:

2 LaOHCO_{3} → La_{2}O_{2}CO_{3} + H_{2}O + CO_{2}

Further heating decomposes the oxycarbonate to lanthanum oxide:

La_{2}O_{2}CO_{3} → La_{2}O_{3} + CO_{2}

The exact decomposition temperatures depend on preparation conditions, particle morphology and experimental atmosphere. Studies have reported onset of conversion to the oxycarbonate from approximately 310–430 °C and conversion of the oxycarbonate to La_{2}O_{3} at higher temperatures.

== Preparation ==
Lanthanum hydroxycarbonate can be prepared from aqueous solutions of a lanthanum salt in the presence of carbonate or carbon dioxide. One route uses lanthanum nitrate, ammonia and carbon dioxide.

A simplified sequence is:

La(NO_{3})_{3} + 3 NH_{4}OH → La(OH)_{3} + 3 NH_{4}NO_{3}

CO_{2} + H_{2}O ⇌ H_{2}CO_{3}

La(OH)_{3} + H_{2}CO_{3} → LaOHCO_{3} + 2 H_{2}O

Hydrothermal methods can be used to control both the morphology and crystal structure of the product. Orthorhombic LaOHCO_{3} has been obtained at about 160 °C, whereas synthesis at about 180 °C gives the hexagonal phase.

Polyvinylpyrrolidone-assisted hydrothermal synthesis has also been used to produce hierarchical LaOHCO_{3} microspheres composed of plates and nanorods.
