= Lanthanum(III) sulfate =

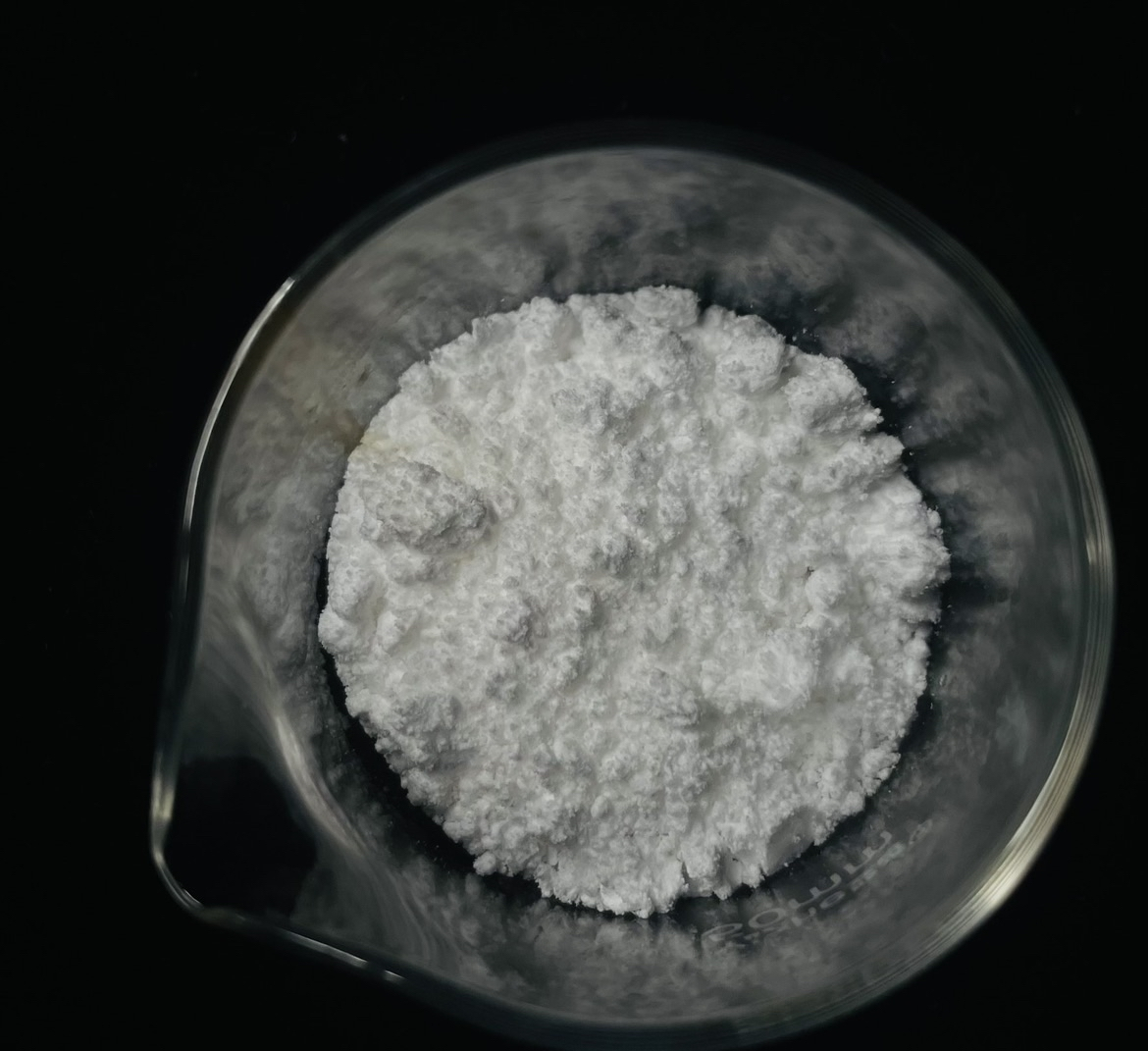
- Nonahydrate

Names
- Other names: Lanthanum sulfate

Identifiers
CAS Number	10099-60-2
3D model (JSmol)	Interactive image
ChemSpider	140072
ECHA InfoCard	100.030.204
EC Number	233-239-6
PubChem CID	159259
UNII	4636PY459O
UN number	4636PY459O
CompTox Dashboard (EPA)	DTXSID00890640
- InChI: Key: VQEHIYWBGOJJDM-UHFFFAOYSA-H; InChI=1S/2La.3H2O4S/c;;3*1-5(2,3)4/h;;3*(H2,1,2,3,4)/q2*+3;;;/p-6
- SMILES: [O-]S(=O)(=O)[O-].[O-]S(=O)(=O)[O-].[O-]S(=O)(=O)[O-].[La+3].[La+3]

Properties
Chemical formula	La_{2}(SO_{4})_{3}
Molar mass	566.00 g/mol
Appearance	White solid
Density	2.82 g/cm^{3} (nonahydrate)
Melting point	775 °C (1,427 °F; 1,048 K) (decomposition)
Solubility in water	2.7 g/100 mL (20 °C, nonahydrate)
Solubility	insoluble in ethanol

Structure
Crystal structure	hexagonal
Space group	P6_{3}
Lattice constant	a = 11.01 Å, c = 8.08 Å

Hazards
- GHS labelling
Pictograms	(GHS07: Exclamation mark)
Signal word	Warning
Hazard statements	H315, H319, H335
Precautionary statements	P261, P264, P264+P265, P271, P280, P302+P352, P304+P340, P305+P351+P338, P319, P321, P332+P317, P337+P317, P362+P364, P403+P233, P405, P501
NFPA 704 (fire diamond)	0 0 1

Related compounds
Other anions	Lanthanum(III) nitrate
Other cations	Cerium(III) sulfate
- Except where otherwise noted, data are given for materials in their standard state (at 25 °C [77 °F], 100 kPa). Infobox references

Lanthanum(III) sulfate is an inorganic compound with the formula La_{2}(SO_{4})_{3}·xH_{2}O (0 ≤ x ≤ 9). It forms various hydrates, the most common one being the nonahydrate, which are all white solids. It is an intermediate in producing lanthanum from its ores.

== Preparation and reactions ==
The nonahydrate is produced by dissolving lanthanum or lanthanum hydroxide in dilute sulfuric acid, then evaporating the solution:

2 La + 3 H_{2}SO_{4} → La_{2}(SO_{4})_{3} + 3 H_{2}

The anhydrous compound can be produced by heating the hydrates to 300 °C. If heated further, anhydrous lanthanum(III) sulfate decomposes to La_{2}O_{2}SO_{4} at 775 °C, which in turn decomposes to lanthanum(III) oxide at 1100 °C.

== Structure ==
The nonahydrate crystallizes in a hexagonal crystal system, which contains the lanthanum atoms in two different environments.

== Bibliography ==
- Greenwood, Norman N.; Earnshaw, Alan (1984). Chemistry of the Elements. Oxford: Pergamon Press. ISBN 978-0-08-022057-4.
