= Cobalt(II) selenate =

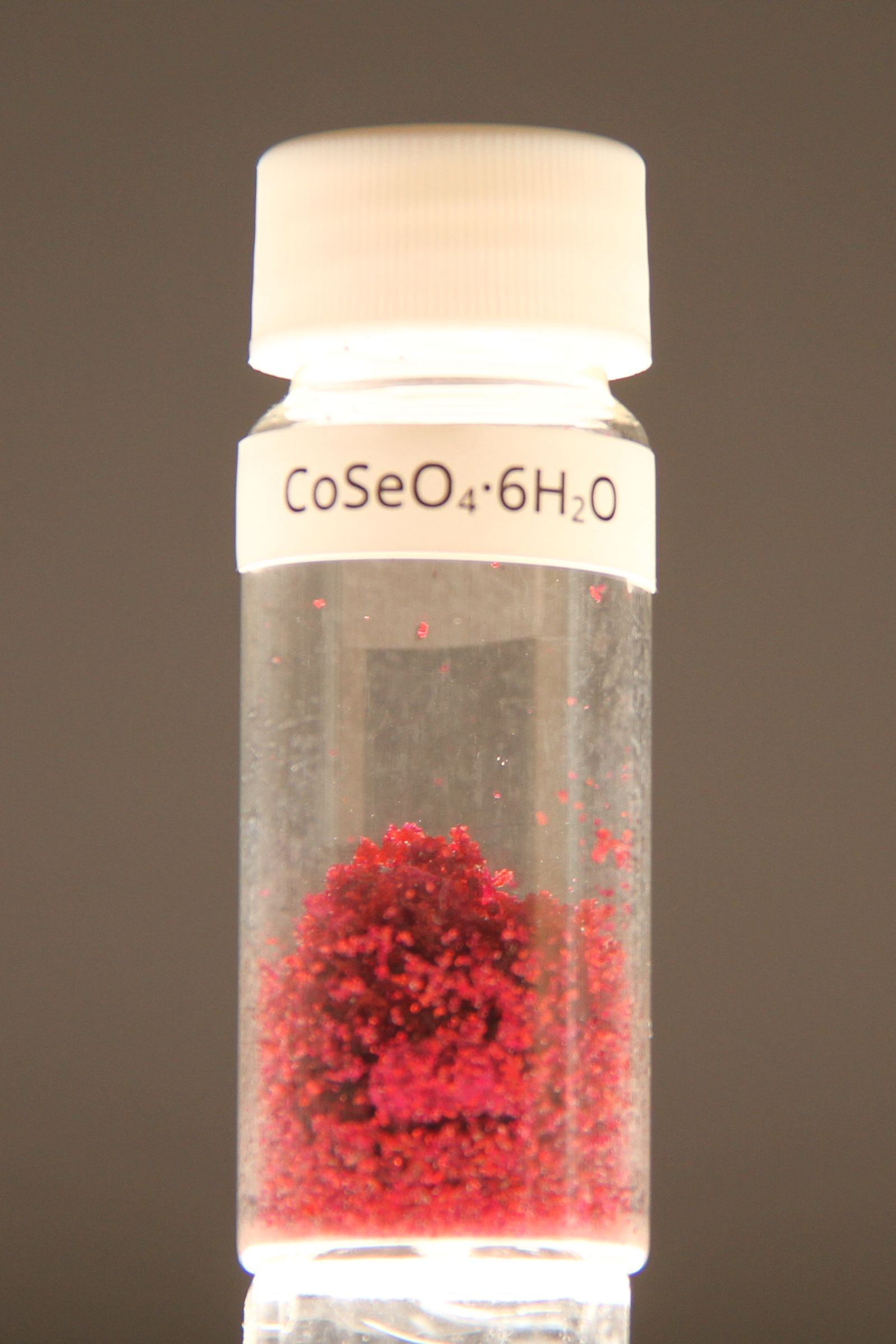

Names
- Other names Cobaltous selenate

Identifiers
CAS Number	14590-19-3
3D model (JSmol)	Interactive image
ECHA InfoCard	100.035.107
EC Number	238-634-7
PubChem CID	167121
CompTox Dashboard (EPA)	DTXSID60884762
- SMILES: [O-][Se](=O)(=O)[O-].[Co+2]

Properties
Chemical formula	CoSeO_{4}
Molar mass	201.90 g/mol
Appearance	Violet crystalline solid (anhydrous)
Density	4.51 g/cm^{3} (anhydrous)
Solubility in water	Soluble in water

Structure
Crystal structure	Orthorhombic
Space group	Pnma, No. 62
Lattice constant	a = 0.9042 nm, b = 0.6767 nm, c = 0.4886 nm
Formula units (Z)	4
- Except where otherwise noted, data are given for materials in their standard state (at 25 °C [77 °F], 100 kPa). Infobox references

Cobalt(II) selenate is an inorganic compound of cobalt and the selenate ion, with the chemical formula CoSeO_{4}. The anhydrous compound is a violet crystalline solid. It is soluble in water and forms several crystalline hydrates.

== Preparation ==
Cobalt(II) selenate can be prepared by neutralizing selenic acid with cobalt(II) carbonate or basic cobalt carbonate:

CoCO_{3} + H_{2}SeO_{4} → CoSeO_{4} + CO_{2}↑ + H_{2}O

A modern preparation used basic cobalt carbonate, Co_{2}CO_{3}(OH)_{2}, and selenic acid at about 70 °C. Slow evaporation at room temperature produced dark red CoSeO_{4}·6H_{2}O crystals. Heating the hexahydrate at 125 °C yielded the monohydrate, and prolonged heating at 315 °C gave anhydrous CoSeO_{4}.

== Properties ==
=== Structure ===
Anhydrous CoSeO_{4} crystallizes in the orthorhombic crystal system, in space group Pnma (No. 62). At 300 K (27 °C), neutron diffraction gives lattice parameters a = 9.0421 Å, b = 6.7669 Å and c = 4.8860 Å.

The structure is analogous to β-CoSO_{4}. It consists of chains of edge-sharing CoO_{6} octahedra, with neighboring chains linked through SeO_{4}^{2−} tetrahedra. The octahedral chains are alternately tilted relative to the crystallographic axes.

Older literature sometimes describes the same structure in the non-standard space-group setting Pbnm.

=== Hydrates ===
Several hydrates of cobalt(II) selenate are known, including the mono-, tetra-, penta-, hexa- and heptahydrates. Thermal-dehydration studies have also identified a dihydrate as an intermediate phase.

The pentahydrate, CoSeO_{4}·5H_{2}O, crystallizes in the triclinic system, space group P1̅, with lattice parameters a = 6.435 Å, b = 10.703 Å, c = 6.220 Å, α = 98.71°, β = 109.60° and γ = 75.54°, with two formula units per unit cell.

It is isostructural with CuoSO_{4}·5H_{2}O. Four water molecules coordinate directly to cobalt, while the fifth occupies an interstitial position in the hydrogen-bonded structure.

The tetrahydrate, CoSeO_{4}·4H_{2}O, is monoclinic, space group P2_{1}/n, with lattice parameters approximately a = 6.00 Å, b = 13.84 Å, c = 8.06 Å and β = 90.9°.

=== Thermal behaviour ===
Dehydration of CoSeO_{4}·6H_{2}O proceeds stepwise. The pentahydrate, tetrahydrate, dihydrate and monohydrate have all been detected as intermediate phases before formation of anhydrous CoSeO_{4}.

At still higher temperatures, anhydrous cobalt selenate decomposes through lower selenium oxyanion phases, ultimately yielding cobalt oxide while selenium oxides and oxygen are evolved.

=== Magnetic and dielectric properties ===
CoSeO_{4} is an antiferromagnetic chain compound. Magnetic susceptibility and neutron-diffraction measurements show the development of long-range magnetic order below about 30 K (−243.2 °C).

In the ordered state, spins along each cobalt chain are predominantly antiferromagnetically aligned, with neighboring chains also coupled antiferromagnetically. At 5 K (−268.15 °C) the ordered cobalt moment is about 3.5 μ_{B}.

Application of a magnetic field below the ordering temperature produces a field-induced spin reorientation toward the crystallographic c axis. The dielectric constant changes slope at the magnetic ordering temperature, and its field dependence changes strongly across the spin-reorientation transition, indicating coupling between magnetic and dielectric degrees of freedom.
