= Iron(II) selenate =

Names
- Other names Ferrous selenate

Identifiers
CAS Number	(anhydrous): 15857-43-9; (pentahydrate): 70807-08-8
3D model (JSmol)	(anhydrous): Interactive image; (pentahydrate): Interactive image
PubChem CID	(anhydrous): 159739849
- InChI: (anhydrous): InChI=1S/Fe.H2O4Se/c;1-5(2,3)4/h;(H2,1,2,3,4)/q+2;/p-2 Key: NCHUFZYUFAWBQI-UHFFFAOYSA-L; (pentahydrate): InChI=1S/Fe.H2O4Se.5H2O/c;1-5(2,3)4;;;;;/h;(H2,1,2,3,4);5*1H2/q+2;;;;;;/p-2 Key: YXLBLVIIVLRXHU-UHFFFAOYSA-L
- SMILES: (anhydrous): [O-][Se](=O)(=O)[O-].[Fe+2]; (pentahydrate): [O-][Se](=O)(=O)[O-].[Fe+2].O.O.O.O.O

Properties
Chemical formula	FeSeO_{4}
Molar mass	198.8046 g/mol (anhydrous); 288.881 g/mol (pentahydrate); 324.91156 g/mol (heptahydrate)
Appearance	green, unstable crystalline solid (heptahydrate)
Solubility in water	soluble
- Except where otherwise noted, data are given for materials in their standard state (at 25 °C [77 °F], 100 kPa). Infobox references

Iron(II) selenate (ferrous selenate) is an inorganic compound with the formula FeSeO_{4}. It has anhydrous and several hydrate forms. The pentahydrate has the structure, [Fe(H_{2}O)_{4}]SeO_{4}•H_{2}O, isomorphous to the corresponding iron(II) sulfate. Heptahydrate is also known, in form of unstable green crystalline solid.

== Preparation ==
Iron(II) selenate can be prepared by the reaction of saturated sodium selenate and iron(II) sulfate at 80 °C. When cooled to room temperature, crystalline iron(II) selenate precipitates from the solution.

Na_{2}SeO_{4} (sat.) + FeSO_{4} → Na_{2}SO_{4} + FeSeO_{4}

The reaction of iron and selenic acid produces iron(II) selenate as well, but with a side product:

Fe + H_{2}SeO_{4} → FeSeO_{4} + H_{2}↑
3 Fe + 4 H_{2}SeO_{4} → 3 FeSeO_{4} + Se + 4 H_{2}O

== Other species containing oxoanion of selenium ==
Double salts like the Tutton's salts (NH_{4})_{2}Fe(SeO_{4})_{2}•6H_{2}O and K_{2}Fe(SeO_{4})_{2}•6H_{2}O are known.

In addition to the ferrous (Fe^{2+}) salt, the ferric (Fe^{3+}) salt iron(III) selenate, Fe_{2}(SeO_{4})_{3}, has also been reported.

However, iron(II) selenite (FeSeO_{3}) is unknown, though the selenite and pyroselenite of iron(III) was published.
