= Calcium selenate =

Identifiers
CAS Number	14019-91-1; 7790-74-1 dihydrate

Properties
Chemical formula	CaSeO_{4}
Molar mass	183.04 g/mol
Appearance	Colorless crystalline solid
Solubility in water	Soluble in water
- Except where otherwise noted, data are given for materials in their standard state (at 25 °C [77 °F], 100 kPa). Infobox references

Calcium selenate is an inorganic compound of calcium and the selenate ion, with the chemical formula CaSeO_{4}. It forms several crystalline polymorphs and hydrated phases. The dihydrate, CaSeO_{4}·2H_{2}O, is isomorphous with gypsum, CaSO_{4}·2H_{2}O.

== Preparation ==
Calcium selenate dihydrate can be precipitated from aqueous solutions of a soluble calcium salt and a soluble selenate, for example from calcium chloride and sodium selenate:

CaCl_{2} + Na_{2}SeO_{4} + 2 H_{2}O → CaSeO_{4}·2H_{2}O + 2 NaCl

Anhydrous calcium selenate polymorphs can be prepared by dehydration or by hydrothermal crystallization under controlled conditions. Orthorhombic and monoclinic CaSeO_{4} have been crystallized at about 210 °C, whereas the tetragonal modification has been obtained at approximately 70 °C.

== Properties ==
=== Structure ===
Three polymorphs of anhydrous CaSeO_{4} have been structurally characterized.

The orthorhombic modification crystallizes in space group Cmca (No. 64), with lattice parameters a = 7.192 Å, b = 14.404 Å and c = 6.398 Å, and eight formula units per unit cell. It represents a distinct structure type with structural similarities to both anhydrite and zircon.

The monoclinic modification crystallizes in space group P2_{1}/n (No. 14), with a = 6.860 Å, b = 7.086 Å, c = 6.692 Å and β = 104.21°, with Z = 4. It is isotypic with the monazite structure.

The tetragonal modification crystallizes in space group I4_{1}/a (No. 88), with a = 5.054 Å and c = 11.678 Å, and has the scheelite structure type.

In all three polymorphs, selenium occurs in SeO_{4}^{2−} tetrahedra, while calcium is eight-coordinate.

=== Hydrates ===
Calcium selenate forms several hydrates, of which the dihydrate is the best characterized.

CaSeO_{4}·2H_{2}O is monoclinic and isomorphous with gypsum. Because sulfate and selenate ions have similar size and geometry, CaSO_{4}·2H_{2}O and CaSeO_{4}·2H_{2}O can form solid solutions, although a substantial miscibility gap exists at room temperature.

The solubility of the dihydrate decreases with increasing temperature. A critical review of thermodynamic data selected a solubility of

0.380 ± 0.025 mol CaSeO_{4} kg^{−1} H_{2}O

at 298.15 K.

Partial dehydration produces calcium selenate subhydrates. A phase nominally described in older literature as CaSeO_{4}·0.5H_{2}O was subsequently reinvestigated by single-crystal and synchrotron X-ray diffraction. Material produced hydrothermally from the dihydrate at 463 K was found to have the composition CaSeO_{4}·0.625H_{2}O.

This subhydrate crystallizes in the trigonal space group P3_{2}21. Its structure is related to that of bassanite, with water molecules occupying channels in the calcium–selenate framework.

=== Thermal behaviour ===
On heating, calcium selenate dihydrate loses water and forms lower hydrates or anhydrous CaSeO_{4}. The dehydration behaviour is closely analogous to that of calcium sulfate, although differences in phase stability arise from the larger SeO_{4}^{2−} ion.

The thermal decomposition of calcium selenate at higher temperatures has been studied by thermogravimetric and differential thermal analysis.
