= Lanthanum arsenate =

Names
- Other names Lanthanum(III) arsenate

Identifiers
CAS Number	14214-04-1
3D model (JSmol)	Interactive image
ChemSpider	11184034
PubChem CID	22138168
- InChI: InChI=1S/AsH3O4.La/c2-1(3,4)5;/h(H3,2,3,4,5);/q;+3/p-3 Key: NMUNWFJEAQAMBX-UHFFFAOYSA-K
- SMILES: [O-][As](=O)([O-])[O-].[La+3]

Properties
Chemical formula	LaAsO_{4}
Molar mass	277.83 g/mol
Appearance	White powder or colorless crystals
Density	5.57 g/cm^{3} (calculated)
Solubility in water	Sparingly soluble in water

Structure
Crystal structure	Monoclinic, monazite type
Space group	P2_{1}/n, No. 14
Lattice constant	a = 0.67615 nm, b = 0.72103 nm, c = 0.70056 nm α = 90°, β = 104.507°, γ = 90°
Formula units (Z)	4
- Except where otherwise noted, data are given for materials in their standard state (at 25 °C [77 °F], 100 kPa). Infobox references

Lanthanum arsenate is an inorganic compound of lanthanum and the arsenate ion, with the chemical formula LaAsO_{4}. It is a sparingly soluble crystalline solid and adopts the monoclinic monazite structure type. The ideal composition LaAsO_{4} also occurs naturally as the rare mineral gasparite-(La).

== Preparation ==
Lanthanum arsenate can be prepared hydrothermally from lanthanum nitrate and arsenic acid. A modern synthesis used equimolar 0.3 M solutions of La(III) and As(V), reacted at 160 °C for 24 hours:

La(NO_{3})_{3} + H_{3}AsO_{4} → LaAsO_{4} + 3 HNO_{3}

Single crystals have also been obtained from alkali- and rare-earth-metal chloride fluxes. In one synthesis, unintended ingress of air oxidized arsenic to As(V), giving colorless LaAsO_{4} crystals as a by-product.

== Properties ==
=== Crystal structure ===
Lanthanum arsenate crystallizes in the monoclinic crystal system, space group P2_{1}/n (No. 14), with the monazite structure type.

Single-crystal diffraction gives the lattice parameters a = 6.7615 Å, b = 7.2103 Å, c = 7.0056 Å, β = 104.507° with four formula units per unit cell.

The structure contains isolated AsO^{3−}_{4} tetrahedra and irregular La–O coordination polyhedra. Nine oxygen atoms from seven arsenate tetrahedra lie in the primary coordination sphere of La^{3+}, with a more distant tenth oxygen contact also sometimes included.

As–O bond lengths lie at about 1.67–1.69 Å, while the La–O distances in the principal coordination sphere are approximately 2.48–2.91 Å.

LaAsO_{4} represents the large-cation, monazite-type end of the rare-earth arsenate structural series; the smaller rare-earth arsenates instead adopt the tetragonal xenotime structure.

=== Solubility and stability ===
Lanthanum arsenate is only slightly soluble in water and is particularly stable under mildly acidic to neutral conditions.

Hydrothermally synthesized LaAsO_{4} released less than 1 mg/L arsenic during a 24-hour leaching test at pH 5. Longer equilibrium experiments at 22 °C gave dissolved arsenic concentrations of about 4 mg/L at pH 5 and 13 mg/L at pH 7.

The dissolution was found to be incongruent, rather than a simple stoichiometric dissolution of LaAsO_{4}.

=== Natural occurrence ===
The ideal composition LaAsO_{4} occurs naturally as gasparite-(La), a member of the monazite group approved as a mineral species in 2018.

Gasparite-(La) is monoclinic, space group P2_{1}/n, and is structurally equivalent to synthetic LaAsO_{4}. Natural samples are not compositionally pure: La is partly replaced by Ce, Nd and other cations, while As may be partly replaced by P or V.

=== Arsenic immobilization ===
The low solubility of LaAsO_{4} has led to investigation of lanthanum compounds for removing arsenate from contaminated water. Lanthanum hydroxide, carbonate and related materials can remove dissolved As(V), with formation of poorly soluble lanthanum arsenate contributing under acidic conditions.

Precipitation-based processes using lanthanum chloride have also been studied over approximately pH 3–10 for arsenic stabilization.
