= Ammonium cerium(IV) sulfate =

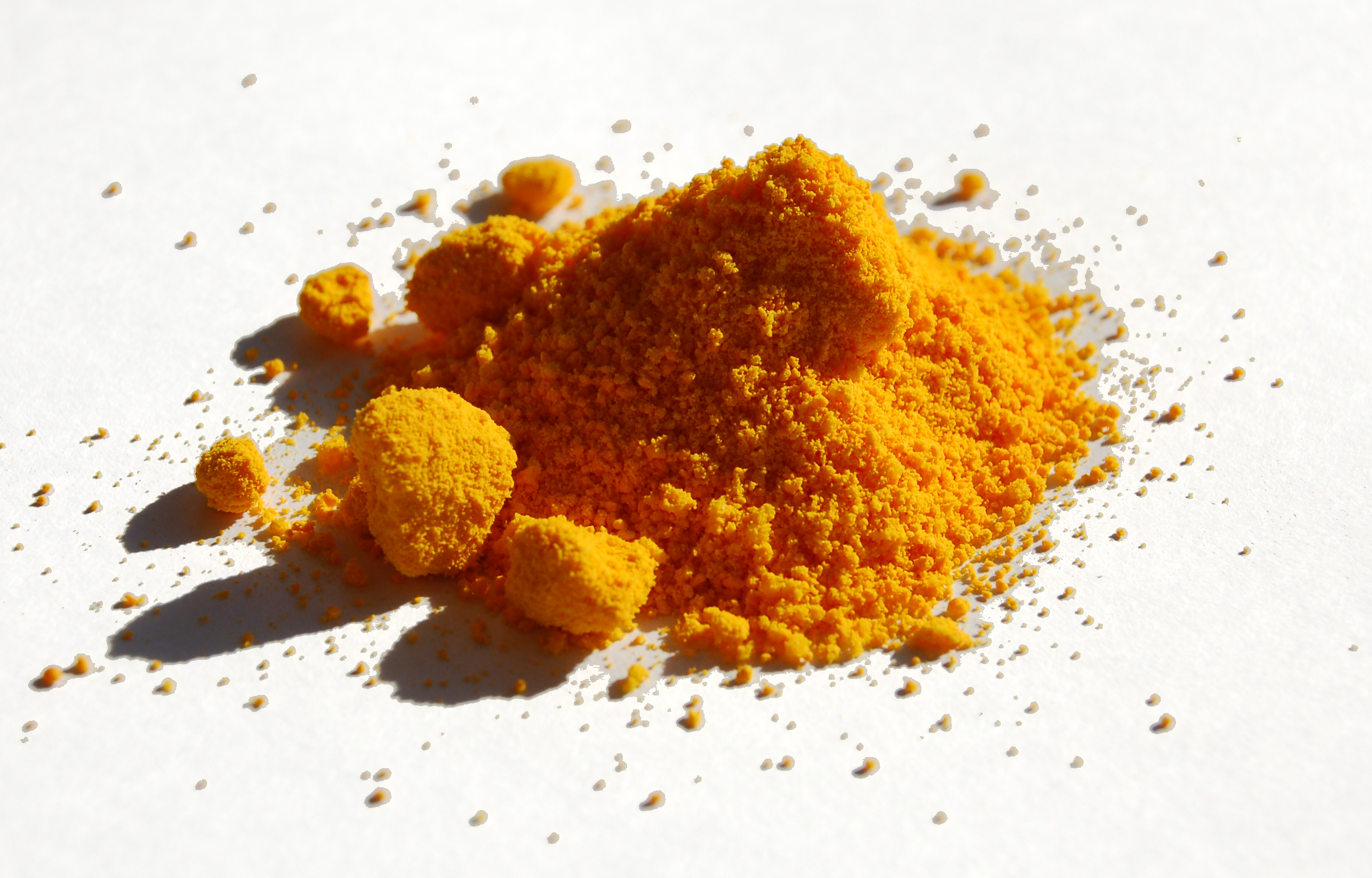

Names
- Other names Cerium(IV) ammonium sulfate

Identifiers
CAS Number	10378-47-9
3D model (JSmol)	Interactive image
ChemSpider	17339565
ECHA InfoCard	100.206.470
EC Number	681-318-2
PubChem CID	71308344
CompTox Dashboard (EPA)	DTXSID30897728
- InChI: InChI=1S/Ce.4H3N.4H2O4S.2H2O/c;;;;;4*1-5(2,3)4;;/h;4*1H3;4*(H2,1,2,3,4);2*1H2/q+4;;;;;;;;;;/p-4 Key: VCNAMBGKEDPVGQ-UHFFFAOYSA-J
- SMILES: [Ce+4].[O-]S(=O)(=O)[O-].[O-]S([O-])(=O)=O.[O-]S([O-])(=O)=O.[O-]S([O-])(=O)=O.O.O.[NH4+].[NH4+].[NH4+].[NH4+]

Properties
Chemical formula	H_{20}N_{4}S_{4}O_{18}Ce
Molar mass	632.55 g/mol
Appearance	Orange-colored solid
Melting point	130 °C (266 °F; 403 K)
Solubility in water	soluble in water

Hazards
- Occupational safety and health (OHS/OSH)
Main hazards	Irritant
- GHS labelling
Pictograms	(GHS07: Exclamation mark)
Signal word	Warning
Hazard statements	H315, H319, H335
Precautionary statements	P261, P262, P264, P280, P302+P352, P305+P351+P338, P314, P332+P313, P337+P313, P362
NFPA 704 (fire diamond)	2 1 OX

Related compounds
Related compounds	Cerium(IV) sulfate, Ceric ammonium nitrate
- Except where otherwise noted, data are given for materials in their standard state (at 25 °C [77 °F], 100 kPa). verify (what is ?) Infobox references

Ammonium cerium(IV) sulfate is an inorganic compound with the formula (NH_{4})_{4}Ce(SO_{4})_{4}·2H_{2}O. It is an orange-colored solid. It is a strong oxidant, the potential for reduction is about +1.44V. Cerium(IV) sulfate is a related compound.

== Structure ==
A crystallographic study shows that the compound contains the Ce_{2}(SO_{4})_{8}^{8−} anion, where the cerium atoms are 9 coordinated by oxygen atoms belonging to sulfate groups, in a distorted tricapped trigonal prism. The compound is thus sometimes formulated as (NH_{4})_{8}[Ce_{2}(SO_{4})_{8}]·4H_{2}O.

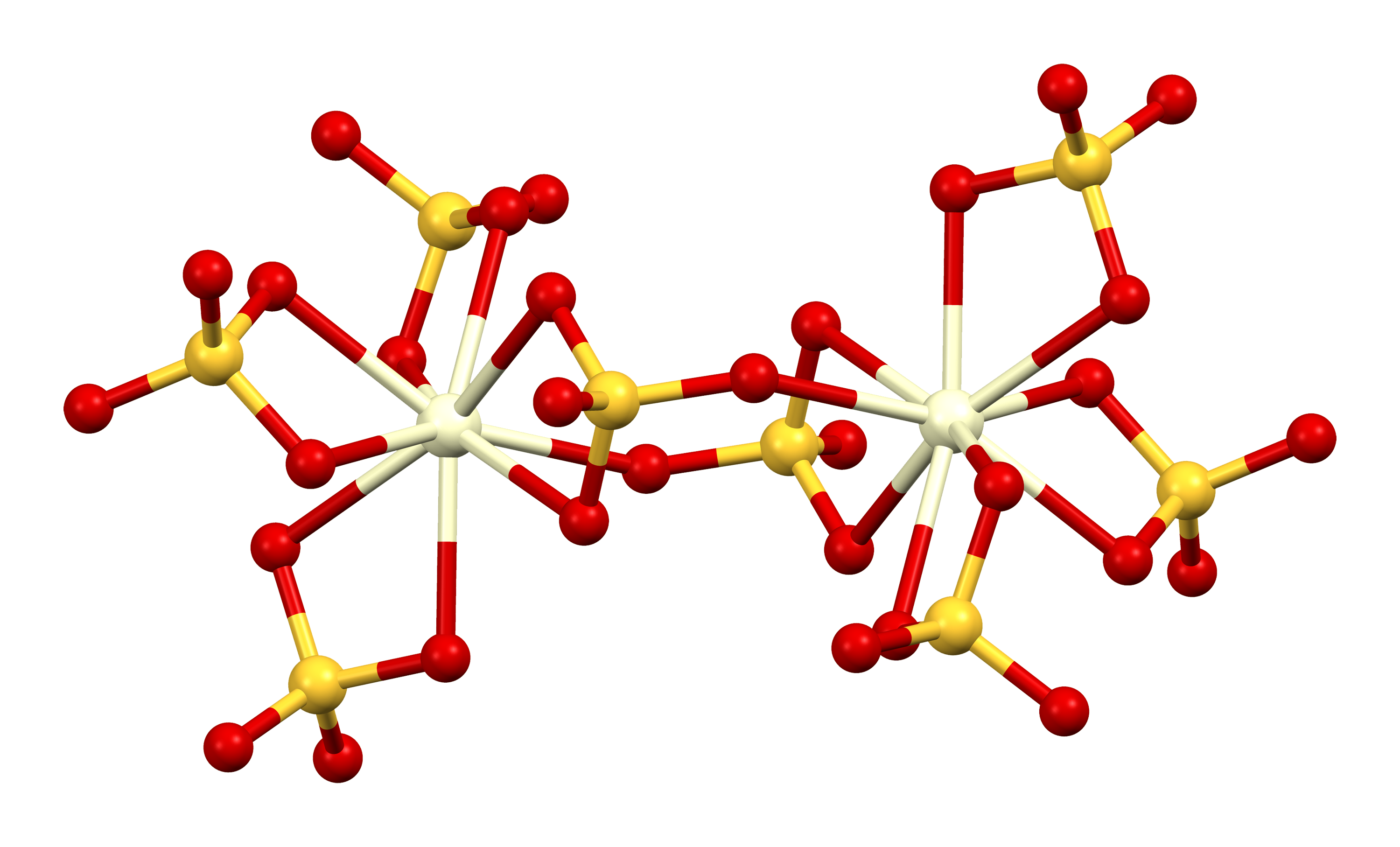
