= Selenoyl fluoride =

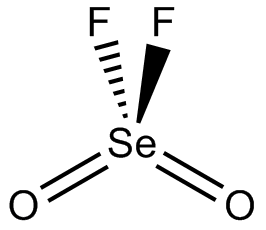

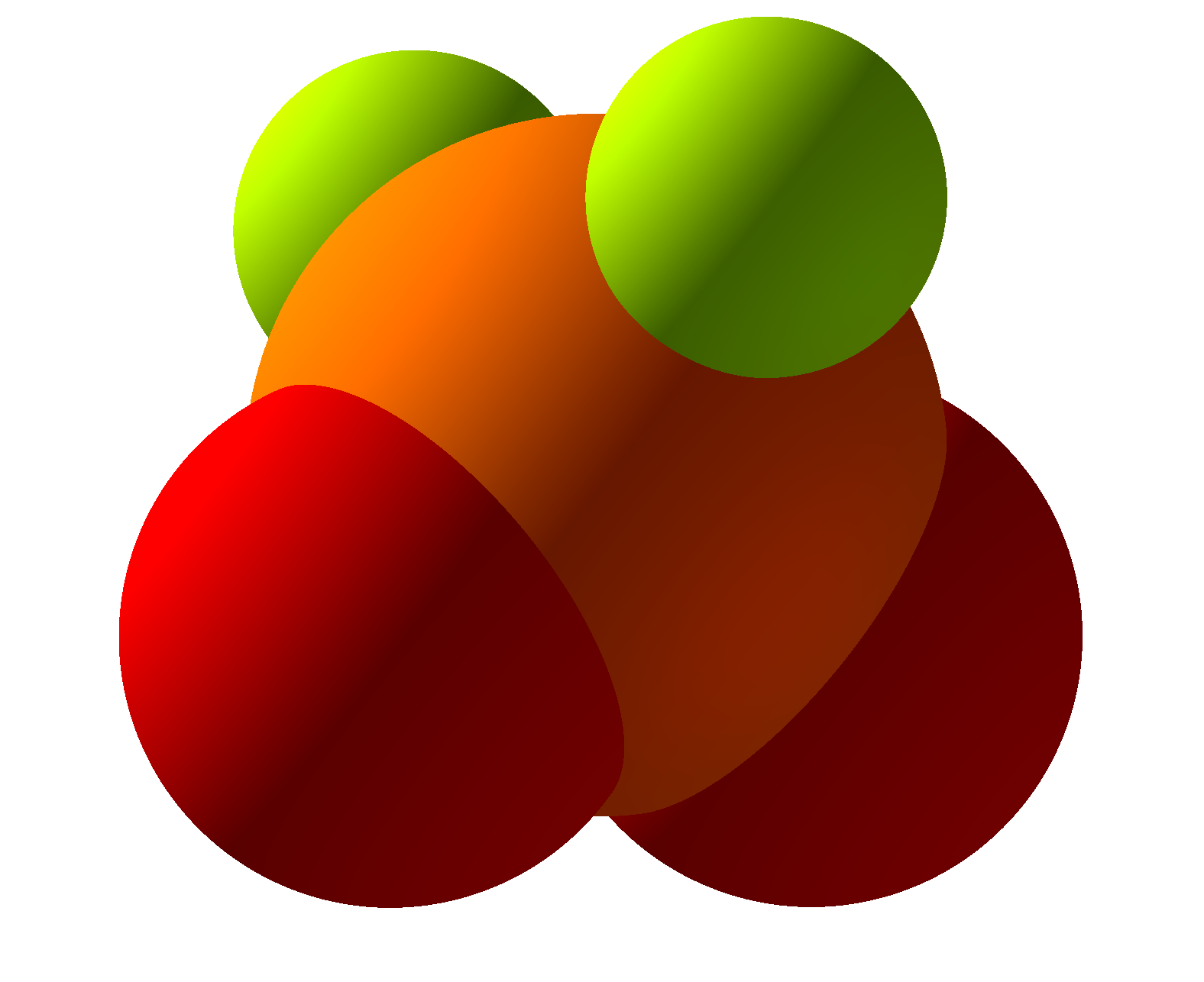

Names
- Other names selenoyl difluoride, selenium oxyfluoride, or selenium dioxydifluoride

Identifiers
CAS Number	14984-81-7
3D model (JSmol)	Interactive image
ChemSpider	10329076
PubChem CID	23236013
CompTox Dashboard (EPA)	DTXSID10631420
- InChI: InChI=1S/F2O2Se/c1-5(2,3)4 Key: VCPFQVXWYPMUKZ-UHFFFAOYSA-N; InChI=1/F2O2Se/c1-5(2,3)4 Key: VCPFQVXWYPMUKZ-UHFFFAOYAS
- SMILES: O=[Se](=O)(F)F

Properties
Chemical formula	SeO_{2}F_{2}
Molar mass	148.95 g/mol
Appearance	colorless gas
Melting point	−99.5 °C (−147.1 °F; 173.7 K)
Boiling point	−8.4 °C (16.9 °F; 264.8 K)

Related compounds
Other cations	SO_{2}F_{2}
Related compounds	SeF_{6}, SeO_{3}
- Except where otherwise noted, data are given for materials in their standard state (at 25 °C [77 °F], 100 kPa). verify (what is ?) Infobox references

Selenoyl fluoride is the inorganic compound with the formula SeO_{2}F_{2}. It is a colorless, corrosive gas.

== Structure ==
The molecule has a distorted tetrahedral shape with the following bond angles: O-Se-O = 126.2°, O-Se-F = 108.0°. and F-Se-F = 94.1°. The Se-F bond length is 1.685 Å and the selenium to oxygen distancesare 1.575 Å.

== Formation ==
Selenoyl fluoride can be produced by the action of warm fluorosulfonic acid on selenic acid:

HSO_{3}F + H_{2}SeO_{4} → H_{2}O + SeO_{2}F_{2} + H_{2}SO_{4}

Barium selenate can be used in place of the selenic acid. Treatment of SeO_{3} with SeF_{4} give this gas along with other oxyfluorides.

== Reactions ==
Selenoyl fluoride is more reactive than its lighter homologue sulfuryl fluoride. It hydrolyzes more easily. It is a strong oxidant. It reacts violently with ammonia, for example. It attacks glass.

Selenoyl fluoride reacte with xenon difluoride to give FXeOSeF_{5}.
