= Barium selenate =

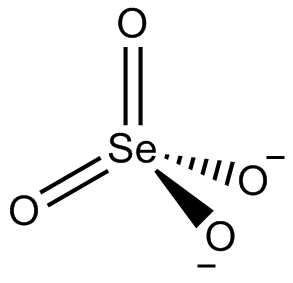

Identifiers
CAS Number	7787-41-9
3D model (JSmol)	Interactive image
ChemSpider	118681
ECHA InfoCard	100.029.194
EC Number	232-113-8
PubChem CID	134655
UNII	XEW84XNI9U
UN number	2630
CompTox Dashboard (EPA)	DTXSID90884432
- InChI: InChI=1S/Ba.H2O4Se/c;1-5(2,3)4/h;(H2,1,2,3,4)/q+2;/p-2 Key: ZIGAPMSTBOKWRT-UHFFFAOYSA-L
- SMILES: [O-][Se](=O)(=O)[O-].[Ba+2]

Properties
Chemical formula	BaSeO_{4}
Molar mass	280.29
Appearance	colourless crystals
Solubility in water	0.0118 g (20 °C); 0.0138 g (100 °C)

Hazards
- GHS labelling
Pictograms	(GHS06: Toxic) (GHS08: Health hazard) (GHS09: Environmental hazard)
Signal word	Danger
Hazard statements	H301, H331, H373, H410
Precautionary statements	P260, P264, P270, P271, P273, P301+P316, P304+P340, P316, P319, P321, P330, P391, P403+P233, P405, P501

Related compounds
Other anions	barium sulfate
Other cations	magnesium selenate calcium selenate strontium selenate
- Except where otherwise noted, data are given for materials in their standard state (at 25 °C [77 °F], 100 kPa). Infobox references

Barium selenate is an inorganic compound with the chemical formula BaSeO_{4}. It is isomorphous with barium sulfate, but its solubility is 18 times that of barium sulfate, and its thermal stability is worse than that of barium sulfate.

== Preparation ==
Barium selenate can be obtained from the reaction of any soluble barium salt and sodium selenate:

BaCl_{2} + Na_{2}SeO_{4} → BaSeO_{4}↓ + 2 NaCl

== Properties ==
Barium selenate is a white solid that is slightly soluble in water. When heated above 425 °C, the compound decomposes. Another barium selenate, barium diselenate, BaSe_{2}O_{7}, is also known. It has an orthorhombic baryte-type crystal structure with the space group Pnma (space group no. 62) (a = 8.993 Å, b = 5.675 Å, c = 7.349 Å).

== Uses ==
Barium selenate has been used as a "slow release" source of selenium for grazing animal feed crops and was intended to ensure selenium supply to grazing animals. In Switzerland and the EU, direct use as a feed additive is prohibited. Barium selenide can be obtained by reducing barium selenate in a hydrogen stream:

BaSeO_{4} + 4 H_{2} → BaSe + 4 H_{2}O
