= Cerium(III) selenate =

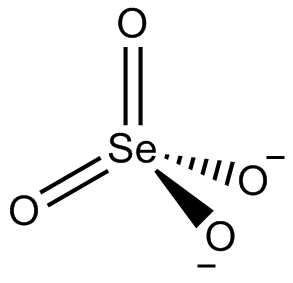

Identifiers
CAS Number	anhydrous: 13454-73-4; pentahydrate: 23653-34-1
3D model (JSmol)	anhydrous: Interactive image; pentahydrate: Interactive image
PubChem CID	anhydrous: 20432114
- InChI: InChI=1S/2Ce.3H2O4Se/c;;3*1-5(2,3)4/h;;3*(H2,1,2,3,4)/q2*+3;;;/p-6 Key: IRJPWWVGQHXWSR-UHFFFAOYSA-H
- SMILES: anhydrous: [O-][Se](=O)(=O)[O-].[O-][Se](=O)(=O)[O-].[O-][Se](=O)(=O)[O-].[Ce+3].[Ce+3]; pentahydrate: [O-][Se](=O)(=O)[O-].[O-][Se](=O)(=O)[O-].[O-][Se](=O)(=O)[O-].[Ce+3].[Ce+3].O.O.O.O.O

Properties
Chemical formula	Ce_{2}(SeO_{4})_{3}
Molar mass	709.121
Density	4.456g/cm^{3} (octahydrate)
Solubility in water	39.5g(0 °C); 2.51(100 °C)

Related compounds
Other anions	cerium(III) sulfate
- Except where otherwise noted, data are given for materials in their standard state (at 25 °C [77 °F], 100 kPa). Infobox references

Cerium(III) selenate is an inorganic compound with the chemical formula Ce_{2}(SeO_{4})_{3}. It can be obtained by reacting selenic acid and cerium(III) carbonate, and the solvent is evaporated to precipitate crystals. The double salt CsCe(SeO_{4})_{2}·4H_{2}O can be obtained from mixing cerium(III) selenate and cesium selenate in an aqueous solution, and then evaporating and crystallizing the solution.
