= Cerium(IV) sulfate =

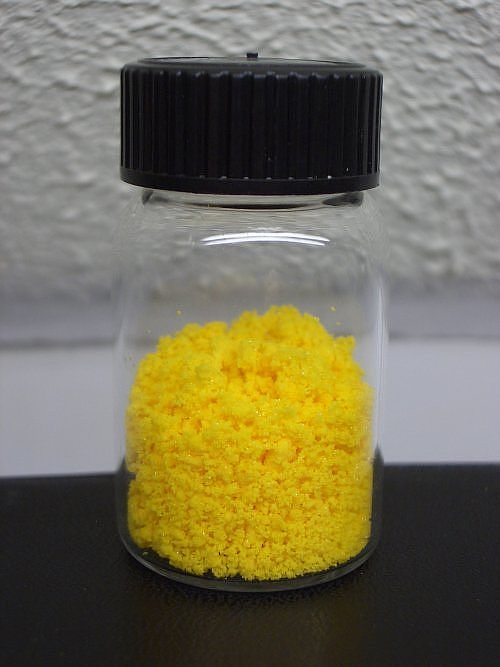
- Cerium(IV) sulfate

Names
- Other names Ceric sulfate

Identifiers
CAS Number	13590-82-4; 10294-42-5 (tetrahydrate)
3D model (JSmol)	Interactive image
ChemSpider	140403
ECHA InfoCard	100.033.648
PubChem CID	159684
UNII	4F66FI5T7X; 6SAX34B8JE (tetrahydrate)
CompTox Dashboard (EPA)	DTXSID60890707
- InChI: InChI=1S/Ce.2H2O4S/c;2*1-5(2,3)4/h;2*(H2,1,2,3,4)/q+4;;/p-4 Key: VZDYWEUILIUIDF-UHFFFAOYSA-J; InChI=1/Ce.2H2O4S/c;2*1-5(2,3)4/h;2*(H2,1,2,3,4)/q+4;;/p-4 Key: VZDYWEUILIUIDF-XBHQNQODAK
- SMILES: [Ce+4].[O-]S(=O)(=O)[O-].[O-]S([O-])(=O)=O

Properties
Chemical formula	Ce(SO_{4})_{2}
Molar mass	332.24 g/mol (anhydrous); 404.304 (tetrahydrate)
Appearance	Yellow solid (anhydrous) yellow-orange crystals (tetrahydrate)
Density	3.91 g/cm^{3} (tetrahydrate)
Melting point	350 °C (662 °F; 623 K) (decomposes)
Boiling point	N/A
Solubility in water	Soluble in small amounts, hydrolyzes in large amounts of water 21.4 g/100 mL (0 °C); 9.84 g/100 mL (20 °C); 3.87 g/100 mL (60 °C)
Solubility	soluble in dilute sulfuric acid
Magnetic susceptibility (χ)	+37.0·10^{−6} cm^{3}/mol

Structure
Crystal structure	orthorhombic

Hazards
- Occupational safety and health (OHS/OSH)
Main hazards	Oxidizer
Safety data sheet (SDS)	External MSDS
- Except where otherwise noted, data are given for materials in their standard state (at 25 °C [77 °F], 100 kPa). verify (what is ?) Infobox references

Cerium(IV) sulfate, also called ceric sulfate, is an inorganic compound. It exists as the anhydrous salt Ce(SO_{4})_{2} as well as a few hydrated forms: Ce(SO_{4})_{2}(H_{2}O)_{x}, with x equal to 4, 8, or 12. These salts are yellow to yellow/orange solids that are moderately soluble in water and dilute acids. Its neutral solutions slowly decompose, depositing the light yellow oxide CeO_{2}. Solutions of ceric sulfate have a strong yellow color. The tetrahydrate loses water when heated to 180-200 °C.

It is insoluble in glacial acetic acid and pure (96%) ethanol.

It was historically produced by direct reaction of fine, calcined cerium(IV) oxide and concentrated sulfuric acid, yielding the tetrahydrate.

== Uses ==
The ceric ion is a strong oxidizer, especially under acidic conditions. If ceric sulfate is added to dilute hydrochloric acid, then elemental chlorine is formed, albeit slowly. With stronger reducing agents it reacts much faster. For example, with sulfite in acidic environments it reacts quickly and completely.

When ceric compounds are reduced, so-called cerous compounds are formed. The reaction taking place is:

Ce^{4+} + e^{−} → Ce^{3+}

The cerous ion is colorless.

Ceric sulfate is used in analytical chemistry for redox titration, often together with a redox indicator.

A related compound is ceric ammonium sulfate.

The solubility of Ce(IV) in methanesulfonic acid is approximately 10 times the value obtainable in acidic sulfate solutions.

== See also ==
- Cerium(III) sulfate
