= Lanthanum(III) nitrate =

Chemical compound

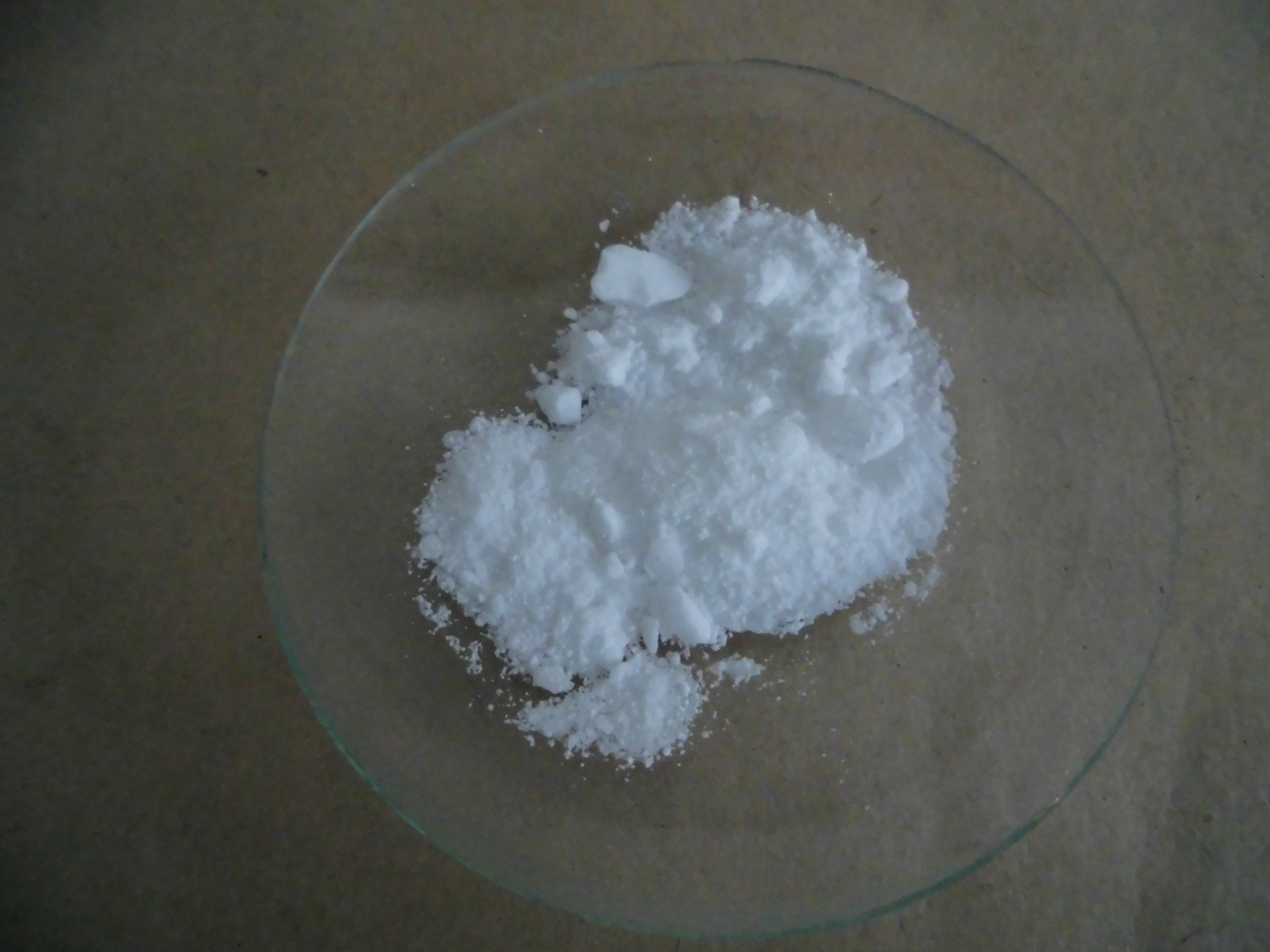

Names
- Other names: Lanthanum trinitrate

Identifiers
CAS Number	10099-59-9
3D model (JSmol)	Interactive image
ChemSpider	23467
ECHA InfoCard	100.030.203
EC Number	233-238-0
PubChem CID	24918
UNII	33A856C3T7
CompTox Dashboard (EPA)	DTXSID90890639
- InChI: InChI=1S/La.3HNO3/c;3*2-1(3)4/h;3*(H,2,3,4)/q+3;;; Key: PAPXNISCLWTJQS-UHFFFAOYSA-N
- SMILES: [N+](=O)(O)[O-].[N+](=O)(O)[O-].[N+](=O)(O)[O-].[La+3]

Properties
Chemical formula	La(NO_{3})_{3}
Molar mass	324.92 g/mol
Appearance	Colorless crystals
Odor	slight odor
Density	1.3 g/cm^{3}
Melting point	40 °C (104 °F; 313 K)
Boiling point	126 °C (259 °F; 399 K) decomposes
Solubility in water	158 g/100 mL
Solubility	Soluble in acetone and ethanol

Hazards
- GHS labelling
Pictograms	(GHS03: Oxidizing) (GHS05: Corrosive) (GHS09: Environmental hazard)
Signal word	Danger
Hazard statements	H272, H315, H319, H335
Precautionary statements	P210, P273, P280, P305+P351+P338+P310, P405, P501
NFPA 704 (fire diamond)	1 2 2
- Lethal dose or concentration (LD, LC)
LD_{50} (median dose)	4500 mg/kg (oral, rat)

Related compounds
Other anions	Lanthanum(III) sulfate
Other cations	Cerium(III) nitrate
- Except where otherwise noted, data are given for materials in their standard state (at 25 °C [77 °F], 100 kPa). Infobox references

Lanthanum(III) nitrate is any inorganic compound with the chemical formula La(NO_{3})_{3}·xH_{2}O. It is used in the extraction and purification of lanthanum from its ores.

The compound decomposes at 499°C to lanthanum oxide, nitric oxide and oxygen.

== Preparation ==
Lanthanum nitrate is prepared by reacting lanthanum oxide with nitric acid which creates lanthanum(III) nitrate and water.

La_{2}O_{3} + 6 HNO_{3} → 2 La(NO_{3})_{3} + 3 H_{2}O
