= Selenium oxide =

Selenium oxide may refer to either of the following compounds:

- Selenium dioxide, SeO_{2}
- Diselenium pentoxide, Se_{2}O_{5}
- Selenium trioxide, SeO_{3}
