= Selenium trioxide =

Structural formula of the monomer as found in the gas phase
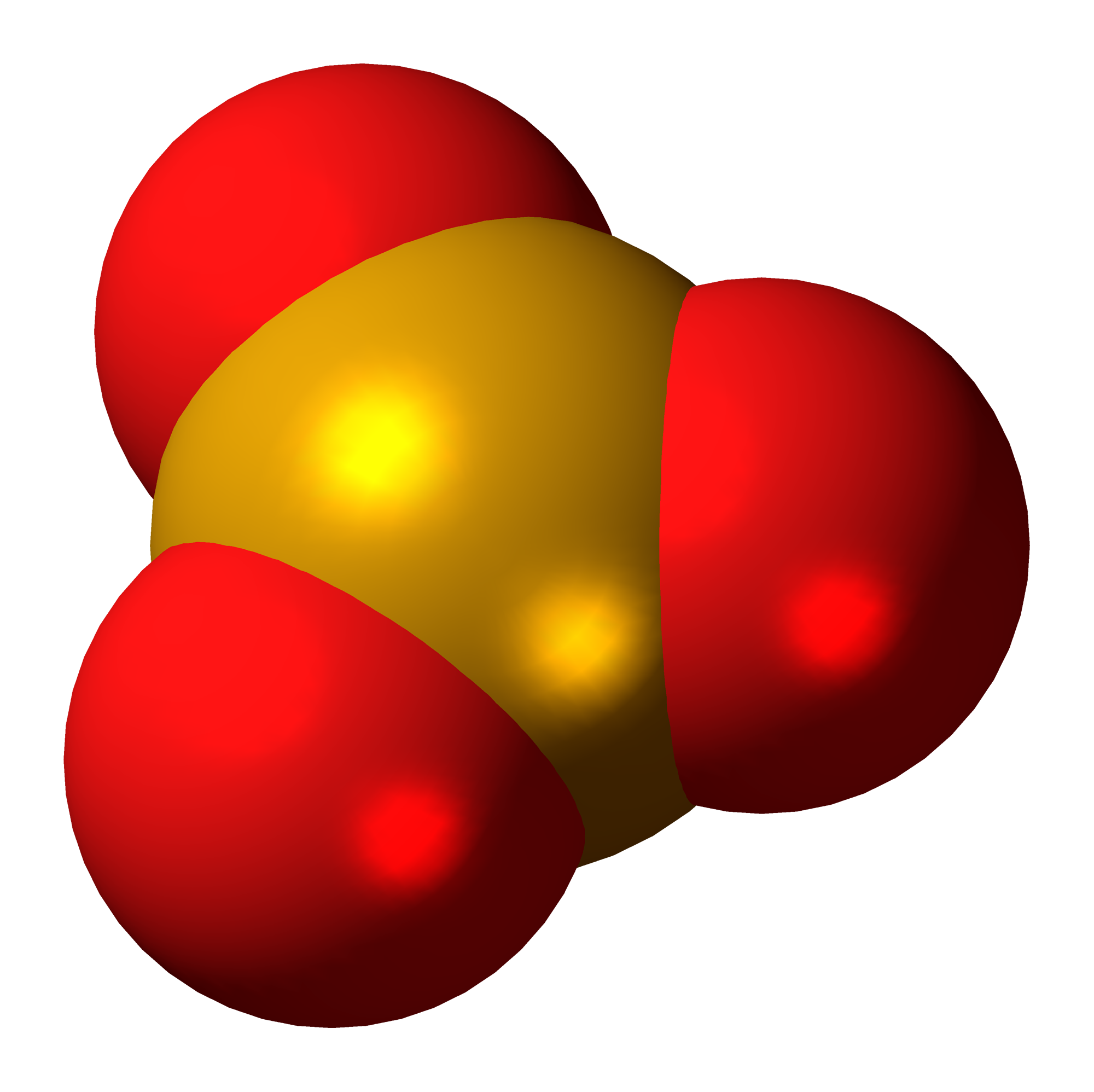
Space-filling model of the monomer as found in the gas phase

Identifiers
CAS Number	13768-86-0
3D model (JSmol)	monomer: Interactive image; cyclic tetramer: Interactive image
ChemSpider	103019
ECHA InfoCard	100.033.972
PubChem CID	115128
CompTox Dashboard (EPA)	DTXSID50895004
- InChI: InChI=1S/O3Se/c1-4(2)3 Key: VFLXBUJKRRJAKY-UHFFFAOYSA-N; InChI=1/O3Se/c1-4(2)3 Key: VFLXBUJKRRJAKY-UHFFFAOYAC
- SMILES: monomer: O=[Se](=O)=O; cyclic tetramer: O=[Se]0(=O)O[Se](=O)(=O)O[Se](=O)(=O)O[Se](=O)(=O)O0

Properties
Chemical formula	SeO_{3}
Molar mass	126.96 g/mol
Appearance	white hygroscopic crystals
Density	3.44 g/cm^{3}
Melting point	118.35 °C (245.03 °F; 391.50 K)
Boiling point	sublimes
Solubility in water	very soluble

Structure
Crystal structure	tetragonal

Hazards
- GHS labelling
Pictograms	(GHS06: Toxic) (GHS09: Environmental hazard)
Signal word	Danger
Hazard statements	H301, H331, H373, H410
NFPA 704 (fire diamond)	4 0 2 OX
- Lethal dose or concentration (LD, LC)
LD_{50} (median dose)	7 mg/kg (rat, oral); 7.08 mg/kg (mouse, oral); 5.06 mg/kg (guinea pig, oral); 2.25 mg/kg (rabbit, oral); 13 mg/kg (horse, oral)
LC_{50} (median concentration)	13 mg/kg (pig, oral); 9.9 mg/kg (cow, oral); 3.3 mg/kg (goat, oral); 3.3 mg/kg (sheep, oral)
- Except where otherwise noted, data are given for materials in their standard state (at 25 °C [77 °F], 100 kPa). verify (what is ?) Infobox references

Selenium trioxide is the inorganic compound with the formula SeO_{3}. It is white, hygroscopic solid. It is also an oxidizing agent and a Lewis acid. It is of academic interest as a precursor to Se(VI) compounds.

== Preparation ==
Selenium trioxide is difficult to prepare because it is unstable with respect to the dioxide:

2 SeO_{3} → 2 SeO_{2} + O_{2}

It has been generated in a number of ways despite the fact that the dioxide does not combust under normal conditions. One method entails dehydration of anhydrous selenic acid with phosphorus pentoxide at 150–160 °C. Another method is the reaction of liquid sulfur trioxide with potassium selenate.

SO_{3} + K_{2}SeO_{4} → K_{2}SO_{4} + SeO_{3}

== Reactions ==
In its chemistry SeO_{3} generally resembles sulfur trioxide, SO_{3}, rather than tellurium trioxide, TeO_{3}. The impure substance reacts explosively with oxidizable organic compounds.

At 120 °C SeO_{3} reacts with selenium dioxide to form the Se(VI)-Se(IV) compound diselenium pentaoxide:

SeO_{3} + SeO_{2} → Se_{2}O_{5}

It reacts with selenium tetrafluoride to form selenoyl fluoride, the selenium analogue of sulfuryl fluoride

2SeO_{3} + SeF_{4} → 2SeO_{2}F_{2} + SeO_{2}

As with SO_{3} adducts are formed with Lewis bases such as pyridine, dioxane and ether.

With lithium oxide and sodium oxide it reacts to form salts of Se^{VI}O_{5}^{4−} and Se^{VI}O_{6}^{6−}: With Li_{2}O, it gives Li_{4}SeO_{5}, containing the trigonal pyramidal anion Se^{VI}O_{5}^{4−} with equatorial bonds, 170.6–171.9 pm; and longer axial Se−O bonds of 179.5 pm. With Na_{2}O it gives Na_{4}SeO_{5}, containing the square pyramidal Se^{VI}O_{5}^{4−}, with Se−O bond lengths ranging from range 172.9 → 181.5 pm, and Na_{12}(SeO_{4})_{3}(SeO_{6}), containing octahedral Se^{VI}O_{6}^{6−}. Se^{VI}O_{6}^{6−} is the conjugate base of the unknown orthoselenic acid (Se(OH)_{6}).

== Structure ==
In the solid phase SeO_{3} consists of cyclic tetramers, with an 8 membered (Se−O)_{4} ring. Selenium atoms are 4-coordinate, bond lengths being Se−O bridging are 175 pm and 181 pm, non-bridging 156 and 154 pm.

SeO_{3} in the gas phase consists of tetramers and monomeric SeO_{3} which is trigonal planar with an Se−O bond length of 168.78 pm.
