= Sodium selenate =

Names
- IUPAC name Sodium selenate

Identifiers
CAS Number	10102-23-5
3D model (JSmol)	Interactive image
ChEBI	CHEBI:77775
ChEMBL	ChEMBL114503
ChemSpider	24185
DrugBank	DBSALT002579
ECHA InfoCard	100.033.169
EC Number	236-501-8
PubChem CID	25960
RTECS number	VS6650000
UNII	decahydrate: 0CJN4029EB
UN number	2630
CompTox Dashboard (EPA)	DTXSID5032076
- InChI: InChI=1S/2Na.H2O4Se/c;;1-5(2,3)4/h;;(H2,1,2,3,4)/q2*+1;/p-2 Key: MHQOTKLEMKRJIR-UHFFFAOYSA-L; InChI=1S/2Na.H2O4Se/c;;1-5(2,3)4/h;;(H2,1,2,3,4)/q2*+1;/p-2
- SMILES: [O-][Se](=O)(=O)[O-].[Na+].[Na+]

Properties
Chemical formula	Na_{2}O_{4}Se
Molar mass	188.947 g·mol^{−1}
Appearance	White or grey powder
Density	3.098 g/cm^{3}
Solubility in water	soluble

Pharmacology
ATC code	A12CE01 (WHO)

Hazards
- GHS labelling
Pictograms	(GHS06: Toxic) (GHS08: Health hazard) (GHS09: Environmental hazard)
Signal word	Danger
Hazard statements	H301, H331, H373, H410
NFPA 704 (fire diamond)	4 0 0
Flash point	Non-flammable

Related compounds
Other anions	Sodium sulfate
Other cations	Potassium selenate
- Except where otherwise noted, data are given for materials in their standard state (at 25 °C [77 °F], 100 kPa). verify (what is ?) Infobox references

Sodium selenate is the inorganic compound with the formula Na_{2}SeO_{4}. It exists as the anhydrous salt, the heptahydrate, and the decahydrate. These are white, water-soluble solids. The decahydrate is a common ingredient in multivitamins and livestock feed as a source of selenium. The anhydrous salt is used in the production of some glass. Although the selenates are much more toxic, many physical properties of sodium selenate and sodium sulfate are similar.

== Production ==
Sodium selenate is produced by oxidation of selenium, first with nitric acid, producing selenous acid. The selenous acid is neutralized to form sodium selenite. The sodium selenite is oxidized in a basic medium hydrogen peroxide to form a selenate, which is then spray-dried. (Note: US patent 4605544, Björnberg, Arne; Martensson, Ulf S. & Paulsson, Karin M., "Method for producing selenium salts", issued 1986-08-12)

Se + 2HNO_{3} → H_{2}SeO_{3} + NO + NO_{2}
H_{2}SeO_{3} + Na_{2}CO_{3} → Na_{2}SeO_{3} + H_{2}O + CO_{2}
Na_{2}SeO_{3} + H_{2}O_{2} → Na_{2}SeO_{4} + H_{2}O.

It was prepared shortly after the discovery of selenium by Jöns Jacob Berzelius in 1817.

== Industrial uses ==
=== Glass manufacturing ===
One of the earliest applications of sodium selenate was in the glass industry. Selenium produces a red hue in glass. The molten glass is treated with sodium selenate and then arsenic trioxide to reduce the compound and provide elemental selenium. Sodium selenate is also used as a decolorizing agent in glass production. The red hue it gives glass is complementary to the green hue given by ferrous oxides in the manufacturing process. When used together, the two compound produce a colourless glass.

=== Pesticide ===
Sodium selenate is a common ingredient in some insecticides used against mites, aphids, and mealybugs. For most insects, a dose of 10 mg/kg is enough to be fatal. It is also used in some fungicides.

=== Bio-fortification of crops ===
Sodium selenate is effectively used for bio-fortification of crops hence fortifying food/feed to mitigate selenium deficiency in humans and livestock. It can be applied as foliar spray or via rooting medium e.g. added in fertilizers.

== Dietary supplement ==
Chosen for its selenium content and high solubility, sodium selenate is a common ingredient in over-the-counter vitamin supplements. Selenium is a trace essential element. Sodium selenate and selenite are also common in premix animal feed. Neither compound has demonstrated a difference in the amount of selenium absorbed. The US FDA regulates that animal feed contain no more than 5 ppm selenium content. Controversy arose in 2009 when a group of 21 polo horses died from selenium poisoning from an incorrectly mixed dietary supplement.

== Toxicology ==
The US FDA and European Union currently classify sodium selenate as toxic, primarily if ingested or inhaled. Testing on rats showed a dose of 1.6 mg/kg to be lethal. A low lethal dose as this places the chemical as being 2 to 3 times more toxic than sodium cyanide. As such, it is extremely toxic and must be handled with care. For a 70 kilograms (150 lb) person, this dosage corresponds to 112 mg, or, in terms of 200 μg pills, 560 pills. Chronic exposure to sodium selenate can cause severe lung, kidney, and liver damage.

Overexposure to selenium in the diet leads to a condition known as selenosis. Selenosis occurs at blood levels greater than 100 μg/dL. Symptoms include gastrointestinal upsets, hair loss, white blotchy nails, garlic breath odour, fatigue, irritability, and mild nerve damage. (Note: "Selenium: Fact Sheet for Health Professionals". National Institutes of Health. 2021-03-26. Archived from the original on 2022-06-18.)
