= Cerium(III) sulfate =

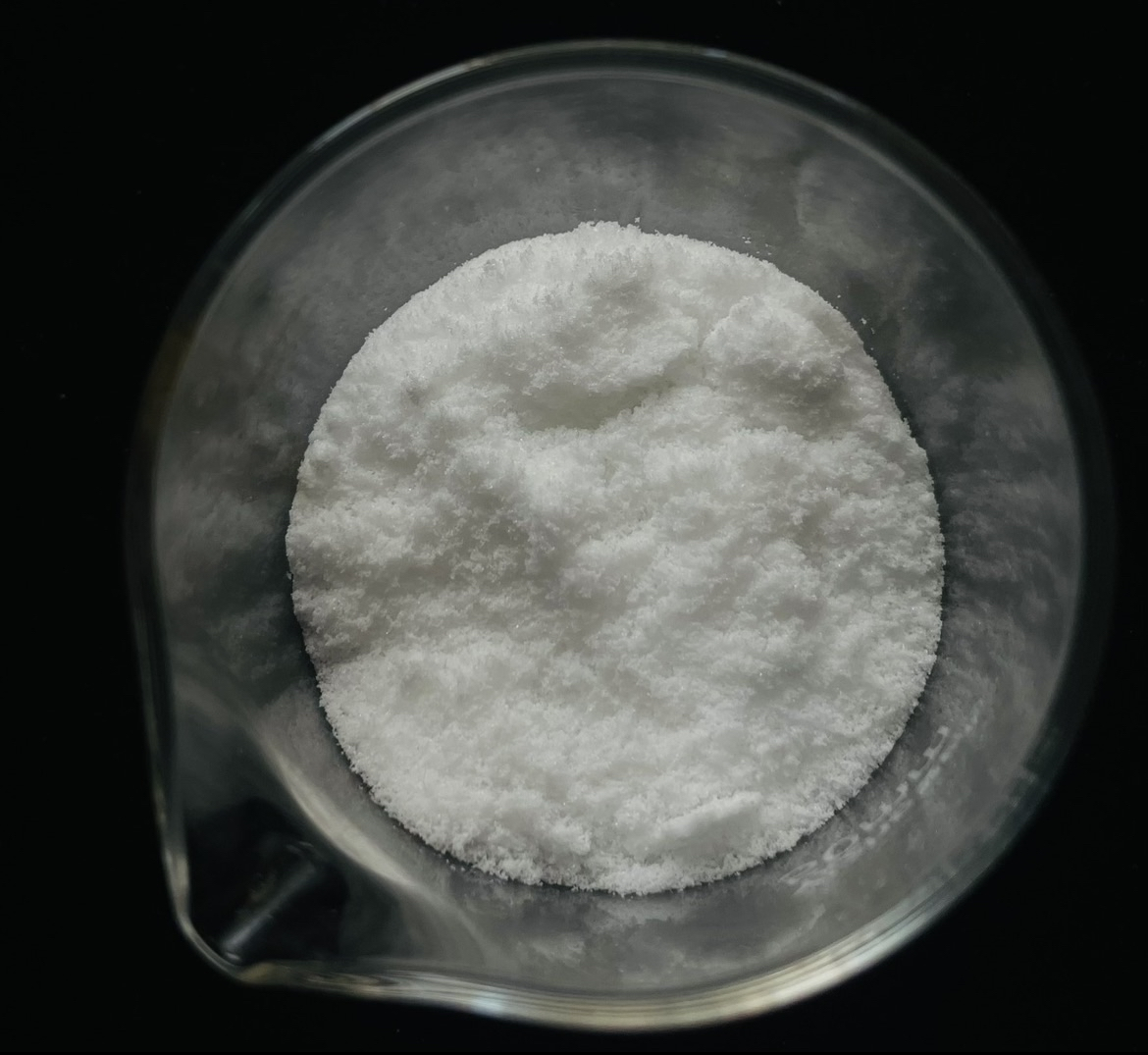
- Hydrate

- Cerium(III) sulfate

Names
- IUPAC name Cerium(III) sulfate
- Other names Cerous sulfate

Identifiers
CAS Number	13454-94-9
3D model (JSmol)	Interactive image
ChemSpider	140394
ECHA InfoCard	100.033.299
EC Number	236-644-6, 246-392-9
PubChem CID	159674
UNII	0VF70O14R1
CompTox Dashboard (EPA)	DTXSID90890694
- InChI: InChI=1S/2Ce.3H2O4S/c;;3*1-5(2,3)4/h;;3*(H2,1,2,3,4)/q2*+3;;;/p-6 Key: OZECDDHOAMNMQI-UHFFFAOYSA-H
- SMILES: [O-]S(=O)(=O)[O-].[O-]S(=O)(=O)[O-].[O-]S(=O)(=O)[O-].[Ce+3].[Ce+3]

Properties
Chemical formula	Ce_{2}(SO_{4})_{3}
Molar mass	568.42 g/mol (anhydrous)
Appearance	White to off white solid (anhydrous)
Density	2.886 g/mL at (25 °C)
Melting point	920 °C (1,690 °F; 1,190 K) (decomposes)
Boiling point	NA
Solubility in water	9.25 g/100 mL (20 °C) Hygroscopic

Hazards
- GHS labelling
Pictograms	(GHS07: Exclamation mark)
Signal word	Warning
Hazard statements	H315, H319, H335
Precautionary statements	P261, P264, P271, P280, P302+P352, P304+P340, P305+P351+P338, P312, P321, P332+P313, P337+P313, P362, P403+P233, P405, P501
Safety data sheet (SDS)	External MSDS
- Except where otherwise noted, data are given for materials in their standard state (at 25 °C [77 °F], 100 kPa). verify (what is ?) Infobox references

Cerium(III) sulfate, also called cerous sulfate, is an inorganic compound with the formula Ce_{2}(SO_{4})_{3}. It is one of the few salts whose solubility in water decreases with rising temperature.

Cerium(III) sulfate (anhydrous) is a hygroscopic white solid, which begins to decompose above 600°C. It has a monoclinic crystal structure.

Cerium(III) sulfate tetrahydrate is a white solid that releases its water of crystallisation at 220 °C. It has (like the white octahydrate) a monoclinic crystal structure with the space group P2_{1}/c (space group 14). The nonahydrate has a hexagonal crystal structure with the space group P6_{3}/m (space group 176). Hydrates of this compound are known with 12, 9, 8, 5, 4 and 2 parts of water of crystallisation.

== See also ==
- Cerium(IV) sulfate
- Cerium(III) nitrate
