= Potassium selenate =

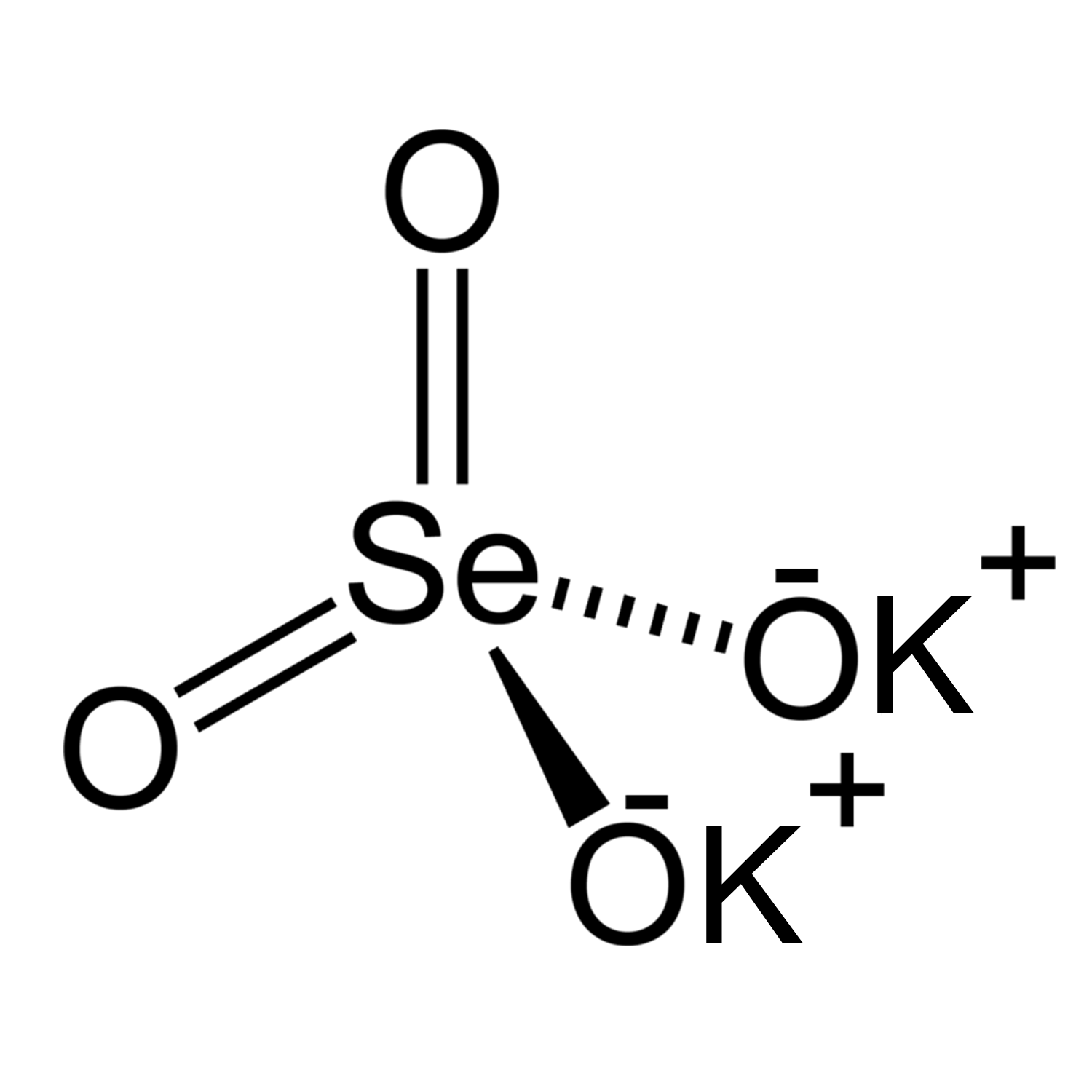

Identifiers
CAS Number	7790-59-2
3D model (JSmol)	Interactive image
ChemSpider	56431
ECHA InfoCard	100.029.286
EC Number	232-214-7
PubChem CID	62680
RTECS number	VS6600000
UNII	99798PU7MI
CompTox Dashboard (EPA)	DTXSID00889579
- InChI: InChI=1S/2K.H2O4Se/c;;1-5(2,3)4/h;;(H2,1,2,3,4)/q2*+1;/p-2 Key: YAZJAPBTUDGMKO-UHFFFAOYSA-L
- SMILES: [K+].[K+].[O-][Se]([O-])(=O)=O

Properties
Chemical formula	K_{2}SeO_{4}
Molar mass	221.2 g/mol
Appearance	colorless crystals hygroscopic
Odor	odorless
Density	3.07 g/cm3
Solubility in water	1.07 g/ml (0 °C); 1.11 g/ml (20 °C); 1.22 g/ml (100 °C)
Refractive index (n_{D})	1.539

Structure
Crystal structure	orthorhombic

Hazards
- GHS labelling
Pictograms	(GHS06: Toxic) (GHS08: Health hazard) (GHS09: Environmental hazard)
Signal word	Warning
Hazard statements	H301, H331, H373, H410
Precautionary statements	P260, P264, P270, P271, P273, P301+P316, P304+P340, P316, P319, P321, P330, P391, P403+P233, P405, P501
NFPA 704 (fire diamond)	3 1 0

Related compounds
Other anions	Potassium sulfate
Other cations	Sodium selenate
- Except where otherwise noted, data are given for materials in their standard state (at 25 °C [77 °F], 100 kPa). Infobox references

Potassium selenate, K_{2}SeO_{4}, is an odorless, white solid that forms as the potassium salt of selenic acid.

== Preparation ==
Potassium selenate is produced by the reaction of selenium trioxide and potassium hydroxide.

SeO_{3} + 2 KOH → K_{2}SeO_{4} + H_{2}O

Alternatively, it can be made by treating selenous acid with potassium hydroxide, followed by oxidation of the resulting potassium selenite with bromine water.

H_{2}SeO_{3} + 2 KOH → K_{2}SeO_{3} + 2 H_{2}O
K_{2}SeO_{3} + 2 KOH + Br_{2} → K_{2}SeO_{4} + 2 KBr + H_{2}O

== Uses ==
Potassium selenate can be used to produce selenium trioxide. It can also use to treat selenium deficiency in livestock.
