= Selenate =

Anion of selenium with 4 oxygen atoms

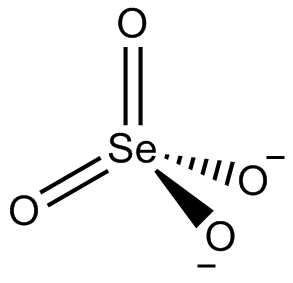

Names
- IUPAC name selenate
- Other names selenate ion

Identifiers
CAS Number	14124-68-6
3D model (JSmol)	Interactive image
ChEBI	CHEBI:15075
ChemSpider	24657
PubChem CID	26473
UNII	6X37R1DB70
UN number	2630 (SELENATES)
- InChI: InChI=1S/H2O4Se/c1-5(2,3)4/h(H2,1,2,3,4)/p-2 Key: QYHFIVBSNOWOCQ-UHFFFAOYSA-L
- SMILES: [O-][Se+2]([O-])([O-])[O-]

Properties
Chemical formula	SeO_{4}^{2−}
Conjugate acid	Hydrogen selenate
- Except where otherwise noted, data are given for materials in their standard state (at 25 °C [77 °F], 100 kPa). Infobox references

In chemistry, the selenate ion is an ion of selenium, with formula SeO^{2−}_{4}.

Selenates are analogous to sulfates and have similar chemistry. They are highly soluble in aqueous solutions at ambient temperatures.

Unlike sulfate, selenate is a somewhat good oxidizer. It can be reduced to selenite or selenium.

It is the ion corresponding to the selenic acid, H_{2}SeO_{4}, which, like the sulfuric acid, is a strong acid. Unlike the sulfuric acid, concentrated selenic acid can dissolve gold. In strongly acidic conditions, the hydrogen selenate ion, HSeO^{−}_{4}, is formed.

The element selenium exhibits several valence states. Selenate is the least reduced, followed by selenite, and elemental selenium; selenide is even more reduced than elemental selenium. The valence state is an important factor to the toxicity of selenium. Selenate is the form required by organisms that need selenium as a micronutrient. These organisms have the ability to acquire, metabolize and excrete selenium. The level at which selenium becomes toxic varies from species to species and is related to other environmental factors like pH and alkalinity that influence the concentration of selenite over selenate.

Selenate and other forms of selenium are highest in areas where ancient seas have evaporated. These areas are enriched in selenium, and some plants evolved into hyperaccumulators of selenium.
