= Selenic acid =

Structural formula of selenic acid
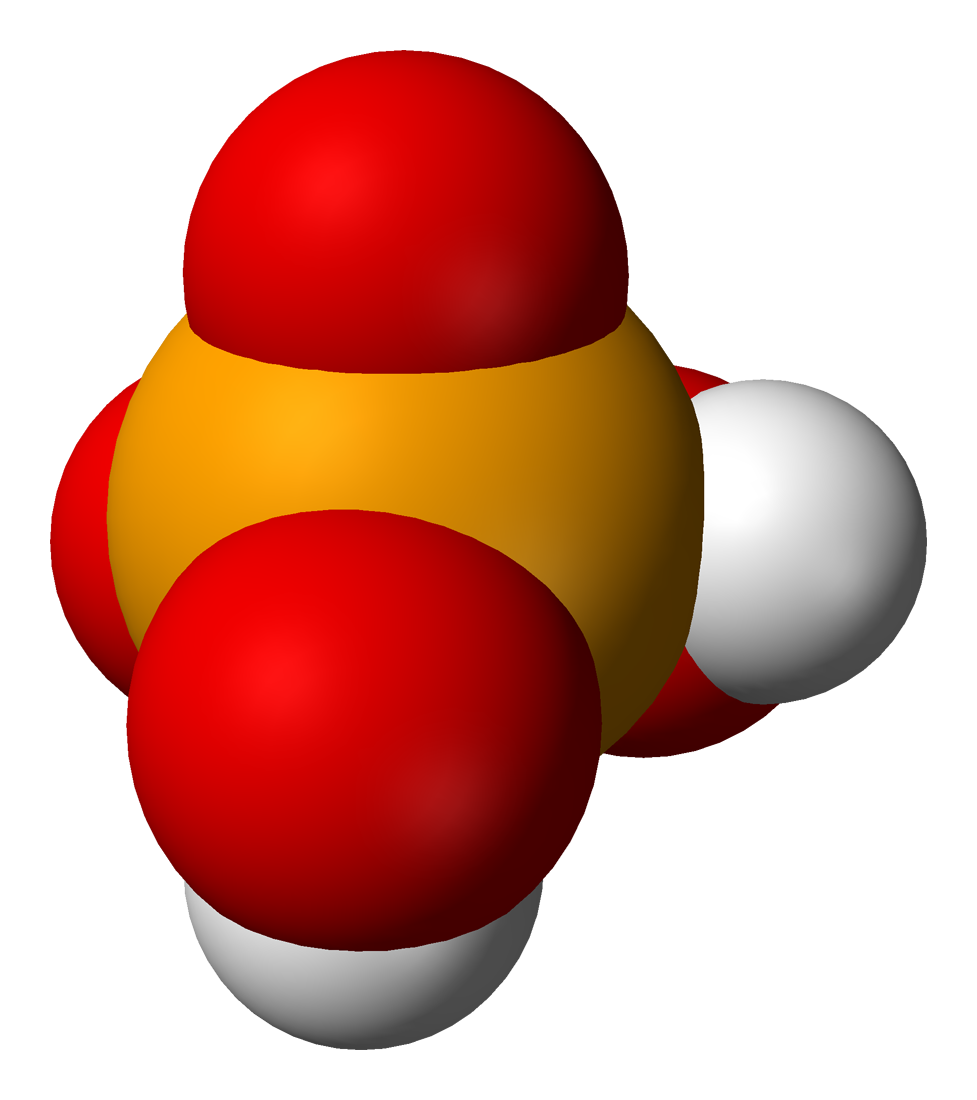
Space-filling model of selenic acid
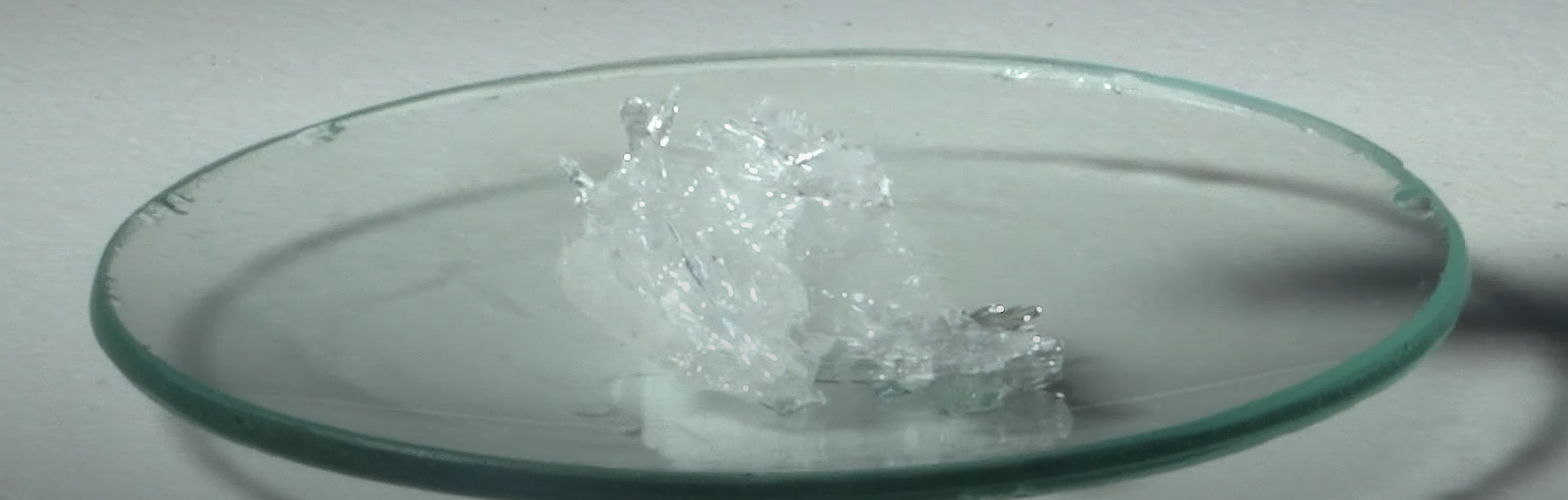

Names
- IUPAC name Selenic(VI) acid
- Other names Selenic acid

Identifiers
| CAS Number | 7783-08-6 |
| 3D model (JSmol) | Interactive image |
| ChEBI | CHEBI:18170 |
| ChemSpider | 1058 |
| ECHA InfoCard | 100.029.072 |
| EC Number | 231-979-4 |
| KEGG | C05697 |
| PubChem CID | 1089 |
| RTECS number | VS6575000 |
| UNII | HV0Y51NC4J |
| UN number | 1905 |
| CompTox Dashboard (EPA) | DTXSID2064818 |
- InChI: InChI=1S/H2O4Se/c1-5(2,3)4/h(H2,1,2,3,4) Key: QYHFIVBSNOWOCQ-UHFFFAOYSA-N; InChI=1/H2O4Se/c1-5(2,3)4/h(H2,1,2,3,4) Key: QYHFIVBSNOWOCQ-UHFFFAOYAI
- SMILES: O[Se+2]([O-])([O-])O

Properties
| Chemical formula | H_{2}SeO_{4} |
| Molar mass | 144.9734 g/mol |
| Appearance | Colorless deliquescent crystals |
| Density | 2.95 g/cm^{3}, solid |
| Melting point | 58 °C (136 °F; 331 K) |
| Boiling point | 260 °C (500 °F; 533 K) (decomposes) |
| Solubility in water | 130 g/(100 mL) (30 °C) |
| Acidity (pK_{a}) | pK_{a1} = −3 pK_{a2} = 1.9 |
| Conjugate base | Biselenate |
| Magnetic susceptibility (χ) | −51.2·10^{−6} cm^{3}/mol |
| Refractive index (n_{D}) | 1.5174 (D-line, 20 °C) |

Structure
| Molecular shape | tetrahedral at Se |

Hazards
- Occupational safety and health (OHS/OSH)
| Main hazards | Corrosive, highly toxic |
- GHS labelling
| Pictograms | (GHS05: Corrosive) (GHS06: Toxic) (GHS08: Health hazard) (GHS09: Environmental hazard) |
| Signal word | Danger |
| Hazard statements | H301, H315, H318, H331, H373, H410 |
| Precautionary statements | P260, P264, P270, P271, P273, P280, P301+P310, P302+P352, P304+P340, P305+P351+P338, P310, P311, P314, P321, P330, P332+P313, P362, P391, P403+P233, P405, P501 |
| NFPA 704 (fire diamond) | 3 0 2 OX |

Related compounds
| Other anions | selenious acid hydrogen selenide |
| Other cations | sodium selenate potassium selenate |
| Related compounds | Sulfuric acid; Selenium dioxide; Selenium trioxide; Telluric acid |
- Except where otherwise noted, data are given for materials in their standard state (at 25 °C [77 °F], 100 kPa). verify (what is ?) Infobox references

Selenic acid is the inorganic compound with the formula H_{2}SeO_{4}. It is an oxoacid of selenium, and its structure is more accurately described as O_{2}Se(OH)_{2}. It is a colorless compound. Although it has few uses, one of its salts, sodium selenate is used in the production of glass and animal feeds.

== Structure and bonding ==
The molecule is tetrahedral, as predicted by VSEPR theory. The Se–O bond length is 161 pm. In the solid state, it crystallizes in an orthorhombic structure.

== Preparation ==
It is prepared by oxidising selenium compounds in lower oxidation states. One method involves the oxidation of selenium dioxide with hydrogen peroxide:

SeO_{2} + H_{2}O_{2} → H_{2}SeO_{4}

Unlike the production of sulfuric acid by hydration of sulfur trioxide, the hydration of selenium trioxide is an impractical method. Instead, selenic acid may also be prepared by the oxidation of selenous acid (H_{2}SeO_{3}) with halogens, such as chlorine or bromine, or with potassium permanganate. Using chlorine or bromine as the oxidising agents also produces hydrochloric or hydrobromic acid as a side-product, which needs to be removed from the solution since they can reduce the selenic acid to selenous acid.

To obtain the anhydrous acid as a crystalline solid, the resulting solution is evaporated at temperatures below 140 °C (413 K; 284 °F) in a vacuum.

== Reactions ==
Like sulfuric acid, selenic acid is a strong acid that is hygroscopic and extremely soluble in water. Concentrated solutions are viscous. Crystalline mono- and di-hydrates are known. The monohydrate melts at 26 °C, and the dihydrate melts at −51.7 °C.

Selenic acid is a stronger oxidizer than sulfuric acid, capable of liberating chlorine from chloride ions, being reduced to selenous acid in the process:

H_{2}SeO_{4} + 2 H^{+} + 2 Cl^{−} → H_{2}SeO_{3} + H_{2}O + Cl_{2}

It decomposes above 200 °C, liberating oxygen gas and being reduced to selenous acid:

2 H_{2}SeO_{4} → 2 H_{2}SeO_{3} + O_{2}

Selenic acid reacts with barium salts to precipitate solid BaSeO_{4}, analogous to the sulfate. In general, selenate salts resemble sulfate salts, but are more soluble. Many selenate salts have the same crystal structure as the corresponding sulfate salts.

Treatment with fluorosulfuric acid gives selenoyl fluoride:

H_{2}SeO_{4} + 2 HSO_{3}F → SeO_{2}F_{2} + 2 H_{2}SO_{4}

Hot, concentrated selenic acid reacts with gold, forming a reddish-yellow solution of gold(III) selenate:

2 Au + 6 H_{2}SeO_{4} → Au_{2}(SeO_{4})_{3} + 3 H_{2}SeO_{3} + 3 H_{2}O

== Applications ==
Selenic acid is used as a specialized oxidizing agent.
