= Tribromide =

Tribromide anion

Tribromide is the anion with the chemical formula Br^{−}_{3}, or salts containing it:

- Tetrabutylammonium tribromide
- Tetrabromophosphonium tribromide
- Pyridinium perbromide

Sodium and potassium tribromides can be prepared by reacting NaBr or KBr with aqueous bromine.

Br^{−} + Br_{2} → Br^{−}_{3}

Tribromide may also refer to binary chemical compounds containing three bromine atoms:

- Actinium tribromide, AcBr_{3}
- Aluminium tribromide, AlBr_{3}
- Americium tribromide, AmBr_{3}
- Antimony tribromide, SbBr_{3}
- Arsenic tribromide, AsBr_{3}
- Berkelium tribromide, BkBr_{3}
- Bismuth tribromide, BiBr_{3}
- Boron tribromide, BBr_{3}
- Californium tribromide, CfBr_{3}
- Cerium tribromide, CeBr_{3}
- Chromium tribromide, CrBr_{3}
- Curium tribromide, CmBr_{3}
- Dysprosium tribromide, DyBr_{3}
- Einsteinium tribromide, EsBr_{3}
- Erbium tribromide, ErBr_{3}
- Europium tribromide, EuBr_{3}
- Ferric tribromide, FeBr_{3}
- Gadolinium tribromide, GdBr_{3}
- Gallium tribromide, GaBr_{3}
- Gold tribromide, AuBr_{3} or Au_{2}Br_{6}
- Holmium tribromide, HoBr_{3}
- Indium tribromide, InBr_{3}
- Iodine tribromide, IBr_{3}
- Iridium tribromide, IrBr_{3}
- Iron tribromide, FeBr_{3}
- Lanthanum tribromide, LaBr_{3}
- Lutetium tribromide, LuBr_{3}
- Molybdenum tribromide, MoBr_{3}
- Neodymium tribromide, NdBr_{3}
- Neptunium tribromide, NpBr_{3}
- Nitrogen tribromide, NBr_{3}
- Osmium tribromide, OsBr_{3}
- Phosphorus tribromide, PBr_{3}
- Plutonium tribromide, PuBr_{3}
- Praseodymium tribromide, PrBr_{3}
- Promethium tribromide, PmBr_{3}
- Rhenium tribromide, ReBr_{3}
- Rhodium tribromide, RhBr_{3}
- Ruthenium tribromide, RuBr_{3}
- Samarium tribromide, SmBr_{3}
- Scandium tribromide, ScBr_{3}
- Terbium tribromide, TbBr_{3}
- Titanium tribromide, TiBr_{3}
- Thulium tribromide, TmBr_{3}
- Vanadium tribromide, VBr_{3}
- Ytterbium tribromide, YbBr_{3}
- Yttrium tribromide, YBr_{3}
- Zirconium tribromide, ZrBr_{3}
