= Dysprosium(III) fluoride =

Identifiers
CAS Number	13569-80-7
3D model (JSmol)	Interactive image
ChemSpider	75417
ECHA InfoCard	100.033.615
EC Number	236-992-9
PubChem CID	83587
CompTox Dashboard (EPA)	DTXSID7065542
- InChI: InChI=1S/Dy.3FH/h;3*1H/q+3;;;/p-3 Key: FWQVINSGEXZQHB-UHFFFAOYSA-K
- SMILES: F[Dy](F)F

Properties
Chemical formula	DyF_{3}
Molar mass	219.50
Appearance	White crystalline powder
Density	6.9 g/cm^{3}
Melting point	1,740 °C

Hazards
- GHS labelling
Pictograms	(GHS07: Exclamation mark)
Signal word	Warning
Hazard statements	H315, H319, H335

Related compounds
Other anions	Dysprosium(III) chloride, Dysprosium(III) bromide, Dysprosium(III) iodide
- Except where otherwise noted, data are given for materials in their standard state (at 25 °C [77 °F], 100 kPa). Infobox references

Dysprosium(III) fluoride is an inorganic compound of dysprosium with a chemical formula DyF_{3}.

== Production ==
Dysprosium(III) fluoride can be produced by mixing dysprosium(III) chloride or dysprosium(III) carbonate into 40% hydrofluoric acid.

DyCl_{3} + 3 HF → DyF_{3} + 3 HCl
Dy_{2}(CO_{3})_{3} + 6 HF → 2 DyF_{3} + 3 H_{2}O + 3 CO_{2}

DyF_{3} can also be produced by hydrothermal reaction of dysprosium nitrate and sodium tetrafluoroborate at 200 °C.

DyF_{3} can also be produced when dysprosium oxide and ammonium bifluoride are mixed and heated to 300 °C until the oxide is porous, and continued to heat to 700 °C. When hydrogen fluoride is introduced, a reaction occurs:

Dy_{2}O_{3} + 6 HF → 2 DyF_{3} + 3 H_{2}O

== Properties ==
Dysprosium(III) fluoride is a white, odorless solid that is insoluble in water. It has an orthorhombic crystal structure with the space group Pnma (space group no. 62).
