= Dysprosium(II) iodide =

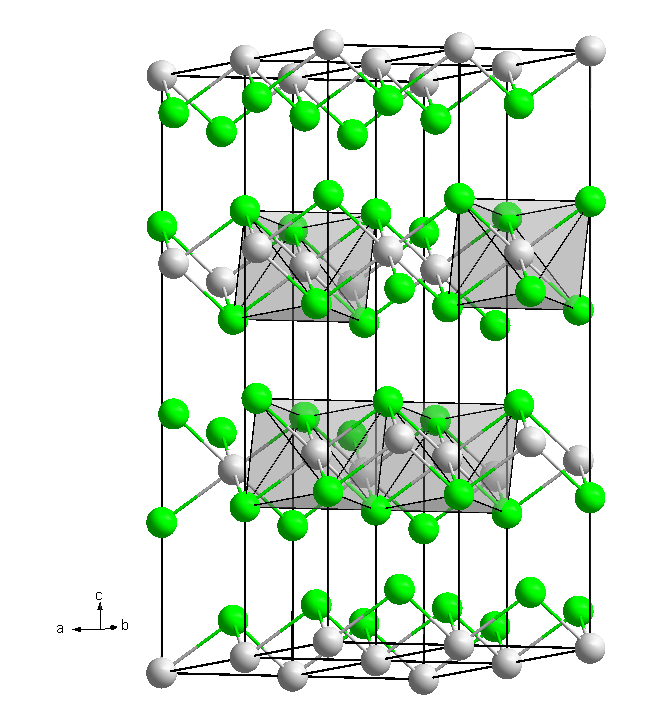

Identifiers
CAS Number	36377-94-3
3D model (JSmol)	Interactive image
ChemSpider	23346232
ECHA InfoCard	100.151.507
EC Number	622-765-5
PubChem CID	71431174
CompTox Dashboard (EPA)	DTXSID20849397
- InChI: InChI=1S/Dy.2HI/h;2*1H/p-2 Key: SSDFPWIJYIKUFK-UHFFFAOYSA-L
- SMILES: [I-].[I-].[Dy+2]

Properties
Chemical formula	DyI_{2}
Molar mass	416.309 g·mol^{−1}
Appearance	dark purple-black solid
Melting point	659 °C

Hazards
- GHS labelling
Pictograms	(GHS07: Exclamation mark)
Signal word	Warning
Hazard statements	H315, H319, H335
Precautionary statements	P261, P264, P264+P265, P271, P280, P302+P352, P304+P340, P305+P351+P338, P319, P321, P332+P317, P337+P317, P362+P364, P403+P233, P405, P501

Related compounds
Other anions	dysprosium(II) chloride dysprosium(II) bromide
Related compounds	dysprosium(III) iodide
- Except where otherwise noted, data are given for materials in their standard state (at 25 °C [77 °F], 100 kPa). Infobox references

Dysprosium(II) iodide is an iodide of dysprosium with the chemical formula DyI_{2}.

== Preparation ==
Dysprosium(II) iodide can be produced by reducing dysprosium(III) iodide with metallic dysprosium under a vacuum at 800 to 900 °C:

Dy + 2 DyI_{3} → 3 DyI_{2}

It can also be formed by the reaction of dysprosium and mercury(II) iodide:

Dy + HgI_{2} → DyI_{2} + Hg

It can also be formed by the direct reaction of dysprosium and iodine.

Dy + I_{2} → DyI_{2}

== Properties ==
Dysprosium(II) iodide is a dark purple-black solid that is easily deliquescent and can only be stored in a dry inert gas or a vacuum. In the air, it will absorb moisture and become a hydrate, but they are unstable and will quickly convert into iodide oxides and release hydrogen gas. This process occurs faster in the presence of water. This compound has the same crystal structure as cadmium chloride. It can form complexes with tetrahydrofuran, butanol and phenol.

== Uses ==
The reaction between dysprosium(II) iodide and silicon tetrachloride produces trichlorosilyl radicals, which can catalyze the trimerization of alkynes.
