= Dysprosium(III) carbonate =

Names
- Other names: Didysprosium tricarbonate; Dysprosium carbonate

Identifiers
CAS Number	5066-34-2; tetrahydrate: 38245-35-1
3D model (JSmol)	Interactive image; tetrahydrate: Interactive image
ChemSpider	144896
ECHA InfoCard	100.023.428
EC Number	225-770-7
PubChem CID	165282 (anhydrous); 129831846 (trihydrate); tetrahydrate: 25021600
CompTox Dashboard (EPA)	DTXSID50890594; tetrahydrate: DTXSID40648460
- InChI: InChI=1S/3CH2O3.2Dy/c3*2-1(3)4;;/h3*(H2,2,3,4);;/q;;;2*+3/p-6 Key: QGXMZGYYAAPYRV-UHFFFAOYSA-H; tetrahydrate: InChI=1S/3CH2O3.2Dy.4H2O/c3*2-1(3)4;;;;;;/h3*(H2,2,3,4);;;4*1H2/q;;;2*+3;;;;/p-6 Key: BQRZSEZQNZPPPU-UHFFFAOYSA-H
- SMILES: C(=O)([O-])[O-].C(=O)([O-])[O-].C(=O)([O-])[O-].[Dy+3].[Dy+3]; tetrahydrate: C(=O)([O-])[O-].C(=O)([O-])[O-].C(=O)([O-])[O-].O.O.O.O.[Dy+3].[Dy+3]

Properties
Chemical formula	Dy_{2}(CO_{3})_{3}
Molar mass	505.024 g·mol^{−1}
Appearance	white solid
Solubility in water	insoluble

Hazards
- GHS labelling
Pictograms	(GHS07: Exclamation mark)
Signal word	Warning
Hazard statements	H315, H319, H335
Precautionary statements	P261, P264, P264+P265, P271, P280, P302+P352, P304+P340, P305+P351+P338, P319, P321, P332+P317, P337+P317, P362+P364, P403+P233, P405, P501
- Except where otherwise noted, data are given for materials in their standard state (at 25 °C [77 °F], 100 kPa). Infobox references

Dysprosium(III) carbonate is an inorganic compound with the chemical formula Dy_{2}(CO_{3})_{3}. It is a white, paramagnetic solid.

== Properties ==
An amorphous tetrahydrate exists, stable in air up to near the decomposition temperature. It progressively loses water upon heating and is directly converted to dysprosium oxide (Dy_{2}O_{3}) by dehydration and carbonate calcination:

Dy_{2}(CO_{3})_{3}·xH_{2}O → Dy_{2}O_{3} + xH_{2}O + 3 CO_{2}

An orthorhombic kozoite-type DyCO_{3}OH forms under hydrothermal conditions, and a poorly crystalline tengerite-type Dy_{2}(CO_{3})·2-3H_{2}O remains stable at ambient temperature.

== Preparation ==
Dysprosium(III) carbonate can be prepared by reacting a soluble dysprosium salt such as dysprosium(III) chloride with sodium carbonate, forming a white gel-like precipitate. The flow rate of the Dy(III) solution and the reactor temperature affect the particle size of the product.

Another method involves the hydrolysis of dysprosium trichloroacetate in a homogeneous phase reaction:

2 Dy(Cl_{3}CCOO)_{3} + (x+3)H_{2}O → Dy_{2}(CO_{3})_{3}·xH_{2}O + 3 CO_{2} + 6 CHCl_{3}

Carbon dioxide and chloroform are formed as byproducts in this reaction.

It can also be prepared by passing carbon dioxide through a suspension of dysprosium hydroxide or oxide in water. The conversion is slow and may not produce a pure product. The reaction is fast with higher yields if supercritical CO_{2} at high pressure is used instead.

== Uses ==
It can be used as a photocatalyst for the degradation of methyl orange under ultraviolet light.

== Related compounds ==
The crystal structures of the hydroxide carbonate (DyOHCO_{3}) and another basic carbonate (Dy_{2}O_{2}CO_{3}) have been determined. They can be prepared by hydrothermal synthesis involving the reaction of dysprosium(III) chloride and carbon dioxide with caesium carbonate and potassium carbonate respectively.

The dysprosium tetracarbonate complex [C(NH_{2})_{3}]_{4}[Dy(CO_{3})_{4}(H_{2}O)](H_{3}O)·13H_{2}O has been characterized by single-crystal X-ray diffraction. It can be prepared by treating saturated guanidinium carbonate solution with dysprosium nitrate.
