= Lanthanide tribromide =

Structure of La_{2}(μ-X)_{2}(H_{2}O)_{14}]^{4+} (X = Cl, Br).

Lanthanide tribromides are a family of inorganic compounds with the formula LnBr_{3}, where Ln stands for a lanthanide metal. The tribromides are similar to the more widely used lanthanide trichlorides. They exist as anhydrous solids and as hydrates. For the hydrates, three structural motifs are recognized: [Ln_{2}(μ-Br)_{2}(H_{2}O)_{14}]Br_{4}, [LnBr_{2}(H_{2}O)_{6}]Br, and [Ln(H_{2}O)_{8}]Br_{3}. The former two are also observed for the lanthanum trichlorides, but the last motif is unique to the bromides.

They can be prepared by heating the hydrated lanthanide bromides with excess ammonium bromide under an atmosphere of hydrogen bromide.

== Inventory ==
Lanthanide bromides
Ln	formula for hydrate	relationship to hydrated trichloride
LaBr_{3}	[La_{2}(μ-Br)_{2}(H_{2}O)_{14}]Br_{4}	Like the corresponding chloride
CeBr_{3}	[Ce_{2}(μ-Br)_{2}(H_{2}O)_{14}]Br_{4}	Like the corresponding chloride
PrBr_{3}	[PrBr_{2}(H_{2}O)_{6}]Br	Like the corresponding chloride
NdBr_{3}	[NdBr_{2}(H_{2}O)_{6}]Br	Like the corresponding chloride
PmBr_{3}	[PmBr_{2}(H_{2}O)_{6}]Br	Like the corresponding chloride
SmBr_{3}	[SmBr_{2}(H_{2}O)_{6}]Br	Like the corresponding chloride
EuBr_{3}	[EuBr_{2}(H_{2}O)_{6}]Br	Like the corresponding chloride
GdBr_{3}	[GdBr_{2}(H_{2}O)_{6}]Br	Like the corresponding chloride
TbBr_{3}	[TbBr_{2}(H_{2}O)_{6}]Br	Like the corresponding chloride
DyBr_{3}	[DyBr_{2}(H_{2}O)_{6}]Br	Like the corresponding chloride
HoBr_{3}	[Ho(H_{2}O)_{8}]Br_{3}	chloride adopts [LnCl_{2}(H_{2}O)_{6}]Cl motif
ErBr_{3}	[Er(H_{2}O)_{8}]Br_{3}	chloride adopts [LnCl_{2}(H_{2}O)_{6}]Cl motif
TmBr_{3}	[Tm(H_{2}O)_{8}]Br_{3}	chloride adopts [LnCl_{2}(H_{2}O)_{6}]Cl motif
YbBr_{3}	[Yb(H_{2}O)_{8}]Br_{3}	chloride adopts [LnCl_{2}(H_{2}O)_{6}]Cl motif
LuBr_{3}	[Lu(H_{2}O)_{8}]Br_{3}	chloride adopts [LnCl_{2}(H_{2}O)_{6}]Cl motif
