= Dysprosium(III) selenate =

Names
- Other names Dysprosium selenate

Identifiers
CAS Number	anhydrous: 20148-58-7; octahydrate: 13476-03-4
3D model (JSmol)	anhydrous: Interactive image; octahydrate: Interactive image
PubChem CID	anhydrous: 20432113
- InChI: anhydrous: InChI=1S/2Dy.3H2O4Se/c;;3*1-5(2,3)4/h;;3*(H2,1,2,3,4)/q2*+3;;;/p-6 Key: SHJYUWCJDWRMIS-UHFFFAOYSA-H
- SMILES: anhydrous: [O-][Se](=O)(=O)[O-].[O-][Se](=O)(=O)[O-].[O-][Se](=O)(=O)[O-].[Dy+3].[Dy+3]; octahydrate: [O-][Se](=O)(=O)[O-].[O-][Se](=O)(=O)[O-].[O-][Se](=O)(=O)[O-].[Dy+3].[Dy+3].O.O.O.O.O.O.O.O

Properties
Chemical formula	Dy_{2}(SeO_{4})_{3}
Molar mass	753.89 g/mol
Appearance	Yellow needle-like crystals
Solubility in water	Very soluble in water
- Except where otherwise noted, data are given for materials in their standard state (at 25 °C [77 °F], 100 kPa). Infobox references

Dysprosium(III) selenate is an inorganic compound of dysprosium and the selenate ion, with the chemical formula Dy_{2}(SeO_{4})_{3}. The best-characterized hydrated form is the octahydrate, Dy_{2}(SeO_{4})_{3}·8H_{2}O.

== Preparation ==
Dysprosium(III) selenate can be prepared by reaction of a soluble dysprosium(III) compound or dysprosium(III) oxide with selenic acid, followed by crystallization from aqueous solution.

The octahydrate belongs to a continuous series of rare-earth selenate octahydrates formed by the heavier lanthanides.

=== Structure and properties ===
Dysprosium(III) selenate octahydrate crystallizes in the monoclinic crystal system and is isostructural with the octahydrates of the other heavy rare-earth selenates.

The structure contains Dy^{3+} coordination polyhedra linked to SeO_{4} tetrahedra, with coordinated water molecules completing the dysprosium coordination environment.

Infrared spectra show the characteristic internal vibrational modes of SeO_{4}^{2−} tetrahedra together with the O–H vibrations of the water molecules.

Thermochemical data have also been reported for Dy_{2}(SeO_{4})_{3}·8H_{2}O; the OECD/NEA review gives an adopted standard enthalpy of formation of −5371.4 ± 17.5 kJ mol^{−1}, though it notes that the underlying experimental source is of uncertain quality.

=== Thermal decomposition ===
On heating, the octahydrate first loses its water of crystallization to form anhydrous Dy_{2}(SeO_{4})_{3}.

Further heating causes reduction of selenium from Se(VI) to Se(IV), producing dysprosium(III) selenite:

Dy_{2}(SeO_{4})_{3} → Dy_{2}(SeO_{3})_{3} + 3/2 O_{2}

The selenite subsequently decomposes through oxide–selenite intermediates before ultimately yielding dysprosium(III) oxide, Dy_{2}O_{3}.

== Reactions ==
Heating dysprosium selenate-derived material with lithium fluoride can produce the mixed fluoride–selenite Dy_{3}(SeO_{3})_{4}F.
