= Dysprosium arsenate =

Names
- Other names Dysprosium(III) arsenate

Identifiers
CAS Number	27746-50-5
3D model (JSmol)	Interactive image
PubChem CID	173857929
- InChI: InChI=1S/AsH3O4.Dy/c2-1(3,4)5;/h(H3,2,3,4,5);/q;+3/p-3 Key: PZUJMSFKXAXNDP-UHFFFAOYSA-K
- SMILES: [O-][As](=O)([O-])[O-].[Dy+3]

Properties
Chemical formula	DyAsO_{4}
Molar mass	301.42 g/mol
Appearance	Colorless crystalline solid
Density	6.338 g/cm^{3} (calculated, 25 °C)
Solubility in water	Sparingly soluble in water

Structure
Crystal structure	Tetragonal, xenotime type
Space group	I4_{1}/amd, No. 141
Lattice constant	a = 0.70733 nm, c = 0.63133 nm
Formula units (Z)	4
- Except where otherwise noted, data are given for materials in their standard state (at 25 °C [77 °F], 100 kPa). Infobox references

Dysprosium arsenate is an inorganic compound of dysprosium and the arsenate ion, with the formula DyAsO_{4}. It is a sparingly soluble crystalline solid with the tetragonal xenotime structure type at room temperature. At low temperature it undergoes a cooperative Jahn–Teller structural transition followed by antiferromagnetic ordering.

== Preparation ==
Dysprosium arsenate can be prepared by precipitation from aqueous solutions of a dysprosium(III) salt and a soluble arsenate. For example, reaction of dysprosium(III) chloride with sodium arsenate gives DyAsO_{4}:

DyCl_{3} + Na_{3}AsO_{4} → DyAsO_{4}↓ + 3 NaCl

This preparation has been reported for rare-earth arsenates in aqueous solution.

A sample used for standard powder-diffraction measurements was prepared from an aqueous solution of dysprosium trichloride and arsenic pentoxide and dried at 110 °C.

== Properties ==
=== Crystal structure ===
At room temperature, DyAsO_{4} crystallizes in the tetragonal crystal system, space group I4_{1}/amd (No. 141), with the xenotime or zircon structure type.

At 25 °C, lattice parameters of

a = 7.0733 Å
c = 6.3133 Å

have been reported, with four formula units per unit cell. The corresponding calculated density is 6.338 g/cm^{3}.

The structure contains isolated AsO^{3−}_{4} tetrahedra and eight-coordinate Dy^{3+} ions. As in other heavy rare-earth arsenates, the DyO_{8} polyhedra and AsO_{4} tetrahedra form a three-dimensional framework.

=== Solubility ===
Dysprosium arsenate is very sparingly soluble in water. A concentration-based solubility-product value of

pK_{sp,c} = 23.83 ± 0.06

has been reported.

=== Low-temperature phase transition ===
At approximately 11.2 K, DyAsO_{4} undergoes a cooperative Jahn–Teller structural transition from the tetragonal phase to an orthorhombic phase.

Low-temperature X-ray diffraction shows that the distortion occurs primarily in the basal plane: the tetragonal a parameter splits into unequal orthorhombic a and b axes, whereas the c parameter remains nearly unchanged. The low-temperature structure has been described in space group Imma, with representative cell dimensions near a = 7.06 Å, b = 7.03 Å and c = 6.30 Å.

The transition is driven by quadrupolar interactions associated with the dysprosium ions and is analogous to the cooperative Jahn–Teller transition in DyVO_{4}.

=== Magnetic properties ===
DyAsO_{4} undergoes a second transition at about 2.44 K, where long-range antiferromagnetic order develops.

Specific-heat measurements show λ-type anomalies at both 11.2 K, corresponding to the structural transition, and at the Néel temperature of about 2.44 K.

Neutron diffraction shows that the low-temperature magnetic structure is non-collinear and antiferromagnetic, with the Dy moments lying predominantly in the basal plane. At 2.2 K the ordered moment is about 8.6 μ_{B} per Dy ion.
