= Dysprosium(II) bromide =

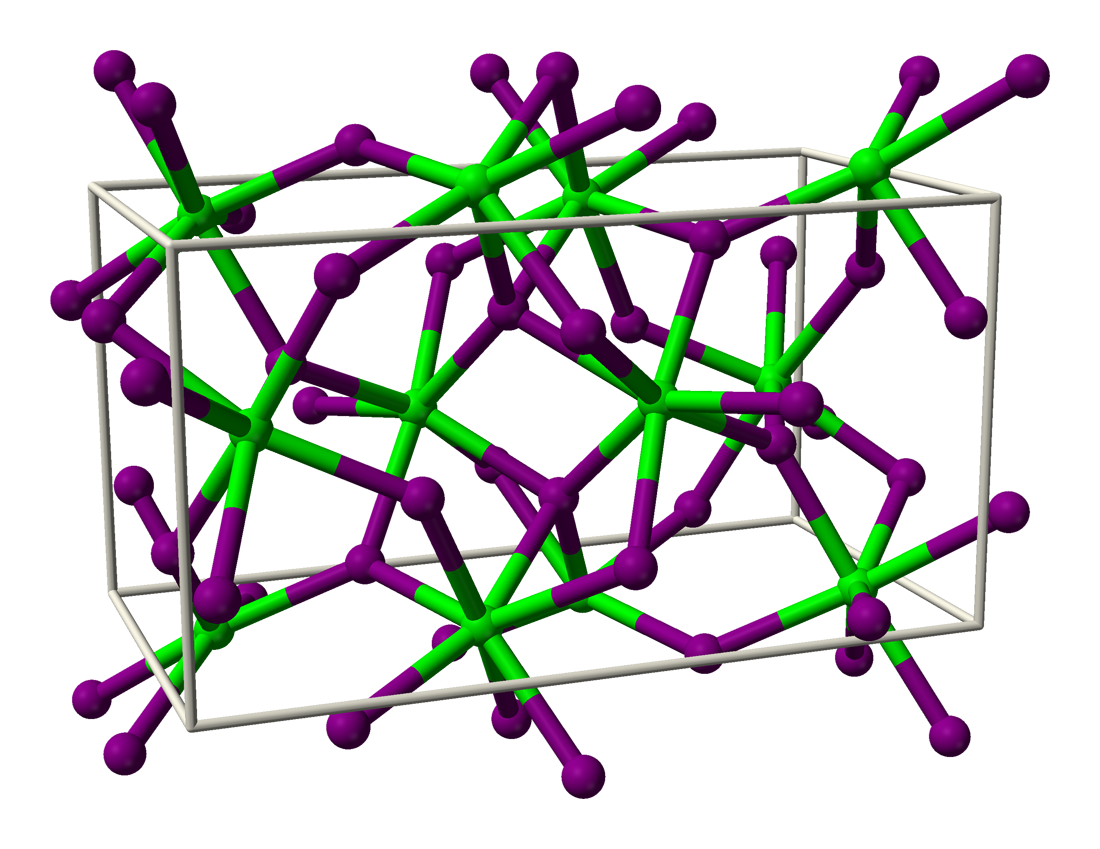

Names
- Other names Dysprosium dibromide

Identifiers
CAS Number	83229-05-4
3D model (JSmol)	Interactive image
- SMILES: Br[Dy]Br

Properties
Chemical formula	DyBr_{2}
Molar mass	322.31 g/mol
Appearance	Black crystalline solid

Structure
Crystal structure	Orthorhombic
Space group	Pbca, No. 61

Related compounds
Other anions	dysprosium(III) bromide
Other cations	samarium(II) bromide europium(II) bromide thulium(II) bromide ytterbium(II) bromide
- Except where otherwise noted, data are given for materials in their standard state (at 25 °C [77 °F], 100 kPa). Infobox references

Dysprosium(II) bromide, also known as dysprosium dibromide, is an inorganic compound of dysprosium and bromine with the chemical formula DyBr_{2}. It is one of the comparatively few binary lanthanide halides in which the lanthanide occurs in the +2 oxidation state.

== Properties ==
Dysprosium(II) bromide is a black, highly hygroscopic crystalline solid. It must be handled under rigorously dry inert gas or in high vacuum. On exposure to moist air it forms hydrated material which is unstable and gradually converts into oxybromides with evolution of hydrogen; the reaction proceeds much more rapidly in liquid water.

DyBr_{2} is a salt-like divalent rare-earth halide rather than a metallic subhalide. It adopts the strontium iodide structure type, in which Dy^{2+} is seven-coordinate by bromide ions. The structure is orthorhombic; modern crystallographic databases index DyBr_{2} in space group Pbca (No. 61).

Dysprosium(II) bromide belongs to the same structural family as the dibromides of thulium and ytterbium, which also adopt the SrI_{2}-type structure.

== Preparation ==
Dysprosium(II) bromide can be prepared by reduction of dysprosium(III) bromide with elemental dysprosium under vacuum at about 800–900 °C:

Dy + 2 DyBr_{3} → 3 DyBr_{2}

It can also be obtained by metallothermic reduction of DyBr_{3} with an alkali metal under high-temperature conditions. Reduction with sodium has been reported to give DyBr_{2}, whereas heavier alkali metals tend to form ternary bromides instead.
