= Dysprosium iodate =

Identifiers
CAS Number	14732-21-9 anhydrous; 24859-41-4 tetrahydrate
3D model (JSmol)	Interactive image
ChemSpider	20082427
ECHA InfoCard	100.035.253
EC Number	238-794-8
PubChem CID	21149367
CompTox Dashboard (EPA)	DTXSID90163673
- InChI: InChI=1S/Dy.3HIO3/c;3*2-1(3)4/h;3*(H,2,3,4)/q+3;;;/p-3 Key: ASAMDJHOONJZTG-UHFFFAOYSA-K
- SMILES: [O-]I(=O)=O.[O-]I(=O)=O.[O-]I(=O)=O.[Dy+3]

Properties
Chemical formula	Dy(IO_{3})_{3}
Molar mass	687.204 g·mol^{−1}
- Except where otherwise noted, data are given for materials in their standard state (at 25 °C [77 °F], 100 kPa). Infobox references

Dysprosium iodate is an inorganic compound with the chemical formula Dy(IO_{3})_{3}. It can be obtained by the reaction of dysprosium nitrate or dysprosium chloride and iodic acid at 200 °C. It exists in two crystal forms: α-form and β-form. Its solubility in water at 25 °C is 1.010±0.001 10^{−3} mol·dm^{−3}). Adding ethanol or methanol to water will reduce the solubility.
