= Dysprosium perchlorate =

Names
- Other names Dysprosium(III) perchlorate

Identifiers
CAS Number	14017-53-9; 14692-17-2 hexahydrate

Properties
Chemical formula	Dy(ClO_{4})_{3}
Molar mass	460.86 g/mol
Appearance	Crystalline solid
Solubility in water	Soluble in water

Structure
Crystal structure	Hexagonal (anhydrous)
Space group	P6_{3}/m, No. 176
- Except where otherwise noted, data are given for materials in their standard state (at 25 °C [77 °F], 100 kPa). Infobox references

Dysprosium perchlorate is an inorganic compound of dysprosium and the perchlorate ion, with the formula Dy(ClO_{4})_{3}. It is known as an anhydrous salt and in hydrated forms, including the hexahydrate Dy(ClO_{4})_{3}·6H_{2}O. The anhydrous compound adopts the hexagonal structure characteristic of many rare-earth perchlorates.

== Preparation ==
Hydrated dysprosium perchlorate can be prepared by dissolving dysprosium(III) oxide in aqueous perchloric acid:

Dy_{2}O_{3} + 6 HClO_{4} → 2 Dy(ClO_{4})_{3} + 3 H_{2}O

Solutions used in modern spectroscopic work have been prepared directly from Dy_{2}O_{3} and concentrated perchloric acid.

Dysprosium perchlorate hexahydrate has also been obtained by dissolving Dy_{2}O_{3} in 50–60% perchloric acid, followed by removal of excess water under reduced pressure or by freeze-drying.

Anhydrous Dy(ClO_{4})_{3} can be obtained by controlled dehydration of hydrated dysprosium perchlorate.

== Properties ==
=== Anhydrous structure ===
Anhydrous Dy(ClO_{4})_{3} crystallizes in the hexagonal crystal system, space group P6_{3}/m (No. 176).

It is isostructural with the anhydrous perchlorates of La, Ce, Pr, Nd, Sm, Eu, Gd, Tb, Ho and Er, and belongs to a structure family related to the UCl_{3} type.

In this structure the Dy^{3+} centres are nine-coordinate. The coordination environment is formed by oxygen atoms belonging to perchlorate groups, which act as multidentate ligands and generate a three-dimensional channel-containing framework.

Across the lanthanide series, the lattice parameters decrease systematically because of the lanthanide contraction.

=== Hydrates and aqueous solution ===
The hexahydrate Dy(ClO_{4})_{3}·6H_{2}O is a commonly used crystalline form.

In dilute aqueous solution, Dy^{3+} is strongly hydrated, while perchlorate behaves mainly as a weakly coordinating counterion.

Raman-spectroscopic studies of aqueous dysprosium perchlorate solutions support an inner hydration shell containing approximately eight to nine water molecules around Dy^{3+}, with increasing ion pairing only at higher concentrations.

Thermodynamic measurements of aqueous rare-earth perchlorates likewise show that dysprosium perchlorate behaves as a strongly hydrated electrolyte, with non-ideal solution behavior arising from both hydration and ionic association.

== Coordination chemistry ==
Dysprosium perchlorate is used as a soluble source of Dy^{3+} in coordination and materials chemistry.

Reaction of Dy(ClO_{4})_{3}·6H_{2}O with thiocyanate salts and bulky organic cations has been used to prepare anionic dysprosium thiocyanate complexes such as [Dy(SCN)_{8}]^{5−}.

For example, [C_{16}mim]_{5}[Dy(SCN)_{8}] has been prepared from dysprosium perchlorate hexahydrate, an imidazolium thiocyanate and KSCN.

Dysprosium perchlorate has also been used as a starting material for polynuclear Dy(III) coordination polymers exhibiting large magnetocaloric effects and slow magnetic relaxation.

== Safety ==
Dysprosium perchlorate is an oxidizing perchlorate salt and should be kept away from combustible and strongly reducing materials.
