= Ytterbium(II) bromide =

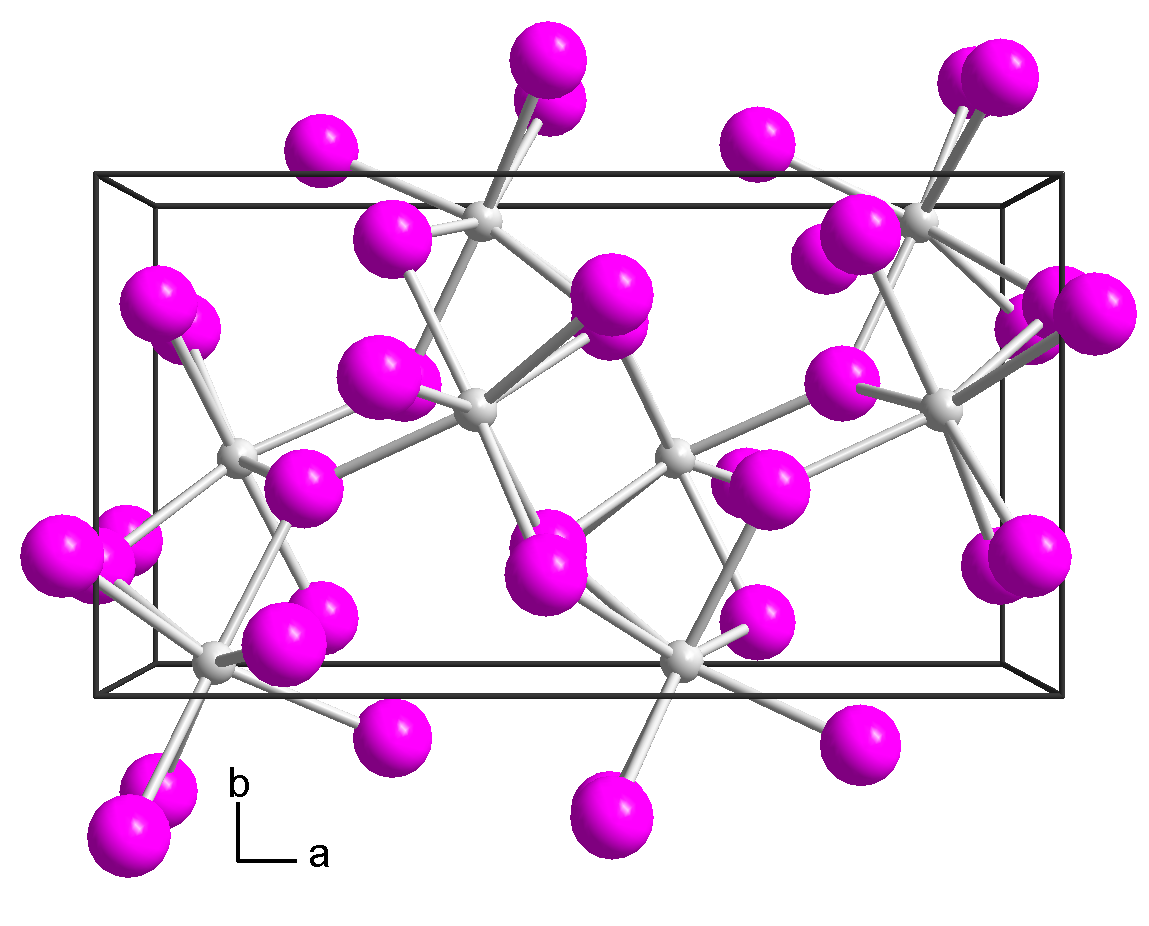

Names
- Other names Ytterbium dibromide

Identifiers
| CAS Number | 25502-05-0 |
| 3D model (JSmol) | Interactive image |
| ChemSpider | 124564 |
| PubChem CID | 57376293 |
| CompTox Dashboard (EPA) | DTXSID20948399 |
- InChI: InChI=1S/2BrH.Yb/h2*1H;/q;;+2/p-2 Key: JLLHSFOQJNVQCV-UHFFFAOYSA-L
- SMILES: [Yb+2].[Br-].[Br-]

Properties
| Chemical formula | Br_{2}Yb |
| Molar mass | 332.853 g·mol^{−1} |
| Appearance | pale yellow solid |
- Except where otherwise noted, data are given for materials in their standard state (at 25 °C [77 °F], 100 kPa). Infobox references

Ytterbium(II) bromide is an inorganic compound with the chemical formula YbBr_{2}.

== Preparation ==
Ytterbium(II) bromide can be produced by the reduction reaction of ytterbium(III) bromide and hydrogen at 500~600 °C:

2 YbBr_{3} + H_{2} → 2 YbBr_{2} + 2 HBr

The ammonia compound can be obtained by reacting metallic ytterbium and ammonium bromide in liquid ammonia at −78 °C. The ammonia compound can be decomposed in high vacuum at 200 °C to obtain ytterbium(II) bromide:

Yb + 2 NH_{4}Br → YbBr_{2} + 2 NH_{3} + H_{2}

Ytterbium(II) bromide can also be prepared by comproportionation of metallic ytterbium and ytterbium(III) bromide in a vacuum at 960 °C:

Yb + 2 YbBr_{3} → 3 YbBr_{2}

== Properties ==
Ytterbium(II) bromide is a light yellow solid and is highly hygroscopic. It can only be stored in an inert atmosphere or high vacuum. It is unstable in air or moisture and rapidly converts to the oxybromide and releases hydrogen gas. Ytterbium(II) bromide belongs to the orthorhombic crystal system, with SrI_{2} structure and space group Pbca, or CaCl_{2} structure and space group Pnnm. Its unit cell parameters are a=6.63 Å, b=6.93 Å, c=4.47Å.
