= Dysprosium disilicide =

Names
- Other names Dysprosium silicide, dysprosium(II) silicide

Identifiers
CAS Number	12133-07-2
3D model (JSmol)	Interactive image
ChemSpider	129556531
ECHA InfoCard	100.031.994
EC Number	235-207-7
PubChem CID	170843540
CompTox Dashboard (EPA)	DTXSID601310103
- InChI: InChI=1S/Dy.2Si Key: PEGILKWBIXTZFZ-UHFFFAOYSA-N
- SMILES: [Si].[Si].[Dy]

Properties
Chemical formula	DySi_{2}
Molar mass	218.670 g·mol^{−1}
Appearance	Dark gray crystals
Density	5.2 g/cm^{3}
Melting point	1,550 °C (2,820 °F; 1,820 K)
Solubility in water	insoluble

Structure
Crystal structure	Orthorhombic
- Except where otherwise noted, data are given for materials in their standard state (at 25 °C [77 °F], 100 kPa). Infobox references

Dysprosium disilicide is a binary inorganic compound of dysprosium and silicon with the chemical formula DySi_{2}.

== Physical properties ==
Dysprosium disilicide forms dark gray crystals of orthorhombic system with cell parameters a = 0.404 nm, b = 0.395 nm, and c = 1.334 nm.

== Chemical properties ==
Dysprosium disilicide is characterized by high corrosion resistance. Eight-hour exposure in boiling water does not give any changes in the weight and appearance of the samples. The compound slowly oxidizes in air at temperatures above 1000 °C.

== Uses ==
DySi_{2} is a promising material for various applications, including advanced electronics, magnetic devices, and high-temperature coatings.
