= Neodymium bromide =

Neodymium bromide may refer to:

- Neodymium(III) bromide (neodymium tribromide), NdBr_{3}
- Neodymium(II) bromide (neodymium dibromide), NdBr_{2}
