= Pyridinium perbromide =

Identifiers
CAS Number	39416-48-3
3D model (JSmol)	Interactive image
ChemSpider	10156304
ECHA InfoCard	100.049.479
EC Number	254-446-8
PubChem CID	11983801
UNII	W0AF353S0O
CompTox Dashboard (EPA)	DTXSID80885771
- InChI: InChI=1S/C5H5N.Br3/c1-2-4-6-5-3-1;1-3-2/h1-5H;/q+1;-1 Key: XGXACOWIBOWGSS-UHFFFAOYSA-N
- SMILES: [n+]1ccccc1.Br[Br-]Br

Properties
Chemical formula	C_{5}H_{6}Br_{3}N
Molar mass	319.822 g·mol^{−1}
Appearance	red crystalline solid
Solubility in water	virtually insoluble
- Except where otherwise noted, data are given for materials in their standard state (at 25 °C [77 °F], 100 kPa). Infobox references

Pyridinium perbromide (also called pyridinium bromide perbromide, pyridine hydrobromide perbromide, or pyridinium tribromide) is an organic chemical composed of a pyridinium cation and a tribromide anion. It can also be considered as a complex containing pyridinium bromide—the salt of pyridine and hydrogen bromide—with an added bromine (Br_{2}). The chemical is a solid whose reactivity is similar to that of bromine. It is thus a strong oxidizing agent used as a source of electrophilic bromine in halogenation reactions. The analogous quinoline compound behaves similarly.

== Preparation ==
Pyridinium tribromide can be obtained by reacting pyridinium bromide with bromine or thionyl bromide.

== Properties ==
Pyridinium tribromide is a red crystalline solid which is virtually insoluble in water.

== Use ==
Pyridinium tribromide is used as a brominating agent of ketones, phenols, and ethers. As a stable solid, it can be more easily handled and weighed precisely, especially important properties for use in small scale reactions. One example from the original publications on this chemical is the bromination of the 3-ketosteroid 1 to 2,4-dibromocholestanone (2):

Bromination of a 3-Ketosteroid.
