= Dysprosium chloride =

Dysprosium chloride may refer to:

- Dysprosium(II) chloride (dysprosium dichloride), DyCl_{2}
- Dysprosium(III) chloride (dysprosium trichloride), DyCl_{3}
