= Holmium(III) hydroxide =

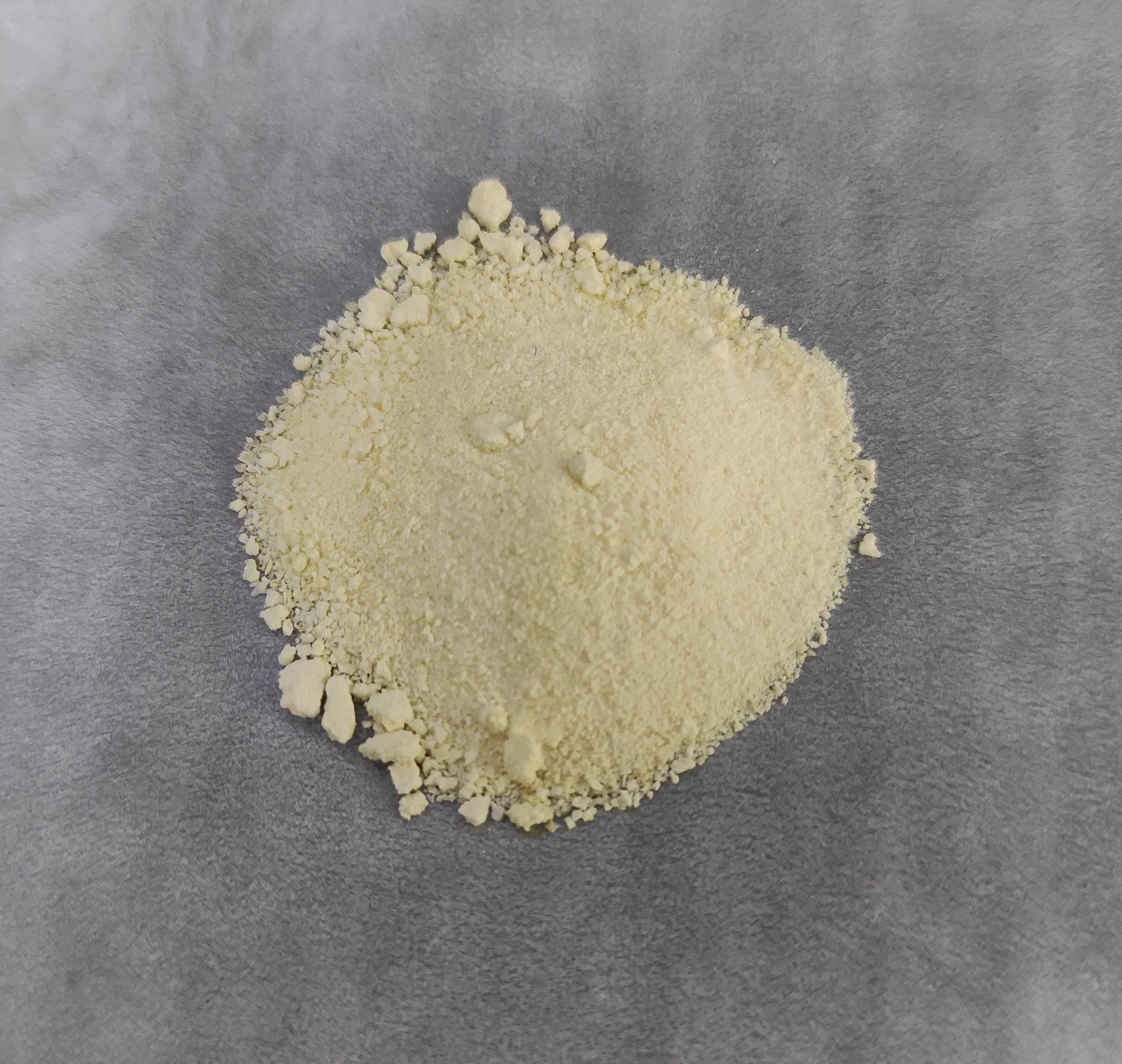
- Holmium(III) hydroxide

Identifiers
CAS Number	12054-57-8
3D model (JSmol)	Interactive image
ChemSpider	9485420
ECHA InfoCard	100.031.814
EC Number	235-009-0
PubChem CID	11310452
CompTox Dashboard (EPA)	DTXSID10923458
- InChI: InChI=1S/Ho.3H2O/h;3*1H2/q+3;;;/p-3 Key: LCTWRNOEZKTLGG-UHFFFAOYSA-K
- SMILES: [Ho+3].[OH-].[OH-].[OH-]

Properties
Chemical formula	Ho(OH)_{3}
Molar mass	215.938541
Appearance	yellow solid

Related compounds
Other anions	holmium oxide
Other cations	dysprosium(III) hydroxide erbium(III) hydroxide
- Except where otherwise noted, data are given for materials in their standard state (at 25 °C [77 °F], 100 kPa). Infobox references

Holmium(III) hydroxide is an inorganic compound with the chemical formula Ho(OH)_{3}.

== Chemical properties ==
Holmium(III) hydroxide reacts with acids to produce holmium(III) salts:

Ho(OH)_{3} + 3 H^{+} → Ho^{3+} + 3 H_{2}O

Holmium(III) hydroxide undergoes thermal decomposition to HoO(OH) at elevated temperatures. Further decomposition at higher temperatures produces Ho_{2}O_{3}.
