= Dysprosium(III) sulfide =

Names
- Other names Didysprosium trisulfide

Identifiers
CAS Number	12133-10-7
3D model (JSmol)	Interactive image
ChemSpider	21248508
ECHA InfoCard	100.031.995
EC Number	235-208-2
PubChem CID	24837760
CompTox Dashboard (EPA)	DTXSID201014282
- InChI: InChI=1S/3Dy.3S/q;2*+3;3*-2 Key: SVCBLQQYIMDMCB-UHFFFAOYSA-N
- SMILES: [Dy+3].[Dy+3].[S-2].[S-2].[S-2]

Properties
Chemical formula	Dy_{2}S_{3}
Molar mass	421.18 g·mol^{−1}
Appearance	brown crystals
Density	6.08 g/cm^{3}
Solubility in water	moderately soluble

Related compounds
Related compounds	Lanthanum(III) sulfide

Hazards
- GHS labelling
Pictograms	(GHS02: Flammable) (GHS07: Exclamation mark)
Signal word	Danger
- Except where otherwise noted, data are given for materials in their standard state (at 25 °C [77 °F], 100 kPa). Infobox references

Dysprosium(III) sulfide is a binary inorganic compound of dysprosium and sulfur with the chemical formula Dy_{2}S_{3}.

== Synthesis ==
Dysprosium(III) sulfide can be produced by treating metallic dysprosium with sulfur:

2Dy + 3S → Dy_{2}S_{3}

Once prepared, dysprosium(III) sulfide can be purified by chemical vapor transport using iodine.

Dysprosium(III) sulfide can also be prepared by treating dysprosium sulfate with hydrogen sulfide at elevated temperatures:

Dy_{2}(SO_{4})_{3} + 12 H_{2}S → Dy_{2}S_{3} + 12 H_{2}O + 12 S

== Physical properties ==
Didysprosium trisulfide forms yellow-orange-brown crystals of two modifications: cubic and monoclinic systems.

There is evidence that Dy_{2}S_{3} forms crystals of brown-red, black, or green color.

The crystals are stable in dry air, but in humid air they are slowly hydrolyzed. The compound is moderately soluble in water and acids.

== Chemical properties ==
Dy_{2}S_{3} oxidizes when strongly heated in air:

Dy_{2}S_{3} + 3O_{2} → Dy_{2}O_{2}S + 2SO_{2}
