= Thulium dibromide =

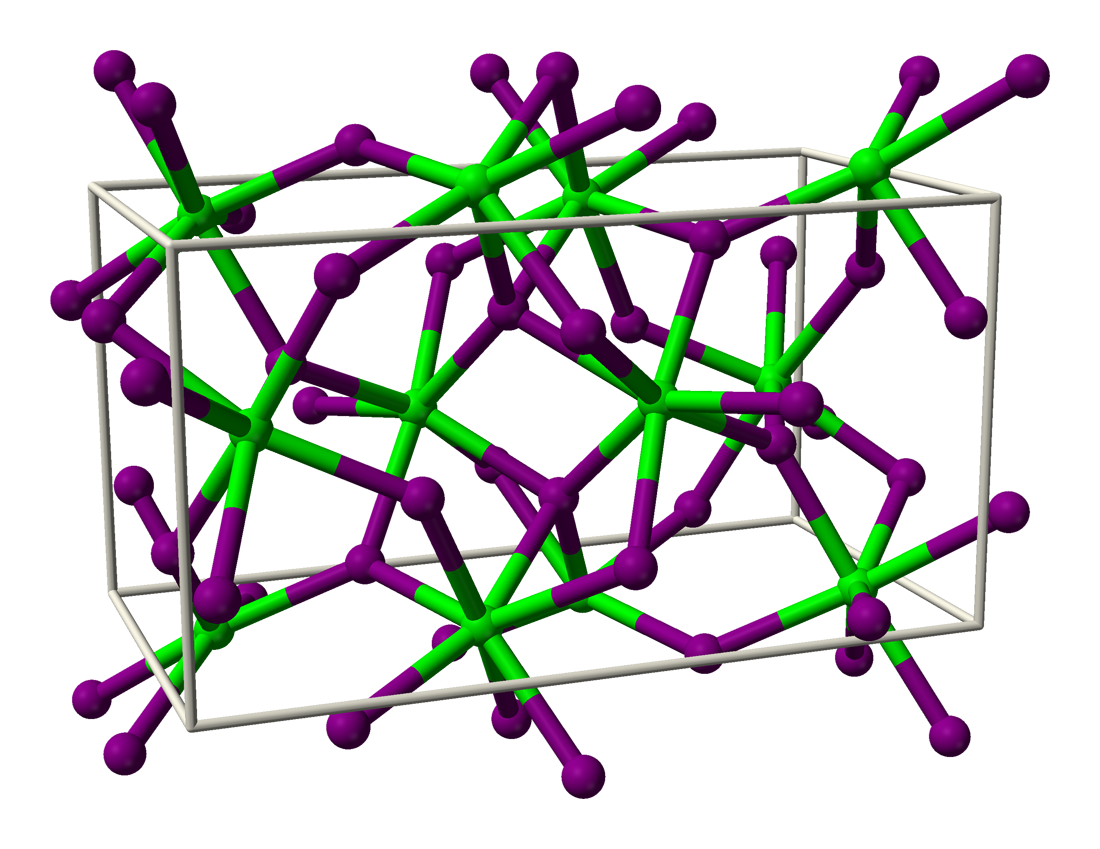

Names
- Other names Thulium(II) bromide

Identifiers
CAS Number	64171-97-7
3D model (JSmol)	Interactive image
- InChI: InChI=1S/2BrH.Tm/h2*1H;/q;;+2/p-2 Key: AZLHTMVBZVOUEC-UHFFFAOYSA-L
- SMILES: [Tm+2].[Br-].[Br-]

Properties
Chemical formula	TmBr_{2}
Molar mass	328.74
Appearance	dark green solid
Melting point	619 °C
- Except where otherwise noted, data are given for materials in their standard state (at 25 °C [77 °F], 100 kPa). Infobox references

Thulium dibromide is an inorganic compound, with the chemical formula of TmBr_{2}. It is a dark green solid that is easy to dissolve, with the SrI_{2} structure and it needs to be stored in an inert atmosphere.

== Preparation ==
Thulium dibromide can be prepared by reacting thulium with thulium tribromide at 800~900 °C in a vacuum. At high temperatures, the alkali metals can also obtain bromide, but only lithium and sodium reactions obtain thulium dibromide, and the response to the participation of potassium, rubidium, and caesium.
