= Dysprosium(III) chloride =

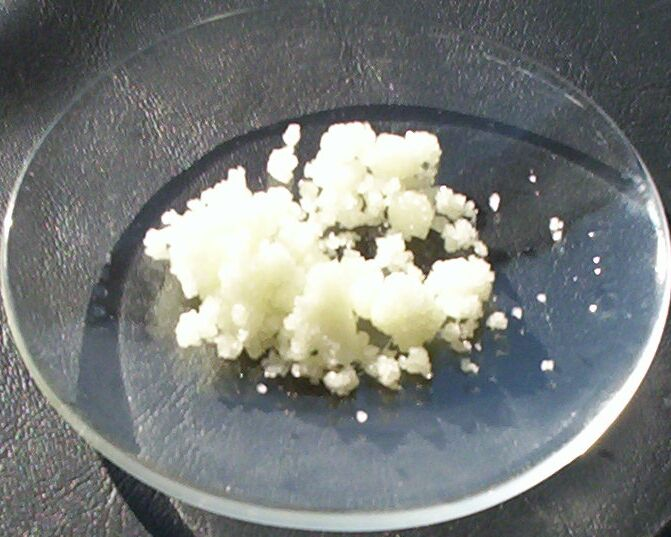
- Dysprosium(III) chloride hexahydrate

Names
- IUPAC names Dysprosium(III) chloride Dysprosium trichloride

Identifiers
| CAS Number | 10025-74-8 |
| 3D model (JSmol) | Interactive image |
| ChemSpider | 59592 |
| ECHA InfoCard | 100.030.024 |
| PubChem CID | 66207 |
| UNII | Q2A03W637H |
| CompTox Dashboard (EPA) | DTXSID8041909 |
- InChI: InChI=1S/3ClH.Dy/h3*1H;/q;;;+3/p-3 Key: BOXVSFHSLKQLNZ-UHFFFAOYSA-K; InChI=1/3ClH.Dy/h3*1H;/q;;;+3/p-3 Key: BOXVSFHSLKQLNZ-DFZHHIFOAK
- SMILES: Cl[Dy](Cl)Cl

Properties
| Chemical formula | DyCl_{3} |
| Molar mass | 268.86 g/mol (anhydrous) |
| Appearance | white solid |
| Density | 3.67 g/cm^{3}, solid |
| Melting point | 647 °C (1,197 °F; 920 K) (anhydrous) |
| Boiling point | 1,530 °C (2,790 °F; 1,800 K) |
| Solubility in water | Soluble |

Structure
| Crystal structure | AlCl_{3} structure |
| Coordination geometry | Octahedral |

Hazards
- GHS labelling
| Pictograms | (GHS07: Exclamation mark) |
| Signal word | Warning |
| Hazard statements | H315, H319, H335 |
| Precautionary statements | P302+P352, P305+P351+P338 |
| Flash point | Non-flammable |

Related compounds
| Other anions | Dysprosium(III) fluoride Dysprosium(III) bromide Dysprosium(III) iodide Dysprosium(III) oxide |
| Other cations | Terbium(III) chloride Dysprosium(II) chloride Holmium(III) chloride |
| Related compounds | Dysprosium(II) chloride |
- Except where otherwise noted, data are given for materials in their standard state (at 25 °C [77 °F], 100 kPa). verify (what is ?) Infobox references

Dysprosium(III) chloride (DyCl_{3}), also known as dysprosium trichloride, is a compound of dysprosium and chlorine. It is a white to yellow solid which rapidly absorbs water on exposure to moist air to form a hexahydrate, DyCl_{3}·6H_{2}O. Simple rapid heating of the hydrate causes partial hydrolysis to an oxychloride, DyOCl.

== Preparation and reactions ==
DyCl_{3} is often prepared by the "ammonium chloride route", starting from either Dy_{2}O_{3} or the hydrated chloride DyCl_{3}·6H_{2}O. These methods produce (NH_{4})_{2}[DyCl_{5}]:

10 NH_{4}Cl + Dy_{2}O_{3} → 2 (NH_{4})_{2}[DyCl_{5}] + 6 NH_{3} + 3 H_{2}O

DyCl_{3}·6H_{2}O + 2 NH_{4}Cl → (NH_{4})_{2}[DyCl_{5}] + 6 H_{2}O

The pentachloride decomposes thermally according to the following equation:

(NH_{4})_{2}[DyCl_{5}] → 2 NH_{4}Cl + DyCl_{3}

The thermolysis reaction proceeds via the intermediacy of (NH_{4})[Dy_{2}Cl_{7}].

Treating Dy_{2}O_{3} with aqueous HCl produces the hydrated chloride DyCl_{3}·6H_{2}O, which cannot be rendered anhydrous by heating. Instead one obtains an oxychloride:

DyCl_{3} + H_{2}O → DyOCl + 2 HCl

Dysprosium(III) chloride is a moderately strong Lewis acid, which ranks as "hard" according to the HSAB concept. Aqueous solutions of dysprosium chloride can be used to prepare other dysprosium(III) compounds, for example dysprosium(III) fluoride:

DyCl_{3} + 3 NaF → DyF_{3} + 3 NaCl

== Uses ==
Dysprosium(III) chloride can be used as a starting point for the preparation of other dysprosium salts. Dysprosium metal is produced when a molten mixture of DyCl_{3} in eutectic LiCl-KCl is electrolysed. The reduction occurs via Dy^{2+}, at a tungsten cathode.

== Precautions ==
Dysprosium compounds are believed to be of low to moderate toxicity, although their toxicity has not been investigated in detail.
