= Neodymium(II) bromide =

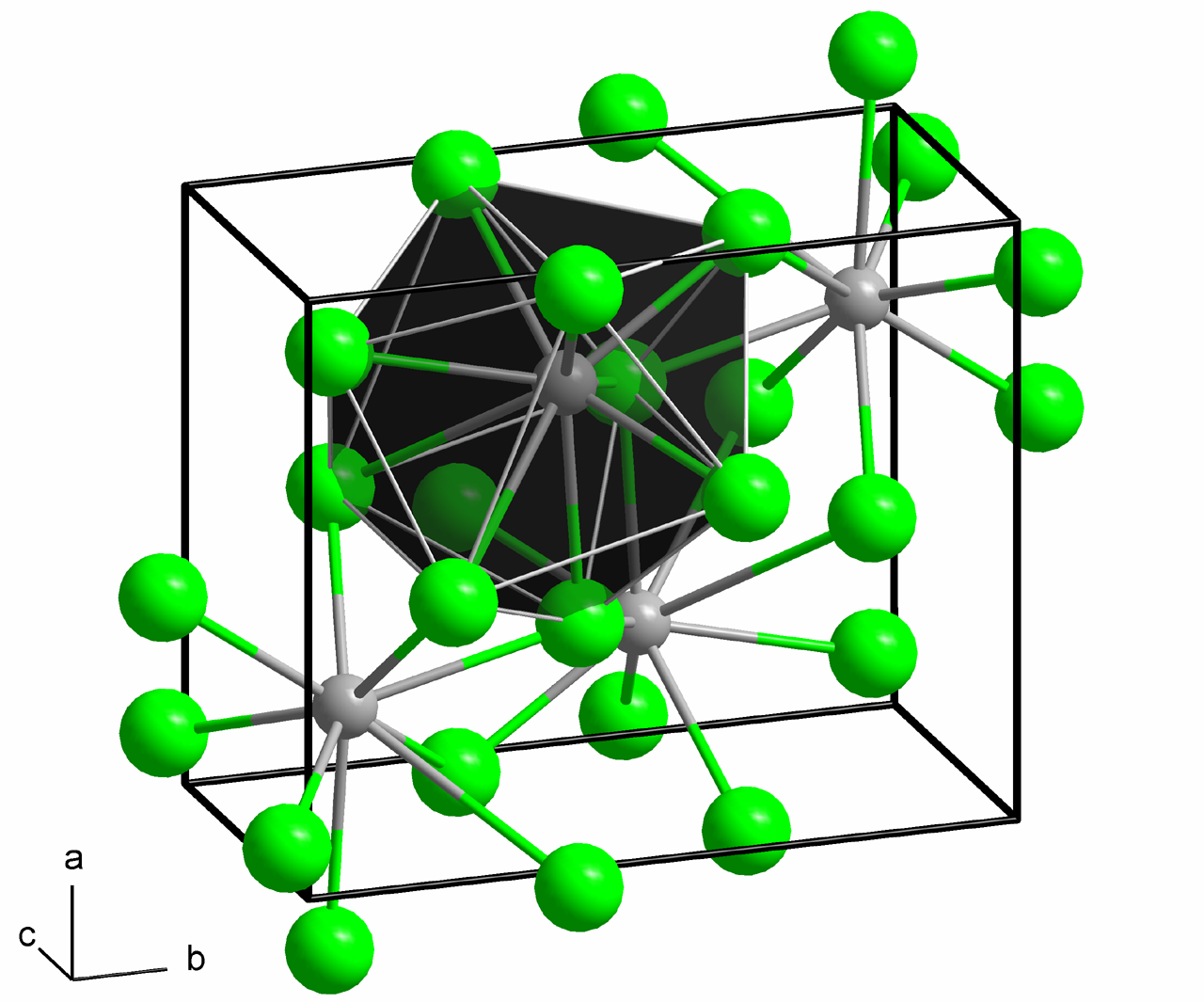

Names
- IUPAC name Neodymium(II) bromide
- Other names: Neodymium dibromide; Neodymium bromide

Identifiers
CAS Number	59325-04-1
3D model (JSmol)	Interactive image
- InChI: InChI=1S/2BrH.Nd/h2*1H;/q;;+2/p-2 Key: SNPAAONOVANSBU-UHFFFAOYSA-L
- SMILES: [Br-].[Br-].[Nd+2]

Properties
Chemical formula	NdBr_{2}
Molar mass	304.05 g/mol
Appearance	Green solid
Melting point	725 °C (1,337 °F; 998 K)

Related compounds
Other anions	Neodymium(II) fluoride, Neodymium(II) chloride, Neodymium(II) iodide
Other cations	Praseodymium(II) bromide, Cerium(II) bromide, Samarium(II) bromide
Related compounds	Lead(II) chloride, Neodymium(III) bromide
- Except where otherwise noted, data are given for materials in their standard state (at 25 °C [77 °F], 100 kPa). Infobox references

Neodymium(II) bromide is an inorganic compound of neodymium and bromide.

== Preparation ==
Neodymium(II) bromide can be obtained via the reduction of neodymium(III) bromide with neodymium in a vacuum at 800 to 900 °C.

Nd + 2 NdBr_{3} → 3 NdBr_{2}

== Properties ==
Neodymium(II) bromide is a dark green solid. The compound is extremely hygroscopic and can only be stored and handled under carefully dried inert gas or under a high vacuum. In air or on contact with water, it converts to hydrates by absorbing moisture, but these are unstable and more or less rapidly transform into oxybromides with evolution of hydrogen. The compound has the same crystal structure as lead(II) chloride type.
