= Holmium(III) bromide =

Names
- IUPAC name Holmium(III) bromide
- Other names Holmium tribromide

Identifiers
CAS Number	13825-76-8
3D model (JSmol)	Interactive image
ChemSpider	75581
ECHA InfoCard	100.034.099
EC Number	237-524-6
PubChem CID	25212324
UNII	BFW34L0Q59
UN number	12141606
CompTox Dashboard (EPA)	DTXSID4065658
- InChI: InChI=1S/3BrH.Ho/h3*1H;/q;;;+3/p-3 Key: MZNSYJWLQLXLHE-UHFFFAOYSA-K
- SMILES: Br[Ho](Br)B

Properties
Chemical formula	Br_{3}Ho
Molar mass	404.64
Appearance	Yellow Crystalline Solid
Density	4.85 g/cm^{3}
Melting point	919 °C (1,686 °F; 1,192 K)
Boiling point	1,470 °C (2,680 °F; 1,740 K)
Solubility in water	Will dissolve
log P	2.53680

Thermochemistry
Std enthalpy of formation (Δ_{f}H^{⦵}_{298})	50.1 kJ/mol

Hazards
- Occupational safety and health (OHS/OSH)
Main hazards	Irritant to eyes, and skin, and internal organs.
- GHS labelling
Pictograms	(GHS07: Exclamation mark)
Signal word	Warning
Hazard statements	H315, H319, H335
Precautionary statements	P261, P305+P351+P338P271, P280, P302+P352, P304+P340, P362, P403+P233P405, P501<
NFPA 704 (fire diamond)	2 0 0
- Except where otherwise noted, data are given for materials in their standard state (at 25 °C [77 °F], 100 kPa). Infobox references

Holmium(III) bromide refers to the inorganic compound HoBr_{3} and its hydrate HoBr_{3}(H_{2}O)_{8}. It can be prepared by heating holmium oxide with excess ammonium bromide under an atmosphere of hydrogen bromide.

== See also ==
- Lanthanide tribromide
