= Dysprosium bromide =

Dysprosium bromide may refer to:

- Dysprosium(II) bromide (dysprosium dibromide), TmBr_{2}
- Dysprosium(III) bromide (dysprosium tribromide), TmBr_{3}
