= Dysprosium(III) hydroxide =

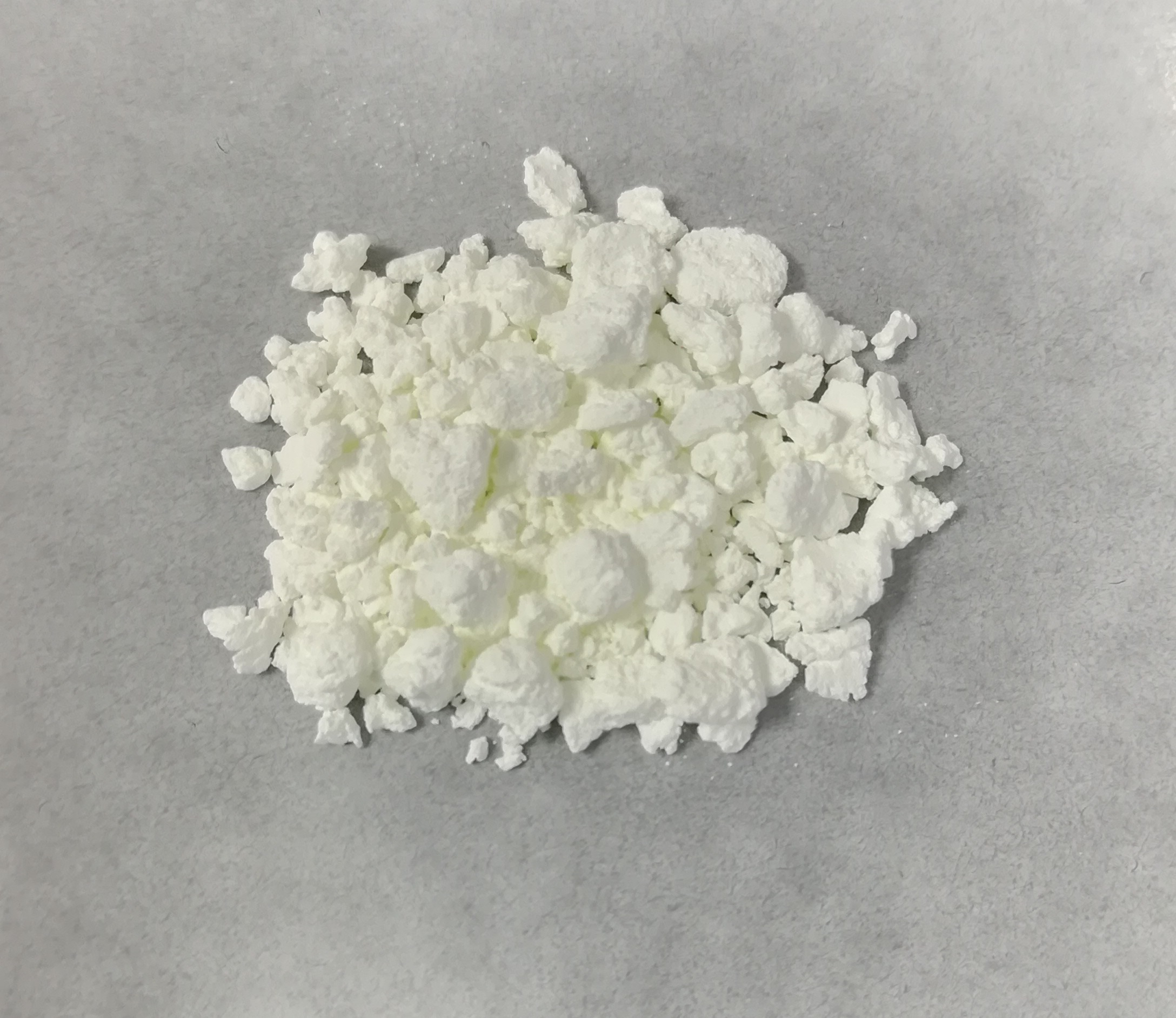

Identifiers
CAS Number	1308-85-6
3D model (JSmol)	Interactive image
ChemSpider	144480
ECHA InfoCard	100.013.785
EC Number	215-163-5
PubChem CID	164807
CompTox Dashboard (EPA)	DTXSID501315231
- InChI: InChI=1S/Dy.3H2O/h;3*1H2/q+3;;;/p-3 Key: ABEVUBXCYLEFPJ-UHFFFAOYSA-K
- SMILES: [Dy+3].[OH-].[OH-].[OH-]

Properties
Chemical formula	Dy(OH)_{3}
Molar mass	213.524
Appearance	yellow solid

Related compounds
Other anions	dysprosium oxide
Other cations	terbium(III) hydroxide holmium(III) hydroxide
- Except where otherwise noted, data are given for materials in their standard state (at 25 °C [77 °F], 100 kPa). Infobox references

Dysprosium(III) hydroxide is an inorganic compound with the chemical formula Dy(OH)_{3}.

== Chemical properties ==
Dysprosium(III) hydroxide reacts with acids and produces dysprosium(III) salts:

Dy(OH)_{3} + 3 H^{+} → Dy^{3+} + 3 H_{2}O

Dysprosium(III) hydroxide decomposes to DyO(OH) at elevated temperatures. Further decomposition produces Dy_{2}O_{3}. The reactions are:

Dy(OH)_{3} → [_{299.8} °C] DyOOH + H_{2}O
2 DyOOH → [_{386.6} °C] Dy_{2}O_{3} + H_{2}O
