= Ytterbium(III) bromide =

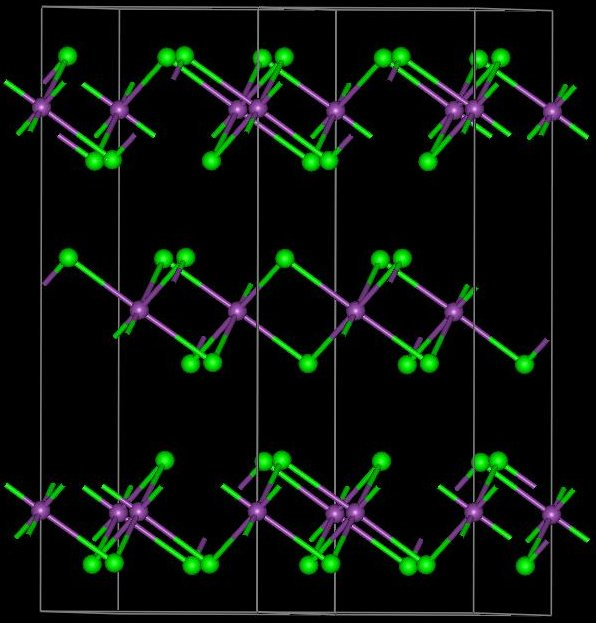
- Ytterbium(III) bromide

Names
- Other names Ytterbium tribromide

Identifiers
CAS Number	13759-89-2
3D model (JSmol)	Interactive image
ChemSpider	75530
ECHA InfoCard	100.033.940
EC Number	237-350-0
PubChem CID	83708
CompTox Dashboard (EPA)	DTXSID8065610
- InChI: InChI=1S/3BrH.Yb/h3*1H;/q;;;+3/p-3 Key: QNLXXQBCQYDKHD-UHFFFAOYSA-K; InChI=1/3BrH.Yb/h3*1H;/q;;;+3/p-3 Key: QNLXXQBCQYDKHD-DFZHHIFOAH
- SMILES: Br[Yb](Br)Br

Properties
Chemical formula	YbBr_{3}
Molar mass	412.77 g/mol
Appearance	white crystalline
Melting point	677 °C (1,251 °F; 950 K)
Boiling point	1,800 °C (3,270 °F; 2,070 K)

Structure
Crystal structure	Trigonal, hR24
Space group	R-3, No. 148

Hazards
- GHS labelling
Pictograms	(GHS07: Exclamation mark)
Signal word	Warning
Hazard statements	H315, H319, H335
Precautionary statements	P261, P264, P271, P280, P302+P352, P304+P340, P305+P351+P338, P312, P332+P313, P337+P313, P362, P403+P233, P405, P501
NFPA 704 (fire diamond)	1
- Except where otherwise noted, data are given for materials in their standard state (at 25 °C [77 °F], 100 kPa). verify (what is ?) Infobox references

Ytterbium(III) bromide is an inorganic chemical compound with the formula YbBr_{3}. It exists in the anhydrous solid. From aqueous solution, a hydrated form crystallizes [Yb(H_{2}O)_{8}]Br_{3}.

== Preparation ==
Dissolving ytterbium oxide into 40% hydrobromic acid forms YbBr_{3}·6H_{2}O crystals. After mixing the hydrate with ammonium bromide and heating it in a vacuum, anhydrous YbBr_{3} can be obtained.

Yb_{2}O_{3} + 6 HBr → 2 YbBr_{3} + 3 H_{2}O

Ytterbium(III) bromide can also be prepared by directly heating ytterbium oxide and ammonium bromide.

== See also ==
- Lanthanide tribromide
