= Samarium bromide =

Samarium bromide may refer to:

- Samarium(II) bromide (samarium dibromide), SmBr_{2}
- Samarium(III) bromide (samarium tribromide), SmBr_{3}
