= Guanidinium carbonate =

Names
- Other names: Bisguanidinium carbonate; Diguanidinium carbonate; Guanidine carbonate

Identifiers
CAS Number	593-85-1
3D model (JSmol)	Interactive image
ChEMBL	ChEMBL3187576
ChemSpider	11160
ECHA InfoCard	100.008.923
EC Number	209-813-7
PubChem CID	11650
UNII	V3394X3G2W
CompTox Dashboard (EPA)	DTXSID0029189
- InChI: InChI=1S/2CH5N3.CH2O3/c3*2-1(3)4/h2*(H5,2,3,4);(H2,2,3,4) Key: STIAPHVBRDNOAJ-UHFFFAOYSA-N
- SMILES: C(=N)(N)N.C(=N)(N)N.C(=O)(O)O

Properties
Chemical formula	C_{3}H_{12}N_{6}O_{3}
Molar mass	180.168 g·mol^{−1}
Appearance	White solid
Density	1.24 g/cm^{3}
Melting point	250 °C (482 °F; 523 K) (decomposes)

Structure
Crystal structure	tetragonal
Space group	P4_{1}2_{1}2 (No. 92)
Lattice constant	a = 6.982 Å, c = 19.635 Å
Formula units (Z)	4 units per cell

Hazards
- GHS labelling
Pictograms	(GHS05: Corrosive) (GHS07: Exclamation mark)
Signal word	Danger
Hazard statements	H302, H315, H318, H319, H335, H412
Precautionary statements	P261, P264, P264+P265, P270, P271, P273, P280, P301+P317, P302+P352, P304+P340, P305+P351+P338, P305+P354+P338, P317, P319, P321, P330, P332+P317, P337+P317, P362+P364, P403+P233, P405, P501
- Except where otherwise noted, data are given for materials in their standard state (at 25 °C [77 °F], 100 kPa). Infobox references

Guanidinium carbonate or guanidine carbonate is the carbonate salt of guanidine with the chemical formula [C(NH_{2})_{3}]_{2}CO_{3}. It is a white solid, forming tetragonal crystals exhibiting non-linear optical properties.

== Uses ==
=== Cosmetics ===
It has been used in cosmetic products for permanent hair straightening. The active ingredient, guanidine hydroxide, is formed in situ by the reaction of guanidine carbonate with calcium hydroxide. This formulation causes less irritation to the scalp than products directly containing a strong base such as sodium hydroxide.

=== Materials ===
It is used in polyacrylonitrile (PAN)-based carbon fibers as an accelerator base material, improving the rate of fiber stabilization, fiber density, and tensile strength.

It is used in the preparation of graphitic carbon nitride (g-C_{3}N_{4}) where it acts as an assembly edge terminator, binding to the composite surface to alter its morphology and expose active sites. The synthesis involves a thermal polycondensation method in which melamine, cyanuric acid, and guanidine carbonate are assembled.

=== Organic synthesis ===
Guanidine carbonate derivates are used in the synthesis of 5,5-diphenyl-2-iminohydantoins. The reaction proceeds by the condensation of benzil with guanidine carbonate in ethanolic KOH.

== Reactions ==
Hydrolysis occurs upon heating in aqueous solution, forming urea and ammonium carbonate:

[C(NH_{2})_{3}]_{2}CO_{3} + 2 H_{2}O → 2 CO(NH_{2})_{2} + (NH_{4})_{2}CO_{3}

Guanidine carbonate reacts with ammonium dinitramide to form the energetic material guanidinium dinitramide:

2 NH_{4}N(NO_{2})_{2} + (NH_{2}C(NH_{2})NH_{2})_{2}CO_{3} → 2 NH_{2}C(NH_{2})NH_{2}N(NO_{2})_{2} + (NH_{4})_{2}CO_{3}

It reacts with boric acid to form anhydrous guanidinium tetraborate in a solid-state reaction at 115 °C.

It also forms hydrogen bonded complexes with cyanuric acid.

== Related compounds ==
A guanidinium bicarbonate (C(NH_{2})_{3}HCO_{3}) has been characterized.
