= Dysprosium(III) sulfate =

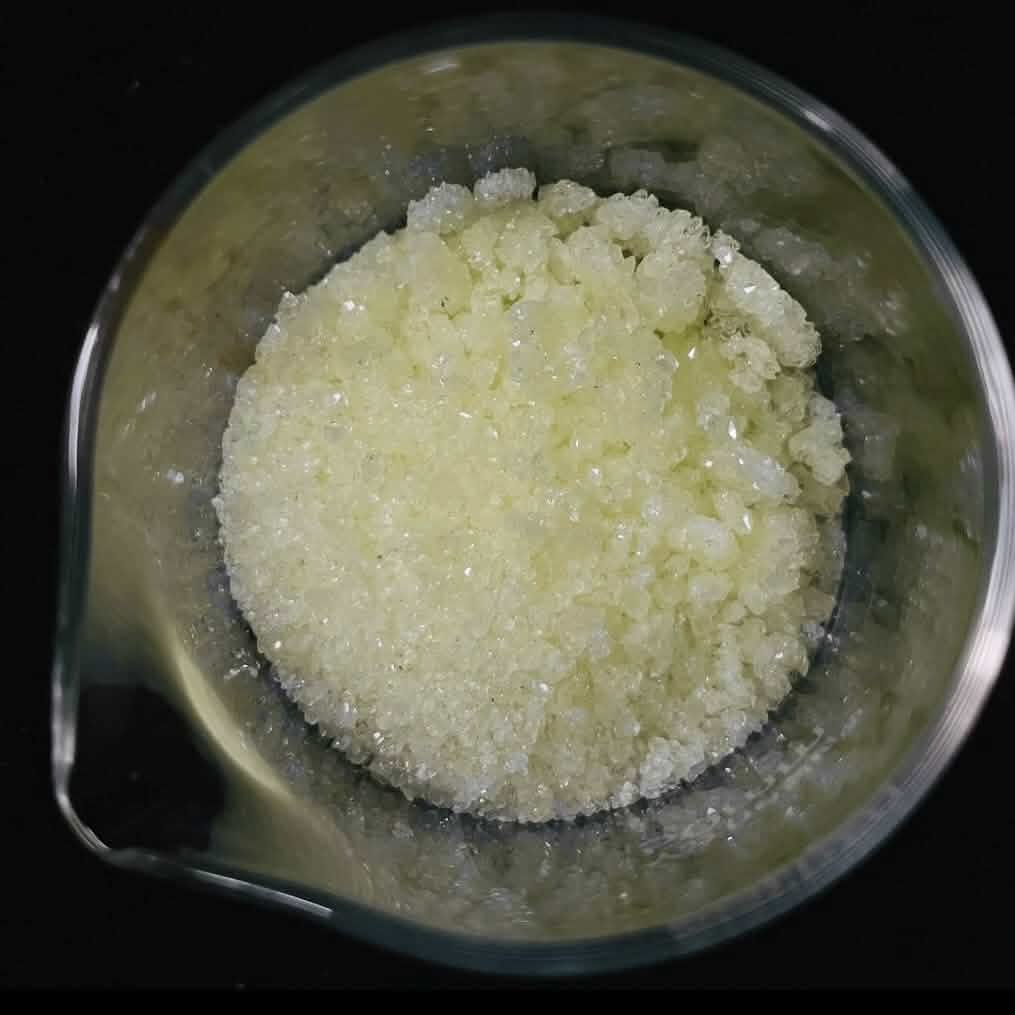
- Octahydrate

Names
- Other names: Didysprosium trisulfate; Dysprosium trisulfate

Identifiers
CAS Number	anhydrous: 14373-91-2; octahydrate: 10031-50-2
3D model (JSmol)	anhydrous: Interactive image; octahydrate: Interactive image
ChemSpider	anhydrous: 146187; octahydrate: 17339949
ECHA InfoCard	100.034.844
EC Number	anhydrous: 238-345-6
PubChem CID	anhydrous: 167079; octahydrate: 16212051
CompTox Dashboard (EPA)	DTXSID00890741
- InChI: anhydrous: InChI=1S/2Dy.3H2O4S/c;;3*1-5(2,3)4/h;;3*(H2,1,2,3,4)/q2*+3;;;/p-6 Key: FLWXWKDFOLALOB-UHFFFAOYSA-H; octahydrate: InChI=1S/2Dy.3H2O4S.8H2O/c;;3*1-5(2,3)4;;;;;;;;/h;;3*(H2,1,2,3,4);8*1H2/q2*+3;;;;;;;;;;;/p-6 Key: NCCPVLRLAAMOQH-UHFFFAOYSA-H
- SMILES: anhydrous: [O-]S(=O)(=O)[O-].[O-]S(=O)(=O)[O-].[O-]S(=O)(=O)[O-].[Dy+3].[Dy+3]; octahydrate: O.O.O.O.O.O.O.O.[O-]S(=O)(=O)[O-].[O-]S(=O)(=O)[O-].[O-]S(=O)(=O)[O-].[Dy+3].[Dy+3]

Properties
Chemical formula	Dy_{2}(SO_{4})_{3}
Molar mass	613.19 g/mol
Appearance	Yellow solid
Solubility in water	Soluble in water

Structure
Crystal structure	monoclinic (octahydrate)
Space group	C2/c (No. 15)
Lattice constant	a = 13.469 Å, b = 6.695 Å, c = 18.202 Å α = 90°, β = 102.06°, γ = 90°
Lattice volume (V)	1605.1 Å^{3}
Formula units (Z)	4

Hazards
- GHS labelling
Pictograms	(GHS07: Exclamation mark)
Signal word	Warning
Hazard statements	H315, H319, H335
Precautionary statements	P261, P264, P271, P280, P302+P352, P304+P340, P305+P351+P338, P319, P321, P332+P317, P337+P317, P362+P364, P403+P233, P405, P501
- Except where otherwise noted, data are given for materials in their standard state (at 25 °C [77 °F], 100 kPa). Infobox references

Dysprosium(III) sulfate is an inorganic compound with the chemical formula Dy_{2}(SO_{4})_{3}. It commonly crystallizes from aqueous solution as the yellow octahydrate, Dy_{2}(SO_{4})_{3}·8H_{2}O.

== Preparation ==
Dysprosium(III) sulfate can be prepared by dissolving dysprosium(III) oxide in sulfuric acid:

Dy_{2}O_{3} + 3 H_{2}SO_{4} → Dy_{2}(SO_{4})_{3} + 3 H_{2}O

Crystallization from aqueous solution gives the octahydrate. The anhydrous form can be obtained by heating the hydrate to about 360 °C.

== Properties ==
Dysprosium(III) sulfate octahydrate crystallizes in the monoclinic crystal system, in space group C2/c (No. 15), with four formula units per unit cell. Its lattice parameters at room temperature are a = 13.469 Å, b = 6.695 Å, c = 18.202 Å and β = 102.06°.

Like other heavy rare-earth sulfates, dysprosium(III) sulfate exhibits retrograde solubility, with its solubility in water decreasing as temperature increases. Measurements between 25 and 95 °C found the octahydrate to be the equilibrium solid phase throughout this temperature range.

In sulfuric acid solutions, the solubility initially increases with acid concentration and passes through a maximum, behaviour attributed to sulfate–bisulfate equilibria and sulfate complex formation.

=== Thermal decomposition ===
On heating, dysprosium(III) sulfate octahydrate loses its water of crystallization in stages to form anhydrous Dy_{2}(SO_{4})_{3}.

Further heating gives different products depending on the atmosphere. Under a reducing carbon monoxide atmosphere, dysprosium oxysulfide, Dy_{2}O_{2}S, forms at about 1150 K. In air, dysprosium oxysulfate, Dy_{2}O_{2}SO_{4}, is formed at about 1310 K.

The Dy_{2}O_{2}S produced by this route exhibits yellow photoluminescence arising from Dy^{3+} transitions and has been investigated as a phosphor material.

== Related compounds ==
A dysprosium sulfate-based coordination polymer, [((CH_{3})_{2}NH_{2})_{9}Dy_{5}(SO_{4})_{12}]_{n}, has been characterized by single-crystal X-ray diffraction. It is of research interest as a proton-conducting material.

A hydroxysulfate (Dy_{4}(OH)_{4}(SO_{4})_{4}(H_{2}O)_{3}) and ethylsulfate (Dy(C_{2}H_{5}SO_{4})_{3}·9H_{2}O) have also been characterized.
