= Lutetium(III) bromide =

Identifiers
| CAS Number | 14456-53-2 |
| 3D model (JSmol) | Interactive image |
| ChemSpider | 76184 |
| ECHA InfoCard | 100.034.935 |
| EC Number | 238-446-5 |
| PubChem CID | 84455 |
| CompTox Dashboard (EPA) | DTXSID40932336 |
- InChI: InChI=1S/3BrH.Lu/h3*1H;/q;;;+3/p-3 Key: DWHGOINJUKABSY-UHFFFAOYSA-K
- SMILES: [Lu+3].[Br-].[Br-].[Br-]

Properties
| Chemical formula | LuBr_{3} |
| Molar mass | 414.68 |
| Appearance | White Powder |
| Density | 1.025 |
| Melting point | 1,400 °C (2,550 °F; 1,670 K) |
| Solubility in water | Will dissolve |

Structure
| Crystal structure | Rhombohedric FeCl_{3} like |

Thermochemistry
| Std molar entropy (S^{⦵}_{298}) | 66.9 J/mol K |
| Std enthalpy of formation (Δ_{f}H^{⦵}_{298}) | 48.8 kJ/mol |

Hazards
- GHS labelling
| Pictograms | (GHS07: Exclamation mark) |
| Signal word | Warning |
| Hazard statements | H315, H319, H335 |
| Precautionary statements | P261, P264, P271, P280, P302+P352, P304+P340, P305+P351+P338, P312, P321, P332+P313, P337+P313, P362, P403+P233, P405, P501 |
| NFPA 704 (fire diamond) | 0 |
- Except where otherwise noted, data are given for materials in their standard state (at 25 °C [77 °F], 100 kPa). Infobox references

Lutetium(III) bromide is an inorganic chemical compound with the formula LuBr_{3}. It exists as a colorless anhydrous solid. From aqueous solution, a hydrated form crystallizes [Lu(H_{2}O)_{8}]Br_{3}.

== Properties ==
=== Formation and reactions ===
Lutetium(III) bromide can be synthesized through the following reaction:

2 Lu(s) + 3 Br_{2}(g) → 2 LuBr_{3}(s)

If burned, lutetium(III) bromide may produce hydrogen bromide and metal oxide fumes.

Lutetium(III) bromide reacts to strong oxidizing agents.

== See also ==
- Lanthanide tribromide
