= Europium bromide =

Europium bromide may refer to:

- Europium(II) bromide (europium dibromide), EuBr_{2}
- Europium(III) bromide (europium tribromide), EuBr_{3}
