= Dysprosium(III) bromide =

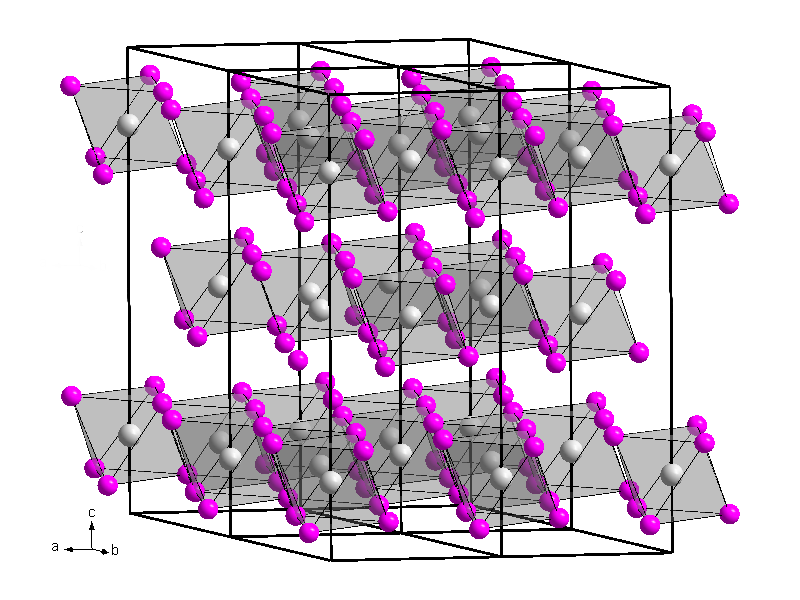

Identifiers
CAS Number	14456-48-5 anhydrous; 14890-43-8 hexahydrate
3D model (JSmol)	Interactive image
ChemSpider	76182
ECHA InfoCard	100.034.933
EC Number	238-443-9
PubChem CID	84453
CompTox Dashboard (EPA)	DTXSID20932334
- InChI: InChI=1S/3BrH.Dy/h3*1H;/q;;;+3/p-3 Key: GBLDKMKYYYAAKD-UHFFFAOYSA-K
- SMILES: [Br-].[Br-].[Br-].[Dy+3]

Properties
Chemical formula	DyBr_{3}
Molar mass	402.212 g·mol^{−1}
Appearance	colourless solid (anhydrous)
Density	5.8 g·cm^{−3}
Melting point	881 °C (1,154 K)
- Except where otherwise noted, data are given for materials in their standard state (at 25 °C [77 °F], 100 kPa). Infobox references

Dysprosium(III) bromide is an inorganic compound of bromine and dysprosium, with the chemical formula of DyBr_{3}. It has a trigonal crystal structure of the bismuth(III) iodide type with space group R3 (No. 148). The hexahydrate is also known, DyBr_{3}(H_{2}O)_{6}.

== Preparation ==
It can be prepared by heating dysprosium oxide with excess ammonium bromide under an atmosphere of hydrogen bromide.

== See also ==
- Lanthanide tribromide
