= Thulium(III) bromide =

Names
- IUPAC name Thulium(III) bromide
- Other names Thulium tribromide

Identifiers
CAS Number	14456-51-0
3D model (JSmol)	Interactive image
ChemSpider	76183
ECHA InfoCard	100.034.934
EC Number	238-444-4
PubChem CID	84454
CompTox Dashboard (EPA)	DTXSID80932335
- InChI: InChI=1S/3BrH.Tm/h3*1H;/q;;;+3/p-3 Key: HQSWGSFQSCMHFQ-UHFFFAOYSA-K
- SMILES: [Tm+3].[Br-].[Br-].[Br-]

Properties
Chemical formula	TmBr_{3}
Molar mass	408.65
Appearance	White crystalline solid
Melting point	952 °C (1,746 °F; 1,225 K)
Boiling point	1,440 °C (2,620 °F; 1,710 K)
Solubility in water	Soluble

Hazards
- GHS labelling
Pictograms	(GHS07: Exclamation mark)
Signal word	Warning
Hazard statements	H315, H319, H335
Precautionary statements	P261, P305+P351+P338 P264, P271, P280, P302+P352, P304+P340, P312, P321, P332+P313, P337+P313, P362, P403+P233, P405, P501
NFPA 704 (fire diamond)	2 0 0
- Except where otherwise noted, data are given for materials in their standard state (at 25 °C [77 °F], 100 kPa). Infobox references

Thulium(III) bromide is an inorganic compound with the formula TmBr_{3}. From aqueous solutions, it crystallizes as the octahydrate [Tm(H_{2}O)_{8}]Br_{3}. Like other lanthanide tribromides, it can be prepared by heating the hydrated bromide with excess ammonium bromide under an atmosphere of hydrogen bromide.
