= Dysprosium(II) chloride =

Names
- IUPAC names Dysprosium(II) chloride Dysprosium dichloride

Identifiers
CAS Number	13767-31-2
3D model (JSmol)	Interactive image
ChemSpider	64878762
PubChem CID	57348181
CompTox Dashboard (EPA)	DTXSID501336879
- InChI: InChI=1S/2ClH.Dy/h2*1H;/p-2 Key: PPMMDKYENGNRPT-UHFFFAOYSA-L
- SMILES: [Cl-].[Cl-].[Dy]

Properties
Chemical formula	DyCl_{2}
Molar mass	233.406 g/mol

Related compounds
Other cations	NdCl_{2}, SmCl_{2}, EuCl_{2}, TmCl_{2}, YbCl_{2}
Related compounds	Dysprosium(III) chloride
- Except where otherwise noted, data are given for materials in their standard state (at 25 °C [77 °F], 100 kPa). Infobox references

Dysprosium(II) chloride (DyCl_{2}), also known as dysprosium dichloride, is an ionic chemical compound of dysprosium and chlorine. This salt is a reduced compound, as the normal oxidation state of dysprosium in dysprosium compounds is +3.

Dysprosium dichloride is glossy black in appearance. The salt is damaged by oxidation on exposure to air. It is an electrical insulator.

The structure is the same as for strontium bromide, ytterbium dichloride, and terbium dichloride. There are two forms. The low temperature form is below 652 °C. It is orthorhombic with unit cell dimensions a=6.69, b=6.76, and c=7.06 Å.

== Preparation ==
Dysprosium dichloride can be prepared by heating molten dysprosium trichloride with dysprosium metal, and rapidly quenching. Molybdenum, niobium or tantalum crucibles are required to avoid alloy formation with the dysprosium.

== Reactions ==
Dysprosium dichloride is capable of reducing titanium dichloride to titanium metal in a potassium chloride, sodium chloride flux.

Ti^{2+} + 2Dy^{2+} → Ti (solid) + 2Dy^{3+}

== Related ==
A ternary dysprosium(II) chloride compound is known with lithium: LiDy_{2}Cl_{5}. This is produced by heating lithium metal and dysprosium trichloride together at 700 °C. This compound is also black. The crystal system of LiDy_{2}Cl_{5} is monoclinic with space group C2/c 4 formulae per unit cell which has dimensions; a = 16.45.6(; b = 6.692; and c = 7.267; with β = 95.79°.
