= Neodymium(III) bromide =

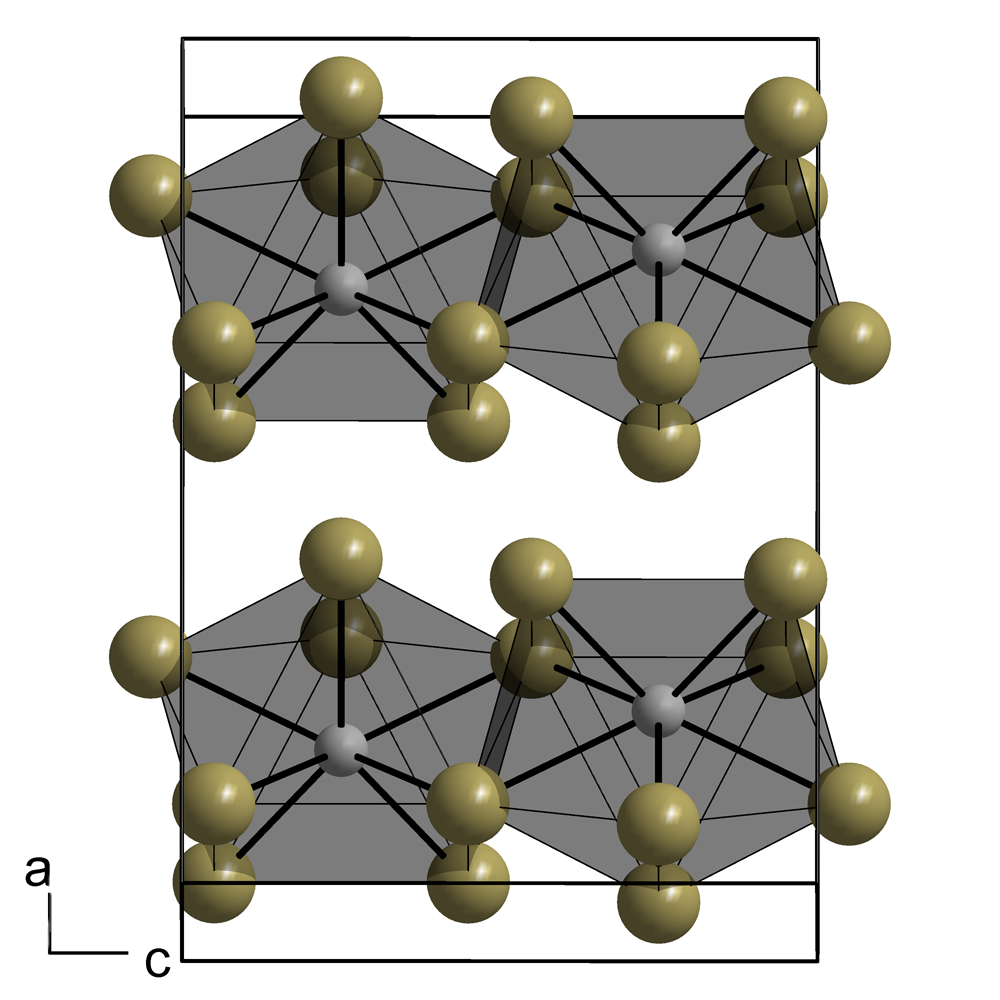

Names
- IUPAC name Neodymium(III) bromide

Identifiers
CAS Number	13536-80-6
3D model (JSmol)	Interactive image
ChemSpider	75394
ECHA InfoCard	100.033.528
EC Number	236-897-2
PubChem CID	83564
CompTox Dashboard (EPA)	DTXSID4065527
- InChI: InChI=1S/3BrH.Nd/h3*1H;/q;;;+3/p-3 Key: LBWLQVSRPJHLEY-UHFFFAOYSA-K
- SMILES: Br[Nd](Br)Br

Properties
Chemical formula	NdBr_{3}
Molar mass	383.95g (anhydrate); 492.05 (hexahydrate)
Appearance	Off-white to pale green powder
Density	5.3 g/cm^{3}
Melting point	684 °C (1,263 °F; 957 K)
Boiling point	1,540 °C (2,800 °F; 1,810 K)

Structure
Crystal structure	Bicapped trigonal prismatic
Coordination geometry	8

Hazards
- GHS labelling
Pictograms	(GHS07: Exclamation mark)
Signal word	Warning
Hazard statements	H315, H319, H335
Precautionary statements	P261, P280, P304+P340, P305+P351+P338, P405, P501
Safety data sheet (SDS)	N-MSDS0052
- Except where otherwise noted, data are given for materials in their standard state (at 25 °C [77 °F], 100 kPa). Infobox references

Neodymium(III) bromide is an inorganic salt of bromine and neodymium the formula NdBr_{3}. The anhydrous compound is an off-white to pale green solid at room temperature, with an orthorhombic PuBr_{3}-type crystal structure. The material is hygroscopic and forms a hexahydrate in water (NdBr_{3}· 6H_{2}O), similar to the related neodymium(III) chloride.

== Preparation ==
The direct reaction of neodymium with bromine can create neodymium(III) bromide:

2Nd + 3Br_{2} → 2NdBr_{3}

In the presence of carbon, neodymium(III) oxide reacts with carbon tetrabromide to produce neodymium(III) bromide.

== Structure ==
Neodymium(III) bromide adopts the plutonium(III) bromide crystal structure. The neodymium ions are 8-coordinate and adopt a bicapped trigonal prismatic geometry. The neodymium–bromine bond lengths are 3.07 Å and 3.09 Å.

== See also ==
- Lanthanide tribromide
