= Dysprosium(III) nitrate =

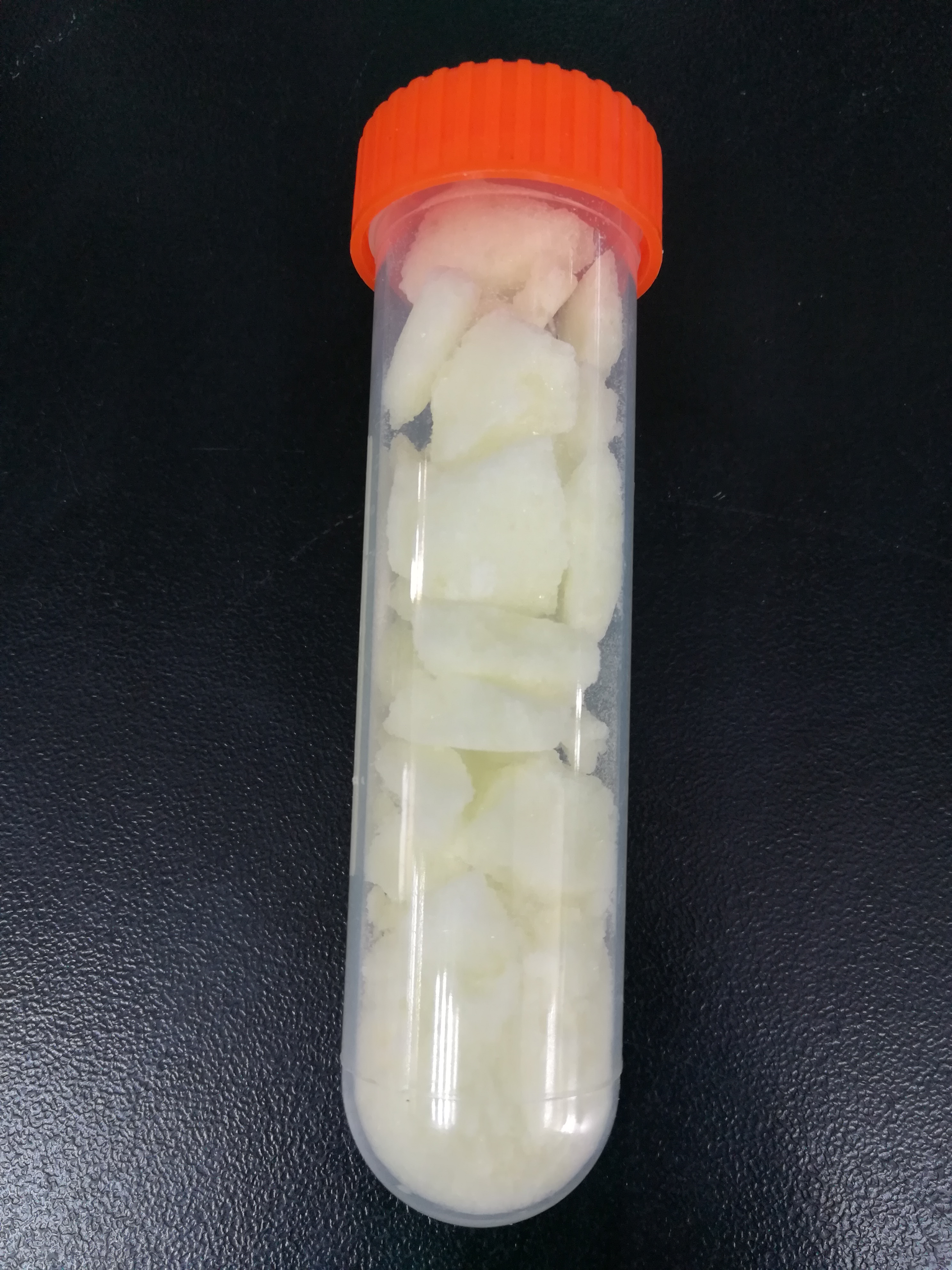

Names
- Other names Dysprosium nitrate, Dysprosium trinitrate

Identifiers
CAS Number	10143-38-1; monhydrate: 100641-13-2; pentahydrate: 10031-49-9; hexahydrate: 35725-30-5
3D model (JSmol)	Interactive image; monhydrate: Interactive image; pentahydrate: Interactive image; hexahydrate: Interactive image
ChemSpider	23375; monhydrate: 26666880; pentahydrate: 21241308; hexahydrate: 186810
ECHA InfoCard	100.030.360
EC Number	233-410-5; pentahydrate: 629-564-1
PubChem CID	25007; monhydrate: 57346095; pentahydrate: 91886635; hexahydrate: 215463
CompTox Dashboard (EPA)	DTXSID60890646; monhydrate: DTXSID80721100; hexahydrate: DTXSID50189253
- InChI: InChI=1S/Dy.3NO3/c;3*2-1(3)4/q+3;3*-1 Key: DVENVBCPDCQQGD-UHFFFAOYSA-N; monhydrate: InChI=1S/Dy.3NO3.H2O/c;3*2-1(3)4;/h;;;;1H2/q+3;3*-1; Key: DSEBQRTVZFLVND-UHFFFAOYSA-N; pentahydrate: InChI=1S/Dy.3NO3.5H2O/c;3*2-1(3)4;;;;;/h;;;;5*1H2/q+3;3*-1;;;;; Key: NOTQUFQJAWMLCE-UHFFFAOYSA-N; hexahydrate: InChI=1S/Dy.3NO3.6H2O/c;3*2-1(3)4;;;;;;/h;;;;6*1H2/q+3;3*-1;;;;;; Key: DCKWZDOAGNMKMX-UHFFFAOYSA-N
- SMILES: O.[Dy+3].[O-][N+]([O-])=O.[O-][N+]([O-])=O.[O-][N+]([O-])=O; monhydrate: [N+](=O)([O-])[O-].[N+](=O)([O-])[O-].[N+](=O)([O-])[O-].O.[Dy+3]; pentahydrate: [N+](=O)([O-])[O-].[N+](=O)([O-])[O-].[N+](=O)([O-])[O-].O.O.O.O.O.[Dy+3]; hexahydrate: [N+](=O)([O-])[O-].[N+](=O)([O-])[O-].[N+](=O)([O-])[O-].O.O.O.O.O.O.[Dy+3]

Properties
Chemical formula	Dy(NO_{3})_{3}
Molar mass	348.51
Appearance	Yellowish crystals
Melting point	88.6 °C (191.5 °F; 361.8 K)
Solubility in water	Soluble

Hazards
- GHS labelling
Pictograms	(GHS03: Oxidizing) (GHS07: Exclamation mark)
Signal word	Warning
Hazard statements	H272, H315, H319, H335
Precautionary statements	P210, P220, P221, P261, P264, P271, P280, P302+P352, P304+P340, P305+P351+P338, P312, P321, P332+P313, P337+P313, P362, P370+P378, P403+P233, P405, P501

Related compounds
Related compounds	Terbium(III) nitrate
- Except where otherwise noted, data are given for materials in their standard state (at 25 °C [77 °F], 100 kPa). Infobox references

Dysprosium(III) nitrate is an inorganic compound, a salt of dysprosium and nitric acid with the chemical formula Dy(NO_{3})_{3}. The compound forms yellowish crystals, dissolves in water, forms a crystalline hydrate.

== Synthesis ==
Anhydrous salt is obtained by the action of nitrogen dioxide on dysprosium(III) oxide:

$$\mathsf{2Dy_2O_3 + 9N_2O_4 \ \xrightarrow{150^oC}\ 4Dy(NO_3)_3 + 6NO }$$

The action of nitrogen dioxide on metallic dysprosium:

$$\mathsf{Dy + 3N_2O_4 \ \xrightarrow{200^oC}\ Dy(NO_3)_3 + 3NO }$$

== Physical properties ==
Dysprosium(III) nitrate forms yellowish crystals.

The anhydrous nitrate forms a crystalline hydrate in wet air with the ideal composition of Dy(NO_{3})_{3}·5H_{2}O, which melts in its own crystallization water at 88.6 °C.

All hydrates (anhydrous, pentahydrate, and hexahydrate) are soluble in water and ethanol, hygroscopic.

== Chemical properties ==
Hydrated dysprosium nitrate thermally decomposes to form DyONO_{3}, and further heating produces dysprosium oxide.

== Application ==
Dysprosium(III) nitrate is used as a catalyst.
