= Dysprosium(III) iodide =

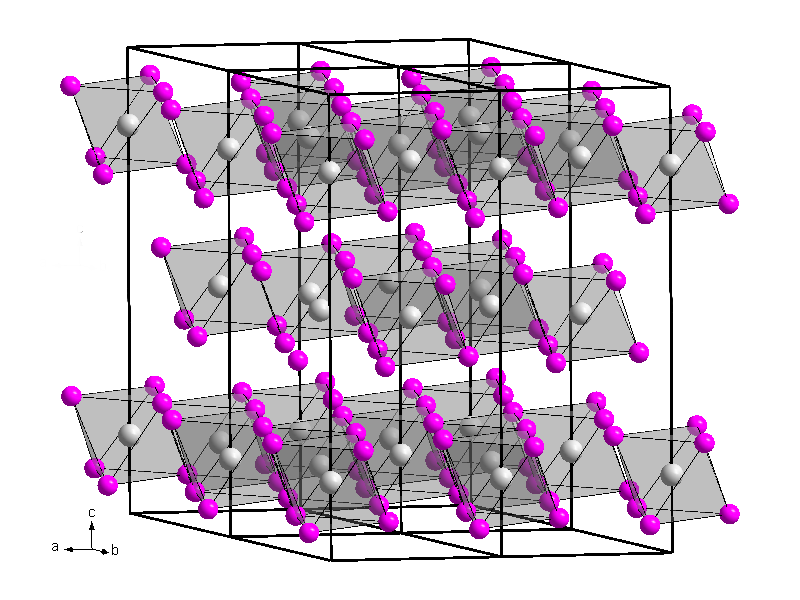

Names
- Other names Dysprosium triiodide, triiododysprosium

Identifiers
CAS Number	15474-63-2
3D model (JSmol)	Interactive image
ChemSpider	76618
ECHA InfoCard	100.035.888
EC Number	239-493-4
PubChem CID	519122
CompTox Dashboard (EPA)	50935055
- InChI: InChI=1S/Dy.3HI/h;3*1H/q+3;;;/p-3 Key: RZQFCZYXPRKMTP-UHFFFAOYSA-K
- SMILES: I[Dy](I)I

Properties
Chemical formula	DyI_{3}
Molar mass	543.213 g·mol^{−1}
Appearance	yellow-green flaky solid
Density	g/cm^{3}
Melting point	955 °C (1,751 °F; 1,228 K)
Boiling point	1,320 °C (2,410 °F; 1,590 K)
Solubility in water	soluble

Structure
Crystal structure	trigonal

Related compounds
Related compounds	Ytterbium(III) iodide

Hazards
- GHS labelling
Pictograms	(GHS08: Health hazard)
- Except where otherwise noted, data are given for materials in their standard state (at 25 °C [77 °F], 100 kPa). Infobox references

Dysprosium(III) iodide is a binary inorganic compound of dysprosium and iodine with the chemical formula DyI_{3}.

== Synthesis ==
Dysprosium(III) iodide can be obtained by reacting dysprosium with iodine.

2Dy + 3I → 2DyI_{3}

Dysprosium(III) iodide can be obtained using the effect of mercury diiodide on dysprosium filings:

2Dy + 3HgI_{2} → 2DyI_{3} + 3Hg

== Physical properties ==
Dysprosium(III) iodide is a hygroscopic yellow-green flaky solid that is soluble in water. The compound has a trigonal crystal structure of the bismuth(III) iodide type with the space group R3.

== Uses ==
Dysprosium(III) iodide is used in gas discharge lamps to generate white light.
