= Dysprosium =

Dysprosium, _{66}Dy
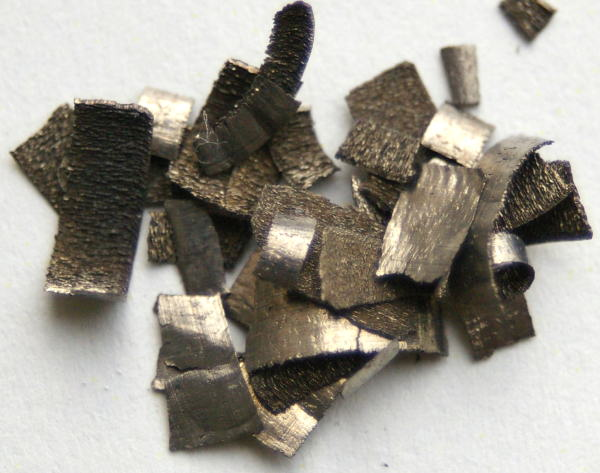

Dysprosium
- Pronunciation: /dɪˈsproʊziəm/ (dih-SPROH-zee-əm)
- Appearance: silvery white

Standard atomic weight A_{r}°(Dy)
- 162.500±0.001; 162.50±0.01 (abridged)

Dysprosium in the periodic table
Hydrogen																															Helium
Lithium	Beryllium																									Boron	Carbon	Nitrogen	Oxygen	Fluorine	Neon
Sodium	Magnesium																									Aluminium	Silicon	Phosphorus	Sulfur	Chlorine	Argon
Potassium	Calcium															Scandium	Titanium	Vanadium	Chromium	Manganese	Iron	Cobalt	Nickel	Copper	Zinc	Gallium	Germanium	Arsenic	Selenium	Bromine	Krypton
Rubidium	Strontium															Yttrium	Zirconium	Niobium	Molybdenum	Technetium	Ruthenium	Rhodium	Palladium	Silver	Cadmium	Indium	Tin	Antimony	Tellurium	Iodine	Xenon
Caesium	Barium	Lanthanum	Cerium	Praseodymium	Neodymium	Promethium	Samarium	Europium	Gadolinium	Terbium	Dysprosium	Holmium	Erbium	Thulium	Ytterbium	Lutetium	Hafnium	Tantalum	Tungsten	Rhenium	Osmium	Iridium	Platinum	Gold	Mercury (element)	Thallium	Lead	Bismuth	Polonium	Astatine	Radon
Francium	Radium	Actinium	Thorium	Protactinium	Uranium	Neptunium	Plutonium	Americium	Curium	Berkelium	Californium	Einsteinium	Fermium	Mendelevium	Nobelium	Lawrencium	Rutherfordium	Dubnium	Seaborgium	Bohrium	Hassium	Meitnerium	Darmstadtium	Roentgenium	Copernicium	Nihonium	Flerovium	Moscovium	Livermorium	Tennessine	Oganesson
–
↑
Dy
↓
Cf
terbium ← dysprosium → holmium
- Atomic number (Z): 66
- Group: f-block groups (no number)
- Period: period 6
- Block: f-block
- Electron configuration: [Xe] 4f^{10} 6s^{2}
- Electrons per shell: 2, 8, 18, 28, 8, 2

Physical properties
- Phase at STP: solid
- Melting point: 1680 K (1407 °C, 2565 °F)
- Boiling point: 2840 K (2562 °C, 4653 °F)
- Density (at 20° C): 8.550 g/cm^{3}
- when liquid (at m.p.): 8.37 g/cm^{3}
- Heat of fusion: 11.06 kJ/mol
- Heat of vaporization: 280 kJ/mol
- Molar heat capacity: 27.7 J/(mol·K)
- Specific heat capacity: 170.462 J/(kg·K)
Vapor pressure
P (Pa)	1	10	100	1 k	10 k	100 k
at T (K)	1378	1523	(1704)	(1954)	(2304)	(2831)

Atomic properties
- Oxidation states: common: +3; 0, +2, +4
- Electronegativity: Pauling scale: 1.22
- Ionization energies: 1st: 573.0 kJ/mol; 2nd: 1130 kJ/mol; 3rd: 2200 kJ/mol
- Atomic radius: empirical: 178 pm
- Covalent radius: 192±7 pm
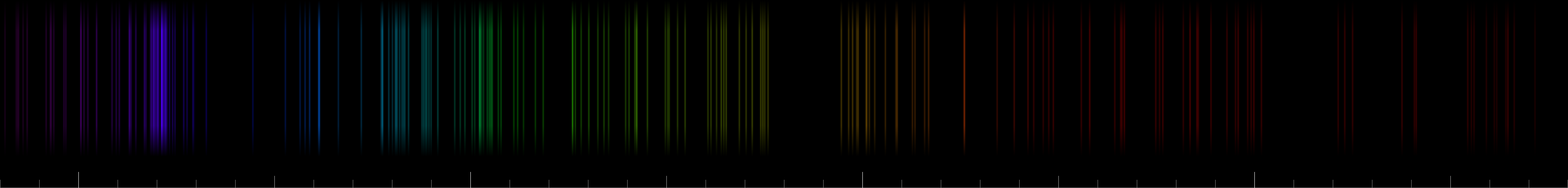
- Spectral lines of dysprosium

Other properties
- Natural occurrence: primordial
- Crystal structure: hexagonal close-packed (hcp) (hP2)
- Lattice constants: a = 359.16 pm c = 565.01 pm (at 20 °C)
- Thermal expansion: poly: 9.9 µm/(m⋅K) (r.t.)
- Thermal conductivity: 10.7 W/(m⋅K)
- Electrical resistivity: α, poly: 926 nΩ⋅m (r.t.)
- Magnetic ordering: paramagnetic at 300 K
- Molar magnetic susceptibility: +103500×10^{−6} cm^{3}/mol (293.2 K)
- Young's modulus: 61.4 GPa
- Shear modulus: 24.7 GPa
- Bulk modulus: 40.5 GPa
- Speed of sound thin rod: 2710 m/s (at 20 °C)
- Poisson ratio: 0.247
- Vickers hardness: 410–550 MPa
- Brinell hardness: 500–1050 MPa
- CAS Number: 7429-91-6

History
- Naming: after Greek δυσπρόσιτος, "hard to get", for requiring 30 attempts to isolate
- Discovery: Lecoq de Boisbaudran (1886)
- First isolation: Georges Urbain (1905)

Isotopes of dysprosium
Main isotopes			Decay	
Isotope	abundance	half-life (t_{1/2})	mode	product
^{154}Dy	extinct	1.40×10^{6} y	α	^{150}Gd
^{156}Dy	0.056%	stable		
^{158}Dy	0.095%	stable		
^{159}Dy	synth	144.4 d	ε	^{159}Tb
^{160}Dy	2.329%	stable		
^{161}Dy	18.889%	stable		
^{162}Dy	25.475%	stable		
^{163}Dy	24.896%	stable		
^{164}Dy	28.260%	stable		
^{165}Dy	synth	2.332 h	β^{−}	^{165}Ho
^{166}Dy	synth	3.40 d	β^{−}	^{166}Ho

Dysprosium is a chemical element; it has symbol Dy and atomic number 66. It is a rare-earth element in the lanthanide series with a metallic silver luster. Dysprosium is never found in nature as a free element, though; like other lanthanides, it is found in various minerals, such as xenotime. Naturally occurring dysprosium is composed of seven isotopes, the most abundant of which is ^{164}Dy.

Dysprosium was first identified in 1886 by Paul Émile Lecoq de Boisbaudran, but it was not isolated in pure form until the development of ion-exchange techniques in the 1950s. Dysprosium is used to produce neodymium-iron-boron (NdFeB) magnets, which are crucial for electric vehicle motors and the efficient operation of wind turbines. It is used for its high thermal neutron absorption cross-section in making control rods in nuclear reactors, for its high magnetic susceptibility (χ_{v} ≈ 5.44×10^{−3}) in data-storage applications, and as a component of Terfenol-D (a magnetostrictive material). Soluble dysprosium salts are mildly toxic, while the insoluble salts are considered non-toxic.

== Characteristics ==
=== Physical properties ===
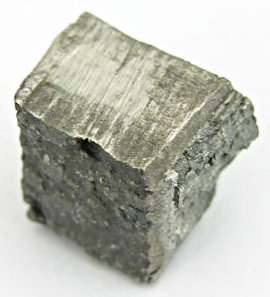
Dysprosium sample

Dysprosium is a rare-earth element and has a metallic, bright silver luster. It is soft and can be machined without sparking if overheating is avoided. Dysprosium's physical characteristics can be greatly affected by even small amounts of impurities.

Dysprosium and holmium have the highest magnetic strengths of the elements, especially at low temperatures. Dysprosium has a simple ferromagnetic ordering at temperatures below its Curie temperature of 90.5 K (−182.7 °C), at which point it undergoes a first-order phase transition from the orthorhombic crystal structure to hexagonal close-packed (hcp). It then has a helical antiferromagnetic state, in which all of the atomic magnetic moments in a particular basal plane layer are parallel and oriented at a fixed angle to the moments of adjacent layers. This unusual antiferromagnetism transforms into a disordered (paramagnetic) state at 179 K (−94 °C). It transforms from the hcp phase to the body-centered cubic phase at 1,654 K (1,381 °C).

=== Chemical properties ===
Dysprosium metal retains its luster in dry air, but it will tarnish slowly in moist air. It burns readily to form dysprosium(III) oxide:

4 Dy + 3 O_{2} → 2 Dy_{2}O_{3}

Dysprosium is quite electropositive and reacts slowly with cold water (and quickly with hot water) to form dysprosium hydroxide:

2 Dy(s) + 6 H_{2}O(l) → 2 Dy(OH)_{3}(aq) + 3 H_{2}(g)

Dysprosium hydroxide decomposes to form DyO(OH) at elevated temperatures, which then decomposes again to dysprosium(III) oxide.

Dysprosium metal vigorously reacts with all the halogens at above 200 °C:

2 Dy(s) + 3 F_{2}(g) → 2 DyF_{3}(s) [green]
2 Dy(s) + 3 Cl_{2}(g) → 2 DyCl_{3}(s) [white]
2 Dy(s) + 3 Br_{2}(l) → 2 DyBr_{3}(s) [white]
2 Dy(s) + 3 I_{2}(g) → 2 DyI_{3}(s) [green]

Dysprosium dissolves readily in dilute sulfuric acid to form solutions containing the yellow Dy(III) ions, which exist as a [Dy(H_{2}O)_{9}]^{3+} complex:

2 Dy(s) + 3 H_{2}SO_{4}(aq) → 2 Dy^{3+}(aq) + 3 SO_{4}^{2−}(aq) + 3 H_{2}(g)

The resulting compound, dysprosium(III) sulfate, is noticeably paramagnetic.

=== Compounds ===
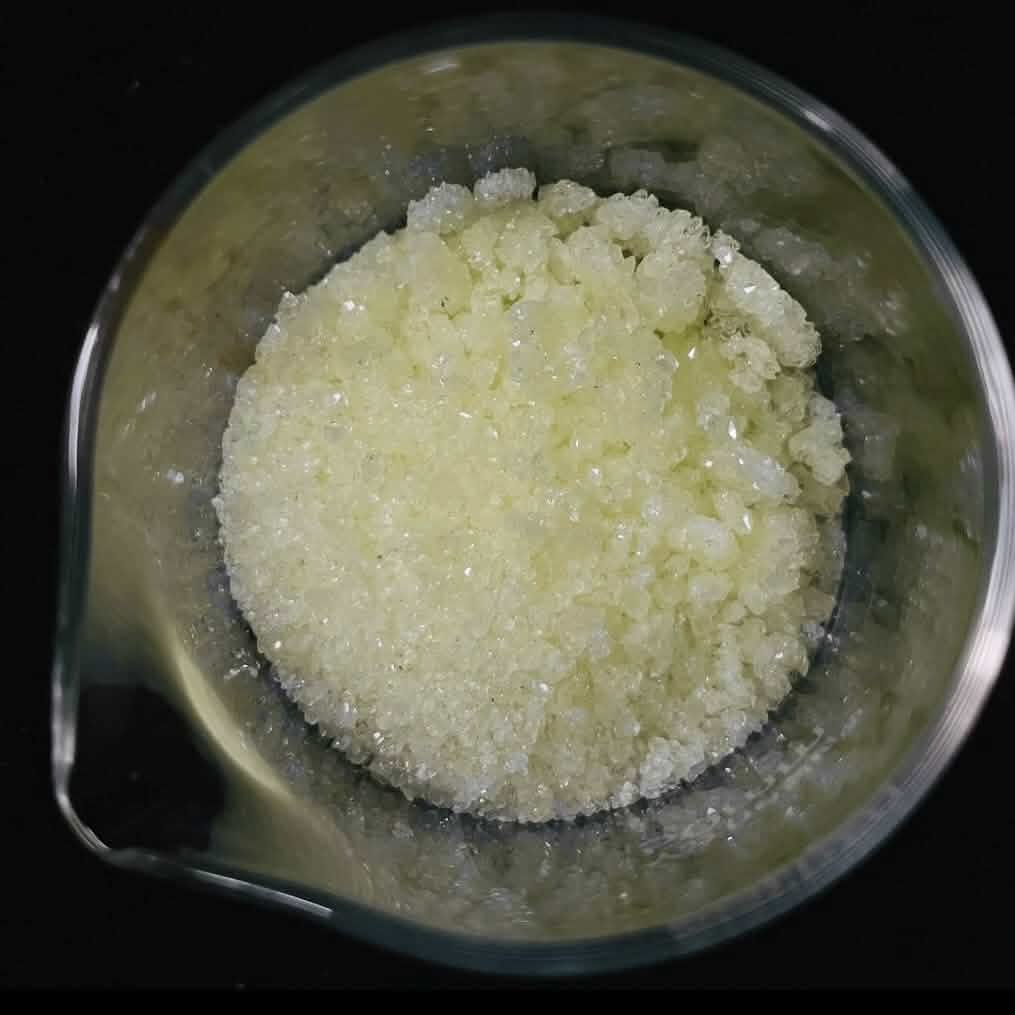
Dysprosium sulfate, Dy_{2}(SO_{4})_{3}

Dysprosium halides, such as DyF_{3} and DyBr_{3}, tend to take on a yellow color. Dysprosium oxide, also known as dysprosia, is a white powder that is highly magnetic, more so than iron oxide.

Dysprosium combines with various non-metals at high temperatures to form binary compounds with varying composition and oxidation states +3 and sometimes +2, such as DyN, DyP, DyH_{2} and DyH_{3}; DyS, DyS_{2}, Dy_{2}S_{3} and Dy_{5}S_{7}; DyB_{2}, DyB_{4}, DyB_{6} and DyB_{12}, as well as Dy_{3}C and Dy_{2}C_{3}.

Dysprosium carbonate, Dy_{2}(CO_{3})_{3}, and dysprosium sulfate, Dy_{2}(SO_{4})_{3}, result from similar reactions. Most dysprosium compounds are soluble in water, though dysprosium carbonate tetrahydrate (Dy_{2}(CO_{3})_{3}·4H_{2}O) and dysprosium oxalate decahydrate (Dy_{2}(C_{2}O_{4})_{3}·10H_{2}O) are both insoluble in water. Two of the most abundant dysprosium carbonates, Dy_{2}(CO_{3})_{3}·2-_{3}H_{2}O (similar to the mineral tengerite-(Y)), and DyCO_{3}(OH) (similar to minerals kozoite-(La) and kozoite-(Nd)), are known to form via a poorly ordered (amorphous) precursor phase with a formula of Dy_{2}(CO_{3})_{3}·4H_{2}O. This amorphous precursor consists of highly hydrated spherical nanoparticles of 10–20 nm diameter that are exceptionally stable under dry treatment at ambient and high temperatures.

Dysprosium forms several intermetallics, including the dysprosium stannides.

=== Isotopes ===
Naturally occurring dysprosium is composed of seven isotopes: ^{156}Dy, ^{158}Dy, ^{160}Dy, ^{161}Dy, ^{162}Dy, ^{163}Dy, and ^{164}Dy. These are all considered stable, although only the last two are theoretically stable: the others can theoretically undergo alpha decay. Of the naturally occurring isotopes, ^{164}Dy is the most abundant at 28%, followed by ^{162}Dy at 26%; the rarest is ^{156}Dy at 0.06%. Dysprosium is the heaviest element to have isotopes that are theoretically stable rather than only observationally stable isotopes that are predicted to be radioactive.

Twenty-nine radioisotopes have been synthesized, ranging in atomic mass from 138 to 173. The most stable of these is ^{154}Dy, with a half-life of 1.40×10^{6} years, followed by ^{159}Dy with a half-life of 144.4 days. As a general rule, isotopes that are lighter than the stable isotopes tend to decay primarily by β^{+} decay, though ^{154}Dy decays by alpha emission and ^{152}Dy and ^{159}Dy only by electron capture, while those that are heavier tend to decay by β^{−} decay. Dysprosium also has at least 11 metastable isomers, ranging in atomic mass from 140 to 165. The most stable of these is ^{165m}Dy, which has a half-life of 1.257 minutes.

== History ==
In 1878, erbium ores were found to contain the oxides of holmium and thulium. French chemist Paul Émile Lecoq de Boisbaudran, while working with holmium oxide, separated dysprosium oxide from it in Paris in 1886. His procedure for isolating the dysprosium involved dissolving dysprosium oxide in acid, then adding ammonia to precipitate the hydroxide. He was only able to isolate dysprosium from its oxide after more than 30 attempts at his procedure. On succeeding, he named the element dysprosium from the Greek dysprositos (δυσπρόσιτος), meaning "hard to get". The element was not isolated in relatively pure form until after the development of ion exchange techniques by Frank Spedding at Iowa State University in the early 1950s.

Due to its role in permanent magnets used for wind turbines, it has been argued that dysprosium will be one of the main objects of geopolitical competition in a world running on renewable energy. But this perspective has been criticised for failing to recognise that most wind turbines do not use permanent magnets and for underestimating the power of economic incentives for expanded production.

In 2011, a Bose-Einstein condensate of Dy atoms was obtained for the first time.

In 2021, Dy was turned into a 2-dimensional supersolid quantum gas.

== Occurrence ==
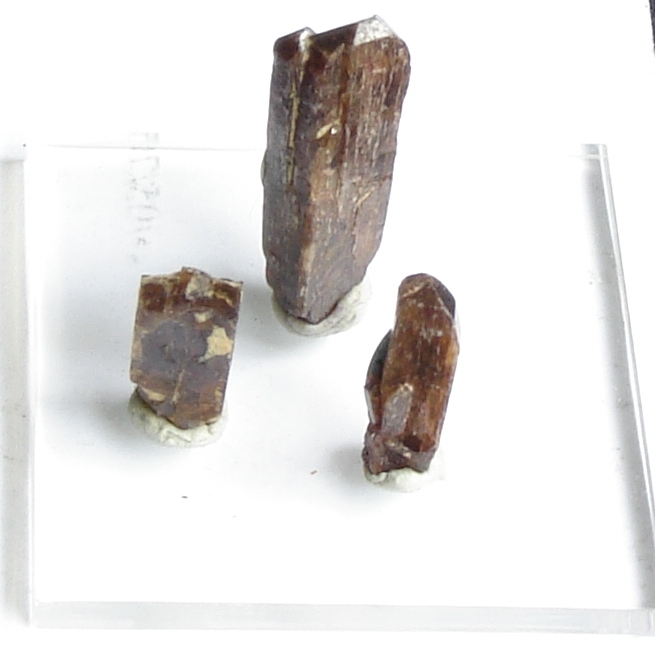
Xenotime

While dysprosium is never encountered as a free element, it is found in many minerals, including xenotime, fergusonite, gadolinite, euxenite, polycrase, blomstrandine, monazite and bastnäsite, often with erbium and holmium or other rare earth elements. No dysprosium-dominant mineral (that is, with dysprosium prevailing over other rare earths in the composition) has yet been found.

In the high-yttrium version of these, dysprosium happens to be the most abundant of the heavy lanthanides, comprising up to 7–8% of the concentrate (as compared to about 65% for yttrium). The concentration of Dy in the Earth's crust is about 5.2 mg/kg and in sea water 0.9 ng/L.

== Production ==
Dysprosium is obtained primarily from monazite sand, a mixture of various phosphates. The metal is obtained as a by-product in the commercial extraction of yttrium. In isolating dysprosium, most of the unwanted metals can be removed magnetically or by a flotation process. Dysprosium can then be separated from other rare earth metals by an ion exchange displacement process. The resulting dysprosium ions can then react with either fluorine or chlorine to form dysprosium fluoride, DyF_{3}, or dysprosium chloride, DyCl_{3}. These compounds can be reduced using either calcium or lithium metals in the following reactions:

3 Ca + 2 DyF_{3} → 2 Dy + 3 CaF_{2}
3 Li + DyCl_{3} → Dy + 3 LiCl

The components are placed in a tantalum crucible and fired in a helium atmosphere. As the reaction progresses, the resulting halide compounds and molten dysprosium separate due to differences in density. When the mixture cools, the dysprosium can be cut away from the impurities.

About 3100 tonnes of dysprosium were produced worldwide in 2021, with 40% of that total produced in China, 31% in Myanmar, and 20% in Australia. Dysprosium prices have climbed over time, from $7 per pound in 2003, to $130 a pound in late 2010, to $1,400/kg in 2011 and then falling to $240/kg in 2015, largely due to illegal production in China which circumvented government restrictions. As of April 2025, the price is around US$203/kg.

Currently, most dysprosium is being obtained from the ion-adsorption clay ores of southern China. As of November 2018 the Browns Range Project pilot plant, 160 km south east of Halls Creek, Western Australia, is producing 50 tonnes (49 long tons) per annum.

According to the United States Department of Energy, the wide range of its current and projected uses, together with the lack of any immediately suitable replacement, makes dysprosium the single most critical element for emerging clean energy technologies; even their most conservative projections predicted a shortfall of dysprosium before 2015. As of October 2015, there is a nascent rare earth (including dysprosium) extraction industry in Australia.

== Applications ==
Dysprosium is used, in conjunction with vanadium and other elements, in making laser materials and commercial lighting. Because of dysprosium's high thermal-neutron absorption cross-section, dysprosium-oxide–nickel cermets are used in neutron-absorbing control rods in nuclear reactors. Dysprosium–cadmium chalcogenides are sources of infrared radiation, which is useful for studying chemical reactions. Because dysprosium and its compounds are highly susceptible to magnetization, they are employed in various data-storage applications, such as in hard disks. Dysprosium is increasingly in demand for the permanent magnets used in electric-car motors and wind-turbine generators.

Neodymium–iron–boron magnets can have up to 6% of the neodymium substituted by dysprosium to raise the coercivity for demanding applications, such as drive motors for electric vehicles and generators for wind turbines. This substitution would require up to 100 grams of dysprosium per electric car produced. Based on Toyota's projected 2 million units per year, the use of dysprosium in applications such as this would quickly exhaust its available supply. The dysprosium substitution may also be useful in other applications because it improves the corrosion resistance of the magnets.

Dysprosium is one of the components of Terfenol-D, along with iron and terbium. Terfenol-D has the highest room-temperature magnetostriction of any known material, which is employed in transducers, wide-band mechanical resonators, and high-precision liquid-fuel injectors.

Dysprosium is used in dosimeters for measuring ionizing radiation. Crystals of calcium sulfate or calcium fluoride are doped with dysprosium. When these crystals are exposed to radiation, the dysprosium atoms become excited and luminescent. The luminescence can be measured to determine the degree of exposure to which the dosimeter has been subjected.

Nanofibers of dysprosium compounds have high strength and a large surface area. Therefore, they can be used to reinforce other materials and act as a catalyst. Fibers of dysprosium oxide fluoride can be produced by heating an aqueous solution of DyBr_{3} and NaF to 450 °C at 450 bars for 17 hours. This material is remarkably robust, surviving over 100 hours in various aqueous solutions at temperatures exceeding 400 °C without redissolving or aggregating. Additionally, dysprosium has been used to create a two-dimensional supersolid in a laboratory environment. Supersolids are expected to exhibit unusual properties, including superfluidity.

Dysprosium iodide and dysprosium bromide are used in high-intensity metal-halide lamps. These compounds dissociate near the hot center of the lamp, releasing isolated dysprosium atoms. The latter re-emit light in the green and red part of the spectrum, thereby effectively producing bright light.

Several paramagnetic crystal salts of dysprosium (dysprosium gallium garnet, DGG; dysprosium aluminium garnet, DAG; dysprosium iron garnet, DyIG) are used in adiabatic demagnetization refrigerators.

The trivalent dysprosium ion (Dy^{3+}) has been studied due to its downshifting luminescence properties. Dy-doped yttrium aluminium garnet (Dy:YAG) excited in the ultraviolet region of the electromagnetic spectrum results in the emission of photons of longer wavelength in the visible region. This idea is the basis for a new generation of UV-pumped white light-emitting diodes.

The stable isotopes of dysprosium have been laser cooled and confined in magneto-optical traps for quantum physics experiments. The first Bose and Fermi quantum degenerate gases of an open shell lanthanide were created with dysprosium. Because dysprosium is highly magnetic—indeed it is the most magnetic fermionic element and nearly tied with terbium for most magnetic bosonic atom—such gases serve as the basis for quantum simulation with strongly dipolar atoms.

Due to its strong magnetic properties, dysprosium alloys are used in the marine industry's sound navigation and ranging (SONAR) system. The inclusion of dysprosium alloys in the design of SONAR transducers and receivers can improve sensitivity and accuracy by providing more stable and efficient magnetic fields.

== Precautions ==
Like many powders, dysprosium powder may present an explosion hazard when mixed with air and when an ignition source is present. Thin foils of the substance can also be ignited by sparks or by static electricity. Dysprosium fires cannot be extinguished with water. It can react with water to produce flammable hydrogen gas. Dysprosium chloride fires can be extinguished with water. Dysprosium fluoride and dysprosium oxide are non-flammable. Dysprosium nitrate, Dy(NO_{3})_{3}, is a strong oxidizing agent and readily ignites on contact with organic substances.

Soluble dysprosium salts, such as dysprosium chloride and dysprosium nitrate are mildly toxic when ingested. Based on the toxicity of dysprosium chloride to mice, it is estimated that the ingestion of 500 grams or more could be fatal to a human (cf. lethal dose of 300 grams of common table salt for a 100 kilogram human). The insoluble salts are non-toxic.

== See also ==
- Lanthanide
- Rare-earth element
- Neodymium magnet
- Terfenol-D
- Monazite
- F-block
