= Ammonium bromide =

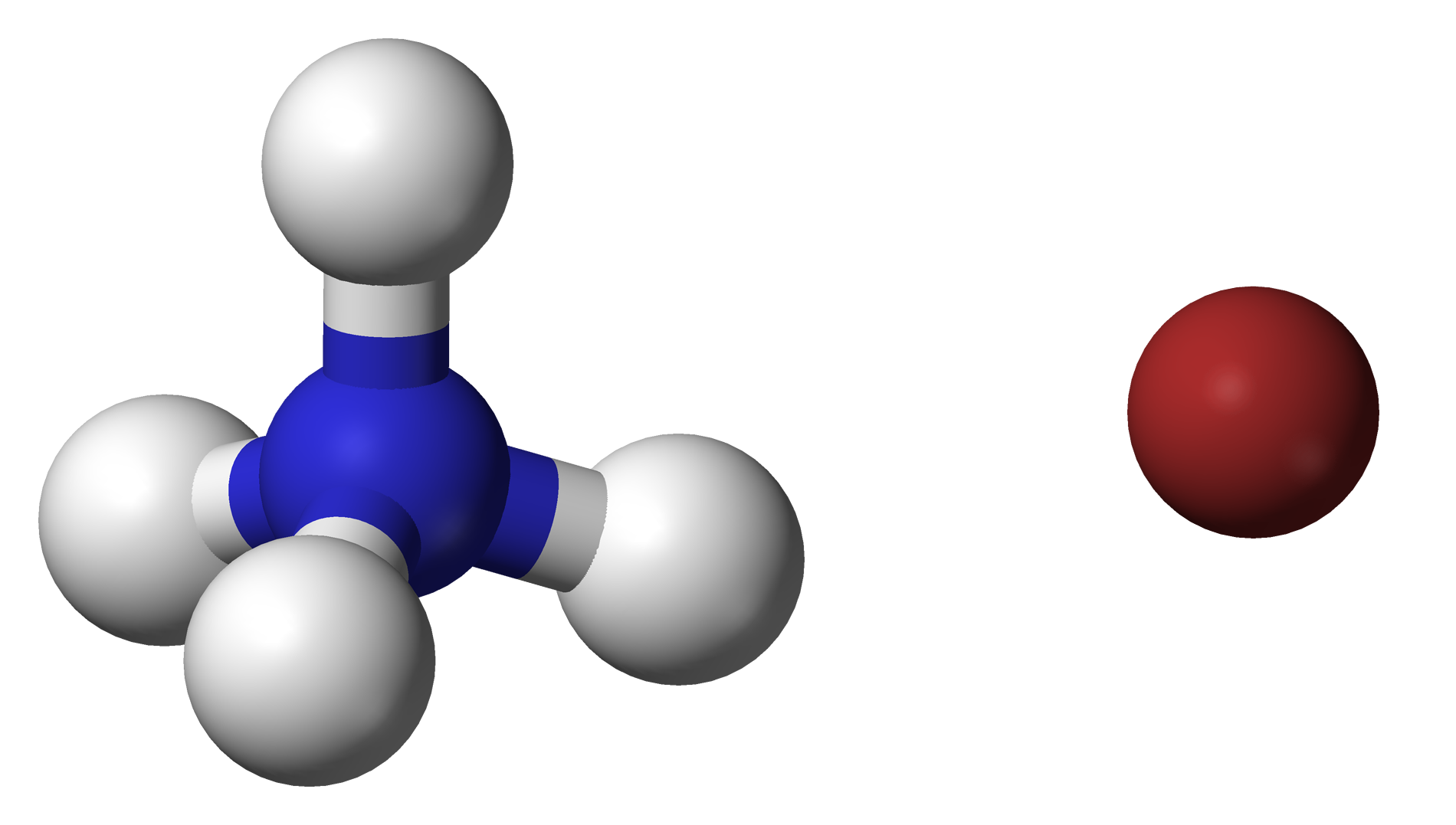
- ball-and-stick model of an ammonium cation (left) and a bromide anion (right)

Names
- IUPAC name Ammonium bromide

Identifiers
CAS Number	12124-97-9
3D model (JSmol)	Interactive image
ChEBI	CHEBI:85364
ChemSpider	23804
ECHA InfoCard	100.031.973
EC Number	235-183-8
PubChem CID	25514
RTECS number	BO9155000
UNII	R0JB3224WS
CompTox Dashboard (EPA)	DTXSID8035681
- InChI: InChI=1S/BrH.H3N/h1H;1H3 Key: SWLVFNYSXGMGBS-UHFFFAOYSA-N; InChI=1/BrH.H3N/h1H;1H3 Key: SWLVFNYSXGMGBS-UHFFFAOYAP
- SMILES: [Br-].[NH4+]

Properties
Chemical formula	NH_{4}Br
Molar mass	97.94 g/mol
Appearance	white powder, hygroscopic
Density	2.429 g/cm^{3}
Melting point	235 °C (455 °F; 508 K)
Boiling point	452 °C (846 °F; 725 K)
Solubility in water	60.6 g/100 mL (0 °C); 78.3 g/100 mL (25 °C); 145 g/100 mL (100 °C)
Magnetic susceptibility (χ)	−47.0×10^{−6} cm^{3}/mol
Refractive index (n_{D})	1.712

Structure
Crystal structure	Isometric

Hazards
- GHS labelling
Pictograms	(GHS07: Exclamation mark)
Signal word	Warning
Hazard statements	H315, H319, H335
Precautionary statements	P261, P264, P271, P280, P302+P352, P304+P340, P305+P351+P338, P312, P321, P332+P313, P337+P313, P362, P403+P233, P405, P501
NFPA 704 (fire diamond)	2 0 0

Related compounds
Other anions	Ammonium fluoride Ammonium chloride Ammonium iodide
Other cations	Sodium bromide Potassium bromide
- Except where otherwise noted, data are given for materials in their standard state (at 25 °C [77 °F], 100 kPa). verify (what is ?) Infobox references

Ammonium bromide, NH_{4}Br, is the ammonium salt of hydrobromic acid. The chemical crystallizes in colorless prisms, possessing a saline taste; it sublimes on heating and is easily soluble in water. On exposure to air it gradually assumes a yellow color because of the oxidation of bromide (Br^{−}) to bromine (Br_{2}).

== Structure ==
Ammonium bromide is a salt that crystallizes in a motif akin those for the alkali metal bromides chlorides. Several phases have been characterized, which are similar but not identical to those of ammonium chloride.

Ammonium bromide melts congruently but only under pressure.

When dissolved, the lattice disassembles into separate bromide and ammonium cations. At neutral pH, the N-H bonds rapidly exchange with water.

== Preparation ==
Ammonium bromide can be prepared by the direct action of hydrogen bromide on ammonia.

NH_{3} + HBr → NH_{4}Br

It can also be prepared by the reaction of ammonia with iron(II) bromide or iron(III) bromide, which may be obtained by passing aqueous bromine solution over iron filings.

2 NH_{3} + FeBr_{2} + 2 H_{2}O → 2 NH_{4}Br + Fe(OH)_{2}

== Reactions ==
Ammonium bromide is a weak acid with a pK_{a} of approximately 9 in water. It is an acid salt because the ammonium ion hydrolyzes slightly in water.

Ammonium bromide is a strong electrolyte when put in water:

NH_{4}Br(s) → NH^{+}_{4}(aq) + Br^{−}(aq)

Ammonium bromide decomposes to ammonia and hydrogen bromide when heated at elevated temperatures:

NH_{4}Br → NH_{3} + HBr

== Uses ==
Ammonium bromide is used for photography in films, plates and papers; in fireproofing of wood; in lithography and process engraving; in corrosion inhibitors; and in pharmaceutical preparations.

Ammonium bromide has historically been used in limited flame-retardant formulations in the wood industry. However, due to concerns over toxicity, corrosive combustion products, and environmental impact, its use in fire-retardant wood treatments has been largely discontinued in Europe, with non-essential industrial applications effectively phased out in the early 2000s.
