= Dysprosium(III) oxide =

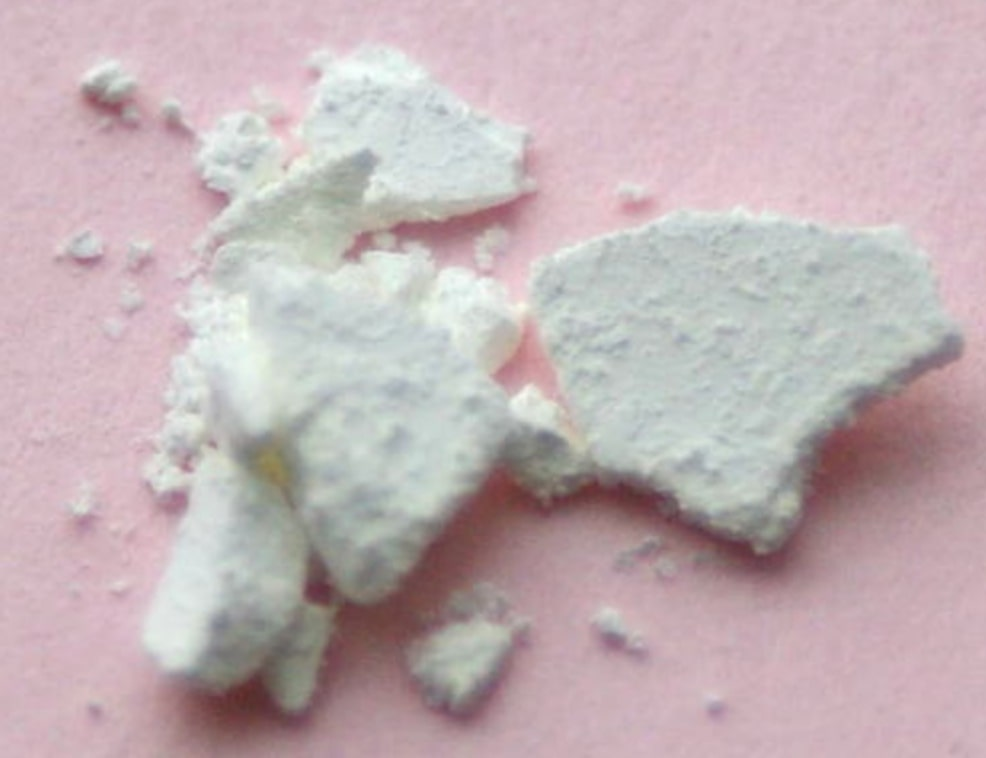

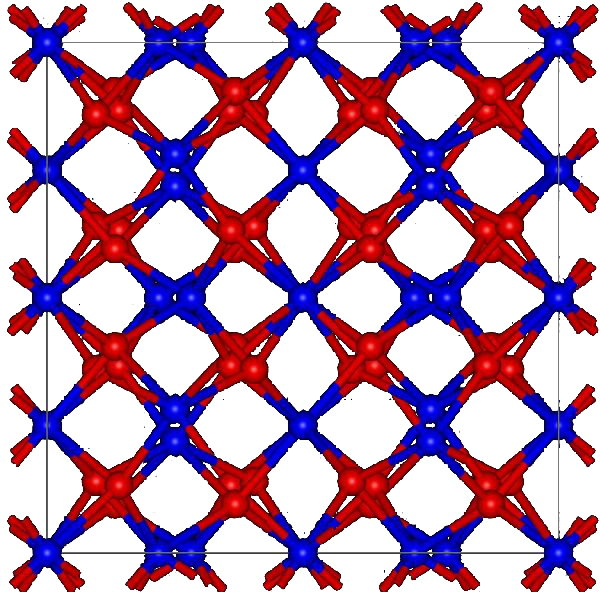

Identifiers
CAS Number	1308-87-8
3D model (JSmol)	Interactive image
ChemSpider	3296880
ECHA InfoCard	100.013.786
PubChem CID	159370
UNII	Y423N8C3EV
CompTox Dashboard (EPA)	DTXSID20276467
- InChI: InChI=1S/2Dy.3O Key: NLQFUUYNQFMIJW-UHFFFAOYSA-N; InChI=1/2Dy.3O/rDy2O3/c3-1-5-2-4 Key: NLQFUUYNQFMIJW-XDEDGNAWAZ
- SMILES: O=[Dy]O[Dy]=O

Properties
Chemical formula	Dy_{2}O_{3}
Molar mass	372.998 g/mol
Appearance	pastel yellowish-greenish powder.
Density	7.80 g/cm^{3}
Melting point	2,408 °C (4,366 °F; 2,681 K)
Solubility in water	Negligible
Magnetic susceptibility (χ)	+89,600·10^{−6} cm^{3}/mol

Structure
Crystal structure	Cubic, cI80
Space group	Ia3̅, No. 206

Hazards
- Occupational safety and health (OHS/OSH)
Main hazards	Non-Toxic
Safety data sheet (SDS)	External MSDS

Related compounds
Other anions	Dysprosium(III) chloride
Other cations	Terbium(III) oxide, Holmium(III) oxide
- Except where otherwise noted, data are given for materials in their standard state (at 25 °C [77 °F], 100 kPa). verify (what is ?) Infobox references

Dysprosium oxide (Dy_{2}O_{3}) is a sesquioxide compound of the rare earth metal dysprosium. It is a pastel yellowish-greenish, slightly hygroscopic powder having specialized uses in ceramics, glass, phosphors, lasers, dysprosium metal halide lamps, and as a Faraday rotator.

It can react with acids to produce the corresponding dysprosium(III) salts:

Dy_{2}O_{3} + 6 HCl → 2 DyCl_{3} + 3 H_{2}O
