= Lanthanide oxyhalide =

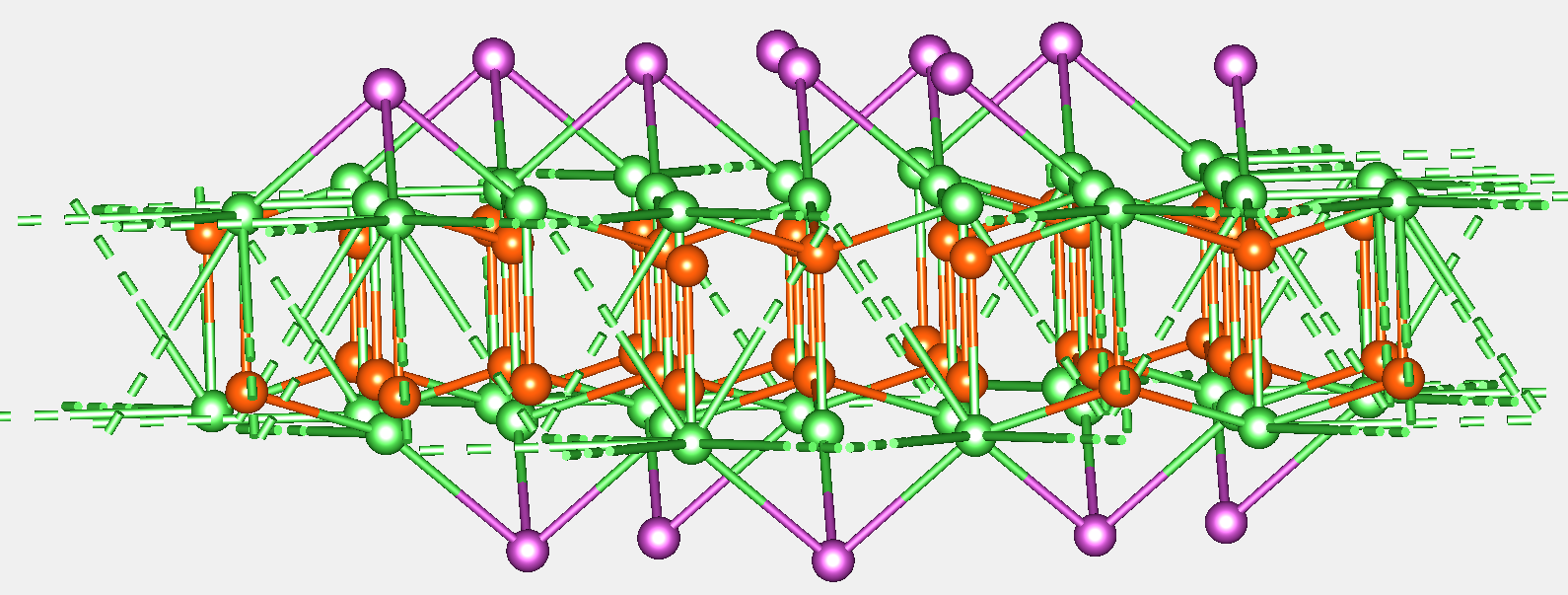
Portion of lattice of lutetium oxychloride.

A lanthanide oxyhalide is an inorganic compound that contains a lanthanide (Ln), oxide, and halide (X). The simplest members have the formula LnOX. The three heavier member of this class, lanthanide oxychlorides, lanthanide oxybromides, and lanthanide oxyiodides, can be prepared by hydrolysis of the corresponding lanthanide trihalides :

LnX_{3} + H_{2}O → LnOX + 2 HX (X = Cl, Br, I)

The lanthanide oxyfluorides are the unique member of the series. They are prepared by the thermal reaction of the trifluorides and the oxides:

Ln_{2}O_{3} + LnF_{3} → 3LnOF

== Inventory ==
Lanthanide oxyhalide
LnOF	structure type	LnOCl	structure type	LnOBr	structure type	LnOI	structure type
LaOF	fluorite	LaOCl	PbFCl	LaOBr	PbFCl	LaOI	
CeOF	fluorite	CeOCl	PbFCl	CeOBr	PbFCl	CeOI	
PrOF	fluorite	PrOCl	PbFCl	PrOBr	PbFCl	PrOI	??
NdOF	fluorite	NdOCl	PbFCl	NdOBr	PbFCl	NdOI	
PmOF	fluorite	PmOCl	??	I PmOBr		PmOI	
SmOF	fluorite	SmOCl	PbFCl	SmOBr	PbFCl	SmOI	
EuOF	fluorite	EuOCl	PbFCl	EuOBr	PbFCl	EuOI	
GdOF	fluorite	GdOCl	PbFCl	GdOBr	PbFCl	GdOI	
TbOF		TbOCl	PbFCl	TbOBr	PbFCl	TbOI	
DyOF	fluorite	DyOCl	PbFCl	DyOBr	PbFCl	DyOI	
HoOF	fluorite	HoOCl	PbFCl	HoOBr	PbFCl	HoOI	
ErOF	fluorite	ErOCl	dimorphic: PbFCl & SmIS	ErOBr	PbFCl	ErOI	
TmOF	fluorite	TmOCl	SmIS	TmOBr	PbFCl	LuOI	
YbOF	fluorite	YbOCl	SmIS	YOBr	PbFCl	YOI	
LuOF	fluorite	LuOCl	SmIS-type	LuOBr	PbFCl	LuOI	PbFCl

== Structures ==
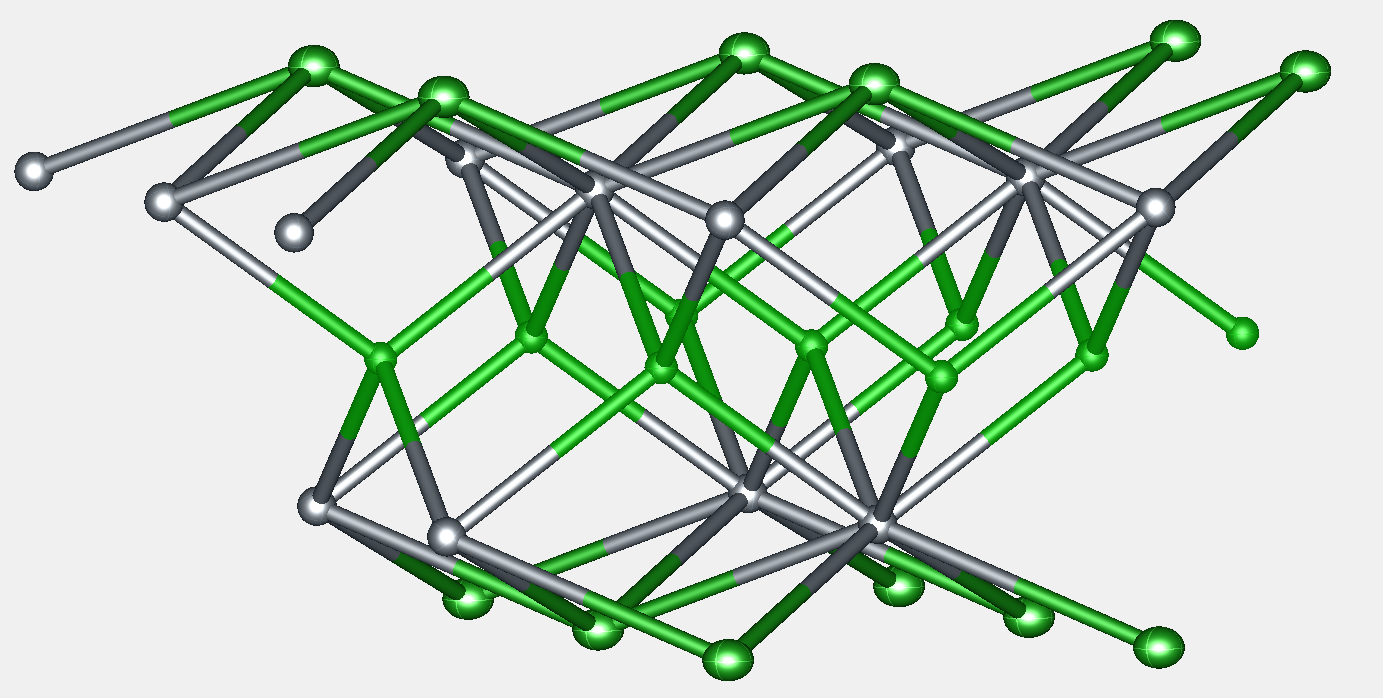
Subunit of solid LaOCl, showing the atomic structure as determined by X-ray crystallography. The larger green spheres are chloride, the tetrahedrally-bonded smaller green spheres represent oxide. This image is that of PbFCl, which has the same motif.

The lanthanide oxychlorides, oxybromides, and oxyiodides adopt layered structures featuring 8-or 9-coordinated Ln ions sandwiched between arrays of halide and oxides. Most of the lighter oxychlorides follow the PbFCl motif, but the three heaviest adopt structures like that of SmSI (samarium sulfide iodide).

The oxyfluorides adopt the fluorite structure.
