= Promethium(III) bromide =

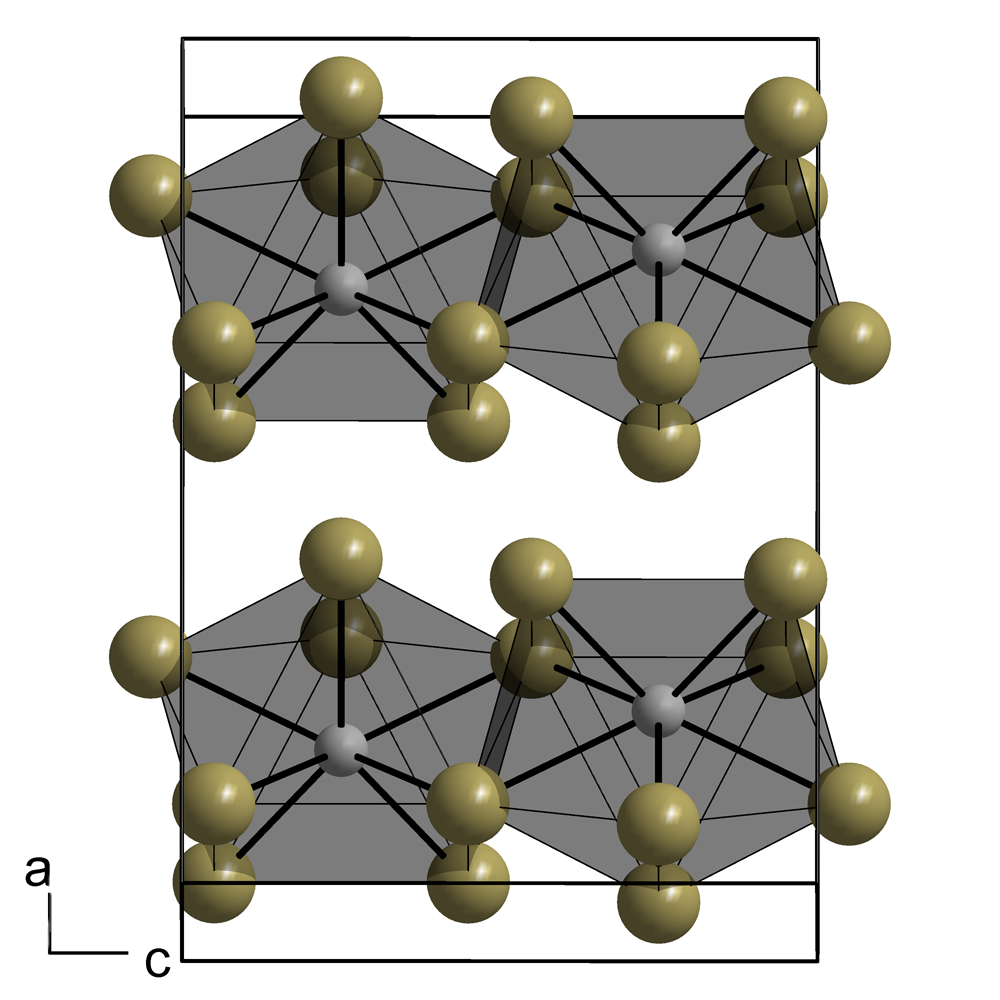

Names
- IUPAC name Promethium(III) bromide

Identifiers
CAS Number	14325-78-1
3D model (JSmol)	Interactive image
ChemSpider	132220178
PubChem CID	129681503
- InChI: InChI=1S/3BrH.Pm/h3*1H;/q;;;+3/p-3 Key: GWRKFHUNEGTAQB-UHFFFAOYSA-K
- SMILES: [Pm+3].[Br-].[Br-].[Br-]

Properties
Chemical formula	PmBr_{3}
Molar mass	385
Appearance	Red solid
Melting point	624

Related compounds
Other anions	Promethium(III) fluoride Promethium(III) chloride Promethium(III) iodide
Other cations	Neodymium(III) bromide Samarium(III) bromide
- Except where otherwise noted, data are given for materials in their standard state (at 25 °C [77 °F], 100 kPa). Infobox references

Promethium(III) bromide is an inorganic compound, with the chemical formula of PmBr_{3}. It is radioactive salt. It is a crystal of the hexagonal crystal system, with the space group of P6_{3}/mc (No. 176).

== Preparation ==
Promethium(III) bromide can be obtained by reacting hydrogen bromide and promethium(III) oxide:

Pm_{2}O_{3} + 6 HBr —^{500°C}→ 2 PmBr_{3} + 3 H_{2}O

Promethium(III) bromide hydrate cannot be heated to form its anhydrous form. Instead it decomposes in water to form promethium oxybromide:

PmBr_{3} + H_{2}O(g) → PmOBr + 2 HBr
