= Promethium(III) iodide =

Names
- Other names Promethium iodide Promethium triiodide

Identifiers
CAS Number	13818-73-0
3D model (JSmol)	Interactive image
PubChem CID	129629045
- InChI: InChI=1S/3HI.Pm/h3*1H;/q;;;+3/p-3 Key: CCGSLKOPQLRTPK-UHFFFAOYSA-K
- SMILES: [I-].[I-].[I-].[Pm+3]

Properties
Chemical formula	PmI_{3}
Appearance	red solid
Melting point	695 °C

Related compounds
Other anions	promethium(III) fluoride promethium(III) chloride promethium(III) bromide
Other cations	neodymium(III) iodide samarium(III) iodide
Related compounds	promethium diiodide
- Except where otherwise noted, data are given for materials in their standard state (at 25 °C [77 °F], 100 kPa). Infobox references

Promethium(III) iodide is an inorganic compound, with the chemical formula of PmI_{3}. It is a red radioactive solid with a melting point of 695 °C.

== Preparation ==
Promethium(III) iodide is obtained by reacting anhydrous hydrogen iodide and promethium(III) chloride at a high temperature:

PmCl_{3} + 3 HI → PmI_{3} + 3 HCl

From the reaction of a HI-H_{2} mixture and promethium oxide (Pm_{2}O_{3}), promethium(III) iodide cannot be produced, and only promethium oxyiodide (PmOI) can be obtained. Promethium oxide reacts with molten aluminum iodide at 500 °C to form promethium iodide.
