= Holmium oxyfluoride =

Names
- Other names: Holmium oxide fluoride; Holmium(III) oxyfluoride

Identifiers
3D model (JSmol)	Interactive image
- InChI: InChI=1S/FH.Ho.O/h1H;;/q;+3;-2/p-1 Key: KTAGIUUVTOXAAL-UHFFFAOYSA-M
- SMILES: [F-].[Ho+3].[O-2]

Properties
Chemical formula	HoOF
Molar mass	199.928 g/mol
Appearance	crystals
Density	7.23 g/cm^{3}

Structure
Crystal structure	hexagonal
Space group	R3̅m

Related compounds
Related compounds	Praseodymium oxyfluoride; Neodymium oxyfluoride; Lanthanum oxyfluoride; Plutonium oxyfluoride
- Except where otherwise noted, data are given for materials in their standard state (at 25 °C [77 °F], 100 kPa). Infobox references

Holmium oxyfluoride is an inorganic compound of holmium, oxygen, and fluorine with the chemical formula HoOF.

== Synthesis ==
HoOF can be synthesized by pyrolyzing Ho(OH)_{2}F from the chemical reaction between the layered Ho_{2}(OH)_{5}NO_{3} compound and NH_{4}F in the liquid phase.

== Physical properties ==
The compound forms crystals of the hexagonal system, space group R3̅m, structure type YOF.
