= Actinium oxychloride =

Names
- Other names: Actinium oxide chloride; Actinium(III) oxychloride

Identifiers
CAS Number	49848-29-5
3D model (JSmol)	Interactive image
- InChI: InChI=1S/Ac.ClH.O/h;1H;/q+3;;-2/p-1 Key: QDGBHMLRDYAEIV-UHFFFAOYSA-M
- SMILES: [Ac+3].[Cl-].[O-2]

Properties
Chemical formula	AcOCl
Molar mass	278 g/mol
Appearance	white crystals
Density	7.23 g/cm^{3}
Melting point	1,000 °C (1,830 °F; 1,270 K)

Structure
Crystal structure	tetragonal

Related compounds
Related compounds	Praseodymium oxychloride; Neodymium oxychloride; Lanthanum oxychloride; Plutonium oxychloride
- Except where otherwise noted, data are given for materials in their standard state (at 25 °C [77 °F], 100 kPa). Infobox references

Actinium oxychloride or actinium oxide chloride is an inorganic compound of actinium, oxygen, and chlorine with the chemical formula AcOCl.

== Synthesis ==
AcOCl can be synthesized by reacting AcCl_{3} with water at 1000 °C.

Also, it can be produced by heating AcCl_{3} in ammonia vapor at 900 °C.

== Physical properties ==
The compound forms white crystals of the tetragonal system, structure type of PbClF.
