= Plutonium oxychloride =

Names
- Other names Plutonium oxide chloride

Identifiers
| 3D model (JSmol) | Interactive image |
- InChI: InChI=1S/ClH.O.Pu/h1H;;/q;-2;+3/p-1 Key: CCCZQYUIKINKSJ-UHFFFAOYSA-M
- SMILES: [Cl-].[O-2].[Pu+3]

Properties
| Chemical formula | PuOCl |
| Molar mass | 295 g/mol |
| Appearance | green crystals |
| Density | 8.81 g/cm^{3} |
| Solubility in water | insoluble |

Structure
| Crystal structure | tetragonal |
| Space group | P4/nmm |

Related compounds
| Other anions | Plutonium oxyfluoride Plutonium oxybromide Plutonium oxyiodide |
| Other cations | Lanthanum oxychloride Neodymium oxychloride Americium(III) oxychloride Curium(III) oxychloride Actinium oxychloride |
- Except where otherwise noted, data are given for materials in their standard state (at 25 °C [77 °F], 100 kPa). Infobox references

Plutonium oxychloride is an inorganic compound of plutonium, oxygen, and chlorine with the chemical formula PuOCl.

== Synthesis ==
It is produced in a reaction of plutonium(III) oxide with calcium chloride:

Pu_{2}O_{3} + CaCl_{2} → 2PuOCl + CaO

It is also formed in trace quantities in the reaction between plutonium trichloride and calcium oxide, which mainly produces plutonium monoxide:

PuCl_{3} + CaO → PuOCl + CaCl_{2}

The compound is also synthesized by heating PuCl_{3}·6H_{2}O in a sealed tube, or by treating PuO_{2} or PuCl_{3} at 650 °C with a vapour mixture prepared via bubbling H_{2} through aqueous HCl.

== Physical properties ==
Plutonium oxychloride appears as a green or blue-green crystals (space group P4/nmm) that are insoluble in water but dissolve in dilute acidic solutions. X-ray diffraction analysis of PuOCl reveals a tetragonal crystal structure, with two molecules present in each unit cell.

== Chemical properties ==
PuOCl reacts with calcium (dissolved in liquid calcium chloride) or high-temperature barium vapour to form plutonium monoxide.
