= Samarium(III) oxyiodide =

Names
- Other names Samarium iodide oxide

Identifiers
CAS Number	60763-35-1
3D model (JSmol)	Interactive image
- InChI: InChI=1S/HI.O.Sm/h1H;;/q;-2;+3/p-1 Key: CGXYQWRVSQQLMC-UHFFFAOYSA-M
- SMILES: [Sm+3].[O-2].[I-]

Properties
Chemical formula	IOSm
Molar mass	293.26 g·mol^{−1}
Appearance	light milky yellow solid

Related compounds
Other anions	Samarium oxysulfide Samarium oxychloride
- Except where otherwise noted, data are given for materials in their standard state (at 25 °C [77 °F], 100 kPa). Infobox references

Samarium(III) oxyiodide is an inorganic compound with the chemical formula SmOI. It can be obtained by reacting samarium(II) iodide with dry oxygen. It is oxidized when heated to 335 °C in air, and starts to generate nSmOI·Sm_{2}O_{3} (n is 7, 4, 2 respectively) at 460 °C, 560 °C, and 640 °C, and completely transforms at 885 °C for samarium oxide. It can catalyze the rearrangement of propylene oxide derivatives to methyl ketones. It reacts with samarium(III) iodide, sodium iodide, and sodium at 903 K in a tantalum container to obtain black Sm_{4}OI_{6}.

== External reading ==
- Mikhail Ryazanov, Constantin Hoch, Hansjürgen Mattausch, Arndt Simon (2006-11-01). "Sm2O2I – A New Mixed-Valence Samarium(II,III) Oxide Halide". Zeitschrift für anorganische und allgemeine Chemie (in German). 632 (15): 2385–2388. Bibcode:2006ZAACh.632.2385R. doi:10.1002/zaac.200600176.
