= Terbium oxyfluoride =

Names
- IUPAC name oxygen(2-); terbium(3+); fluoride
- Other names Terbium oxide fluoride

Identifiers
CAS Number	21031-92-5
3D model (JSmol)	Interactive image
ChemSpider	10759990
PubChem CID	22023124
- InChI: InChI=1S/FH.O.Tb/h1H;;/q;-2;+3/p-1 Key: JKFPFLINCNVUOW-UHFFFAOYSA-M
- SMILES: [O-2].[F-].[Tb+3]

Properties
Chemical formula	TbOF
Molar mass	193.923 g/mol
Appearance	White crystalline solid
Solubility in water	Insoluble

Hazards
- GHS labelling
Pictograms	(GHS06: Toxic)
Signal word	Danger
Hazard statements	H302, H312, H315, H319, H331, H335
Precautionary statements	P261, P280, P304, P305, P338, P340, P351, P405, P501

Related compounds
Related compounds	Praseodymium oxyfluoride; Lanthanum oxyfluoride; Samarium oxyfluoride
- Except where otherwise noted, data are given for materials in their standard state (at 25 °C [77 °F], 100 kPa). Infobox references

Terbium oxyfluoride or terbium oxide fluoride is an inorganic compound of terbium, oxygen, and fluorine with the chemical formula TbOF.

== Synthesis ==
The compound can be formed as a result of the hydrolysis of terbium(IV) fluoride in water.

== Physical properties ==
The compound forms a white crystalline solid.

== Uses ==
Terbium oxyfluoride nanoparticles have been synthesized and studied for their magneto-optical properties.
