= Erbium oxyfluoride =

Names
- IUPAC name fluoro(oxo)erbium
- Other names Erbium oxide fluoride

Identifiers
CAS Number	13825-13-3
3D model (JSmol)	Interactive image
ChemSpider	28294928
EC Number	678-684-0
PubChem CID	134068136
- InChI: InChI=1S/Er.FH.O/h;1H;/q+3;;-2/p-1 Key: WHNBDFNXKDUDPO-UHFFFAOYSA-M
- SMILES: [O-2].[F-].[Er+3]

Properties
Chemical formula	ErOF
Molar mass	202.256 g/mol
Appearance	Light red crystalline powder

Structure
Crystal structure	orthorhombic, rhombohedral

Hazards
- GHS labelling
Signal word	Danger
Hazard statements	H302, H312, H315, H319, H331, H335

Related compounds
Related compounds	Lanthanum oxyfluoride; Neodymium oxyfluoride; Samarium oxyfluoride
- Except where otherwise noted, data are given for materials in their standard state (at 25 °C [77 °F], 100 kPa). Infobox references

Erbium oxyfluoride or erbium oxide fluoride is an inorganic compound of erbium, oxygen, and fluorine with the chemical formula ErOF.

== Physical properties ==
The compound forms crystals of orthorhombic and rhombohedral structures. The irreversible phase transition from O-ErOF to R-ErOF was observed under heating around 600 °C.
