= Promethocene =

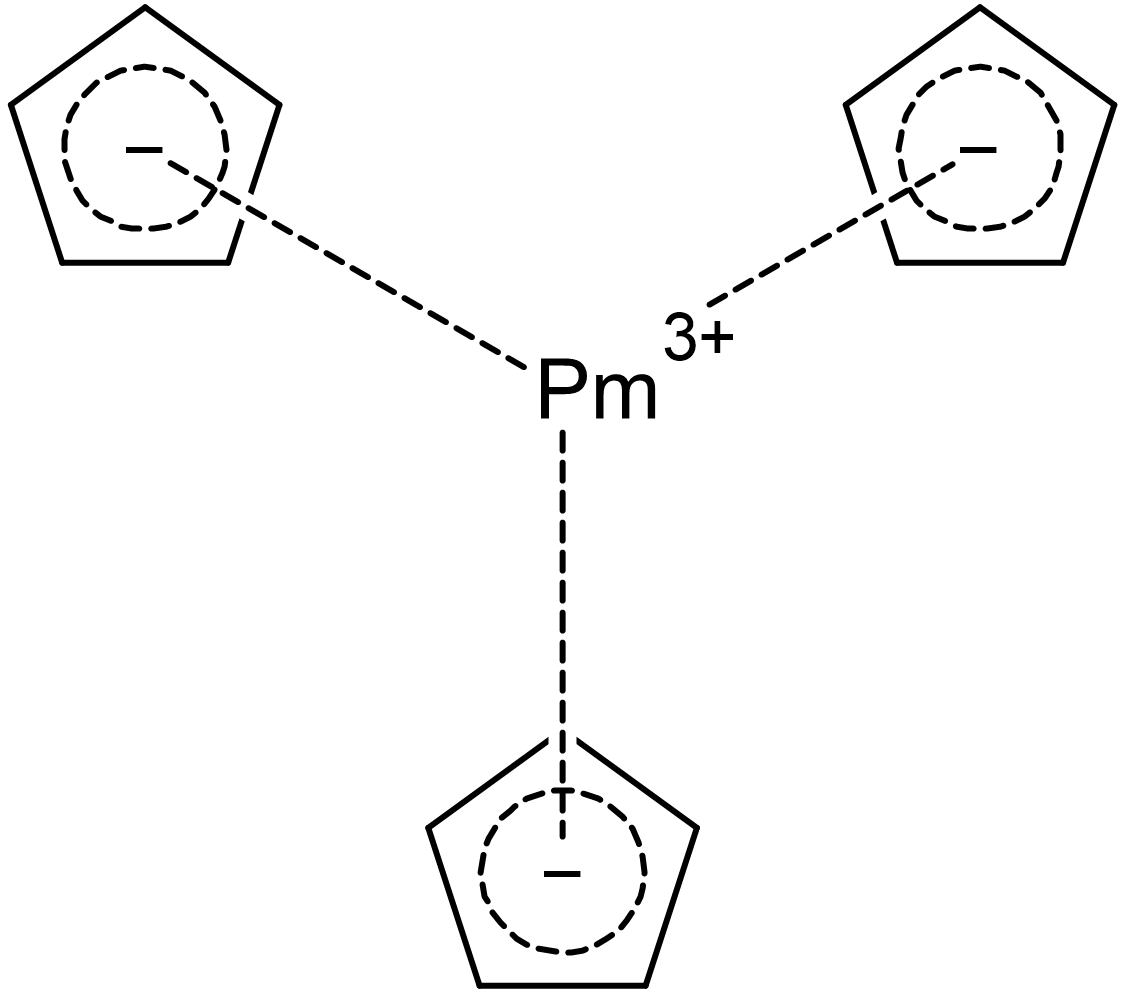

Names
- Other names Promethium cyclopentadienide

Identifiers
CAS Number	112341-23-8
3D model (JSmol)	Interactive image
- InChI: InChI=1S/3C5H5.Pm/c3*1-2-4-5-3-1;/h3*1-5H;/q3*-1;+3 Key: SKRISUXFUFKQSA-UHFFFAOYSA-N
- SMILES: c1ccc[cH-]1.c2ccc[cH-]2.c3ccc[cH-]3.[Pm+3]

Properties
Chemical formula	Pm(C_{5}H_{5})_{3}
Molar mass	340.285
Appearance	yellow-orange solid
Boiling point	145~260 °C (10^{−3}~10^{−4}mmHg, sublimates)

Related compounds
Related compounds	cyclopentadiene
- Except where otherwise noted, data are given for materials in their standard state (at 25 °C [77 °F], 100 kPa). Infobox references

Promethocene is a metal-organic compound of promethium with the chemical formula Pm(C_{5}H_{5})_{3}. It is radioactive and stable in dry air. Promethocene is different from cyclopentadiene complexes of general transition metals and is considered to be ionically bonded. Theoretical calculations show that its Pm natural population analysis (NPA) electronic configuration is 6s^{0.11}5d^{1.19}4f^{2.21}.

== Preparation ==
Promethocene can be obtained by reacting anhydrous promethium(III) chloride and sodium cyclopentadienide in a tetrahydrofuran medium:

3C_{5}H_{5}Na + PmCl_{3} → (C_{5}H_{5})_{3}Pm + 3 NaCl

== Chemical properties ==
Promethocene decomposes when exposed to water to produce promethium(III) hydroxide and cyclopentadiene.
