= Samarium oxychloride =

Names
- Other names Samarium oxide chloride

Identifiers
3D model (JSmol)	Interactive image
- InChI: InChI=1S/ClH.O.Sm/h1H;;/q;-2;+3/p-1 Key: QPDKXMDQJWJKTO-UHFFFAOYSA-M
- SMILES: [Cl-].[O-2].[Sm+3]

Properties
Chemical formula	SmOCl
Molar mass	201.81 g/mol
Appearance	white powder

Structure
Crystal structure	Tetragonal
Space group	P4/nmm

Related compounds
Related compounds	Lanthanum oxychloride; Praseodymium oxychloride; Neodymium oxychloride; Holmium oxychloride; Erbium oxychloride
- Except where otherwise noted, data are given for materials in their standard state (at 25 °C [77 °F], 100 kPa). Infobox references

Samarium oxychloride or samarium oxide chloride is an inorganic compound of samarium, oxygen, and chlorine with the chemical formula SmOCl.

== Synthesis ==
SmOCl can be synthesized by heating samarium oxide in a currect of chlorine.

== Physical properties ==
The compound forms white crystals of the tetragonal system, space group P4/nmm.

SmOCl thermally decomposes to form Sm_{2}O_{3}.

== Uses ==
SmOCl is investigated as a photocatalyst for environment remediation. Also used as a catalyst.
