= Gadolinium oxychloride =

Names
- Other names Gadolinium oxide chloride

Identifiers
3D model (JSmol)	Interactive image
- InChI: InChI=1S/ClH.Gd.O/h1H;;/q;+3;-2/p-1 Key: WBRFDTPGXAFAEL-UHFFFAOYSA-M
- SMILES: [Cl-].[Gd+3].[O-2]

Properties
Chemical formula	GdOCl
Molar mass	208.70 g/mol
Appearance	crystals
Solubility in water	insoluble

Structure
Crystal structure	tetragonal
Space group	P4/nmm

Related compounds
Related compounds	Praseodymium oxychloride; Neodymium oxychloride
- Except where otherwise noted, data are given for materials in their standard state (at 25 °C [77 °F], 100 kPa). Infobox references

Gadolinium oxychloride is an inorganic compound of gadolinium, oxygen, and chlorine with the chemical formula GdOCl.

== Physical properties ==
Gadolinium oxychloride forms crystals of the tetragonal system, space group P4/nmm.

The compound is insoluble in water but dissolves slowly in hydrochloric and nitric acids.
