= Terbium fluoride =

Terbium fluoride may refer to:

- Terbium(III) fluoride (Terbium trifluoride), TbF_{3}
- Terbium(IV) fluoride (Terbium tetrafluoride), TbF_{4}
