= Fermium =

Fermium, _{100}Fm
Fermium
- Pronunciation: /ˈfɜːrmiəm/ (FUR-mee-əm)
- Mass number: [257]

Fermium in the periodic table
| Hydrogen | | | | | | | | | | | | | | | | | | | | | | | | | | | | | | | Helium |
| Lithium | Beryllium | | | | | | | | | | | | | | | | | | | | | | | | | Boron | Carbon | Nitrogen | Oxygen | Fluorine | Neon |
| Sodium | Magnesium | | | | | | | | | | | | | | | | | | | | | | | | | Aluminium | Silicon | Phosphorus | Sulfur | Chlorine | Argon |
| Potassium | Calcium | | | | | | | | | | | | | | | Scandium | Titanium | Vanadium | Chromium | Manganese | Iron | Cobalt | Nickel | Copper | Zinc | Gallium | Germanium | Arsenic | Selenium | Bromine | Krypton |
| Rubidium | Strontium | | | | | | | | | | | | | | | Yttrium | Zirconium | Niobium | Molybdenum | Technetium | Ruthenium | Rhodium | Palladium | Silver | Cadmium | Indium | Tin | Antimony | Tellurium | Iodine | Xenon |
| Caesium | Barium | Lanthanum | Cerium | Praseodymium | Neodymium | Promethium | Samarium | Europium | Gadolinium | Terbium | Dysprosium | Holmium | Erbium | Thulium | Ytterbium | Lutetium | Hafnium | Tantalum | Tungsten | Rhenium | Osmium | Iridium | Platinum | Gold | Mercury (element) | Thallium | Lead | Bismuth | Polonium | Astatine | Radon |
| Francium | Radium | Actinium | Thorium | Protactinium | Uranium | Neptunium | Plutonium | Americium | Curium | Berkelium | Californium | Einsteinium | Fermium | Mendelevium | Nobelium | Lawrencium | Rutherfordium | Dubnium | Seaborgium | Bohrium | Hassium | Meitnerium | Darmstadtium | Roentgenium | Copernicium | Nihonium | Flerovium | Moscovium | Livermorium | Tennessine | Oganesson |
Er
↑
Fm
↓
—
einsteinium ← fermium → mendelevium
- Atomic number (Z): 100
- Group: f-block groups (no number)
- Period: period 7
- Block: f-block
- Electron configuration: [Rn] 5f^{12} 7s^{2}
- Electrons per shell: 2, 8, 18, 32, 30, 8, 2

Physical properties
- Phase at STP: solid (predicted)
- Melting point: 1800 K (1500 °C, 2800 °F) (predicted)
- Density (near r.t.): 9.7(1) g/cm^{3} (Note: The density is calculated from the predicted metallic radius (Silva 2006, p. 1628) and the predicted close-packed crystal structure (Fournier 1976).) (predicted)

Atomic properties
- Oxidation states: common: +3 +2
- Electronegativity: Pauling scale: 1.3
- Ionization energies: 1st: 629 kJ/mol
- Covalent radius: 167 pm (single-bond)
- Van der Waals radius: 245 pm

Other properties
- Natural occurrence: synthetic
- Crystal structure: face-centered cubic (fcc) (predicted)
- CAS Number: 7440-72-4

History
- Naming: after Enrico Fermi
- Discovery: Lawrence Berkeley National Laboratory (1953)

Isotopes of fermium
| Main isotopes | | | Decay | |
| Isotope | abundance | half-life (t_{1/2}) | mode | product |
|---|---|---|---|---|
| ^{252}Fm | synth | 25.39 h | α | ^{248}Cf |
| ^{252}Fm | synth | 25.39 h | SF | – |
| ^{253}Fm | synth | 3 d | ε | ^{253}Es |
| ^{253}Fm | synth | 3 d | α | ^{249}Cf |
| ^{255}Fm | synth | 20.07 h | α | ^{251}Cf |
| ^{255}Fm | synth | 20.07 h | SF | – |
| ^{257}Fm | (unstable) | 100.5 d | α | ^{253}Cf |
| ^{257}Fm | (unstable) | 100.5 d | SF | – |

Fermium is a synthetic chemical element; it has symbol Fm and atomic number 100. It is an actinide and the heaviest element that can be formed by neutron bombardment of lighter elements, and hence the last element that can be prepared in macroscopic quantities, although pure fermium metal has not been prepared yet. A total of 20 isotopes are known, with ^{257}Fm being the longest-lived with a half-life of 100.5 days.

Fermium was discovered in 1952 in the debris of the first detonation test of a hydrogen bomb, and named after Enrico Fermi, one of the pioneers of nuclear physics. Its chemistry is typical for the late actinides, with a preponderance of the +3 oxidation state but also an accessible +2 oxidation state. Owing to the small amounts of produced fermium and all of its isotopes having relatively short half-lives, there are currently no uses for it outside basic scientific research.

== Discovery ==
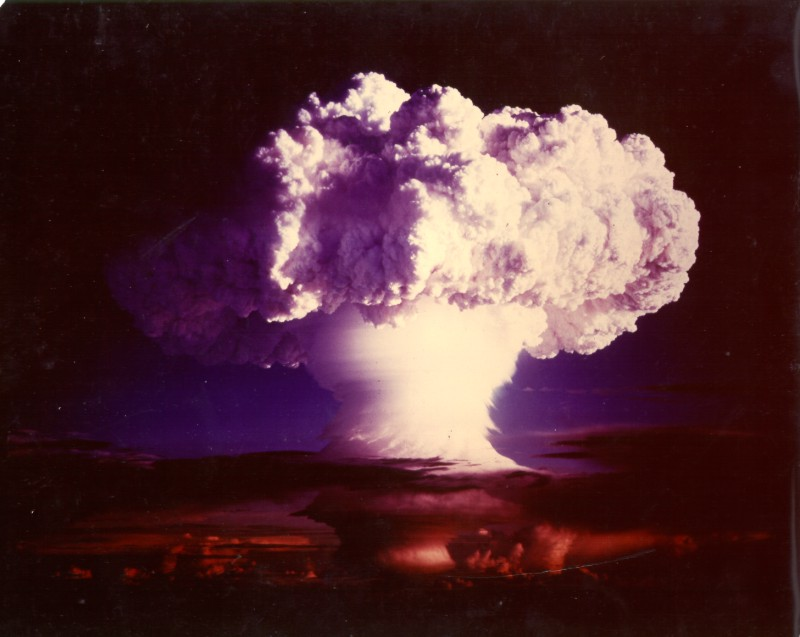
Fermium was first observed in the fallout from the Ivy Mike nuclear test.

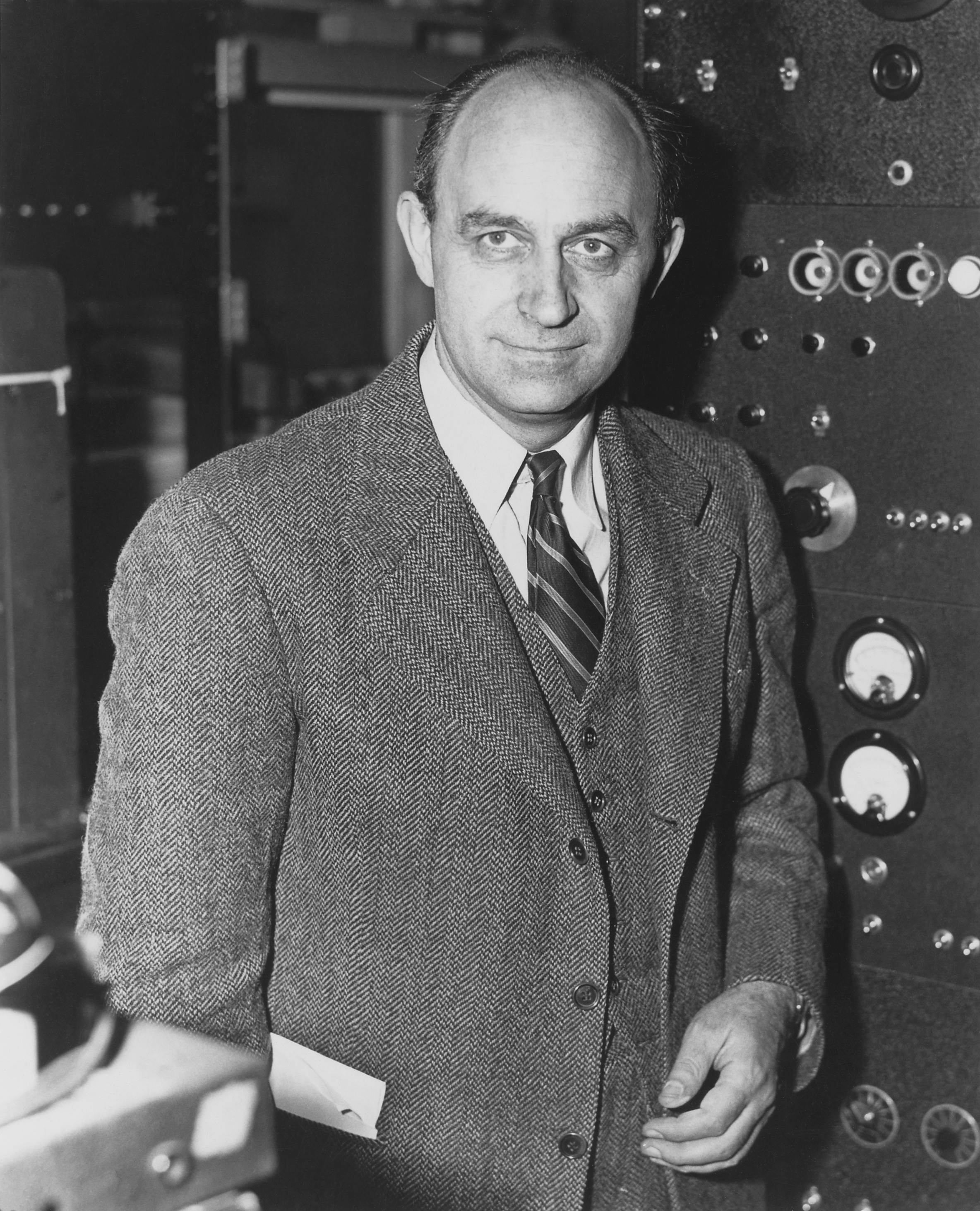
The element was named after Enrico Fermi.

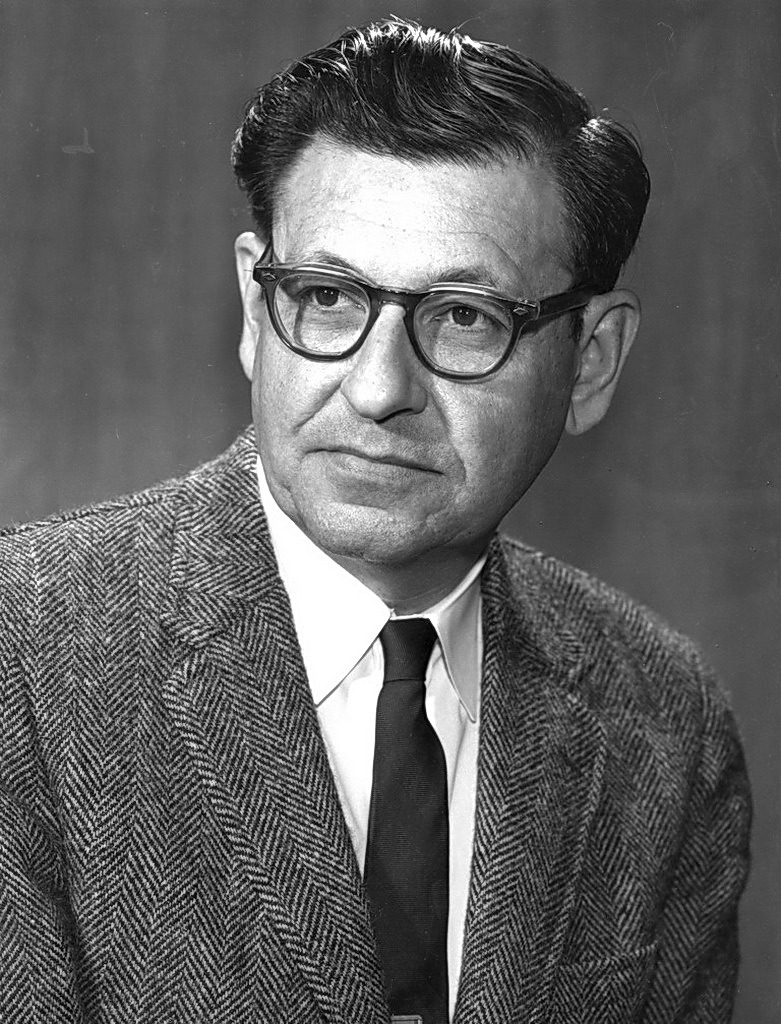
The element was discovered by a team headed by Albert Ghiorso.

Fermium was first discovered in the fallout from the 'Ivy Mike' nuclear test (1 November 1952), the first successful test of a hydrogen bomb. Initial examination of the debris from the explosion had shown the production of a new isotope of plutonium, ^{244}Pu: this could only have formed by the absorption of six neutrons by a uranium-238 nucleus followed by two β^{−} decays. At the time, the absorption of neutrons by a heavy nucleus was thought to be a rare process, but the identification of ^{244}Pu raised the possibility that still more neutrons could have been absorbed by the uranium nuclei, leading to new elements.

Element 99 (einsteinium) was quickly discovered on filter papers which had been flown through clouds from the explosion (the same sampling technique that had been used to discover ^{244}Pu). It was then identified in December 1952 by Albert Ghiorso and co-workers at the University of California, Berkeley. They discovered the isotope ^{253}Es (half-life 20.5 d) that was made by the capture of 15 neutrons by uranium-238 nuclei – which then underwent seven successive beta decays:

| $$\ce{^{238}_{92}U ->[\begin{matrix} \\ +15\ce{n}\end{matrix}][\begin{matrix} 7\beta^- \\ \end{matrix}] {}^{253}_{99}Es}$$ | 1 |

Some ^{238}U atoms, however, could capture another amount of neutrons (most likely, 16 or 17).

The discovery of fermium (Z = 100) required more material, as the yield was expected to be at least an order of magnitude lower than that of element 99, and so contaminated coral from the Enewetak atoll (where the test had taken place) was shipped to the University of California Radiation Laboratory in Berkeley, California, for processing and analysis. About two months after the test, a new component was isolated emitting high-energy α-particles (7.1 MeV) with a half-life of about a day. With such a short half-life, it could only arise from the β^{−} decay of an isotope of einsteinium, and so had to be an isotope of the new element 100: it was quickly identified as ^{255}Fm (t = 20.07(7) h).

The discovery of the new elements, and the new data on neutron capture, was initially kept secret on the orders of the U.S. military until 1955 due to Cold War tensions. Nevertheless, the Berkeley team was able to prepare elements 99 and 100 by civilian means, through the neutron bombardment of plutonium-239, and published this work in 1954 with the disclaimer that it was not the first studies that had been carried out on the elements. The "Ivy Mike" studies were declassified and published in 1955.

The Berkeley team had been worried that another group might discover lighter isotopes of element 100 through ion-bombardment techniques before they could publish their classified research, and this proved to be the case. A group at the Nobel Institute for Physics in Stockholm independently discovered the element, producing an isotope later confirmed to be ^{250}Fm (t_{1/2} = 30 min) by bombarding a ^{238}U target with ^{16}O ions, and published their work in May 1954. Nevertheless, the priority of the Berkeley team was generally recognized, and with it the prerogative to name the new element in honour of Enrico Fermi, the developer of the first artificial self-sustained nuclear reactor. Fermi was still alive when the name was proposed, but had died by the time it became official.

== Isotopes ==
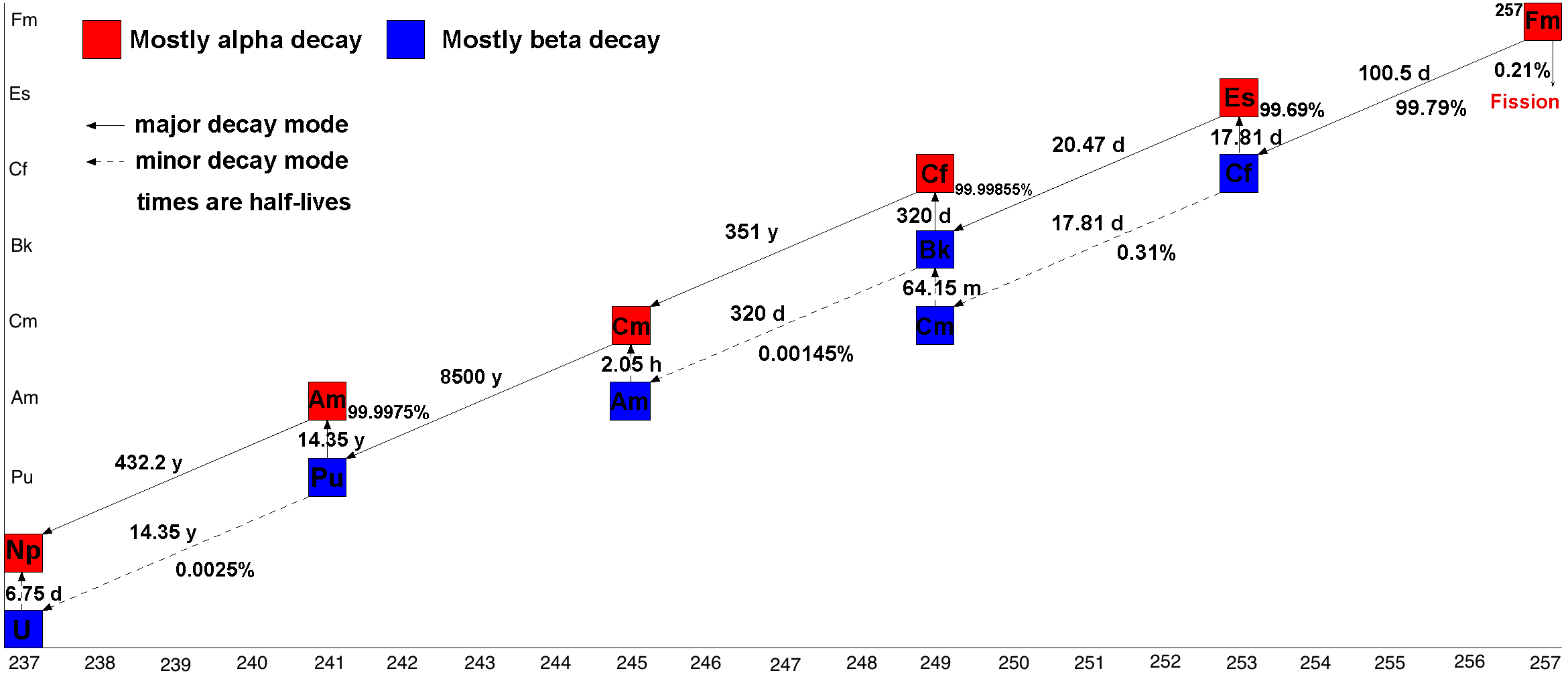
Decay pathway of fermium-257 to neptunium

There are 20 known isotopes of fermium, with atomic weights of 241 to 260, (Note: The discovery of ^{260}Fm is considered unconfirmed by NUBASE.) of which ^{257}Fm is the longest-lived with a half-life of 100.5 days. Other isotopes are considerably shorter: ^{253}Fm has a half-life of 3 days, ^{252}Fm of 25.4 h, ^{255}Fm of 20.1 h, while ^{251}Fm of 5.3 h, ^{254}Fm of 3.2 h, and ^{256}Fm of 2.67 hours. All the remaining ones have half-lives ranging from 30 minutes to less than a millisecond.

The neutron capture product of fermium-257, ^{258}Fm, undergoes spontaneous fission with a half-life of just 370(14) microseconds; ^{259}Fm and ^{260}Fm also undergo spontaneous fission (t_{1/2} = 1.5(3) s and 4 ms respectively). This means that neutron capture does not create nuclides with a mass number greater than 257, unless carried out at extremely high flux, as in a nuclear explosion (or the astrophysical r-process), since no accessible fermium isotopes undergo beta minus decay to the next element, mendelevium. Because of this impediment in forming heavier isotopes, these short-lived isotopes ^{258–260}Fm constitute the "fermium gap."

Deliberate attempts at nuclear explosion synthesis, however, also failed to create heavier nuclei, and as a result were deemed not worth continuing.

== Occurrence ==
=== Production ===
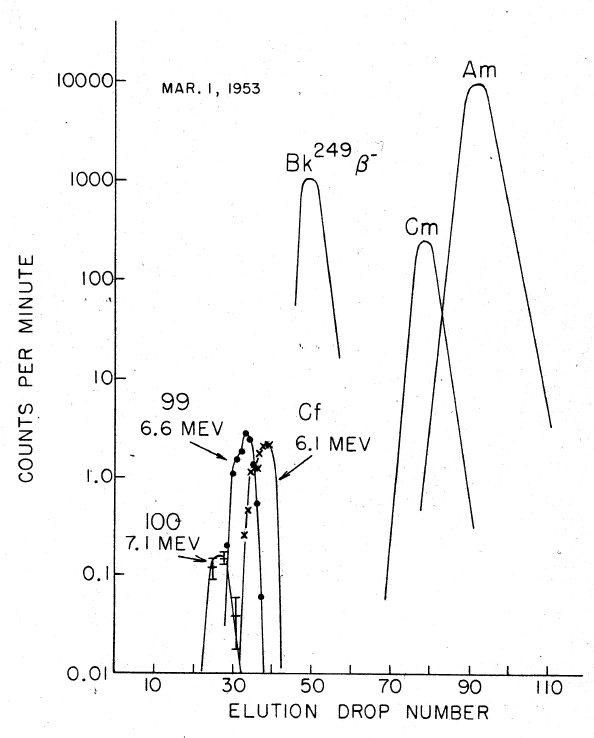
Elution: chromatographic separation of Fm(100), Es(99), Cf, Bk, Cm and Am

Fermium is produced by the bombardment of lighter actinides with neutrons in a nuclear reactor. Fermium-257 is the heaviest isotope that is obtained via neutron capture, and can only be produced in picogram quantities. (Note: All isotopes of elements Z > 100 can only be produced by accelerator-based nuclear reactions with charged particles and can be obtained only in tracer quantities (e.g., 1 million atoms for Md (Z = 101) per hour of irradiation (see Silva 2006).) The major source is the 85 MW High Flux Isotope Reactor (HFIR) at the Oak Ridge National Laboratory in Tennessee, USA, which is dedicated to the production of transcurium (Z > 96) elements. Lower mass fermium isotopes are available in greater quantities, though these isotopes (^{254}Fm and ^{255}Fm) are comparatively short-lived. In a "typical processing campaign" at Oak Ridge, tens of grams of curium are irradiated to produce decigram quantities of californium, milligram quantities of berkelium and einsteinium, and picogram quantities of fermium. However, nanogram quantities of fermium can be prepared for specific experiments. The quantities of fermium produced in 20–200 kiloton thermonuclear explosions is believed to be of the order of milligrams, although it is mixed in with a huge quantity of debris; 4.0 picograms of ^{257}Fm was recovered from 10 kilograms of debris from the "Hutch" test (16 July 1969). The Hutch experiment produced an estimated total of 250 micrograms of ^{257}Fm.

After production, the fermium must be separated from other actinides and from lanthanide fission products. This is usually achieved by ion-exchange chromatography, with the standard process using a cation exchanger such as Dowex 50 or TEVA eluted with a solution of ammonium α-hydroxyisobutyrate. Smaller cations form more stable complexes with the α-hydroxyisobutyrate anion, and so are preferentially eluted from the column. A rapid fractional crystallization method has also been described.

Although the most stable isotope of fermium is ^{257}Fm, with a half-life of 100.5 days, most studies are conducted on ^{255}Fm (t_{1/2} = 20.07(7) hours), since this isotope can be easily isolated as required as the decay product of ^{255}Es (t_{1/2} = 39.8(12) days).

=== Synthesis in nuclear explosions ===
The analysis of the debris at the 10-megaton Ivy Mike nuclear test was a part of long-term project, one of the goals of which was studying the efficiency of production of transuranium elements in high-power nuclear explosions. The motivation for these experiments was as follows: synthesis of such elements from uranium requires multiple neutron capture. The probability of such events increases with the neutron flux, and nuclear explosions are the most powerful neutron sources, providing densities on the order 10^{23} neutrons/cm^{2} within a microsecond, i.e. about 10^{29} neutrons/(cm^{2}·s). For comparison, the flux of the HFIR reactor is 5×10^{15} neutrons/(cm^{2}·s). A dedicated laboratory was set up right at Enewetak Atoll for preliminary analysis of debris, as some isotopes could have decayed by the time the debris samples reached the U.S. The laboratory was receiving samples for analysis, as soon as possible, from airplanes equipped with paper filters which flew over the atoll after the tests. Whereas it was hoped to discover new chemical elements heavier than fermium, those were not found after a series of megaton explosions conducted between 1954 and 1956 at the atoll.

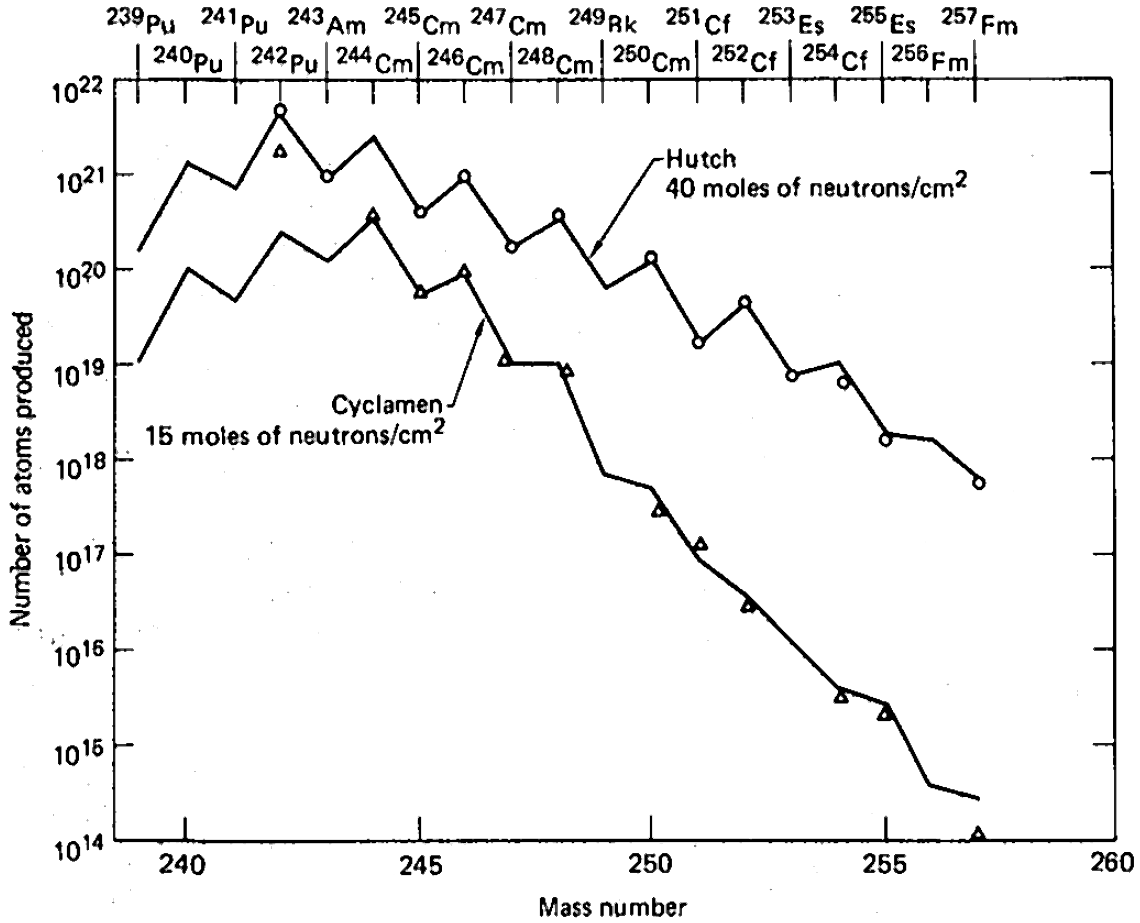
Estimated yield of transuranium elements in the U.S. nuclear tests Hutch and Cyclamen.

The atmospheric results were supplemented by the underground test data accumulated in the 1960s at the Nevada Test Site, as it was hoped that powerful explosions conducted in confined space might result in improved yields and heavier isotopes. Apart from traditional uranium charges, combinations of uranium with americium and thorium have been tried, as well as a mixed plutonium-neptunium charge. They were less successful in terms of yield (of material), which was attributed to stronger losses of heavy isotopes due to enhanced fission rates in heavy-element charges. Isolation of the products was found to be rather problematic, as the explosions were spreading debris through melting and vaporizing rocks under the great depth of 300–600 meters, and drilling to such depth in order to extract the products was both slow and inefficient in terms of collected volumes.

Among the nine underground tests, which were carried between 1962 and 1969 and codenamed Anacostia (5.2 kilotons, 1962), Kennebec (<5 kilotons, 1963), Par (38 kilotons, 1964), Barbel (<20 kilotons, 1964), Tweed (<20 kilotons, 1965), Cyclamen (13 kilotons, 1966), Kankakee (20–200 kilotons, 1966), Vulcan (25 kilotons, 1966) and Hutch (20–200 kilotons, 1969), the last one was most powerful and had the highest yield of transuranium elements. In the dependence on the atomic mass number, the yield showed a saw-tooth behavior with the lower values for odd isotopes, due to their higher fission rates. The major practical problem of the entire proposal, however, was collecting the radioactive debris dispersed by the powerful blast. Aircraft filters adsorbed only about 4×10^{−14} of the total amount and collection of tons of corals at Enewetak Atoll increased this fraction by only two orders of magnitude. Extraction of about 500 kilograms of underground rocks 60 days after the Hutch explosion recovered only about 10^{−7} of the total charge. The amount of transuranium elements in this 500-kg batch was only 30 times higher than in a 0.4 kg rock picked up 7 days after the test. This observation demonstrated the highly nonlinear dependence of the transuranium elements yield on the amount of retrieved radioactive rock. In order to accelerate sample collection after the explosion, shafts were drilled at the site not after but before the test, so that the explosion would expel radioactive material from the epicenter, through the shafts, to collecting volumes near the surface. This method was tried in the Anacostia and Kennebec tests and instantly provided hundreds of kilograms of material, but with actinide concentrations 3 times lower than in samples obtained after drilling; whereas such a method could have been efficient in scientific studies of short-lived isotopes, it could not improve the overall collection efficiency of the produced actinides.

Though no new elements (apart from einsteinium and fermium) could be detected in the nuclear test debris, and the total yields of transuranium elements were disappointingly low, these tests did provide significantly higher amounts of rare heavy isotopes than previously available in laboratories. For example, 6×10^{9} atoms of ^{257}Fm could be recovered after the Hutch detonation. They were then used in the studies of thermal-neutron induced fission of ^{257}Fm and in discovery of a new fermium isotope ^{258}Fm. Also, the rare isotope ^{250}Cm was synthesized in large quantities, which is very difficult to produce in nuclear reactors from its progenitor ^{249}Cm; the half-life of ^{249}Cm (64 minutes) is much too short for months-long reactor irradiations, but is very "long" on the explosion timescale.

=== Natural occurrence ===
Because of the short half-life of all known isotopes of fermium, any primordial fermium, that is fermium present on Earth during its formation, has decayed by now. Synthesis of fermium from naturally occurring uranium and thorium in the Earth's crust requires multiple neutron captures, which is extremely unlikely. Therefore, most fermium is produced on Earth in laboratories, high-power nuclear reactors, or in nuclear tests, and is present for only a few months afterward.

The transuranic elements up to fermium should have been present in the natural nuclear fission reactor at Oklo, but any quantities produced then would have long since decayed away.

== Chemistry ==
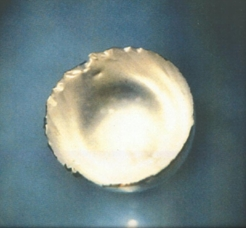
A fermium-ytterbium alloy used for measuring the enthalpy of sublimation of fermium metal

The chemistry of fermium has only been studied in solution using tracer techniques, and no solid compounds have been prepared. Under normal conditions, fermium exists in solution as the Fm^{3+} ion, which has a hydration number of 16.9 and an acid dissociation constant of 1.6×10^{−4} (pK_{a} = 3.8). Fm^{3+} forms complexes with a wide variety of organic ligands with hard donor atoms such as oxygen, and these complexes are usually more stable than those of the preceding actinides. It also forms anionic complexes with ligands such as chloride or nitrate and, again, these complexes appear to be more stable than those formed by einsteinium or californium. It is believed that the bonding in the complexes of the later actinides is mostly ionic in character: the Fm^{3+} ion is expected to be smaller than the preceding An^{3+} ions because of the higher effective nuclear charge of fermium, and hence fermium would be expected to form shorter and stronger metal–ligand bonds.

Fermium(III) can be fairly easily reduced to fermium(II), for example with samarium(II) chloride, with which fermium(II) coprecipitates. In the precipitate, the compound fermium(II) chloride (FmCl_{2}) was produced, though it was not purified or studied in isolation. The electrode potential has been estimated to be similar to that of the ytterbium(III)/(II) couple, or about −1.15 V with respect to the standard hydrogen electrode, a value which agrees with theoretical calculations. The Fm^{2+}/Fm^{0} couple has an electrode potential of −2.37(10) V based on polarographic measurements.

The enthalpy of sublimation, measured through testing of fermium alloys, is calculated at 33.8±3 kcal/mol (141.4±12.6 kJ/mol) derived from Second Law values, and 34.8 kcal/mol (145.6 kJ/mol) derived from Third Law values, both at 298 K. Through this, fermium is considered a divalent metal.

== Toxicity ==
Though few people come in contact with fermium, the International Commission on Radiological Protection has set annual exposure limits for the two most stable isotopes. For fermium-253, the ingestion limit was set at 10^{7} becquerels (1 Bq equals one decay per second), and the inhalation limit at 10^{5} Bq; for fermium-257, at 10^{5} Bq and 4,000 Bq respectively.
