= Erbium oxychloride =

Inorganic chemical compound

Names
- IUPAC name chloro(oxo)erbium
- Other names Erbium oxide chloride

Identifiers
| 3D model (JSmol) | Interactive image |
- InChI: InChI=1S/ClH.Er.O/h1H;;/q;+3;-2/p-1 Key: ZCVMXSWDZQFSBG-UHFFFAOYSA-M
- SMILES: [Cl-].[Er+3].[O-2]

Properties
| Chemical formula | ErOCl |
| Appearance | crystals |

Structure
| Crystal structure | tetragonal |
| Space group | P4/nmm |

Related compounds
| Related compounds | Lanthanum oxychloride; Neodymium oxychloride; Samarium oxychloride; Holmium oxychloride |
- Except where otherwise noted, data are given for materials in their standard state (at 25 °C [77 °F], 100 kPa). Infobox references

Erbium oxychloride or erbium oxide chloride is an inorganic compound of erbium, oxygen, and chlorine with the chemical formula ErOCl.

== Synthesis ==
The compound can be obtained by reacting Er_{2}O_{3} solution with fused magnesium chloride.

== Physical properties ==
The compound forms crystals of the tetragonal system, space group P4/nmm.
