= Plutonium oxyfluoride =

Names
- Other names Plutonium oxide fluoride

Identifiers
3D model (JSmol)	Interactive image
- InChI: InChI=1S/FH.O.Pu/h1H;;/q;-2;+3/p-1 Key: MBMNUTPHGDIIRF-UHFFFAOYSA-M
- SMILES: [F-].[O-2].[Pu+3]

Properties
Chemical formula	PuOF
Molar mass	279 g/mol
Appearance	metallic crystals
Density	9.76 g/cm^{3}
Solubility in water	insoluble

Structure
Crystal structure	Cubic

Related compounds
Related compounds	Lanthanum oxyfluoride Neodymium oxyfluoride
- Except where otherwise noted, data are given for materials in their standard state (at 25 °C [77 °F], 100 kPa). Infobox references

Plutonium oxyfluoride is an inorganic compound of plutonium, oxygen, and fluorine with the chemical formula PuOF.

== Synthesis ==
Plutonium oxyfluoride may be produced by the reduction of plutonium(IV) fluoride with oxygen admixture:

2PuF_{4} + 3H_{2} + O_{2} → 2PuOF + 6HF

== Physical properties ==
PuOF forms gray crystals of the cubic crystal system with metallic luster, cell parameters a = 0.571 nm, Z = 4, structure type CaF_{2}.

Plutonium oxyfluoride does not dissolve in water.
