= Fermium(II) chloride =

Names
- Other names Fermium dichloride

Identifiers
CAS Number	72561-92-3
3D model (JSmol)	Interactive image
- InChI: InChI=1/2ClH.Fm/h2*1H;/q;;+2/p-2
- SMILES: [Fm+2].[Cl-].[Cl-]

Properties
Chemical formula	Cl_{2}Fm
Molar mass	328 g·mol^{−1}
Appearance	solid
- Except where otherwise noted, data are given for materials in their standard state (at 25 °C [77 °F], 100 kPa). Infobox references

Fermium(II) chloride is a chemical compound with the chemical formula FmCl_{2}. Due to fermium's scarcity and high radioactivity, fermium dichloride has not been synthesized or thoroughly studied in macroscopic quantities. However, theoretical and limited experimental studies suggest possible properties based on its position in the actinide series.

== Physical properties ==
The compound co-crystallises with samarium dichloride (SmCl_{2}).
