= Thorium(IV) fluoride =

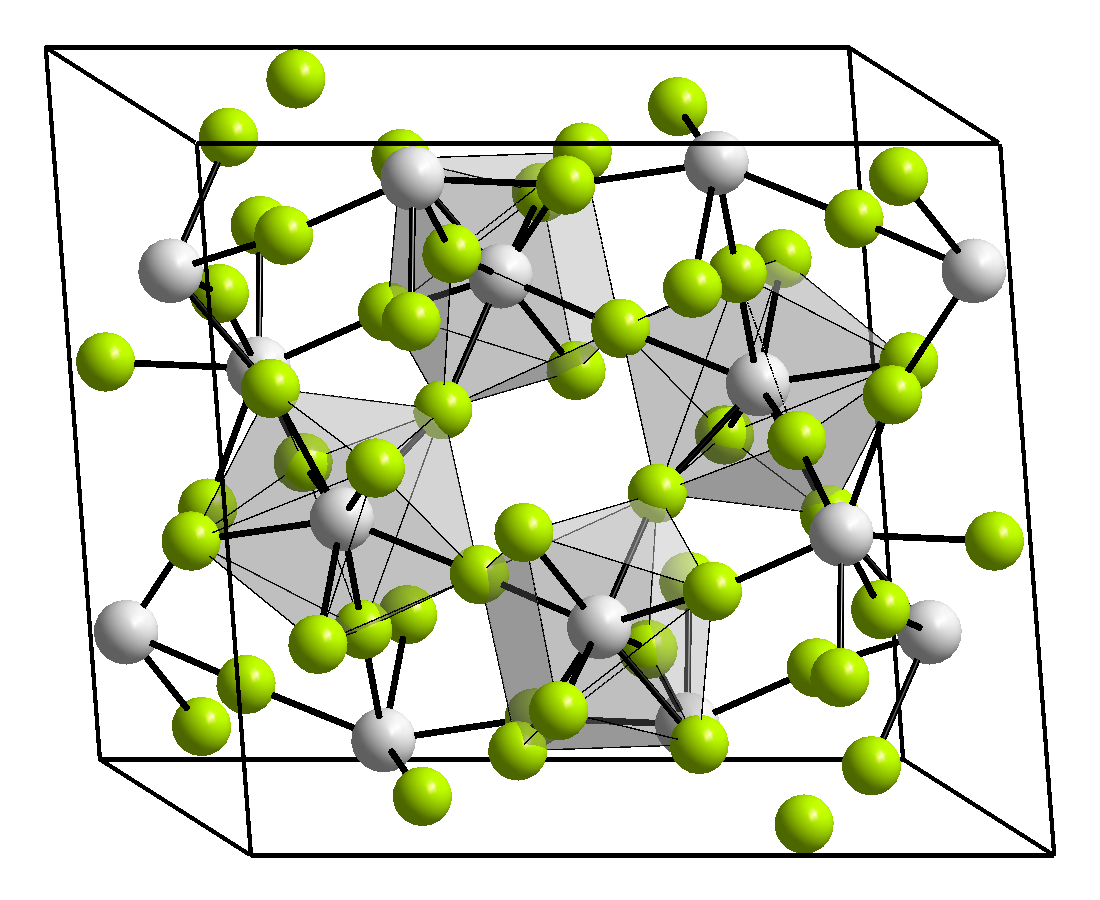
- Thorium(IV) fluoride Thorium tetrafluoride

Identifiers
CAS Number	13709-59-6
3D model (JSmol)	Interactive image
ChemSpider	75503
ECHA InfoCard	100.033.857
EC Number	237-259-6
PubChem CID	83680
CompTox Dashboard (EPA)	DTXSID7065596
- InChI: InChI=1S/4FH.Th/h4*1H;/q;;;;+4/p-4
- SMILES: F[Th](F)(F)F

Properties
Chemical formula	ThF_{4}
Molar mass	308.03 g/mol
Appearance	white crystals
Density	6.3 g/cm^{3}
Melting point	1,110 °C (2,030 °F; 1,380 K)
Boiling point	1,680 °C (3,060 °F; 1,950 K)
Refractive index (n_{D})	1.56

Structure
Crystal structure	Monoclinic, mS60
Space group	C12/c1, No. 15

Hazards
Flash point	Non-flammable

Related compounds
Other anions	Thorium(IV) chloride Thorium(IV) bromide Thorium(IV) iodide
Other cations	Protactinium(IV) fluoride Uranium(IV) fluoride Neptunium(IV) fluoride Plutonium(IV) fluoride
Related compounds	Thorium dioxide
- Except where otherwise noted, data are given for materials in their standard state (at 25 °C [77 °F], 100 kPa). verify (what is ?) Infobox references

Thorium(IV) fluoride (ThF_{4}) is an inorganic chemical compound. It is a white hygroscopic powder which can be produced by reacting thorium with fluorine gas. At temperatures above 500 °C, it reacts with atmospheric moisture to produce ThOF_{2}.

== Uses ==
Despite its (mild) radioactivity, thorium fluoride is used as an antireflection material in multilayered optical coatings. It has excellent optical transparency in the range 0.35–12 μm, and its radiation is primarily due to alpha particles, which can be easily stopped by a thin cover layer of another material. However, like all alpha emitters, thorium is potentially hazardous if incorporated, which means safety should focus on reducing or eliminating this danger. In addition to its radioactivity, thorium is also a chemically toxic heavy metal.

Thorium fluoride was used in making carbon arc lamps, which provided high-intensity illumination for movie projectors and search lights.

== See also ==
- Liquid fluoride thorium reactor
