= Promethium(III) hydroxide =

Identifiers
CAS Number	13779-13-0
3D model (JSmol)	Interactive image
ChemSpider	129559250
CompTox Dashboard (EPA)	DTXSID701336475
- InChI: InChI=1S/3H2O.Pm/h3*1H2;/q;;;+3/p-3 Key: HXMRPTXJQXYIQY-UHFFFAOYSA-K
- SMILES: [Pm+3].[OH-].[OH-].[OH-]

Properties
Chemical formula	Pm(OH)_{3}
Appearance	purplish-pink solid
Density	5.1 g/cm^{3}

Structure
Crystal structure	hexagonal
Lattice constant	a = 6.39 Å, c = 3.68 Å

Related compounds
Other anions	promethium oxide
Other cations	neodymium(III) hydroxide samarium(III) hydroxide
- Except where otherwise noted, data are given for materials in their standard state (at 25 °C [77 °F], 100 kPa). Infobox references

Promethium(III) hydroxide is an inorganic compound with a chemical formula Pm(OH)_{3}. It is a radioactive compound.

== Production ==
Promethium(III) hydroxide can be produced by reacting ammonia water with a solution of a promethium(III) salt, from which promethium(III) hydroxide precipitates as a purplish-pink amorphous solid. By heating with water, it can be forced to crystallize, giving hexagonal crystals isomorphous with other rare earth hydroxides:

Pm^{3+} + 3OH^{−} → Pm(OH)_{3}↓
