= Markó–Lam deoxygenation =

Reaction in organic chemistry

The Markó–Lam deoxygenation is an organic chemistry reaction where the hydroxy functional group in an organic compound is replaced by a hydrogen atom to give an alkyl group. The Markó-Lam reaction is a variant of the Bouveault–Blanc reduction and an alternative to the classical Barton–McCombie deoxygenation. It is named for the Belgian chemists István Markó and Kevin Lam.

The main features of the reaction are:

- short reaction time (5 seconds to 5 minutes).
- the use of a stable toluate derivative.
- the use of SmI_{2}/HMPA system or electrolysis instead of the classical and difficult to remove tributyltin hydride.

The Marko-Lam deoxygenation

== Mechanism ==
A hydroxyl group is first derivitised into a stable and very often crystalline toluate derivative. The aromatic ester is submitted to a monoelectronical reduction, by the use of SmI_{2}/HMPA or by electrolysis, to yield the a radical-anion which decomposes into the corresponding carboxylate and into the radical of the alkyl fragment.

The Marko-Lam deoxygenation

This radical could be used for further chemical reactions or can abstract a hydrogen atom to form the deoxygenated product.

== Variations ==
In presence of methanol or isopropanol, the reduction leads to the selective deprotection of the aromatic esters.

The Markó-Lam deoxygenation

In presence of ketones, allylic derivatives lead to the coupling product when treated in Barbier's conditions with samarium diiodide.

The Marko-Lam deoxygenation

== Scope ==
The Markó-Lam reaction was used as a final step in the total synthesis of Trifarienol B:

Synthesis of Trifarienol B employing the Marko-Lam deoxygenation
