= Samarium(II) bromide =

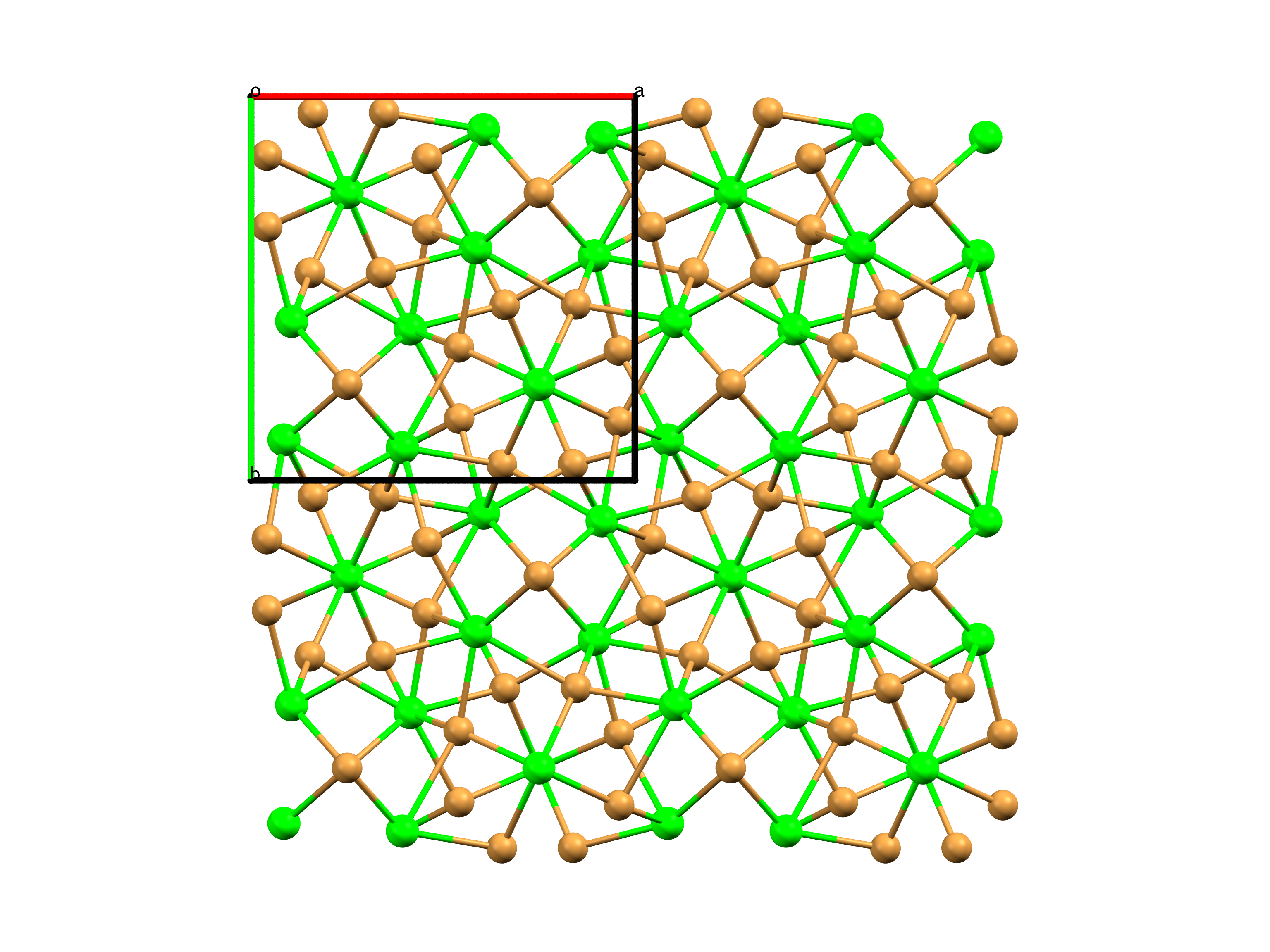

Names
- IUPAC name samarium(II) bromide
- Other names samarium dibromide dibromosamarium

Identifiers
CAS Number	50801-97-3
3D model (JSmol)	Interactive image
ChemSpider	10008489
PubChem CID	11833842
CompTox Dashboard (EPA)	DTXSID701312845
- InChI: InChI=1S/2BrH.Sm/h2*1H;/q;;+2/p-2 Key: AEPYKHCUOAUXAI-UHFFFAOYSA-L
- SMILES: Br[Sm]Br

Properties
Chemical formula	SmBr_{2}
Molar mass	310.17 g/mol
Appearance	Brown crystals
Melting point	669 °C (1,236 °F; 942 K)
Boiling point	1,880 °C (3,420 °F; 2,150 K)
Magnetic susceptibility (χ)	+5337.0·10^{−6} cm^{3}/mol

Structure
Crystal structure	SrBr_{2}

Hazards
- GHS labelling
Pictograms	(GHS07: Exclamation mark)
Signal word	Warning
Hazard statements	H315, H319, H335
Precautionary statements	P261, P305+P351+P338

Related compounds
Other anions	Samarium(II) chloride Samarium(II) iodide
Other cations	Samarium(III) bromide
- Except where otherwise noted, data are given for materials in their standard state (at 25 °C [77 °F], 100 kPa). Infobox references

Samarium(II) bromide is an inorganic compound with the chemical formula SmBr_{2}. It is a brown solid that is insoluble in most solvents but degrades readily in air.

== Structure ==
In the gas phase, SmBr_{2} is a bent molecule with Sm–Br distance 274.5 pm and bond angle 131±6°.

== History ==
Samarium(II) bromide was first synthesized in 1934 by P. W. Selwood, when he reduced samarium tribromide (SmBr_{3}) with hydrogen (H_{2}). Kagan also synthesized it by converting samarium(III) oxide (Sm_{2}O_{3}) to SmBr_{3} and then reducing with a lithium dispersion in THF. Robert A. Flowers synthesized it by adding two equivalent of lithium bromide (LiBr) to samarium diiodide (SmI_{2}) in tetrahydrofuran. Namy managed to synthesize it by mixing tetrabromoethane (C_{2}H_{2}Br_{4}) with samarium metal, and Hilmerson found that heating the tetrabromoethane or samarium greatly improved the production of samarium(II) bromide.

== Reactions ==
Samarium(II) bromide has reducing properties reminiscent of the more commonly used samarium diiodide. It is an effective for pinacol homocouplings of aldehydes, ketones, and cross-coupling carbonyl compounds. Reports have shown that samarium(II) bromide is capable of selectively reducing ketones if it is in the presence of an alkyl halide.

Samarium(II) bromide forms soluble adducts with hexamethylphosphoramide. This species reduces imines to amines and alkyl chlorides to hydrocarbons. For example, SmBr_{2}(hmpa)_{x} converts cyclohexyl chloride to cyclohexane.

Samarium(II) bromide will reduce ketones in tetrahydrofuran if an activator is absent.
