= Thorium oxyfluoride =

Names
- Other names: Thorium difluoride oxide; Thorium fluoride oxide; Thorium(IV) difluorideoxide

Identifiers
CAS Number	13597-30-3
3D model (JSmol)	Interactive image
ChemSpider	21428670
EC Number	237-045-2
PubChem CID	25022211
CompTox Dashboard (EPA)	DTXSID1065554
- InChI: InChI=1S/2FH.O.Th/h2*1H;;/q;;;+2/p-2 Key: KXAYMKGDXBMOAK-UHFFFAOYSA-L
- SMILES: [Th](F)(F)=O

Properties
Chemical formula	ThOF_{2}
Molar mass	286.034 g/mol
Appearance	white powder
Solubility in water	insoluble

Related compounds
Related compounds	Lanthanum oxyfluoride
- Except where otherwise noted, data are given for materials in their standard state (at 25 °C [77 °F], 100 kPa). Infobox references

Thorium oxyfluoride is an inorganic compound of thorium metal, fluorine, and oxygen with the chemical formula ThOF_{2}.

== Synthesis ==
- Thorium oxyfluoride can be prepared from partial hydrolysis of thorium tetrafluoride in moist air at elevated temperatures, about 1000 °C.

ThF_{4} + H_{2}O → ThOF_{2} + 2 HF

- Reaction of thorium tetrafluoride with thorium dioxide at 600 °C:

ThF_{4} + ThO_{2} → 2 ThOF_{2}

== Physical properties ==
The compound forms a white, insoluble amorphous powder.

== Uses ==
The compound is used as a protective coating on reflective surfaces.
