= Cobalt tetrafluoride =

Names
- Other names Cobalt(IV) fluoride

Identifiers
3D model (JSmol)	Interactive image
- InChI: InChI=1S/Co.4FH/h;4*1H/q+4;;;;/p-4 Key: YUARGNWAMBVYOJ-UHFFFAOYSA-J
- SMILES: F[Co](F)(F)F

Properties
Chemical formula	CoF_{4}
Molar mass	134.926807 g·mol^{−1}
- Except where otherwise noted, data are given for materials in their standard state (at 25 °C [77 °F], 100 kPa). Infobox references

Cobalt tetrafluoride is a binary inorganic compound with a chemical formula of CoF_{4}.

== Synthesis ==
Cobalt tetrafluoride was prepared is a gas-phase reaction of fluorination of CoF_{3} by using TbF_{4} as a fluorinating agent.

== Physical properties ==
Cobalt tetrafluoride is too unstable to exist as a solid or liquid, but it is stable in a dilute gas phase.
