= Terbium(IV) fluoride =

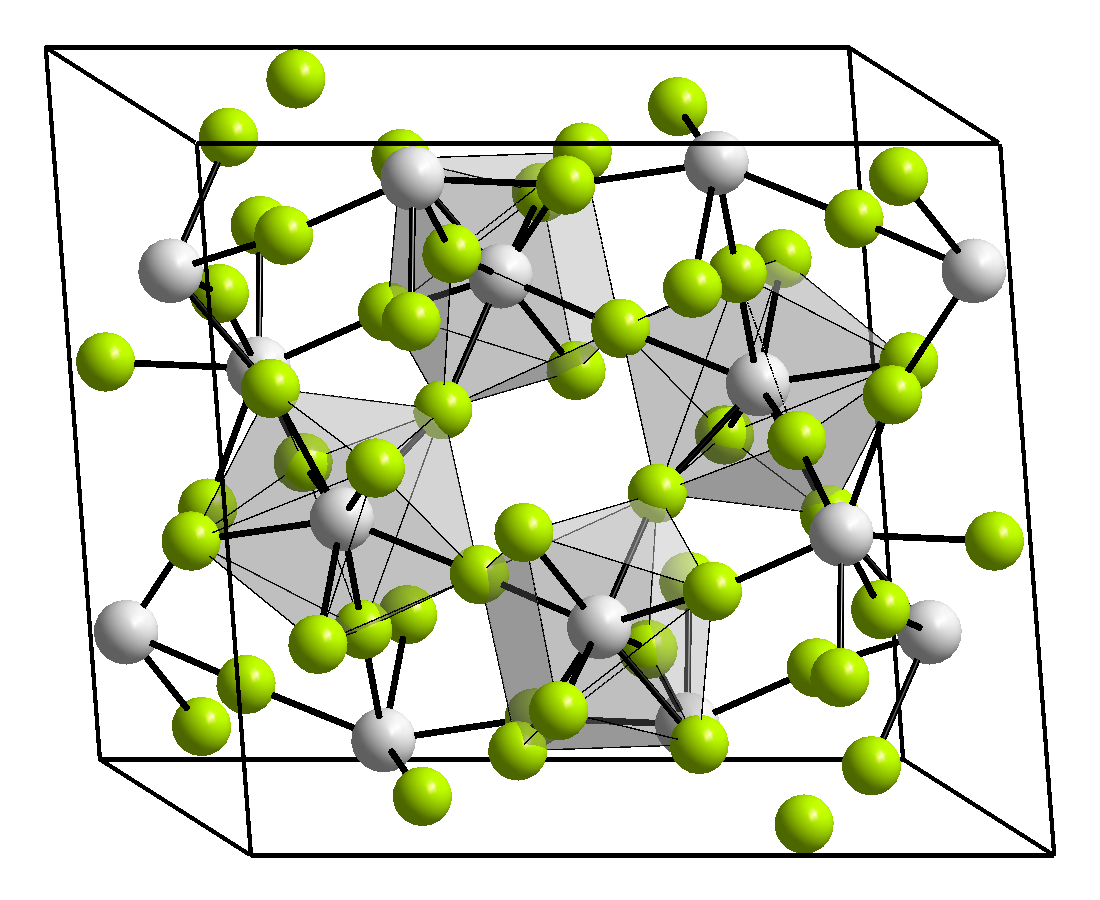

Names
- Other names terbium tetrafluoride

Identifiers
CAS Number	36781-15-4
3D model (JSmol)	Interactive image
ChemSpider	21493830
PubChem CID	90471797
CompTox Dashboard (EPA)	DTXSID001336486
- InChI: InChI=1S/4FH.Tb/h4*1H;/q;;;;+4/p-4 Key: XWMJNWMCMQWTCG-UHFFFAOYSA-J
- SMILES: [F-].[F-].[Tb+4].[F-].[F-]

Properties
Chemical formula	TbF_{4}
Appearance	white solid
- Except where otherwise noted, data are given for materials in their standard state (at 25 °C [77 °F], 100 kPa). Infobox references

Terbium(IV) fluoride is an inorganic compound with a chemical formula TbF_{4}. It is a white solid that is a strong oxidizer. It is also a strong fluorinating agent, emitting relatively pure atomic fluorine when heated, rather than the mixture of fluoride vapors emitted from cobalt(III) fluoride or cerium(IV) fluoride.

== Preparation ==
Terbium(IV) fluoride can be produced by the reaction between very pure terbium(III) fluoride and xenon difluoride, chlorine trifluoride or fluorine gas:

2 TbF_{3} + F_{2} → 2 TbF_{4}

== Properties ==
Terbium(IV) fluoride hydrolyzes quickly in hot water, producing terbium(III) fluoride and terbium oxyfluoride (TbOF). Heating terbium(IV) fluoride will cause it to decompose into terbium(III) fluoride and predominantly monatomic fluorine gas.

TbF_{4} → TbF_{3} + F•↑

The reaction will produce the mixed valence compound Tb(TbF_{5})_{3}, which has the same crystal form as Ln(HfF_{5})_{3}.

Terbium(IV) fluoride can oxidize cobalt trifluoride into cobalt tetrafluoride:

TbF_{4} + CoF_{3} → TbF_{3} + CoF_{4}↑

It can fluoronate [60]fullerene at 320–460 °C.

When terbium(IV) fluoride reacts with potassium chloride and fluorine, it can produce the mixed valence compound KTb_{3}F_{12}. A mixture of rubidium fluoride, aluminium fluoride and terbium(IV) fluoride produces Rb_{2}AlTb_{3}F_{16}.
