= Plutonium(III) oxide =

Names
- Other names Diplutonium trioxide

Identifiers
CAS Number	12036-34-9
3D model (JSmol)	Interactive image
- InChI: InChI=1S/3O.2Pu/q3*-2;2*+3 Key: KNXZYWXJSDQACR-UHFFFAOYSA-N
- SMILES: [O-2].[O-2].[O-2].[Pu+3].[Pu+3]

Properties
Chemical formula	Pu_{2}O_{3}
Molar mass	536 g·mol^{−1}
Density	11 g/cm^{3}
Melting point	2,085 °C (3,785 °F; 2,358 K)

Related compounds
Other anions	Triuranium octoxide; Diuranium pentoxide; Uranium trioxide
- Except where otherwise noted, data are given for materials in their standard state (at 25 °C [77 °F], 100 kPa). Infobox references

Plutonium(III) oxide is an inorganic compound of plutonium and oxygen with the chemical formula Pu_{2}O_{3}. This is a sesquioxide of plutonium and is a lower oxide compared to the more common plutonium dioxide PuO_{2}.

== Synthesis ==
The cubic modification of the compound is formed by thermal dissociation of plutonium dioxide:

2PuO_{2} → Pu_{2}O_{3} + O_{2}

The hexagonal modification is formed during the reduction of plutonium dioxide with metallic plutonium:

2PuO_{2} + Pu → 2Pu_{2}O_{3}

== Physical properties ==
The compound forms black crystals of cubic system, space group I a3.

The compound also forms crystals of hexagohal system, space group P 3m1.

== Chemical properties ==
The compound oxidizes when stored in open air:

2Pu_{2}O_{3} + O_{2} → 4PuO_{2}
