= Samarium oxyfluoride =

Names
- Other names Samarium oxide fluoride

Identifiers
| 3D model (JSmol) | Interactive image |
- InChI: InChI=1S/FH.O.Sm/h1H;;/q;-2;+3/p-1 Key: FZLOLGZNWMCGAF-UHFFFAOYSA-M
- SMILES: [F-].[O-2].[Sm+3]

Properties
| Chemical formula | SmOF |
| Molar mass | 185.36 g/mol |
| Appearance | Crystals |

Structure
| Crystal structure | Hexagonal |
| Space group | R3m |

Related compounds
| Related compounds | Lanthanum oxyfluoride; Neodymium oxyfluoride; Praseodymium oxyfluoride |
- Except where otherwise noted, data are given for materials in their standard state (at 25 °C [77 °F], 100 kPa). Infobox references

Samarium oxyfluoride or samarium oxide fluoride is an inorganic compound of samarium, oxygen, and fluorine with the chemical formula SmOF.

== Physical properties ==
The compound forms crystals of the hexagonal system, space group R3m.
