= Samarium(III) bromide =

Names
- IUPAC name Samarium(III) bromide
- Other names Samarium tribromide Tribromosamarium

Identifiers
CAS Number	13759-87-0
3D model (JSmol)	Interactive image; Interactive image
ChemSpider	75528
ECHA InfoCard	100.033.938
EC Number	237-347-4
PubChem CID	83706
CompTox Dashboard (EPA)	DTXSID4065608
- InChI: InChI=1S/3BrH.6H2O.Sm/h3*1H;6*1H2;/q;;;;;;;;;+3/p-3 Key: LXJDCZVUWJNXRL-UHFFFAOYSA-K
- SMILES: Br[Sm](Br)Br; [Br-].[Br-].[Br-].[Sm+3]

Properties
Chemical formula	SmBr_{3}
Molar mass	390.07 g·mol^{−1}
Appearance	Light yellow solid
Melting point	700 °C (1,292 °F; 973 K)
Magnetic susceptibility (χ)	+972.0·10^{−6} cm^{3}/mol

Hazards
- GHS labelling
Pictograms	(GHS07: Exclamation mark)
Signal word	Warning
Hazard statements	H315, H319, H335
Precautionary statements	P261, P305+P351+P338

Related compounds
Other anions	Samarium(III) fluoride Samarium(III) chloride
Other cations	Samarium(II) bromide
- Except where otherwise noted, data are given for materials in their standard state (at 25 °C [77 °F], 100 kPa). Infobox references

Samarium(III) bromide is a crystalline compound of one samarium and three bromine atoms with the chemical formula of SmBr_{3}. The compound has a crystal structure isotypic to that of plutonium(III) bromide.

== Preparation ==
SmBr_{3}·6H_{2}O can be crystallized by dissolving samarium oxide in 40% hydrobromic acid. The hydrate and ammonium bromide are heated in a vacuum to obtain the anhydrous form of samarium(III) bromide.

== Other compounds ==
Samarium(III) bromide forms some compounds with hydrazine, such as SmBr_{3}·3N_{2}H_{4}·H_{2}O which is a pale yellow needle-shaped crystal that is soluble in water and ethanol but insoluble in benzene, with d_{20 °C} = 3.147 g/cm^{3}.
