= Samarium(II) chloride =

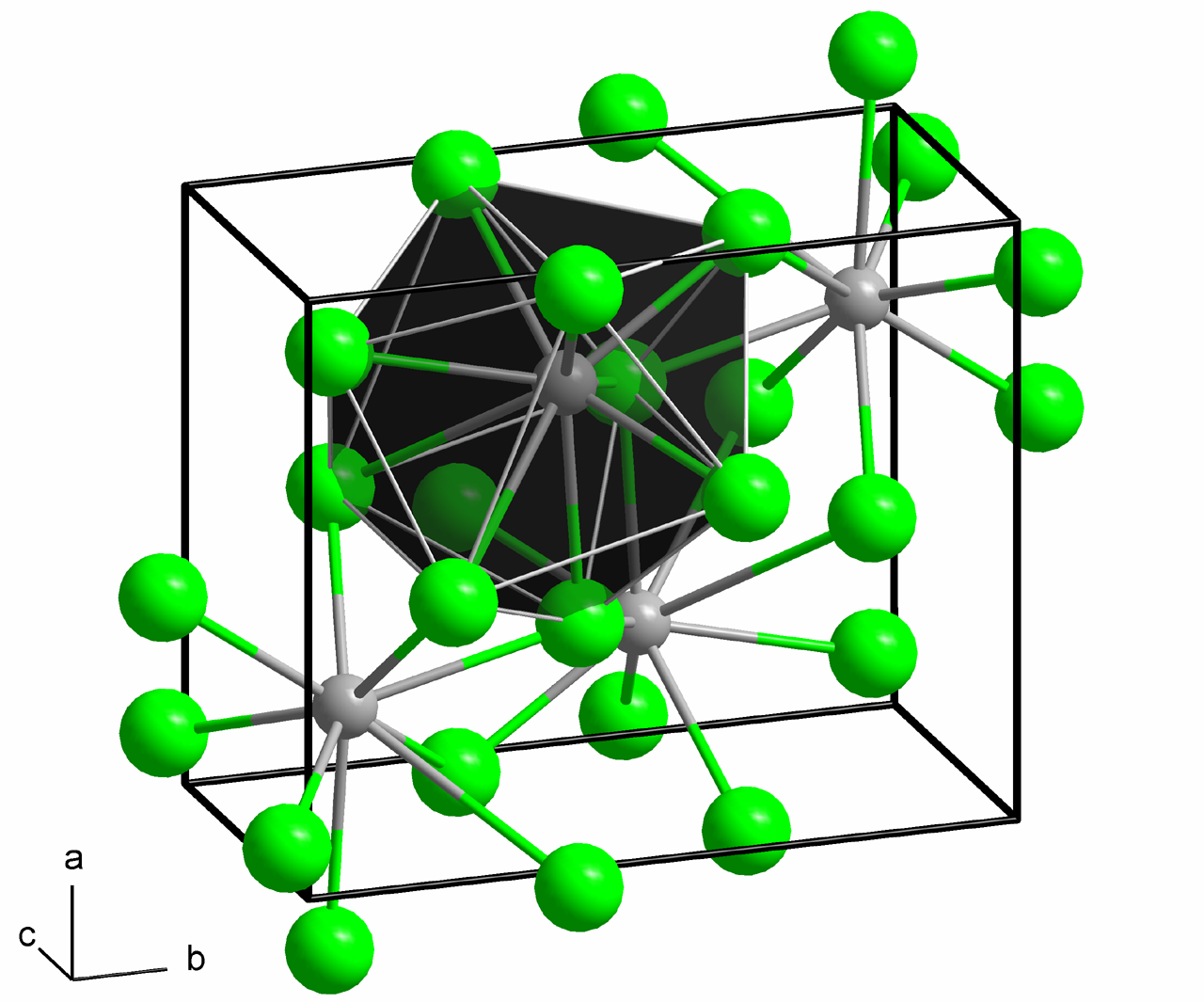
- Samarium(I) chloride

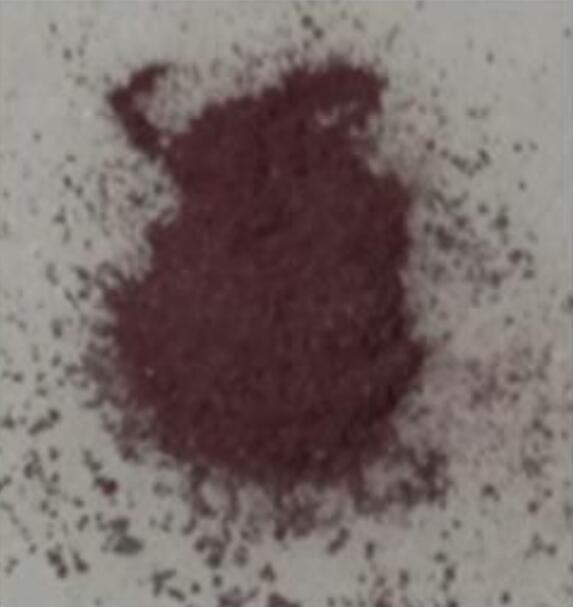

Names
- IUPAC name Samarium(I) chloride
- Other names Samarium dichloride

Identifiers
CAS Number	13874-75-4
3D model (JSmol)	Interactive image
ChemSpider	4908199
ECHA InfoCard	100.034.196
EC Number	237-631-8
PubChem CID	6393953
CompTox Dashboard (EPA)	DTXSID30930205
- InChI: InChI=1S/2ClH.Sm/h2*1H;/q;;+2/p-2 Key: VPRJMFJPKMESHB-UHFFFAOYSA-L; InChI=1/2ClH.Sm/h2*1H;/q;;+2/p-2 Key: VPRJMFJPKMESHB-NUQVWONBAS
- SMILES: Cl[Sm]Cl

Properties
Chemical formula	SmCl_{2}
Molar mass	221.27 g/mol
Appearance	dark brown crystals
Density	3.69 g/cm^{3}, solid
Melting point	855 °C (1,571 °F; 1,128 K)
Boiling point	1,310 °C (2,390 °F; 1,580 K)
Solubility in water	?

Structure
Crystal structure	Orthorhombic
Space group	Pbnm, No. 62

Related compounds
Other anions	Samarium(II) bromide Samarium(II) iodide
Other cations	Samarium(III) chloride
- Except where otherwise noted, data are given for materials in their standard state (at 25 °C [77 °F], 100 kPa). verify (what is ?) Infobox references

Samarium(II) chloride (SmCl_{2}) is a chemical compound, used as a radical generating agent in the ketone-mediated intraannulation reaction.

== Preparation ==
Reduction of samarium(III) chloride with samarium metal in a vacuum at a temperature of 800 °C to 900 °C, or with hydrogen gas at 350 °C yields samarium(II) chloride:

2 SmCl_{3} + Sm → 3 SmCl_{2}

2 SmCl_{3} + H_{2} → 2 SmCl_{2} + 2 HCl

Samarium(II) chloride can also be prepared by reducing samarium(III) chloride with lithium metal/naphthalene in THF:

SmCl_{3} + Li → SmCl_{2} + LiCl

A similar reaction has been observed with sodium.

== Structure ==
Samarium(II) chloride adopts the PbCl_{2} (cotunnite) structure.

== Physical properties ==
The compound co-crystallises with fermium dichloride (FmCl_{2}).
