= Samarium(II) iodide =

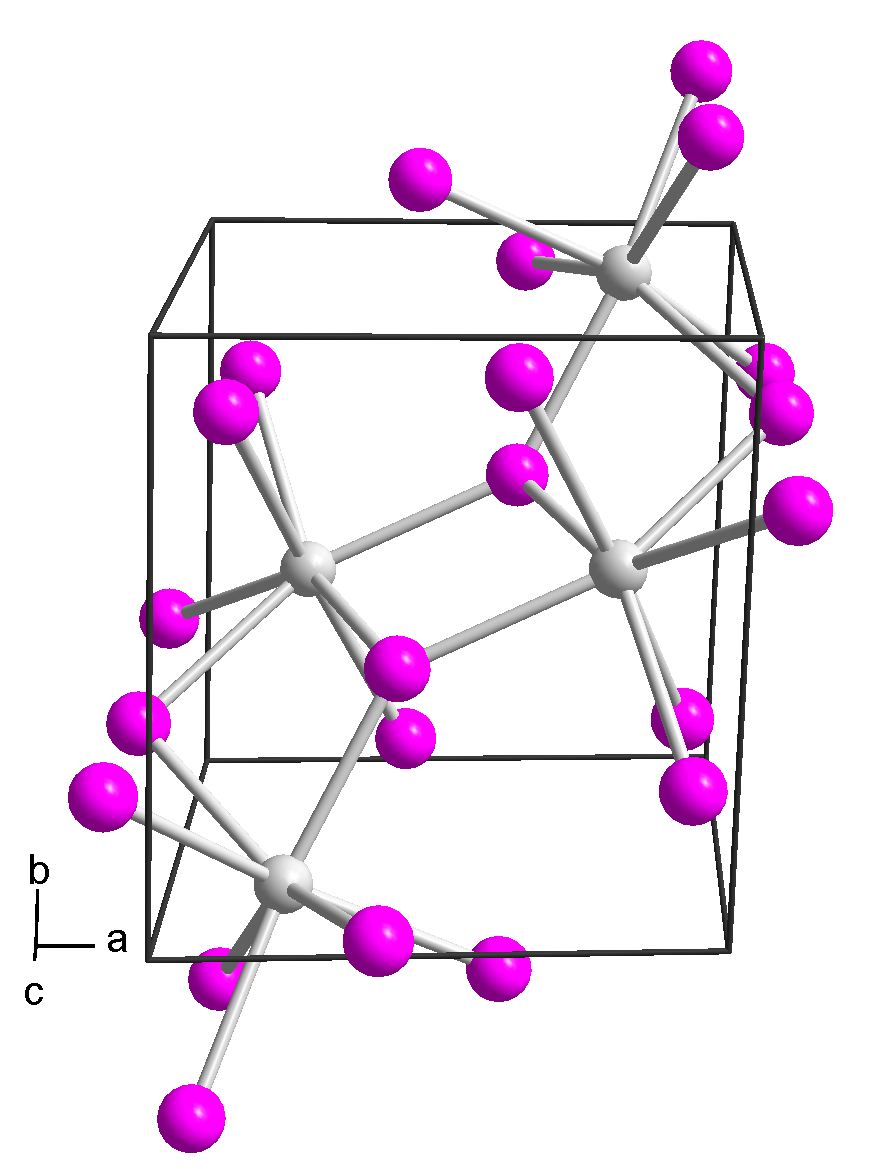
- Ball-and-stick model of a samarium(II) iodide-THF complex

Names
- IUPAC name samarium(II) iodide
- Other names samarium diiodide

Identifiers
CAS Number	32248-43-4
3D model (JSmol)	Interactive image
ChemSpider	125002
PubChem CID	141689
UNII	L15T8U41LC
CompTox Dashboard (EPA)	DTXSID80893790
- InChI: InChI=1S/2HI.Sm/h2*1H;/q;;+2/p-2 Key: UAWABSHMGXMCRK-UHFFFAOYSA-L; InChI=1/2HI.Sm/h2*1H;/q;;+2/p-2 Key: UAWABSHMGXMCRK-NUQVWONBAD
- SMILES: I[Sm]I

Properties
Chemical formula	SmI_{2}
Molar mass	404.16 g/mol
Appearance	green solid
Melting point	520 °C (968 °F; 793 K)

Hazards
Flash point	Non-flammable

Related compounds
Other anions	Samarium(II) chloride Samarium(II) bromide
Other cations	Samarium(III) iodide Europium(II) iodide
- Except where otherwise noted, data are given for materials in their standard state (at 25 °C [77 °F], 100 kPa). verify (what is ?) Infobox references

Samarium(II) iodide is an inorganic compound with the formula SmI_{2}. When employed as a solution for organic synthesis, it is known as Kagan's reagent, named after Henri B. Kagan. SmI_{2} is a green solid and forms a dark blue solution in THF. It is a strong one-electron reducing agent that is used in organic synthesis.

== Structure ==
In solid samarium(II) iodide, the metal centers are seven-coordinate with a face-capped octahedral geometry.

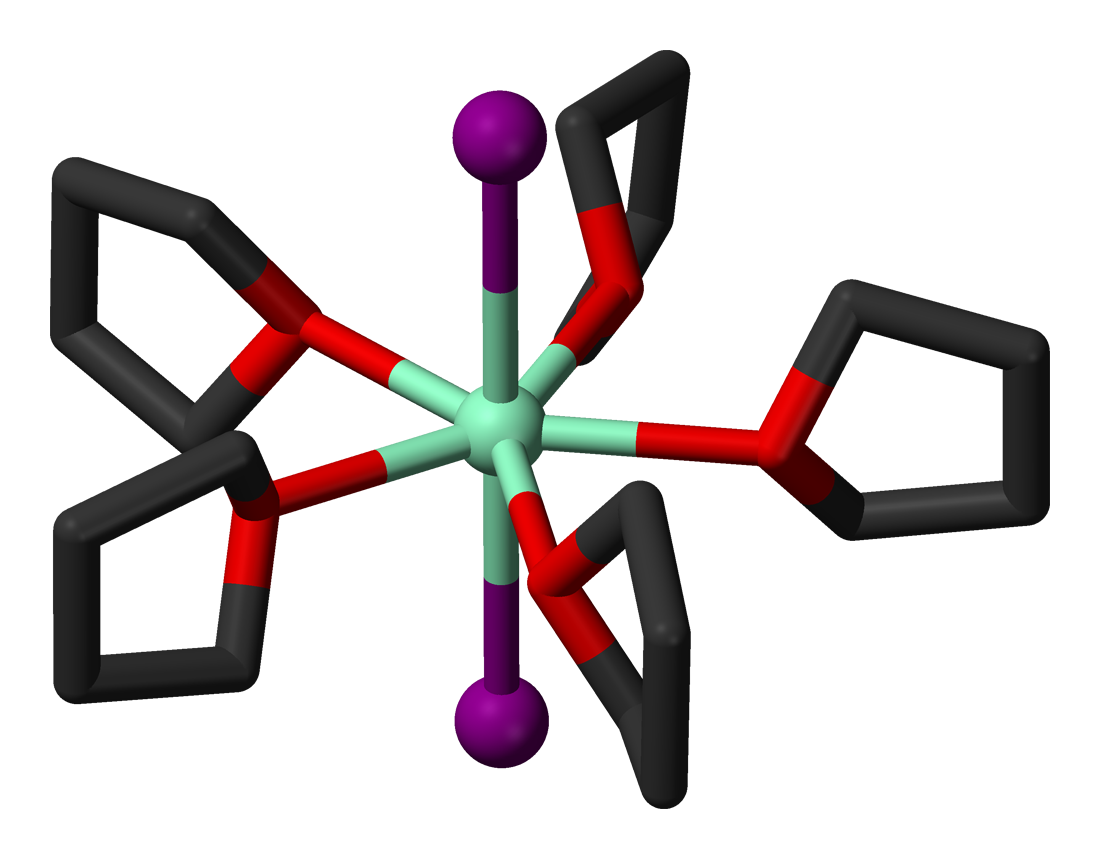
Structure of the samarium(II) iodide-tetrahydrofuran complex

In its ether adducts, samarium remains heptacoordinate with five ether and two terminal iodide ligands.

== Preparation ==
Samarium iodide is easily prepared in nearly quantitative yields from samarium metal using diiodomethane, 1,2-diiodoethane, or molecular iodine, typically using THF as solvent. The resulting solutions are most often used directly, without isolation of the inorganic reagent itself.

Sm + ICH_{2}I → SmI_{2} + 0.5 H_{2}C=CH_{2}
Sm + I(CH_{2})_{2}I → SmI_{2} + H_{2}C=CH_{2}
Sm + I_{2} → SmI_{2}

Solid, solvent-free SmI_{2} forms by high temperature decomposition of samarium(III) iodide (SmI_{3}).

== Reactions ==
Samarium(II) iodide is a powerful reducing agent – for example it rapidly reduces water to hydrogen. It is available commercially as a dark blue 0.1 M solution in THF. Although used typically in superstoichiometric amounts, catalytic applications have been described.

=== Organic chemistry ===
Samarium(II) iodide is a reagent for carbon-carbon bond formation, for example in a Barbier reaction (similar to the Grignard reaction) between a ketone and an alkyl iodide to form a tertiary alcohol:

R^{1}I + R^{2}COR^{3} → R^{1}R^{2}C(OH)R^{3}

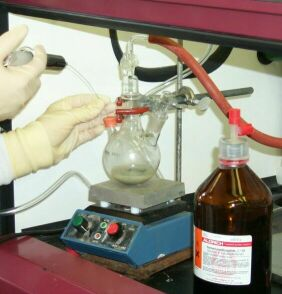
Barbier reaction using SmI_{2}

Typical reaction conditions use SmI_{2} in THF in the presence of catalytic NiI_{2}.

Esters react similarly (adding two R groups), but aldehydes give by-products. The reaction is convenient in that it is often very rapid (5 minutes or less in the cold). Although samarium(II) iodide is considered a powerful single-electron reducing agent, it does display remarkable chemoselectivity among functional groups. For example, sulfones and sulfoxides can be reduced to the corresponding sulfide in the presence of a variety of carbonyl-containing functionalities (such as esters, ketones, amides, aldehydes, etc.). This is presumably due to the considerably slower reaction with carbonyls as compared to sulfones and sulfoxides. Furthermore, hydrodehalogenation of halogenated hydrocarbons to the corresponding hydrocarbon compound can be achieved using samarium(II) iodide. Also, it can be monitored by the color change that occurs as the dark blue color of SmI_{2} in THF discharges to a light yellow once the reaction has occurred. The picture shows the dark colour disappearing immediately upon contact with the Barbier reaction mixture.

Work-up is with dilute hydrochloric acid, and the samarium is removed as aqueous Sm^{3+}.

Carbonyl compounds can also be coupled with simple alkenes to form five, six or eight membered rings.

Tosyl groups can be removed from N-tosylamides almost instantaneously, using SmI_{2} in conjunction with distilled water and an amine base. The reaction is even effective for deprotection of sensitive substrates such as aziridines:

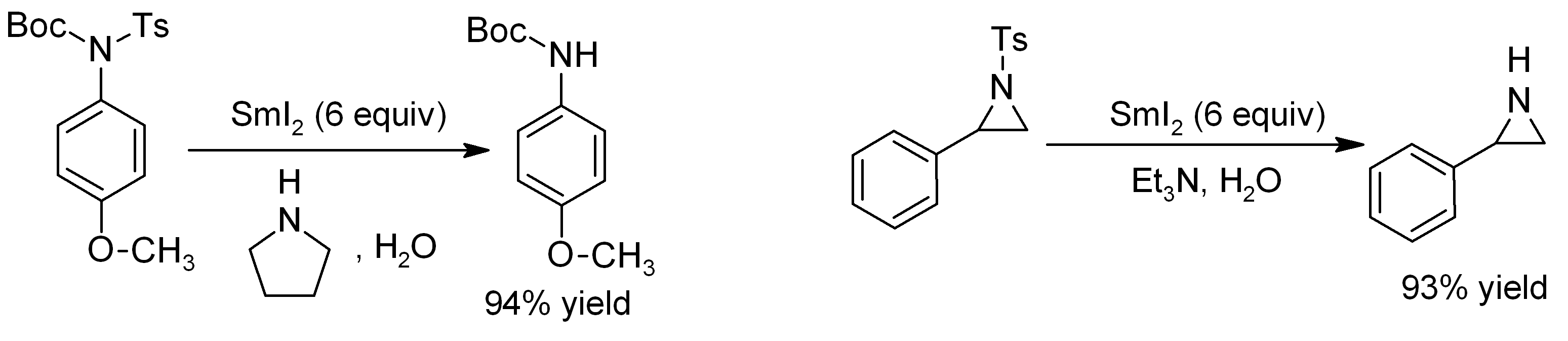
Removal of a tosyl group from an N-tosylamide using SmI_{2}

In the Markó-Lam deoxygenation, an alcohol could be almost instantaneously deoxygenated by reducing their toluate ester in presence of SmI_{2}.

Markó-Lam deoxygenation using SmI_{2}

SmI_{2} can also be used in the transannulation of bicyclic molecules. An example is the SmI_{2} induced ketone - alkene cyclization of 5-methylenecyclooctanone which proceeds through a ketyl intermediate:

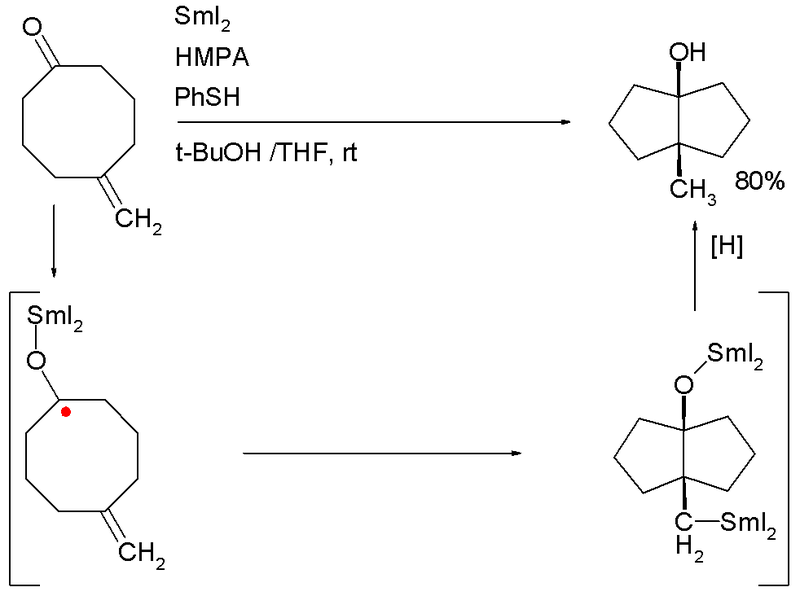

The applications of SmI_{2} have been reviewed. The book Organic Synthesis Using Samarium Diiodide, published in 2009, gives a detailed overview of reactions mediated by SmI_{2}.
