= Samarium(III) iodide =

Names
- Other names Triiodosamarium, Samarium triiodide

Identifiers
CAS Number	13813-25-7; 75179-64-5 (nonahydrate)
3D model (JSmol)	Interactive image
ECHA InfoCard	100.034.048
EC Number	237-468-2
PubChem CID	83746
CompTox Dashboard (EPA)	DTXSID5065643
- InChI: InChI=1S/3HI.Sm/h3*1H;/q;;;+3/p-3 Key: XQKBFQXWZCFNFF-UHFFFAOYSA-K
- SMILES: I[Sm](I)I

Properties
Chemical formula	SmI_{3}
Molar mass	531.1
Appearance	orange-yellow crystals
Melting point	850 °C (1,560 °F; 1,120 K)
Solubility in water	decomposes in water

Hazards
- GHS labelling
Signal word	Danger

Related compounds
Related compounds	Samarium(II) iodide
- Except where otherwise noted, data are given for materials in their standard state (at 25 °C [77 °F], 100 kPa). Infobox references

Samarium(III) iodide is an inorganic compound, a salt of samarium and hydroiodic acid with the chemical formula SmI_{3}.

== Synthesis ==
Samarium(III) iodide is prepared by the reaction of metallic samarium and iodine:

2 Sm + 3 I_{2} → 2 SmI_{3}

== Properties ==
Samarium(III) iodide is a yellow powder that is unstable in air and decomposes in water (hydrolysis). When heated with metallic samarium, it forms samarium diiodide:

2SmI_{3} + Sm → 3 SmI_{2}

Reduction by hydrogen also affords samarium diiodide upon heating:

2 SmI_{3} + H_{2} → 2 SmI_{2} + 2 HI

== Applications ==
The compound is commercially available and used in organic reactions as a catalyst.
