= Praseodymium oxyfluoride =

Names
- Other names Praseodymium oxide fluoride

Identifiers
3D model (JSmol)	Interactive image
- InChI: InChI=1S/FH.O.Pr/h1H;;/q;-2;+3/p-1 Key: ZHZFERGDXNTFPF-UHFFFAOYSA-M
- SMILES: [F-].[O-2].[Pr+3]

Properties
Chemical formula	PrOF
Molar mass	175.905 g/mol
Appearance	crystals

Structure
Crystal structure	Hexagonal
Space group	P3m

Related compounds
Related compounds	Lanthanum oxyfluoride; Neodymium oxyfluoride; Holmium oxyfluoride
- Except where otherwise noted, data are given for materials in their standard state (at 25 °C [77 °F], 100 kPa). Infobox references

Praseodymium oxyfluoride or praseodymium oxide fluoride is an inorganic compound of praseodymium, oxygen, and fluorine with the chemical formula PrOF.

== Physical properties ==
The compound forms crystals of hexagonal system, space group P3m.
