= Holmium oxychloride =

Names
- Other names: Holmium oxide chloride; Holmium(III) oxychloride

Identifiers
3D model (JSmol)	Interactive image
- InChI: InChI=1S/ClH.Ho.O/h1H;;/q;+3;-2/p-1 Key: PSLCQZBYWJDMHI-UHFFFAOYSA-M
- SMILES: [Cl-].[Ho+3].[O-2]

Properties
Chemical formula	ClHoO
Molar mass	216.38 g·mol^{−1}
Appearance	crystals
Density	7.23 g/cm^{3}

Structure
Crystal structure	tetragonal
Space group	P4nmm

Related compounds
Related compounds	Praseodymium oxychloride; Neodymium oxychloride; Lanthanum oxychloride; Plutonium oxychloride
- Except where otherwise noted, data are given for materials in their standard state (at 25 °C [77 °F], 100 kPa). Infobox references

Holmium oxyfluoride is an inorganic compound of holmium, oxygen, and chlorine with the chemical formula HoOCl.

== Synthesis ==
Decomposition of holmium(III) chloride crystallohydrate by heating:

HoCl_{3}·6H_{2}O → HoOCl + 2HCl + 5H_{2}O

== Physical properties ==
The compound forms crystals of the tetragonal system, space group P4nmm.
