= Promethium(III) fluoride =

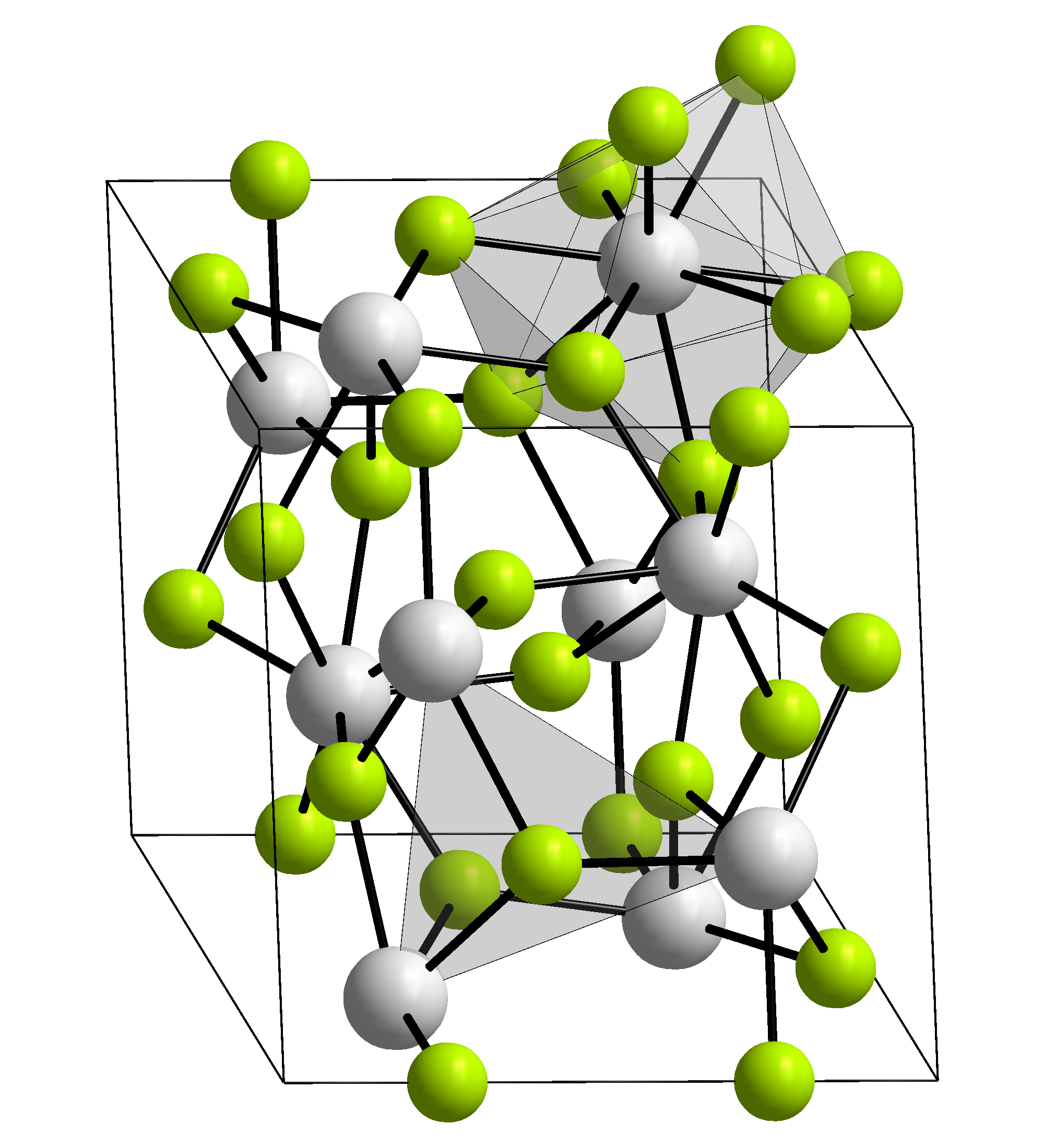
- Crystal structure

Names
- IUPAC name Promethium(III) fluoride
- Other names Promethium trifluoride

Identifiers
CAS Number	13709-45-0
3D model (JSmol)	Interactive image
ChemSpider	103871343
PubChem CID	129681501
CompTox Dashboard (EPA)	DTXSID601337163
- InChI: InChI=1S/3FH.Pm/h3*1H;/q;;;+3/p-3 Key: GBTXURQYFJSURZ-UHFFFAOYSA-K
- SMILES: [F-].[F-].[F-].[Pm+3]

Properties
Chemical formula	PmF_{3}
Molar mass	202 g/mol
Appearance	pink solid
Melting point	1338 °C

Structure
Crystal structure	Rhombohedral, hR24
Space group	P3̅c1, No. 165
- Except where otherwise noted, data are given for materials in their standard state (at 25 °C [77 °F], 100 kPa). Infobox references

Promethium(III) fluoride or promethium trifluoride is a salt of promethium and fluorine with the formula PmF_{3}.

Promethium(III) fluoride is sparingly soluble in water. It reacts with metallic lithium to yield lithium fluoride and metallic promethium:

PmF_{3} + 3Li → Pm + 3LiF
