= Yttrium oxyfluoride =

Identifiers
3D model (JSmol)	Interactive image
PubChem CID	161123050
- InChI: InChI=1S/FH.O.Y/h1H;;/q;-2;+3/p-1 Key: ULEWOPXGNWLKFY-UHFFFAOYSA-M
- SMILES: [Y+3].[O-2].[F-]

Properties
Chemical formula	YOF
Molar mass	123.903 g/mol
Appearance	white powder
Density	5.18 g/cm^{3}

Structure
Crystal structure	tetragonal
Space group	P4/nmm
- Except where otherwise noted, data are given for materials in their standard state (at 25 °C [77 °F], 100 kPa). Infobox references

Yttrium oxyfluoride is an inorganic chemical compound with the formula YOF. Under normal conditions, the compound is a colorless solid.

== Synthesis ==
Yttrium oxyfluoride may be formed in the decomposition of crystalline hydrate of yttrium fluoride upon heating to 900 °C in a vacuum:

$$\mathsf{2YF_3\cdot 1/2H_2O \ \xrightarrow{\tau, 900^oC}\ YOF + YF_3 + 2HF }$$

Yttrium oxyfluoride can also be made by hydrolysis of yttrium fluoride with superheated steam at 800 °C:

$$\mathsf{2YF_3 + H_2O \ \xrightarrow{800^oC}\ YOF + 2HF }$$

== Physical properties ==
Yttrium oxyfluoride forms colorless crystals of tetragonal crystal system; its cell parameters are: a = 0.3910 nm, c = 0.5431 nm. According to hexagonal crystal family, the cell parameters are: a = 0.38727 nm, c = 1.897 nm, Z = 6.

== Applications ==
Stable yttrium oxyfluoride material is used for inner walls of plasma process equipment.
