= Lanthanum oxychloride =

Names
- Other names Lanthanum oxide chloride

Identifiers
3D model (JSmol)	Interactive image
ECHA InfoCard	100.403.288
- InChI: InChI=1S/ClH.La.O/h1H;;/q;+3;-2/p-1 Key: STLFZIUSZCELIB-UHFFFAOYSA-M
- SMILES: [Cl-].[Ln+3].[O-2]

Properties
Chemical formula	LaOCl
Molar mass	190.35 g/mol
Appearance	crystals

Structure
Crystal structure	tetragonal
Space group	P4/nmm

Related compounds
Related compounds	Samarium oxychloride; Praseodymium oxychloride; Holmium oxychloride; Erbium oxychloride
- Except where otherwise noted, data are given for materials in their standard state (at 25 °C [77 °F], 100 kPa). Infobox references

Lanthanum oxychloride or lanthanum oxide chloride is an inorganic compound with the chemical formula LaOCl.

== Synthesis and structure ==
LaOCl can be prepared by treating La_{2}O_{3} with hydrochloric acid. It also us formed by hydrolysis of LaCl_{3} :

LaCl_{3} + H_{2}O → LaOCl + 2HCl

LaOCl adopts the structure seen also for lead chloride fluoride, which exists as the mineral matlockite. In this motif, the La^{3+} center is eight-coordinated, being bound to four chloride and four oxide ligands.

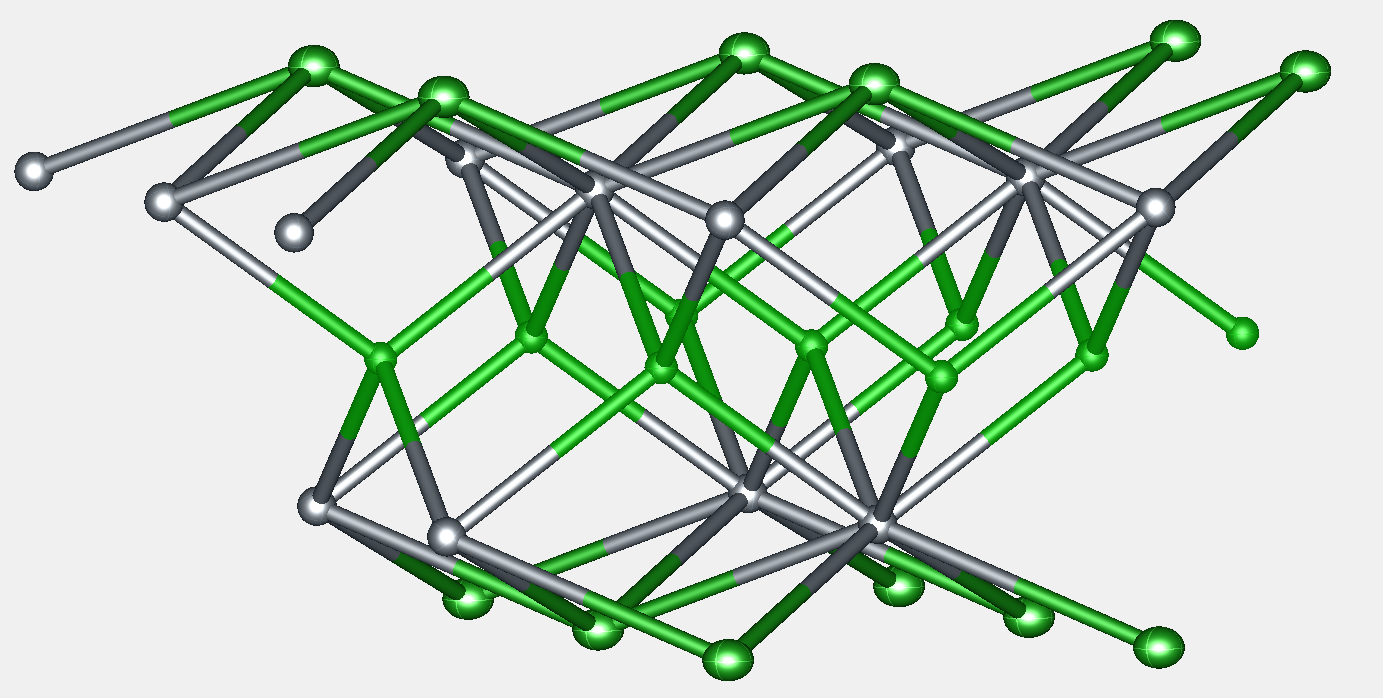
Structure of PbFCl, which is also observed for LaOCl. The larger green spheres are chloride, the tetrahedrally bonded smaller green spheres represent oxide.

== Physical properties ==
LaOCl decomposes to La_{2}O_{3} at about 700 °C in static air.

The compound forms crystals of tetragonal system, space group P4/nmm.
