= Promethium(III) chloride =

- Glowing powder mixture of promethium(III) chloride and zinc sulfide

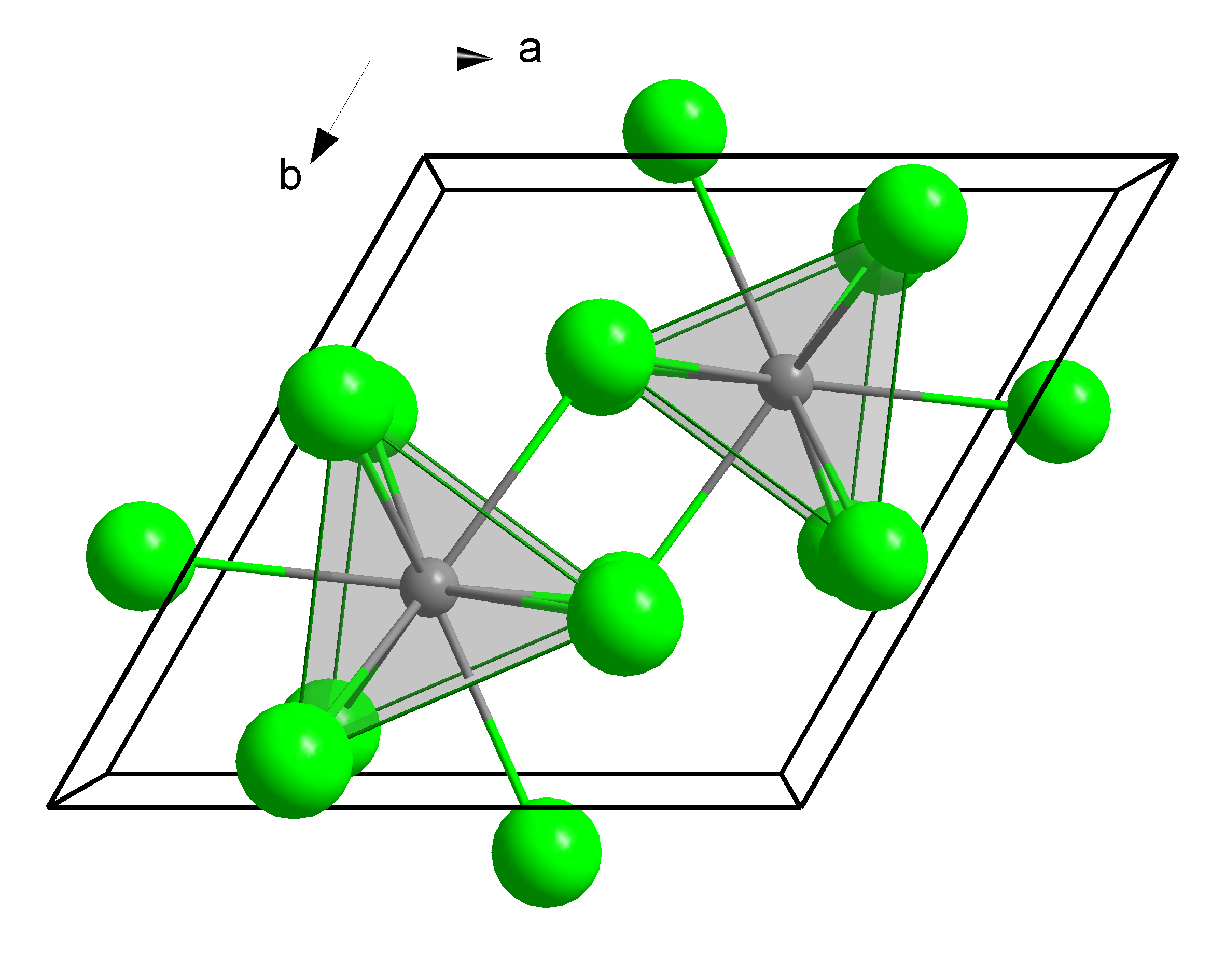
- Crystal structure

Names
- Other names Promethium chloride; Promethium trichloride

Identifiers
CAS Number	13779-10-7
3D model (JSmol)	Interactive image
ChemSpider	14296263
ECHA InfoCard	100.034.004
EC Number	237-420-0
PubChem CID	14475784
- InChI: InChI=1S/3ClH.Pm/h3*1H;/q;;;+3/p-3 Key: KAKNBYVEBALXNX-UHFFFAOYSA-K
- SMILES: [Cl-].[Cl-].[Cl-].[Pm+3]

Properties
Chemical formula	Cl_{3}Pm
Molar mass	251 g·mol^{−1}
Appearance	purple solid yellow solid
Density	4.19 g/cm^{3} (calc., XRD)
Melting point	655 °C (1,211 °F; 928 K)

Structure
Crystal structure	Trigonal, hP8
Space group	P6_{3}/m, No. 176

Related compounds
Other anions	Promethium(III) oxide
Other cations	Neodymium(III) chloride, Samarium(III) chloride
- Except where otherwise noted, data are given for materials in their standard state (at 25 °C [77 °F], 100 kPa). Infobox references

Promethium(III) chloride is a chemical compound of promethium and chlorine with the formula PmCl_{3}. It is an ionic, water soluble, crystalline salt that glows in the dark with a pale blue or green light due to promethium's intense radioactivity.

== Preparation ==
Promethium(III) chloride is obtained from promethium(III) oxide by heating it in a stream of dry HCl at 580 °C.

== Properties ==
Promethium(III) chloride is a purple solid with a melting point of 655 °C. It crystallizes in the hexagonal crystal system (NdCl_{3} type) with the lattice parameters a = 739 pm and c = 421 pm with two formula units per unit cell and thus a calculated density of 4.19 g·cm^{−3}. When PmCl_{3} is heated in the presence of H_{2}O, the pale pink colored promethium(III) oxychloride (PmOCl) is obtained.

== Applications ==
Using the ^{147}Pm isotope, promethium(III) chloride has been used to generate long-lasting glow in signal lights and buttons. This application relied on the unstable nature of promethium, which emitted beta radiation (electrons) with a half-life of several years. The electrons were absorbed by a phosphor, generating visible glow. Unlike many other radioactive nuclides, promethium-147 does not emit alpha particles that would degrade the phosphor.
