= Neodymium oxyfluoride =

Names
- IUPAC name fluoro hypofluorite;neodymium
- Other names Neodymium oxide fluoride

Identifiers
CAS Number	13816-43-8
3D model (JSmol)	Interactive image
- InChI: InChI=1S/FH.Nd.O/h1H;;/q;+3;-2/p-1 Key: FXNFEPRSIMVHIW-UHFFFAOYSA-M
- SMILES: [F-].[O-2].[Nd+3]

Properties
Chemical formula	NdOF
Molar mass	179.239 g/mol
Appearance	Violet powder
Solubility in water	Insoluble

Structure
Crystal structure	cubic, rhombohedral, tetragonal
Space group	P4/nmm

Related compounds
Related compounds	Praseodymium oxyfluoride; Lanthanum oxyfluoride; Samarium oxyfluoride
- Except where otherwise noted, data are given for materials in their standard state (at 25 °C [77 °F], 100 kPa). Infobox references

Neodymium oxyfluoride or neodymium oxide fluoride is an inorganic compound of neodymium, oxygen, and fluorine with the chemical formula NdOF.

== Synthesis ==
NdOF can be synthesized by pressing a mixture of Nd_{2}O_{3} and NdF_{3} at 6 MPa:

Nd_{2}O_{3} + NdF_{3} → 3NdOF

== Physical properties ==
Neodymium oxyfluoride exhibits three distinct crystal structures, all based on the cubic fluorite arrangement. Among these, two correspond to the stoichiometric compound NdOF: cubic and rhombohedral. The third structure, which is tetragonal, emerges under conditions of fluorine excess relative to NdOF and exists over a range of compositions.

== Uses ==
Neodymium oxyfluoride has attracted significant interest in the areas of anionic solid electrolytes, luminescent materials, catalysis, and magnetic materials due to its unique structure, which combines the beneficial properties of rare-earth cations with fluoride (F⁻) and oxide (O²⁻) anions.
