= Promethium(III) oxide =

- Powdered promethium oxide in a metal tray

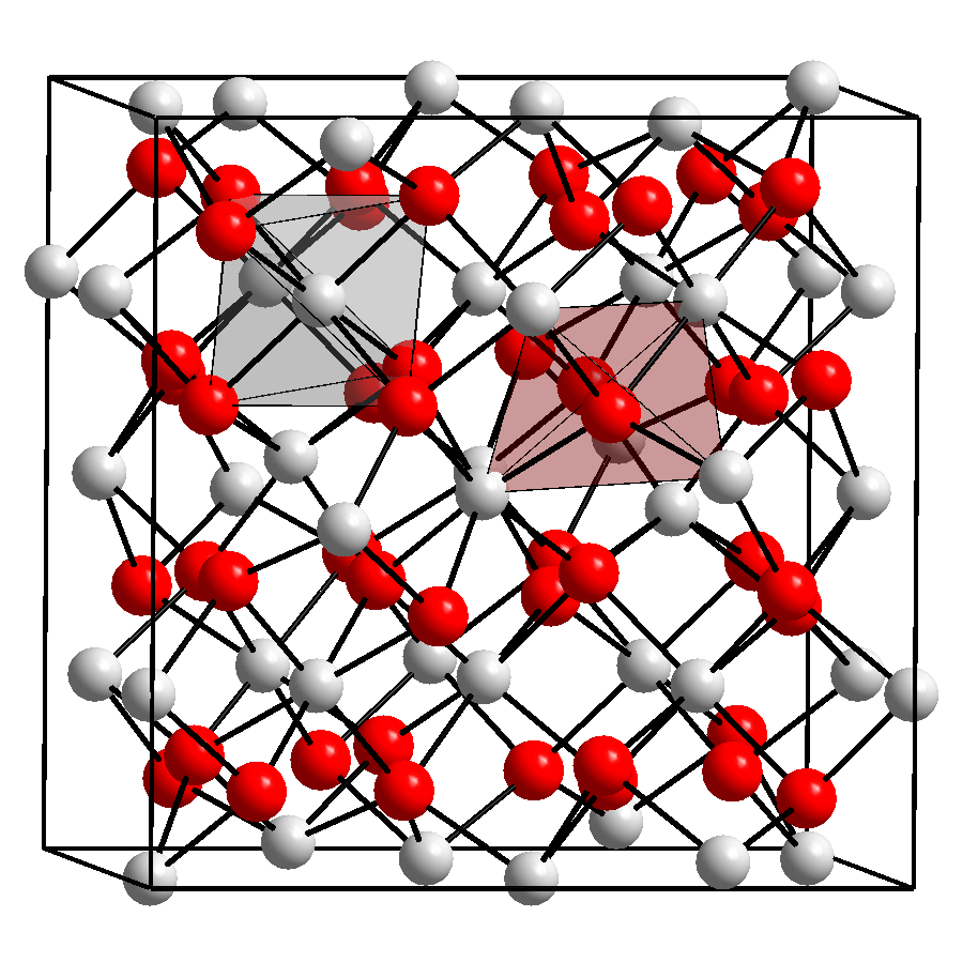
- Cubic form

- Hexagonal form

Names
- IUPAC name Promethium(III) oxide
- Other names Promethium sesquioxide

Identifiers
| CAS Number | 12036-25-8 |
| 3D model (JSmol) | Interactive image |
- InChI: InChI=1S/3O.2Pm/q3*-2;2*+3 Key: UPEMFLOMQVFMCZ-UHFFFAOYSA-N
- SMILES: [O-2].[O-2].[O-2].[Pm+3].[Pm+3]

Properties
| Chemical formula | Pm_{2}O_{3} |
| Molar mass | 337.824 g/mol |
| Melting point | ~2320 °C |

Structure
| Crystal structure | Cubic |

Related compounds
| Other anions | Promethium(III) chloride |
| Other cations | Neodymium(III) oxide, Samarium(III) oxide, Neptunium(III) oxide |
- Except where otherwise noted, data are given for materials in their standard state (at 25 °C [77 °F], 100 kPa). verify (what is ?) Infobox references

Promethium(III) oxide is a compound with the formula Pm_{2}O_{3}. It is the most common form of promethium.

== Crystal structure ==
Promethium oxide exists in three major crystalline forms:

| Form | Pearson symbol | Space group | No. | a; b; c (nm) | β(deg) | Z | Density (g/cm^{3}) |
|---|---|---|---|---|---|---|---|
| Cubic | cI80 | Ia3̅ | 206 | 1.099 | | 16 | 6.85 |
| Monoclinic | mS30 | C2/m | 12 | 1.422; 0.365; 0.891 | 100.1 | 6 | 7.48 |
| Hexagonal | hP5 | P3̅m1 | 164 | 0.3802; 0.3802; 0.5954 | | 1 | 7.62 |

*a, b and c are lattice parameters, Z is the number of formula units per unit cell, density is calculated from X-ray data.

The low-temperature cubic form converts to the monoclinic structure upon heating to 750–800 °C, and this transition can only be reversed by melting the oxide. The transition from the monoclinic to hexagonal form occurs at 1740 °C.
