= Praseodymium oxychloride =

Names
- Other names Praseodymium oxide chloride

Identifiers
3D model (JSmol)	Interactive image
- InChI: InChI=1S/ClH.O.Pr/h1H;;/q;-2;+3/p-1 Key: ANBUEPQBDKGLJP-UHFFFAOYSA-M
- SMILES: [Cl-].[O-2].[Pr+3]

Properties
Chemical formula	PrOCl
Molar mass	192.36 g/mol
Appearance	crystals

Structure
Crystal structure	Tetragonal
Space group	P4/nmm

Related compounds
Related compounds	Lanthanum oxychloride; Neodymium oxychloride; Holmium oxychloride
- Except where otherwise noted, data are given for materials in their standard state (at 25 °C [77 °F], 100 kPa). Infobox references

Praseodymium oxychloride or praseodymium oxide chloride is an inorganic compound of praseodymium, oxygen, and chlorine with the chemical formula PrOCl.

== Synthesis ==
PrOCl can be synthesized by reacting praseodymium oxides (Pr_{2}O_{3} or Pr_{6}O_{11}) with chlorine gas (Cl_{2}).

== Physical properties ==
The compound forms crystals of tetragonal system, space group P4/nmm.
