= Neodymium oxychloride =

Names
- Other names Neodymium oxide chloride

Identifiers
3D model (JSmol)	Interactive image
PubChem CID	172678238
- InChI: InChI=1S/ClH.Nd.O/h1H;;/q;+3;-2/p-1 Key: AANUWLYYJMIHDX-UHFFFAOYSA-M
- SMILES: [Nd+3].[O-2].[Cl-]

Properties
Chemical formula	NdOCl
Molar mass	195.69 g/mol
Appearance	crystals

Structure
Crystal structure	tetragonal
Space group	P4/nmm

Related compounds
Related compounds	Praseodymium oxychloride Holmium oxychloride Erbium oxychloride
- Except where otherwise noted, data are given for materials in their standard state (at 25 °C [77 °F], 100 kPa). Infobox references

Neodymium oxychloride or neodymium oxide chloride is an inorganic compound of neodymium, oxygen, and chlorine with the chemical formula NdOCl.

== Synthesis ==
NdOCl can be synthesized by reacting neodymium oxide (Nd_{2}O_{3}) and calcium dichloride (CaCl_{2}).

Nd_{2}O_{3} + CaCl_{2} → 2NdOCl + CaO

== Physical properties ==
The compound forms crystals of tetragonal system, space group P4/nmm.

It exhibits paramagnetic susceptibility and structural stability.

== Chemical properties ==
NdOCl can be reduced to metallic neodymium through high-temperature electrolysis, specifically within the FFC (Fray-Farthing-Chen) process.

NdOCl + 1.5Ca → Nd + CaO + 0.5CaCl_{2}

== Uses ==
NdOCl has been investigated as a cathode material for the extraction of metallic neodymium.
