= Lanthanum oxyfluoride =

Identifiers
CAS Number	13825-07-5
3D model (JSmol)	Interactive image
PubChem CID	160796944
- InChI: InChI=1S/FH.La.O/h1H;;/q;+3;-2/p-1 Key: SCOIOSQRNIQXDI-UHFFFAOYSA-M
- SMILES: [La+3].[O-2].[F-]

Properties
Chemical formula	LaOF
Molar mass	173.90 g/mol
Appearance	colorless crystals, white powder
Density	6.03 g/cm^{3}

Related compounds
Related compounds	Yttrium oxyfluoride, thorium oxyfluoride
- Except where otherwise noted, data are given for materials in their standard state (at 25 °C [77 °F], 100 kPa). Infobox references

Lanthanum(III) oxyfluoride is an inorganic compound of lanthanum, fluorine, and oxygen with the chemical formula LaOF.

== Synthesis ==
Several methods of synthesizing LaOF are known:

- Hydrolysis of lanthanum fluoride by superheated steam:

2LaF_{3} + H_{2}O → LaOF + 2HF

- Decomposition of lanthanum fluoride semihydrate when heated in vacuum:

2LaF_{3} · 0.5H_{2}O → LaOF + LaF_{3} + 2HF

- Reacting lanthanum oxide with lanthanum fluoride in vacuum:

La_{2}O_{3} + LaF_{3} → 3LaOF

== Uses ==
The compound is used to produce thin films.
