= Lanthanide =

Elements with atomic numbers 57-70

A lanthanide (/ˈlænθənaɪd/) is any of the 15 metallic chemical elements with atomic numbers 57–71, from lanthanum through lutetium. In the periodic table, the first fourteen (up to ytterbium) fill the 4f orbitals. Lutetium (element 71) is also often considered a lanthanide, despite being a d-block element and a transition metal. The IUPAC lists the 15 elements La, Ce, Pr, Nd, Pm, Sm, Eu, Gd, Tb, Dy, Ho, Er, Tm, Yb, Lu, under the collective name lanthanoid (/ˈlænθənɔɪd/), which it recommends as chemically more correct for this series.

The informal chemical symbol Ln is used in general discussions of lanthanide chemistry to refer to any lanthanide. All but one of the lanthanides are f-block elements, corresponding to the filling of the 4f electron shell. Lutetium is a d-block element (thus also a transition metal), and on this basis its inclusion has been questioned; however, like its congeners scandium and yttrium in group 3, it behaves similarly to the other 14. The term rare-earth element or rare-earth metal is often used to include the stable group 3 elements Sc, Y, and Lu in addition to the 4f elements. All lanthanide elements form trivalent cations, Ln^{3+}, whose chemistry is largely determined by the ionic radius, which decreases steadily from lanthanum (La) to lutetium (Lu). Several lanthanides can also form +2 and even +4 oxidation states.

In presentations of the periodic table, the f-block elements are customarily shown as two additional rows below the main body of the table. This convention is entirely a matter of aesthetics and formatting practicality; a rarely used wide-formatted periodic table inserts the 4f and 5f series in their proper places, as parts of the table's sixth and seventh rows (periods), respectively.

== Etymology ==
The term "lanthanide" was introduced by Victor Goldschmidt in 1925. Despite their abundance, the technical term "lanthanides" is interpreted to reflect a sense of elusiveness on the part of these elements, as it comes from the Greek λανθάνειν (lanthanein), "to lie hidden".

The word reflects their property of "hiding" behind each other in minerals. The term derives from lanthanum, first discovered in 1838, at that time a so-called new rare-earth element "lying hidden" or "escaping notice" in a cerium mineral, and it is an irony that lanthanum was later identified as the first in an entire series of chemically similar elements and gave its name to the whole series.

These elements are called lanthanides because the elements in the series are chemically similar to lanthanum. Because "lanthanide" means "like lanthanum", it has been argued that lanthanum cannot logically be a lanthanide, but the International Union of Pure and Applied Chemistry (IUPAC) acknowledges its inclusion based on common usage. The current IUPAC recommendation is that the name lanthanoid be used rather than lanthanide, as the suffix "-ide" is preferred for negative ions, whereas the suffix "-oid" indicates similarity to one of the members of the containing family of elements. However, lanthanide is still commonly used.

== Physical properties of the elements ==
The properties of the lanthanides arise from the order in which the electron shells of these elements are filled—the outermost (6s) has the same configuration for all of them, and a deeper (4f) shell is progressively filled with electrons as the atomic number increases from 57 towards 71. For many years, mixtures of more than one rare earth were considered to be single elements, such as neodymium and praseodymium being thought to be the single element didymium. Very small differences in solubility are used in solvent and ion-exchange purification methods for these elements, which require repeated application to obtain a purified metal. The diverse applications of refined metals and their compounds can be attributed to the subtle and pronounced variations in their electronic, electrical, optical, and magnetic properties.

Some properties of the lanthanides
Chemical element	La	Ce	Pr	Nd	Pm	Sm	Eu	Gd	Tb	Dy	Ho	Er	Tm	Yb	Lu
Atomic number	57	58	59	60	61	62	63	64	65	66	67	68	69	70	71
Image															
Density (g/cm^{3})	6.162	6.770	6.77	7.01	7.26	7.52	5.244	7.90	8.23	8.540	8.79	9.066	9.32	6.90	9.841
Melting point (°C)	920	795	935	1024	1042	1072	826	1312	1356	1407	1461	1529	1545	824	1652
Boiling point (°C)	3464	3443	3520	3074	3000	1794	1529	3273	3230	2567	2720	2868	1950	1196	3402
Atomic electron configuration (gas phase)*	5d^{1}	4f^{1}5d^{1}	4f^{3}	4f^{4}	4f^{5}	4f^{6}	4f^{7}	4f^{7}5d^{1}	4f^{9}	4f^{10}	4f^{11}	4f^{12}	4f^{13}	4f^{14}	4f^{14}5d^{1}
Metal lattice (RT)	dhcp	fcc	dhcp	dhcp	dhcp	**	bcc	hcp	hcp	hcp	hcp	hcp	hcp	fcc	hcp
Metallic radius (pm)	162	181.8	182.4	181.4	183.4	180.4	208.4	180.4	177.3	178.1	176.2	176.1	175.9	193.3	173.8
Resistivity at 25 °C (μΩ·cm)	57–80; 20 °C	73	68	64	—N/a	88	90	134	114	57	87	87	79	29	79
Magnetic susceptibility χ_{mol} /10^{−6}(cm^{3}·mol^{−1})	+95.9	+2500 (β)	+5530 (α)	+5930 (α)	—N/a	+1278 (α)	+30900	+185000 (350 K)	+170000 (α)	+98000	+72900	+48000	+24700	+67 (β)	+183

* Between initial Xe and final 6s^{2} electronic shells

** Sm has a close packed structure like most of the lanthanides but has an unusual 9 layer repeat

Gschneider and Daane (1988) attribute the trend in melting point which increases across the series, (lanthanum (920 °C) – lutetium (1622 °C)) to the extent of hybridization of the 6s, 5d, and 4f orbitals. The hybridization is believed to be at its greatest for cerium, which has the lowest melting point of all, 795 °C. The lanthanide metals are soft; their hardness increases across the series. Europium stands out, as it has the lowest density in the series at 5.24 g/cm^{3} and the largest metallic radius in the series at 208.4 pm. It can be compared to barium, which has a metallic radius of 222 pm. It is believed that the metal contains the larger Eu^{2+} ion and that there are only two electrons in the conduction band. Ytterbium also has a large metallic radius, and a similar explanation is suggested. The resistivities of the lanthanide metals are relatively high, ranging from 29 to 134 μΩ·cm. These values can be compared to a good conductor such as aluminium, which has a resistivity of 2.655 μΩ·cm. With the exceptions of La, Yb, and Lu (which have no unpaired f electrons), the lanthanides are strongly paramagnetic, and this is reflected in their magnetic susceptibilities. Gadolinium becomes ferromagnetic at below 16 °C (Curie point). The other heavier lanthanides – terbium, dysprosium, holmium, erbium, thulium, and ytterbium – become ferromagnetic at much lower temperatures.

Electron configurations and colours of lanthanide ions
Chemical element	La	Ce	Pr	Nd	Pm	Sm	Eu	Gd	Tb	Dy	Ho	Er	Tm	Yb	Lu
Atomic number	57	58	59	60	61	62	63	64	65	66	67	68	69	70	71
Ln^{3+} electron configuration*	4f^{0}	4f^{1}	4f^{2}	4f^{3}	4f^{4}	4f^{5}	4f^{6}	4f^{7}	4f^{8}	4f^{9}	4f^{10}	4f^{11}	4f^{12}	4f^{13}	4f^{14}
Ln^{3+} radius (pm)	103	102	99	98.3	97	95.8	94.7	93.8	92.3	91.2	90.1	89	88	86.8	86.1
Ln^{4+} ion color in aqueous solution	—	Orange-yellow	Yellow	Blue-violet	—	—	—	—	Red-brown	Orange-yellow	—	—	—	—	—
Ln^{3+} ion color in aqueous solution	Colorless	Colorless	Green	Violet	Pink	Pale yellow	Colorless	Colorless	V. pale pink	Pale yellow	Yellow	Rose	Pale green	Colorless	Colorless
Ln^{2+} ion color in aqueous solution	—	—	—	—	—	Blood red	Colorless	—	—	—	—	—	Violet-red	Yellow-green	—

* Not including initial [Xe] core

f → f transitions are symmetry forbidden (or Laporte-forbidden), which is also true of transition metals. However, transition metals are able to use vibronic coupling to break this rule. The valence orbitals in lanthanides are almost entirely non-bonding and as such little effective vibronic coupling takes, hence the spectra from f → f transitions are much weaker and narrower than those from d → d transitions. In general this makes the colors of lanthanide complexes far fainter than those of transition metal complexes.

Approximate colors of lanthanide ions in aqueous solution
Oxidation state	57	58	59	60	61	62	63	64	65	66	67	68	69	70	71
+2						Sm^{2+}	Eu^{2+}						Tm^{2+}	Yb^{2+}	
+3	La^{3+}	Ce^{3+}	Pr^{3+}	Nd^{3+}	Pm^{3+}	Sm^{3+}	Eu^{3+}	Gd^{3+}	Tb^{3+}	Dy^{3+}	Ho^{3+}	Er^{3+}	Tm^{3+}	Yb^{3+}	Lu^{3+}
+4		Ce^{4+}	Pr^{4+}	Nd^{4+}					Tb^{4+}	Dy^{4+}					

=== Effect of 4f orbitals ===
Viewing the lanthanides from left to right in the periodic table, the seven 4f atomic orbitals become progressively more filled (see above and Periodic table § Electron configuration table). The electronic configuration of most neutral gas-phase lanthanide atoms is [Xe]6s^{2}4f^{n}, where n is 56 less than the atomic number Z. Exceptions are La, Ce, Gd, and Lu, which have 4f^{n−1}5d^{1} (though even then 4f^{n} is a low-lying excited state for La, Ce, and Gd; for Lu, the 4f shell is already full, and the fifteenth electron has no choice but to enter 5d). With the exception of lutetium, the 4f orbitals are chemically active in all lanthanides and produce profound differences between lanthanide chemistry and transition metal chemistry. The 4f orbitals penetrate the [Xe] core and are isolated, and thus they do not participate much in bonding. This explains why crystal field effects are small and why they do not form π bonds. As there are seven 4f orbitals, the number of unpaired electrons can be as high as 7, which gives rise to the large magnetic moments observed for lanthanide compounds.

Measuring the magnetic moment can be used to investigate the 4f electron configuration, and this is a useful tool in providing an insight into the chemical bonding. The lanthanide contraction, i.e. the reduction in size of the Ln^{3+} ion from La^{3+} (103 pm) to Lu^{3+} (86.1 pm), is often explained by the poor shielding of the 5s and 5p electrons by the 4f electrons.

== Chemistry and compounds ==
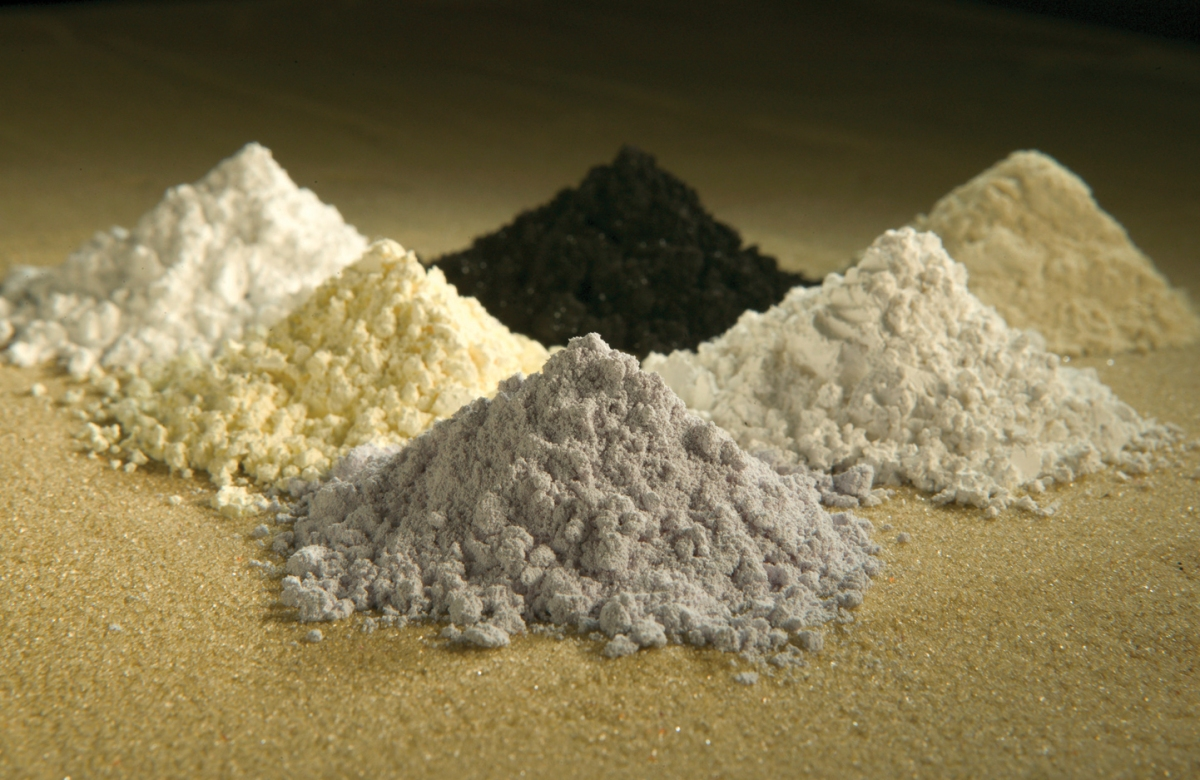
Lanthanide oxides: clockwise from top center: praseodymium, cerium, lanthanum, neodymium, samarium and gadolinium

The chemistry of the lanthanides is dominated by the +3 oxidation state, and in Ln^{III} compounds the 6s electrons and (usually) one 4f electron are lost and the ions have the configuration [Xe]4f^{(n−1)}. All the lanthanide elements exhibit the oxidation state +3. In addition, Ce^{3+} can lose its single f electron to form Ce^{4+} with the stable electronic configuration of xenon. Also, Eu^{3+} can gain an electron to form Eu^{2+} with the f^{7} configuration that has the extra stability of a half-filled shell. Other than Ce(IV) and Eu(II), none of the lanthanides are stable in oxidation states other than +3 in aqueous solution.

In terms of reduction potentials, the Ln^{0/3+} couples are nearly the same for all lanthanides, ranging from −1.99 (for Eu) to −2.35 V (for Pr). Thus these metals are highly reducing, with reducing power similar to alkaline earth metals such as Mg (−2.36 V).

=== Lanthanide oxidation states ===
Ionization energies and reduction potentials of the elements
Chemical element	La	Ce	Pr	Nd	Pm	Sm	Eu	Gd	Tb	Dy	Ho	Er	Tm	Yb	Lu
Atomic number	57	58	59	60	61	62	63	64	65	66	67	68	69	70	71
electron configuration above [Xe] core	4f^{0}5d^{1}6s^{2}	4f^{1}5d^{1}6s^{2}	4f^{3}6s^{2}	4f^{4}6s^{2}	4f^{5}6s^{2}	4f^{6}6s^{2}	4f^{7}6s^{2}	4f^{7}5d^{1}6s^{2}	4f^{9}6s^{2}	4f^{10}6s^{2}	4f^{11}6s^{2}	4f^{12}6s^{2}	4f^{13}6s^{2}	4f^{14}6s^{2}	4f^{14}5d^{1}6s^{2}
E° Ln^{4+}/Ln^{3+}		1.72	3.2						3.1						
E° Ln^{3+}/Ln^{2+}				−2.6		−1.55	−0.35			−2.5			−2.3	−1.05	
E° Ln^{3+}/Ln	−2.38	−2.34	−2.35	−2.32	−2.29	−2.30	−1.99	−2.28	−2.31	−2.29	−2.33	−2.32	−2.32	−2.22	−2.30
1st Ionization energy (kJ·mol^{−1})	538	541	522	530	536	542	547	595	569	567	574	581	589	603	513
2nd Ionization energy (kJ·mol^{−1})	1067	1047	1018	1034	1052	1068	1085	1172	1112	1126	1139	1151	1163	1175	1341
1st + 2nd Ionization energy (kJ·mol^{−1})	1605	1588	1540	1564	1588	1610	1632	1767	1681	1693	1713	1732	1752	1778	1854
3rd Ionization energy (kJ·mol^{−1})	1850	1940	2090	2128	2140	2285	2425	1999	2122	2230	2221	2207	2305	2408	2054
1st + 2nd + 3rd Ionization energy (kJ·mol^{−1})	3455	3528	3630	3692	3728	3895	4057	3766	3803	3923	3934	3939	4057	4186	3908
4th Ionization energy (kJ·mol^{−1})	4819	3547	3761	3900	3970	3990	4120	4250	3839	3990	4100	4120	4120	4203	4370

The ionization energies for the lanthanides can be compared with aluminium. In aluminium the sum of the first three ionization energies is 5139 kJ·mol^{−1}, whereas the lanthanides fall in the range 3455 – 4186 kJ·mol^{−1}. This correlates with the highly reactive nature of the lanthanides.

The sum of the first two ionization energies for europium, 1632 kJ·mol^{−1} can be compared with that of barium 1468.1 kJ·mol^{−1} and europium's third ionization energy is the highest of the lanthanides. The sum of the first two ionization energies for ytterbium are the second lowest in the series and its third ionization energy is the second highest. The high third ionization energy for Eu and Yb correlate with the half filling 4f^{7} and complete filling 4f^{14} of the 4f subshell, and the stability afforded by such configurations due to exchange energy. Europium and ytterbium form salt like compounds with Eu^{2+} and Yb^{2+}, for example the salt like dihydrides. Both europium and ytterbium dissolve in liquid ammonia forming solutions of Ln^{2+}(NH_{3})_{x} again demonstrating their similarities to the alkaline earth metals.

The relative ease with which the 4th electron can be removed in cerium and (to a lesser extent praseodymium) indicates why Ce(IV) and Pr(IV) compounds can be formed, for example CeO_{2} is formed rather than Ce_{2}O_{3} when cerium reacts with oxygen. Also Tb has a well-known IV state, as removing the 4th electron in this case produces a half-full 4f^{7} configuration.

The additional stable valences for Ce and Eu mean that their abundances in rocks sometimes varies significantly relative to the other rare earth elements: see cerium anomaly and europium anomaly.

=== Separation of lanthanides ===
The separation of lanthanide elements is one of very laborious processes in inorganic chemistry. The dominant technology involves solvent extraction. Typically an aqueous solution of nitrates is extracted into kerosene containing tri-n-butylphosphate. Complete separation is achieved continuously by countercurrent exchange methods.

==== Older methods ====
At one time, fractional crystallization was used. This approach was applied to the separation of the lanthanides (and related elements) into three groups: yttrium, praseodymium-neodymium-samarium, cerium, and the others.

The elements were also once separated by ion-exchange chromatography, often in combination with the use of aminocarboxylate ligands. Relevant is the stability constant for formation of EDTA complexes increases for log K ≈ 15.5 for [La(EDTA)]^{−} to log K ≈ 19.8 for [Lu(EDTA)]^{−}.

=== Coordination chemistry ===
When in the form of coordination complexes, lanthanides exist overwhelmingly in their +3 oxidation state, although particularly stable 4f configurations can also give +4 (Ce, Pr, Tb) or +2 (Sm, Eu, Yb) ions. All of these forms are strongly electropositive and thus lanthanide ions are hard Lewis acids. The oxidation states are also very stable; with the exceptions of SmI_{2} and cerium(IV) salts, lanthanides are not used for redox chemistry. 4f electrons have a high probability of being found close to the nucleus and are thus strongly affected as the nuclear charge increases across the series; this results in a corresponding decrease in ionic radii referred to as the lanthanide contraction.

The low probability of the 4f electrons existing at the outer region of the atom or ion permits little effective overlap between the orbitals of a lanthanide ion and any binding ligand. Thus lanthanide complexes typically have little or no covalent character and are not influenced by orbital geometries. The lack of orbital interaction also means that varying the metal typically has little effect on the complex (other than size), especially when compared to transition metals. Complexes are held together by weaker electrostatic forces which are omni-directional and thus the ligands alone dictate the symmetry and coordination of complexes. Steric factors therefore dominate, with coordinative saturation of the metal being balanced against inter-ligand repulsion. This results in a diverse range of coordination geometries, many of which are irregular, and also manifests itself in the highly fluxional nature of the complexes. As there is no energetic reason to be locked into a single geometry, rapid intramolecular and intermolecular ligand exchange will take place. This typically results in complexes that rapidly fluctuate between all possible configurations.

Hard Lewis acids polarise bonds upon coordination and thus alter the electrophilicity of compounds, with a classic example being the Luche reduction. The large size of the ions coupled with their labile ionic bonding allows even bulky coordinating species to bind and dissociate rapidly, resulting in very high turnover rates. The lack of orbital interactions combined with the lanthanide contraction means that the lanthanides change in size across the series but that their chemistry remains much the same. This allows for easy tuning of the steric environments and examples exist where this has been used to improve the catalytic activity of the complex and change the nuclearity of metal clusters.

Despite this, the use of lanthanide coordination complexes as homogeneous catalysts is largely restricted to the laboratory

=== Catalysis ===
Approximately 10% of the economic value of the lanthanides is attributed to their use in catalysis. Especially valued are their uses in petrochemical processing such as alkylation, coke removal. Ceria is of particular utility.

==== Ln(III) compounds ====
The trivalent lanthanides mostly form ionic salts. The trivalent ions are hard acceptors and form more stable complexes with oxygen-donor ligands than with nitrogen-donor ligands. The larger ions are 9-coordinate in aqueous solution, [Ln(H_{2}O)_{9}]^{3+} but the smaller ions are 8-coordinate, [Ln(H_{2}O)_{8}]^{3+}. There is some evidence that the later lanthanides have more water molecules in the second coordination sphere. Complexation with monodentate ligands is generally weak because it is difficult to displace water molecules from the first coordination sphere. Stronger complexes are formed with chelating ligands because of the chelate effect, such as the tetra-anion derived from 1,4,7,10-tetraazacyclododecane-1,4,7,10-tetraacetic acid (DOTA).

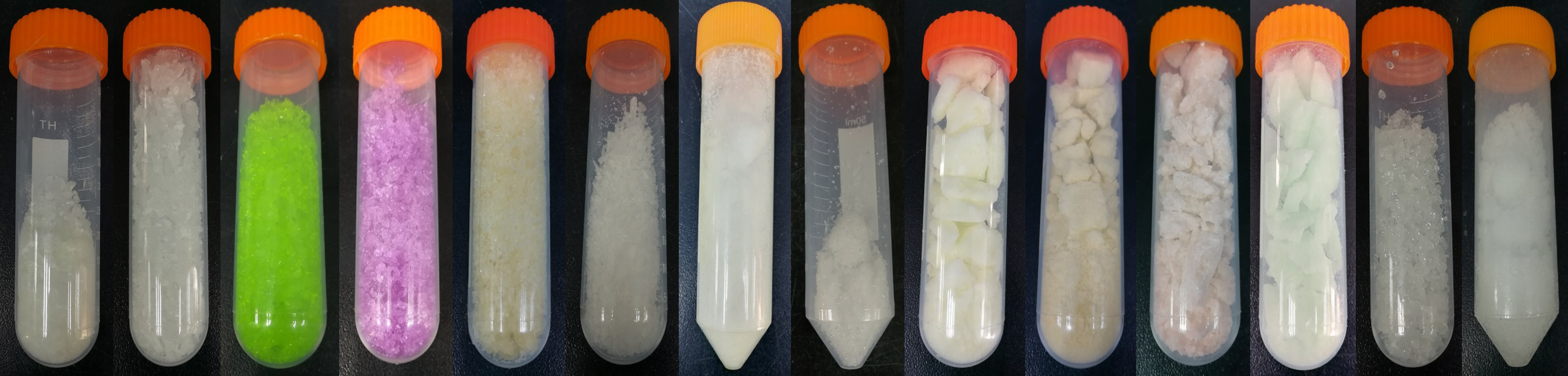
Samples of lanthanide nitrates in their hexahydrate form. From left to right: La, Ce, Pr, Nd, Sm, Eu, Gd, Tb, Dy, Ho, Er, Tm, Yb, Lu.

==== Ln(II) and Ln(IV) compounds ====
The most common divalent derivatives of the lanthanides are for Eu(II), which achieves a favorable f^{7} configuration. Divalent halide derivatives are known for all of the lanthanides. They are either conventional salts or are Ln(III) "electride"-like salts. The simple salts include YbI_{2}, EuI_{2}, and SmI_{2}. The electride-like salts, described as Ln^{3+}, 2I^{−}, e^{−}, include LaI_{2}, CeI_{2} and GdI_{2}. Many of the iodides form soluble complexes with ethers, e.g. TmI_{2}(dimethoxyethane)_{3}. Samarium(II) iodide is a useful reducing agent. Ln(II) complexes can be synthesized by transmetalation reactions. The normal range of oxidation states can be expanded via the use of sterically bulky cyclopentadienyl ligands, in this way many lanthanides can be isolated as Ln(II) compounds.

Ce(IV) in ceric ammonium nitrate is a useful oxidizing agent. The Ce(IV) is the exception owing to the tendency to form an unfilled f shell. Otherwise tetravalent lanthanides are rare. However, recently Tb(IV) and Pr(IV) complexes have been shown to exist.

==== Hydrides ====
Chemical element	La	Ce	Pr	Nd	Pm	Sm	Eu	Gd	Tb	Dy	Ho	Er	Tm	Yb	Lu
Atomic number	57	58	59	60	61	62	63	64	65	66	67	68	69	70	71
Metal lattice (RT)	dhcp	fcc	dhcp	dhcp	dhcp	r	bcc	hcp	hcp	hcp	hcp	hcp	hcp	hcp	hcp
Dihydride	LaH_{2+x}	CeH_{2+x}	PrH_{2+x}	NdH_{2+x}		SmH_{2+x}	EuH_{2} o "salt like"	GdH_{2+x}	TbH_{2+x}	DyH_{2+x}	HoH_{2+x}	ErH_{2+x}	TmH_{2+x}	YbH_{2+x} o, fcc "salt like"	LuH_{2+x}
Structure	CaF_{2}	CaF_{2}	CaF_{2}	CaF_{2}	CaF_{2}	CaF_{2}	*PbCl_{2}	CaF_{2}	CaF_{2}	CaF_{2}	CaF_{2}	CaF_{2}	CaF_{2}		CaF_{2}
metal sub lattice	fcc	fcc	fcc	fcc	fcc	fcc	o	fcc	fcc	fcc	fcc	fcc	fcc	o fcc	fcc
Trihydride	LaH_{3−x}	CeH_{3−x}	PrH_{3−x}	NdH_{3−x}		SmH_{3−x}	EuH_{3−x}	GdH_{3−x}	TbH_{3−x}	DyH_{3−x}	HoH_{3−x}	ErH_{3−x}	TmH_{3−x}		LuH_{3−x}
metal sub lattice	fcc	fcc	fcc	hcp	hcp	hcp	fcc	hcp	hcp	hcp	hcp	hcp	hcp	hcp	hcp
Trihydride properties transparent insulators (color where recorded)	red	bronze to grey	PrH_{3−x} fcc	NdH_{3−x} hcp		golden greenish	EuH_{3−x} fcc	GdH_{3−x} hcp	TbH_{3−x} hcp	DyH_{3−x} hcp	HoH_{3−x} hcp	ErH_{3−x} hcp	TmH_{3−x} hcp		LuH_{3−x} hcp

Lanthanide metals react exothermically with hydrogen to form LnH_{2}, dihydrides. With the exception of Eu and Yb, which resemble the Ba and Ca hydrides (non-conducting, transparent salt-like compounds), they form black, pyrophoric, conducting compounds where the metal sub-lattice is face centred cubic and the H atoms occupy tetrahedral sites. Further hydrogenation produces a trihydride which is non-stoichiometric, non-conducting, more salt like. The formation of trihydride is associated with and increase in 8–10% volume and this is linked to greater localization of charge on the hydrogen atoms which become more anionic (H^{−} hydride anion) in character.

==== Halides ====
Lanthanide halides
Chemical element	La	Ce	Pr	Nd	Pm	Sm	Eu	Gd	Tb	Dy	Ho	Er	Tm	Yb	Lu
Atomic number	57	58	59	60	61	62	63	64	65	66	67	68	69	70	71
Tetrafluoride		CeF_{4}	PrF_{4}	NdF_{4}					TbF_{4}	DyF_{4}					
Color m.p. °C		white dec	white dec						white dec						
Structure C.N.		UF_{4} 8	UF_{4} 8						UF_{4} 8						
Trifluoride	LaF_{3}	CeF_{3}	PrF_{3}	NdF_{3}	PmF_{3}	SmF_{3}	EuF_{3}	GdF_{3}	TbF_{3}	DyF_{3}	HoF_{3}	ErF_{3}	TmF_{3}	YbF_{3}	LuF_{3}
Color m.p. °C	white 1493	white 1430	green 1395	violet 1374	pink 1399	white 1306	white 1276	white 1231	white 1172	white 1154	yellow 1143	pink 1140	white 1158	white 1157	white 1182
Structure C.N.	LaF_{3} 9	LaF_{3} 9	LaF_{3} 9	LaF_{3} 9	LaF_{3} 9	YF_{3} 8	YF_{3} 8	YF_{3} 8	YF_{3} 8	YF_{3} 8	YF_{3} 8	YF_{3} 8	YF_{3} 8	YF_{3} 8	YF_{3} 8
Trichloride	LaCl_{3}	CeCl_{3}	PrCl_{3}	NdCl_{3}	PmCl_{3}	SmCl_{3}	EuCl_{3}	GdCl_{3}	TbCl_{3}	DyCl_{3}	HoCl_{3}	ErCl_{3}	TmCl_{3}	YbCl_{3}	LuCl_{3}
Color m.p. °C	white 858	white 817	green 786	mauve 758	purple 786	yellow 682	yellow dec	white 602	white 582	white 647	yellow 720	violet 776	yellow 824	white 865	white 925
Structure C.N.	UCl_{3} 9	UCl_{3} 9	UCl_{3} 9	UCl_{3} 9	UCl_{3} 9	UCl_{3} 9	UCl_{3} 9	UCl_{3} 9	PuBr_{3} 8	PuBr_{3} 8	YCl_{3} 6	YCl_{3} 6	YCl_{3} 6	YCl_{3} 6	YCl_{3} 6
Tribromide	LaBr_{3}	CeBr_{3}	PrBr_{3}	NdBr_{3}	PmBr_{3}	SmBr_{3}	EuBr_{3}	GdBr_{3}	TbBr_{3}	DyBr_{3}	HoBr_{3}	ErBr_{3}	TmBr_{3}	YbBr_{3}	LuBr_{3}
Color m.p. °C	white 783	white 733	green 691	violet 682	red 693	yellow 640	grey dec	white 770	white 828	white 879	yellow 919	violet 923	white 954	white dec	white 1025
Structure C.N.	UCl_{3} 9	UCl_{3} 9	UCl_{3} 9	PuBr_{3} 8	PuBr_{3} 8	PuBr_{3} 8	PuBr_{3} 8	6	6	6	6	6	6	6	6
Triiodide	LaI_{3}	CeI_{3}	PrI_{3}	NdI_{3}	PmI_{3}	SmI_{3}	EuI_{3}	GdI_{3}	TbI_{3}	DyI_{3}	HoI_{3}	ErI_{3}	TmI_{3}	YbI_{3}	LuI_{3}
Color m.p. °C	yellow-green 772	yellow 766	green 738	green 784	red 737	orange 850	colorless dec.	yellow 925	brown 957	green 978	yellow 994	violet 1015	yellow 1021	white dec	brown 1050
Structure C.N.	PuBr_{3} 8	PuBr_{3} 8	PuBr_{3} 8	PuBr_{3} 8	PuBr_{3} 8	BiI_{3} 6	BiI_{3} 6	BiI_{3} 6	BiI_{3} 6	BiI_{3} 6	BiI_{3} 6	BiI_{3} 6	BiI_{3} 6	BiI_{3} 6	BiI_{3} 6
Difluoride						SmF_{2}	EuF_{2}						TmF_{2}	YbF_{2}	
Color m.p. °C						purple 1417	yellow 1416							grey	
Structure C.N.						CaF_{2} 8	CaF_{2} 8							CaF_{2} 8	
Dichloride				NdCl_{2}		SmCl_{2}	EuCl_{2}			DyCl_{2}			TmCl_{2}	YbCl_{2}	
Color m.p. °C				green 841		brown 859	white 731			black dec.			green 718	green 720	
Structure C.N.				PbCl_{2} 9		PbCl_{2} 9	PbCl_{2} 9			SrBr_{2}			SrI_{2} 7	SrI_{2} 7	
Dibromide				NdBr_{2}		SmBr_{2}	EuBr_{2}			DyBr_{2}			TmBr_{2}	YbBr_{2}	
Color m.p. °C				green 725		brown 669	white 731			black			green	yellow 673	
Structure C.N.				PbCl_{2} 9		SrBr_{2} 8	SrBr_{2} 8			SrI_{2} 7			SrI_{2} 7	SrI_{2} 7	
Diiodide	LaI_{2} metallic	CeI_{2} metallic	PrI_{2} metallic	NdI_{2} high pressure metallic		SmI_{2}	EuI_{2}	GdI_{2} metallic		DyI_{2}			TmI_{2}	YbI_{2}	
Color m.p. °C		bronze 808	bronze 758	violet 562		green 520	green 580	bronze 831		purple 721			black 756	yellow 780	
Structure C.N.	CuTi_{2} 8	CuTi_{2} 8	CuTi_{2} 8	SrBr_{2} 8 CuTi_{2} 8		EuI_{2} 7	EuI_{2} 7	2H-MoS_{2} 6					CdI_{2} 6	CdI_{2} 6	
Ln_{7}I_{12}	La_{7}I_{12}		Pr_{7}I_{12}						Tb_{7}I_{12}						
Sesquichloride	La_{2}Cl_{3}							Gd_{2}Cl_{3}	Tb_{2}Cl_{3}			Er_{2}Cl_{3}	Tm_{2}Cl_{3}		Lu_{2}Cl_{3}
Structure								Gd_{2}Cl_{3}	Gd_{2}Cl_{3}						
Sesquibromide								Gd_{2}Br_{3}	Tb_{2}Br_{3}						
Structure								Gd_{2}Cl_{3}	Gd_{2}Cl_{3}						
Monoiodide	LaI												TmI		
Structure	NiAs type														

The only tetrahalides known are the tetrafluorides of cerium, praseodymium, terbium, neodymium and dysprosium, the last two known only under matrix isolation conditions. All of the lanthanides form trihalides with fluorine, chlorine, bromine and iodine. They are all high melting and predominantly ionic in nature. The fluorides are only slightly soluble in water and are not sensitive to air, and this contrasts with the other halides which are air sensitive, readily soluble in water and react at high temperature to form oxohalides.

The trihalides were important as pure metal can be prepared from them. In the gas phase the trihalides are planar or approximately planar, the lighter lanthanides have a lower % of dimers, the heavier lanthanides a higher proportion. The dimers have a similar structure to Al_{2}Cl_{6}.

Some of the dihalides are conducting while the rest are insulators. The conducting forms can be considered as Ln^{III} electride compounds where the electron is delocalised into a conduction band, Ln^{3+} (X^{−})_{2}(e^{−}). All of the diiodides have relatively short metal-metal separations. The CuTi_{2} structure of the lanthanum, cerium and praseodymium diiodides along with HP-NdI_{2} contain 4^{4} nets of metal and iodine atoms with short metal-metal bonds (393-386 La-Pr). these compounds should be considered to be two-dimensional metals (two-dimensional in the same way that graphite is). The salt-like dihalides include those of Eu, Dy, Tm, and Yb. The formation of a relatively stable +2 oxidation state for Eu and Yb is usually explained by the stability (exchange energy) of half filled (f^{7}) and fully filled f^{14}. GdI_{2} possesses the layered MoS_{2} structure, is ferromagnetic and exhibits colossal magnetoresistance.

The sesquihalides Ln_{2}X_{3} and the Ln_{7}I_{12} compounds listed in the table contain metal clusters, discrete Ln_{6}I_{12} clusters in Ln_{7}I_{12} and condensed clusters forming chains in the sesquihalides. Scandium forms a similar cluster compound with chlorine, Sc_{7}Cl_{12} Unlike many transition metal clusters these lanthanide clusters do not have strong metal-metal interactions and this is due to the low number of valence electrons involved, but instead are stabilised by the surrounding halogen atoms.

LaI and TmI are the only known monohalides. LaI, prepared from the reaction of LaI_{3} and La metal, it has a NiAs type structure and can be formulated La^{3+} (I^{−})(e^{−})_{2}. TmI is a true Tm(I) compound, however it is not isolated in a pure state.

==== Oxides and hydroxides ====
All of the lanthanides form sesquioxides, Ln_{2}O_{3}. The lighter/larger lanthanides adopt a hexagonal 7-coordinate structure while the heavier/smaller ones adopt a cubic 6-coordinate "C-M_{2}O_{3}" structure. All of the sesquioxides are basic, and absorb water and carbon dioxide from air to form carbonates, hydroxides and hydroxycarbonates. They dissolve in acids to form salts.

Cerium forms a stoichiometric dioxide, CeO_{2}, where cerium has an oxidation state of +4. CeO_{2} is basic and dissolves with difficulty in acid to form Ce^{4+} solutions, from which Ce^{IV} salts can be isolated, for example the hydrated nitrate Ce(NO_{3})_{4}.5H_{2}O. CeO_{2} is used as an oxidation catalyst in catalytic converters. Praseodymium and terbium form non-stoichiometric oxides containing Ln^{IV}, although more extreme reaction conditions can produce stoichiometric (or near stoichiometric) PrO_{2} and TbO_{2}.

Europium and ytterbium form salt-like monoxides, EuO and YbO, which have a rock salt structure. EuO is ferromagnetic at low temperatures, and is a semiconductor with possible applications in spintronics. A mixed Eu^{II}/Eu^{III} oxide Eu_{3}O_{4} can be produced by reducing Eu_{2}O_{3} in a stream of hydrogen. Neodymium and samarium also form monoxides, but these are shiny conducting solids, although the existence of samarium monoxide is considered dubious.

All of the lanthanides form hydroxides, Ln(OH)_{3}. With the exception of lutetium hydroxide, which has a cubic structure, they have the hexagonal UCl_{3} structure. The hydroxides can be precipitated from solutions of Ln^{III}. They can also be formed by the reaction of the sesquioxide, Ln_{2}O_{3}, with water, but although this reaction is thermodynamically favorable it is kinetically slow for the heavier members of the series. Fajans' rules indicate that the smaller Ln^{3+} ions will be more polarizing and their salts correspondingly less ionic. The hydroxides of the heavier lanthanides become less basic, for example Yb(OH)_{3} and Lu(OH)_{3} are still basic hydroxides but will dissolve in hot concentrated NaOH.

==== Chalcogenides (S, Se, Te) ====
All of the lanthanides form Ln_{2}Q_{3} (Q= S, Se, Te). The sesquisulfides can be produced by reaction of the elements or (with the exception of Eu_{2}S_{3}) sulfidizing the oxide (Ln_{2}O_{3}) with H_{2}S. The sesquisulfides, Ln_{2}S_{3} generally lose sulfur when heated and can form a range of compositions between Ln_{2}S_{3} and Ln_{3}S_{4}. The sesquisulfides are insulators but some of the Ln_{3}S_{4} are metallic conductors (e.g. Ce_{3}S_{4}) formulated (Ln^{3+})_{3} (S^{2−})_{4} (e^{−}), while others (e.g. Eu_{3}S_{4} and Sm_{3}S_{4}) are semiconductors. Structurally the sesquisulfides adopt structures that vary according to the size of the Ln metal. The lighter and larger lanthanides favoring 7-coordinate metal atoms, the heaviest and smallest lanthanides (Yb and Lu) favoring 6 coordination and the rest structures with a mixture of 6 and 7 coordination.

Polymorphism is common amongst the sesquisulfides. The colors of the sesquisulfides vary metal to metal and depend on the polymorphic form. The colors of the γ-sesquisulfides are La_{2}S_{3}, white/yellow; Ce_{2}S_{3}, dark red; Pr_{2}S_{3}, green; Nd_{2}S_{3}, light green; Gd_{2}S_{3}, sand; Tb_{2}S_{3}, light yellow and Dy_{2}S_{3}, orange. The shade of γ-Ce_{2}S_{3} can be varied by doping with Na or Ca with hues ranging from dark red to yellow, and Ce_{2}S_{3} based pigments are used commercially and are seen as low toxicity substitutes for cadmium based pigments.

All of the lanthanides form monochalcogenides, LnQ, (Q= S, Se, Te). The majority of the monochalcogenides are conducting, indicating a formulation Ln^{III}Q^{2−}(e-) where the electron is in conduction bands. The exceptions are SmQ, EuQ and YbQ which are semiconductors or insulators but exhibit a pressure induced transition to a conducting state. Compounds LnQ_{2} are known but these do not contain Ln^{IV} but are Ln^{III} compounds containing polychalcogenide anions.

Oxysulfides Ln_{2}O_{2}S are well known, they all have the same structure with 7-coordinate Ln atoms, and 3 sulfur and 4 oxygen atoms as near neighbours. Doping these with other lanthanide elements produces phosphors. As an example, gadolinium oxysulfide, Gd_{2}O_{2}S doped with Tb^{3+} produces visible photons when irradiated with high energy X-rays and is used as a scintillator in flat panel detectors. When mischmetal, an alloy of lanthanide metals, is added to molten steel to remove oxygen and sulfur, stable oxysulfides are produced that form an immiscible solid.

==== Pnictides (group 15) ====
All of the lanthanides form a mononitride, LnN, with the rock salt structure. The mononitrides have attracted interest because of their unusual physical properties. SmN and EuN are reported as being "half metals". NdN, GdN, TbN and DyN are ferromagnetic, SmN is antiferromagnetic. Applications in the field of spintronics are being investigated. CeN is unusual as it is a metallic conductor, contrasting with the other nitrides also with the other cerium pnictides. A simple description is Ce^{4+}N^{3−} (e–) but the interatomic distances are a better match for the trivalent state rather than for the tetravalent state. A number of different explanations have been offered. The nitrides can be prepared by the reaction of lanthanum metals with nitrogen. Some nitride is produced along with the oxide, when lanthanum metals are ignited in air. Alternative methods of synthesis are a high temperature reaction of lanthanide metals with ammonia or the decomposition of lanthanide amides, Ln(NH_{2})_{3}. Achieving pure stoichiometric compounds, and crystals with low defect density has proved difficult. The lanthanide nitrides are sensitive to air and hydrolyse producing ammonia.

The other pnictides phosphorus, arsenic, antimony and bismuth also react with the lanthanide metals to form monopnictides, LnQ, where Q = P, As, Sb or Bi. Additionally a range of other compounds can be produced with varying stoichiometries, such as LnP_{2}, LnP_{5}, LnP_{7}, Ln_{3}As, Ln_{5}As_{3} and LnAs_{2}.

==== Carbides ====
Carbides of varying stoichiometries are known for the lanthanides. Non-stoichiometry is common. All of the lanthanides form LnC_{2} and Ln_{2}C_{3} which both contain C_{2} units.

The dicarbides with exception of EuC_{2}, are metallic conductors with the calcium carbide structure and can be formulated as Ln^{3+}C_{2}^{2−}(e–). The C-C bond length is longer than that in CaC_{2}, which contains the C_{2}^{2−} anion, indicating that the antibonding orbitals of the C_{2}^{2−} anion are involved in the conduction band. These dicarbides hydrolyse to form hydrogen and a mixture of hydrocarbons. EuC_{2} and to a lesser extent YbC_{2} hydrolyse differently producing a higher percentage of acetylene (ethyne).

The sesquicarbides, Ln_{2}C_{3} can be formulated as Ln_{4}(C_{2})_{3}. These compounds adopt the Pu_{2}C_{3} structure which has been described as having C_{2}^{2−} anions in bisphenoid holes formed by eight near Ln neighbours. The C-C bond is less elongated than in the dicarbides, with the exception of Ce_{2}C_{3}, indicating that the delocalized metal electrons do not fill C-C antibonding orbitals.

Other carbon rich stoichiometries are known for some lanthanides. Ln_{3}C_{4} (Ho-Lu) containing C, C_{2} and C_{3} units; Ln_{4}C_{7} (Ho-Lu) contain C atoms and C_{3} units and Ln_{4}C_{5} (Gd-Ho) containing C and C_{2} units.

Metal rich carbides contain interstitial C atoms and no C_{2} or C_{3} units. These are Ln_{4}C_{3} (Tb and Lu); Ln_{2}C (Dy, Ho, Tm) and Ln_{3}C (Sm-Lu). These hydrolyze to methane.

==== Borides ====
All of the lanthanides form a number of borides. The "higher" borides (LnB_{x} where x > 12) are insulators/semiconductors whereas the lower borides are typically conducting. The lower borides have stoichiometries of LnB_{2}, LnB_{4}, LnB_{6} and LnB_{12}. Applications in the field of spintronics are being investigated. The range of borides formed by the lanthanides can be compared to those formed by the transition metals. The boron rich borides are typical of the lanthanides (and groups 1–3) whereas for the transition metals tend to form metal rich, "lower" borides. The lanthanide borides are typically grouped together with the group 3 metals with which they share many similarities of reactivity, stoichiometry and structure. Collectively these are then termed the rare earth borides.

Many methods of producing lanthanide borides have been used, amongst them are direct reaction of the elements; the reduction of Ln_{2}O_{3} with boron; reduction of boron oxide, B_{2}O_{3}, and Ln_{2}O_{3} together with carbon; reduction of metal oxide with boron carbide, B_{4}C. Producing high purity samples has proved to be difficult. Single crystals of the higher borides have been grown in a low melting metal (e.g. Sn, Cu, Al).

Diborides, LnB_{2}, have been reported for Sm, Gd, Tb, Dy, Ho, Er, Tm, Yb and Lu. All have the same, AlB_{2}, structure containing a graphitic layer of boron atoms. Low temperature ferromagnetic transitions for Tb, Dy, Ho and Er. TmB_{2} is ferromagnetic at 7.2 K.

Tetraborides, LnB_{4} have been reported for all of the lanthanides except EuB_{4}, all have the same UB_{4} structure. The structure has a boron sub-lattice consists of chains of octahedral B_{6} clusters linked by boron atoms. The unit cell decreases in size successively from LaB_{4} to LuB_{4}. The tetraborides of the lighter lanthanides melt with decomposition to LnB_{6}. Attempts to make EuB_{4} have failed. The LnB_{4} are good conductors and typically antiferromagnetic.

Hexaborides, LnB_{6} have been reported for all of the lanthanides. They all have the CaB_{6} structure, containing B_{6} clusters. They are non-stoichiometric due to cation defects. The hexaborides of the lighter lanthanides (La – Sm) melt without decomposition, EuB_{6} decomposes to boron and metal and the heavier lanthanides decompose to LnB_{4} with exception of YbB_{6} which decomposes forming YbB_{12}. The stability has in part been correlated to differences in volatility between the lanthanide metals. In EuB_{6} and YbB_{6} the metals have an oxidation state of +2 whereas in the rest of the lanthanide hexaborides it is +3. This rationalises the differences in conductivity, the extra electrons in the Ln^{III} hexaborides entering conduction bands. EuB_{6} is a semiconductor and the rest are good conductors. LaB_{6} and CeB_{6} are thermionic emitters, used, for example, in scanning electron microscopes.

Dodecaborides, LnB_{12}, are formed by the heavier smaller lanthanides, but not by the lighter larger metals, La – Eu. With the exception YbB_{12} (where Yb takes an intermediate valence and is a Kondo insulator), the dodecaborides are all metallic compounds. They all have the UB_{12} structure containing a 3 dimensional framework of cubooctahedral B_{12} clusters.

The higher boride LnB_{66} is known for all lanthanide metals. The composition is approximate as the compounds are non-stoichiometric. They all have similar complex structure with over 1600 atoms in the unit cell. The boron cubic sub lattice contains super icosahedra made up of a central B_{12} icosahedra surrounded by 12 others, B_{12}(B_{12})_{12}. Other complex higher borides LnB_{50} (Tb, Dy, Ho Er Tm Lu) and LnB_{25} are known (Gd, Tb, Dy, Ho, Er) and these contain boron icosahedra in the boron framework.

==== Organometallic compounds ====
Lanthanide-carbon σ bonds are well known; however as the 4f electrons have a low probability of existing at the outer region of the atom there is little effective orbital overlap, resulting in bonds with significant ionic character. As such organo-lanthanide compounds exhibit carbanion-like behavior, unlike the behavior in transition metal organometallic compounds. Because of their large size, lanthanides tend to form more stable organometallic derivatives with bulky ligands to give compounds such as Ln[CH(SiMe_{3})_{3}]. Analogues of uranocene are derived from dilithiocyclooctatetraene, Li_{2}C_{8}H_{8}. Organic lanthanide(II) compounds are also known, such as Cp*_{2}Eu.

== Physical properties ==
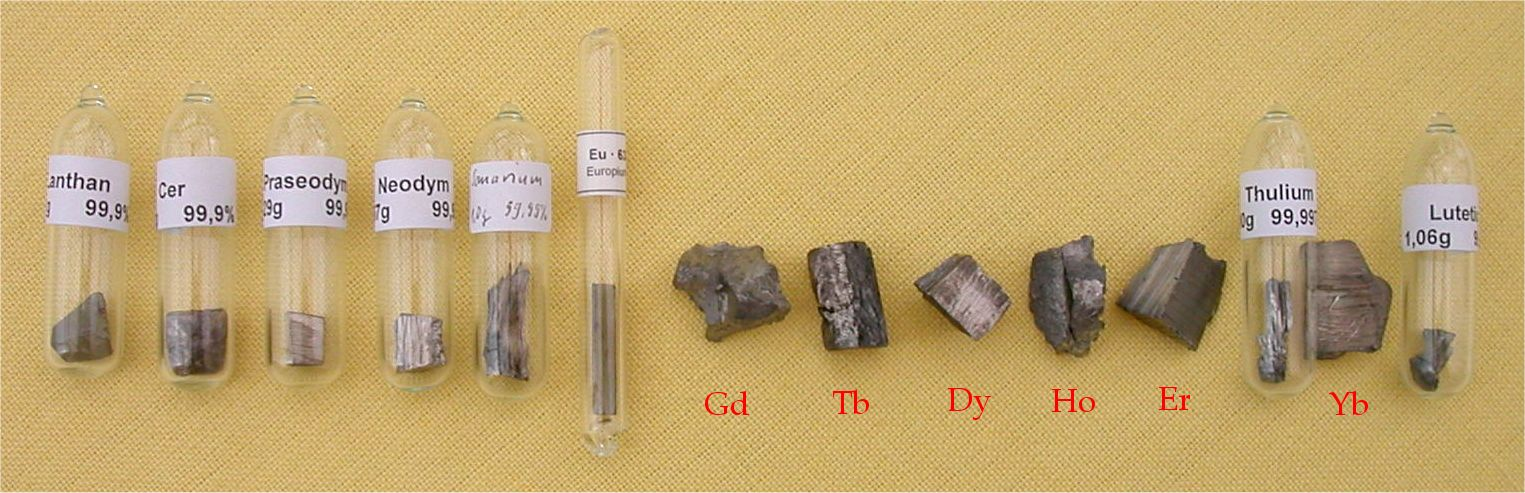
Samples of lanthanide elements (excluding promethium)

=== Magnetic and spectroscopic ===
All the trivalent lanthanide ions, except lanthanum and lutetium, have unpaired f electrons. (Ligand-to-metal charge transfer can nonetheless produce a nonzero f-occupancy even in La(III) compounds.) However, the magnetic moments deviate considerably from the spin-only values because of strong spin–orbit coupling. The maximum number of unpaired electrons is 7, in Gd^{3+}, with a magnetic moment of 7.94 B.M., but the largest magnetic moments, at 10.4–10.7 B.M., are exhibited by Dy^{3+} and Ho^{3+}. However, in Gd^{3+} all the electrons have parallel spin and this property is important for the use of gadolinium complexes as contrast reagent in MRI scans.

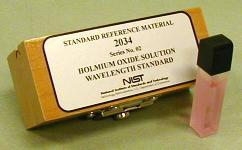
A solution of 4% holmium oxide in 10% perchloric acid, permanently fused into a quartz cuvette as a wavelength calibration standard

Crystal field splitting is rather small for the lanthanide ions and is less important than spin–orbit coupling in regard to energy levels. Transitions of electrons between f orbitals are forbidden by the Laporte rule. Furthermore, because of the "buried" nature of the f orbitals, coupling with molecular vibrations is weak. Consequently, the spectra of lanthanide ions are rather weak and the absorption bands are similarly narrow. Glass containing holmium oxide and holmium oxide solutions (usually in perchloric acid) have sharp optical absorption peaks in the spectral range 200–900 nm and can be used as a wavelength calibration standard for optical spectrophotometers, and are available commercially.

As f-f transitions are Laporte-forbidden, once an electron has been excited, decay to the ground state will be slow. This makes them suitable for use in lasers as it makes the population inversion easy to achieve. The Nd:YAG laser is one that is widely used. Europium-doped yttrium vanadate was the first red phosphor to enable the development of color television screens. Lanthanide ions have notable luminescent properties due to their unique 4f orbitals. Laporte forbidden f-f transitions can be activated by excitation of a bound "antenna" ligand. This leads to sharp emission bands throughout the visible, NIR, and IR and relatively long luminescence lifetimes.

== Occurrence ==
Lanthanides

Lanthanum57La138.91	Cerium58Ce140.12	Praseodymium59Pr140.91	Neodymium60Nd144.24	Promethium61Pm[145]	Samarium62Sm150.36	Europium63Eu151.96	Gadolinium64Gd157.25	Terbium65Tb158.93	Dysprosium66Dy162.50	Holmium67Ho164.93	Erbium68Er167.26	Thulium69Tm168.93	Ytterbium70Yb173.05	Lutetium71Lu174.97

Primordial From decay Synthetic Border shows natural occurrence of the element

Samarskite and similar minerals contain lanthanides in association with the elements such as tantalum, niobium, hafnium, zirconium, vanadium, and titanium, from group 4 and group 5, often in similar oxidation states. Monazite is a phosphate of numerous group 3 + lanthanide + actinide metals and mined especially for the thorium content and specific rare earths, especially lanthanum, yttrium and cerium. Cerium and lanthanum as well as other members of the rare-earth series are often produced as a metal called mischmetal containing a variable mixture of these elements with cerium and lanthanum predominating; it has direct uses such as lighter flints and other spark sources which do not require extensive purification of one of these metals.

There are also lanthanide-bearing minerals based on group-2 elements, such as yttrocalcite, yttrocerite and yttrofluorite, which vary in content of yttrium, cerium, lanthanum and others. Other lanthanide-bearing minerals include bastnäsite, florencite, chernovite, perovskite, xenotime, cerite, gadolinite, lanthanite, fergusonite, polycrase, blomstrandine, håleniusite, miserite, loparite, lepersonnite, euxenite, all of which have a range of relative element concentration and may be denoted by a predominating one, as in monazite-(Ce). Group 3 elements do not occur as native-element minerals in the fashion of gold, silver, tantalum and many others on Earth, but may occur in lunar soil. Very rare halides of cerium, lanthanum, and presumably other lanthanides, feldspars and garnets are also known to exist.

The lanthanide contraction is responsible for the great geochemical divide that splits the lanthanides into light and heavy-lanthanide enriched minerals, the latter being almost inevitably associated with and dominated by yttrium. This divide is reflected in the first two "rare earths" that were discovered: yttria (1794) and ceria (1803). The geochemical divide has put more of the light lanthanides in the Earth's crust, but more of the heavy members in the Earth's mantle. The result is that although large rich ore-bodies are found that are enriched in the light lanthanides, correspondingly large ore-bodies for the heavy members are few. The principal ores are monazite and bastnäsite. Monazite sands usually contain all the lanthanide elements, but the heavier elements are lacking in bastnäsite. The lanthanides obey the Oddo–Harkins rule – odd-numbered elements are less abundant than their even-numbered neighbors.

Three of the lanthanide elements have radioactive isotopes with long half-lives (^{138}La, ^{147}Sm and ^{176}Lu) that can be used to date minerals and rocks from Earth, the Moon and meteorites. Promethium is effectively a man-made element, as all its isotopes are radioactive with half-lives shorter than 20 years.

== Applications ==
=== Industrial ===
Lanthanide elements and their compounds have many uses but the quantities consumed are relatively small in comparison to other elements. About 15000 ton/year of the lanthanides are consumed as catalysts and in the production of glasses. This 15000 tons corresponds to about 85% of the lanthanide production. From the perspective of value, however, applications in phosphors and magnets are more important.

The devices lanthanide elements are used in include superconductors, samarium-cobalt and neodymium-iron-boron high-flux rare-earth magnets, magnesium alloys, electronic polishers, refining catalysts and hybrid car components (primarily batteries and magnets). Lanthanide ions are used as the active ions in luminescent materials used in optoelectronics applications, most notably the Nd:YAG laser. Erbium-doped fiber amplifiers are significant devices in optical-fiber communication systems. Phosphors with lanthanide dopants are also widely used in cathode-ray tube technology such as television sets. The earliest color television CRTs had a poor-quality red; europium as a phosphor dopant made good red phosphors possible. Yttrium iron garnet (YIG) spheres can act as tunable microwave resonators.

Lanthanide oxides are mixed with tungsten to improve their high temperature properties for TIG welding, replacing thorium, which was mildly hazardous to work with. Many defense-related products also use lanthanide elements such as night-vision goggles and rangefinders. The SPY-1 radar used in some Aegis equipped warships, and the hybrid propulsion system of Arleigh Burke-class destroyers all use rare earth magnets in critical capacities. The price for lanthanum oxide used in fluid catalytic cracking has risen from $5 per kilogram in early 2010 to $140 per kilogram in June 2011.

Most lanthanides are widely used in lasers, and as (co-)dopants in doped-fiber optical amplifiers; for example, in Er-doped fiber amplifiers, which are used as repeaters in the terrestrial and submarine fiber-optic transmission links that carry internet traffic. These elements deflect ultraviolet and infrared radiation and are commonly used in the production of sunglass lenses. Other applications are summarized in the following table:

Application	Percentage
Catalytic converters	45%
Petroleum refining catalysts	25%
Permanent magnets	12%
Glass polishing and ceramics	7%
Metallurgical	7%
Phosphors	3%
Other	1%

The complex Gd(DOTA) is used in magnetic resonance imaging.

Mixtures containing all of the lanthanides operating as a single-atom catalysts have been proposed for the electroreduction of carbon dioxide (CO_{2}) to carbon monoxide (CO) with a faradaic efficiency greater than 90%.

=== Radiation resistance ===
Titanium oxides of the lanthanides, Ln_{2}Ti_{2}O_{7}, have potential in the storage of nuclear waste. These compounds can incorporate radioactive actinides and yet resist radiation damage. This resistance depends on the critical amorphization temperature of each lanthanide. The critical amorphization temperature decreases with decreasing lanthanide ionic radius. Consequently, lanthanides of a smaller ionic radius possess a higher radiation resistance than larger lanthanides.

=== Life science ===
Lanthanide complexes can be used for optical imaging. Applications are limited by the lability of the complexes.

Some applications depend on the unique luminescence properties of lanthanide chelates or cryptates. These are well-suited for this application due to their large Stokes shifts and extremely long emission lifetimes (from microseconds to milliseconds) compared to more traditional fluorophores (e.g., fluorescein, allophycocyanin, phycoerythrin, and rhodamine).

The biological fluids or serum commonly used in these research applications contain many compounds and proteins which are naturally fluorescent. Therefore, the use of conventional, steady-state fluorescence measurement presents serious limitations in assay sensitivity. Long-lived fluorophores, such as lanthanides, combined with time-resolved detection (a delay between excitation and emission detection) minimizes prompt fluorescence interference.

Time-resolved fluorometry (TRF) combined with Förster resonance energy transfer (FRET) offers a powerful tool for drug discovery researchers: Time-Resolved Förster Resonance Energy Transfer or TR-FRET. TR-FRET combines the low background aspect of TRF with the homogeneous assay format of FRET. The resulting assay provides an increase in flexibility, reliability and sensitivity in addition to higher throughput and fewer false positive/false negative results.

This method involves two fluorophores: a donor and an acceptor. Excitation of the donor fluorophore (in this case, the lanthanide ion complex) by an energy source (e.g. flash lamp or laser) produces an energy transfer to the acceptor fluorophore if they are within a given proximity to each other (known as the Förster's radius). The acceptor fluorophore in turn emits light at its characteristic wavelength.

The two most commonly used lanthanides in life science assays are shown below along with their corresponding acceptor dye as well as their excitation and emission wavelengths and resultant Stokes shift (separation of excitation and emission wavelengths).

Donor	Excitation⇒Emission λ (nm)	Acceptor	Excitation⇒Emission λ (nm)	Stokes Shift (nm)
Eu^{3+}	340⇒615	Allophycocyanin	615⇒660	320
Tb^{3+}	340⇒545	Phycoerythrin	545⇒575	235

=== Possible medical uses ===
Currently there is research showing that lanthanide elements can be used as anticancer agents. The main role of the lanthanides in these studies is to inhibit proliferation of the cancer cells. Specifically cerium and lanthanum have been studied for their role as anti-cancer agents.

One of the specific elements from the lanthanide group that has been tested and used is cerium (Ce). There have been studies that use a protein-cerium complex to observe the effect of cerium on the cancer cells. The hope was to inhibit cell proliferation and promote cytotoxicity. Transferrin receptors in cancer cells, such as those in breast cancer cells and epithelial cervical cells, promote the cell proliferation and malignancy of the cancer. Transferrin is a protein used to transport iron into the cells and is needed to aid the cancer cells in DNA replication. Transferrin acts as a growth factor for the cancerous cells and is dependent on iron. Cancer cells have much higher levels of transferrin receptors than normal cells and are very dependent on iron for their proliferation.

In the field of magnetic resonance imaging (MRI), compounds containing gadolinium are utilized extensively.

The photobiological characteristics, anticancer, anti-leukemia, and anti-HIV activities of the lanthanides with coumarin and its related compounds are demonstrated by the biological activities of the complex.

Cerium has shown results as an anti-cancer agent due to its similarities in structure and biochemistry to iron. Cerium may bind in the place of iron on to the transferrin and then be brought into the cancer cells by transferrin-receptor mediated endocytosis. The cerium binding to the transferrin in place of the iron inhibits the transferrin activity in the cell. This creates a toxic environment for the cancer cells and causes a decrease in cell growth. This is the proposed mechanism for cerium's effect on cancer cells, though the real mechanism may be more complex in how cerium inhibits cancer cell proliferation. Specifically in HeLa cancer cells studied in vitro, cell viability was decreased after 48 to 72 hours of cerium treatments. Cells treated with just cerium had decreases in cell viability, but cells treated with both cerium and transferrin had more significant inhibition for cellular activity.

Another specific element that has been tested and used as an anti-cancer agent is lanthanum, more specifically lanthanum chloride (LaCl_{3}). The lanthanum ion is used to affect the levels of let-7a and microRNAs miR-34a in a cell throughout the cell cycle. When the lanthanum ion was introduced to the cell in vivo or in vitro, it inhibited the rapid growth and induced apoptosis of the cancer cells (specifically cervical cancer cells). This effect was caused by the regulation of the let-7a and microRNAs by the lanthanum ions. The mechanism for this effect is still unclear but it is possible that the lanthanum is acting in a similar way as the cerium and binding to a ligand necessary for cancer cell proliferation.

== Biological effects ==
Due to their sparse distribution in the earth's crust and low aqueous solubility, the lanthanides have a low availability in the biosphere, and for a long time were not known to naturally form part of any biological molecules. In 2007 a novel methanol dehydrogenase that strictly uses lanthanides as enzymatic cofactors was discovered in a bacterium from the phylum Verrucomicrobiota, Methylacidiphilum fumariolicum. This bacterium was found to survive only if there are lanthanides present in the environment. Compared to most other nondietary elements, non-radioactive lanthanides are classified as having low toxicity. The same nutritional requirement has also been observed in Methylorubrum extorquens and Methylobacterium radiotolerans.

== See also ==
- Actinides, the heavier congeners of the lanthanides
- Group 3 element
- Lanthanide probes

== Cited sources ==
- Holleman, Arnold F.; Wiberg, Egon; Wiberg, Nils (2007). Lehrbuch der Anorganischen Chemie (in German) (102 ed.). Walter de Gruyter. ISBN 978-3-11-017770-1.
