= Neodymium hydride =

Neodymium hydride may refer to:

- Neodymium dihydride (Neodymium(II) hydride), NdH_{2}
- Neodymium trihydride (Neodymium(III) hydride), NdH_{3}
