= Ytterbium chloride =

Ytterbium chloride may refer to either of these ytterbium compounds:

- Ytterbium(II) chloride, YbCl_{2}
- Ytterbium(III) chloride, YbCl_{3}
