= Thulium fluoride =

Thulium fluoride may refer to:

- Thulium(II) fluoride (Thulium difluoride), TmF_{2}
- Thulium(III) fluoride (Thulium trifluoride), TmF_{3}
