= Cerium anomaly =

Concentration of cerium vs. other rare-earth metals

The cerium anomaly, in geochemistry, is the phenomenon whereby cerium (Ce) concentration is either depleted or enriched in a rock relative to the other rare-earth elements (REEs). A Ce anomaly is said to be "negative" if Ce is depleted relative to the other REEs and is said to be "positive" if Ce is enriched relative to the other REEs.

== Cerium oxidation states ==
Cerium is a rare-earth element (lanthanide) characterized by two different redox states: III and IV. Contrary to other lanthanide elements, which are only trivalent (with the notable exception of Eu^{2+}), Ce^{3+} can be oxidized by atmospheric oxygen (O_{2}) to Ce^{4+} under alkaline conditions.

The cerium anomaly relates to the decrease in solubility, which accompanies the oxidation of Ce(III) to Ce(IV). Under reducing conditions, Ce^{3+} is relatively soluble, while under oxidizing conditions CeO_{2} precipitates. Sediments deposited under oxic or anoxic conditions can preserve on the long term the geochemical signature of Ce^{3+} or Ce^{4+} upon reserve that no early diagenetic transformation altered it.

== Cerium anomalies in zircon ==
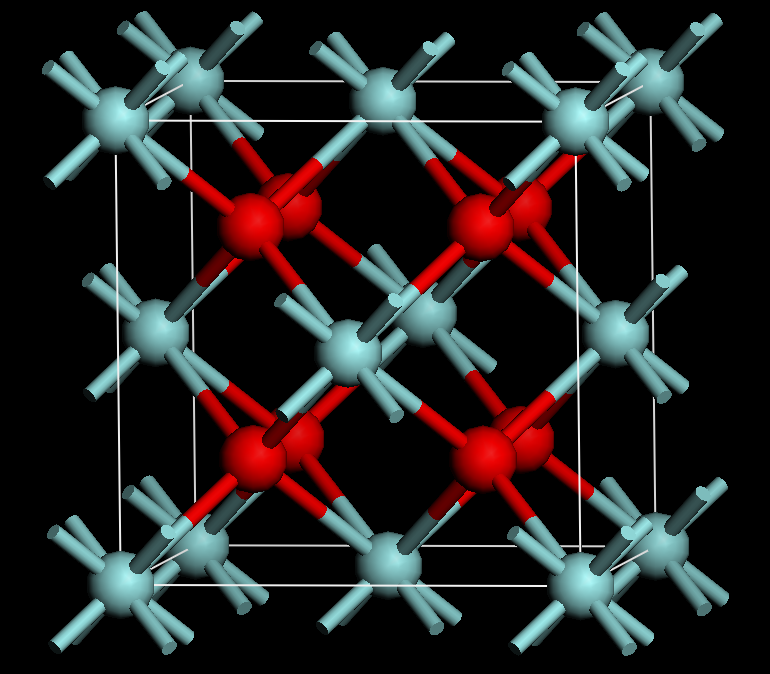
Crystal structure of Ceria-zirconia. Ce^{4+} has the same charge and similar ionic radius as Zr^{4+} resulting in elemental substitution and therefore a positive cerium anomaly.

Zircon (ZrSiO_{4}) is commonly found in felsic igneous rock. Because both Ce^{3+} and Ce^{4+} can substitute for zirconium, Zircon often has a positive Ce anomaly. Ce^{4+} substitutes with Zr much more easily than Ce^{3+} because Ce^{4+} (ionic radius 0.97Å) has the same charge and a similar ionic radius as Zr^{4+} (ionic radius 0.84Å). Therefore, the oxidation state of the magma is what determines the Ce anomaly in Zircon. If the oxygen fugacity is high, more Ce^{3+} will oxidize to Ce^{4+} and create a larger positive Ce anomaly in the zircon structure. At lower levels of oxygen fugacity, the level of Ce anomaly will also be lower.

== Cerium anomalies in coal ==
=== Negative cerium anomalies ===
Cerium in coal is typically weakly negative, meaning that it is present at slightly lower concentrations than the other rare-earth elements. Cerium anomalies in coal are influenced by the sediment source region. Coal mined from mafic regions dominated by basalts, such as the location of the Xinde Mine in China, does not have a Ce-anomaly. In contrast, coal mined in felsic rock regions, such as Guxu Coalfield in China, does have weakly negative Ce-anomalies. Negative Ce-anomalies can also be attributed to the weathering and oxidation of the coal-mining region. During oxidation, Ce^{3+} precipitates out as CeO_{2}, leaving less Ce in the coal.

=== Positive cerium anomalies ===
While cerium anomalies in coal are usually negative, they can rarely be positive as well. This can occur during volcanic eruptions when volcanic ash is weathered into mafic tuffs with positive Ce-anomalies. The Pavlovka deposit in Far East Russia has large positive Ce-anomalies in its Fe-Mn oxyhydroxide ores. Because cerium is one of only two REEs that can obtain an oxidation number of +4, Ce^{4+} is absorbed into Mn(IV) oxides instead of other REEs and this results in a positive Ce-anomaly.

== See also ==
- Cerium
- Europium
- Europium anomaly
- Lanthanides
- Rare-earth elements
