= Europium anomaly =

Relative europium concentration in a mineral is either enriched or depleted

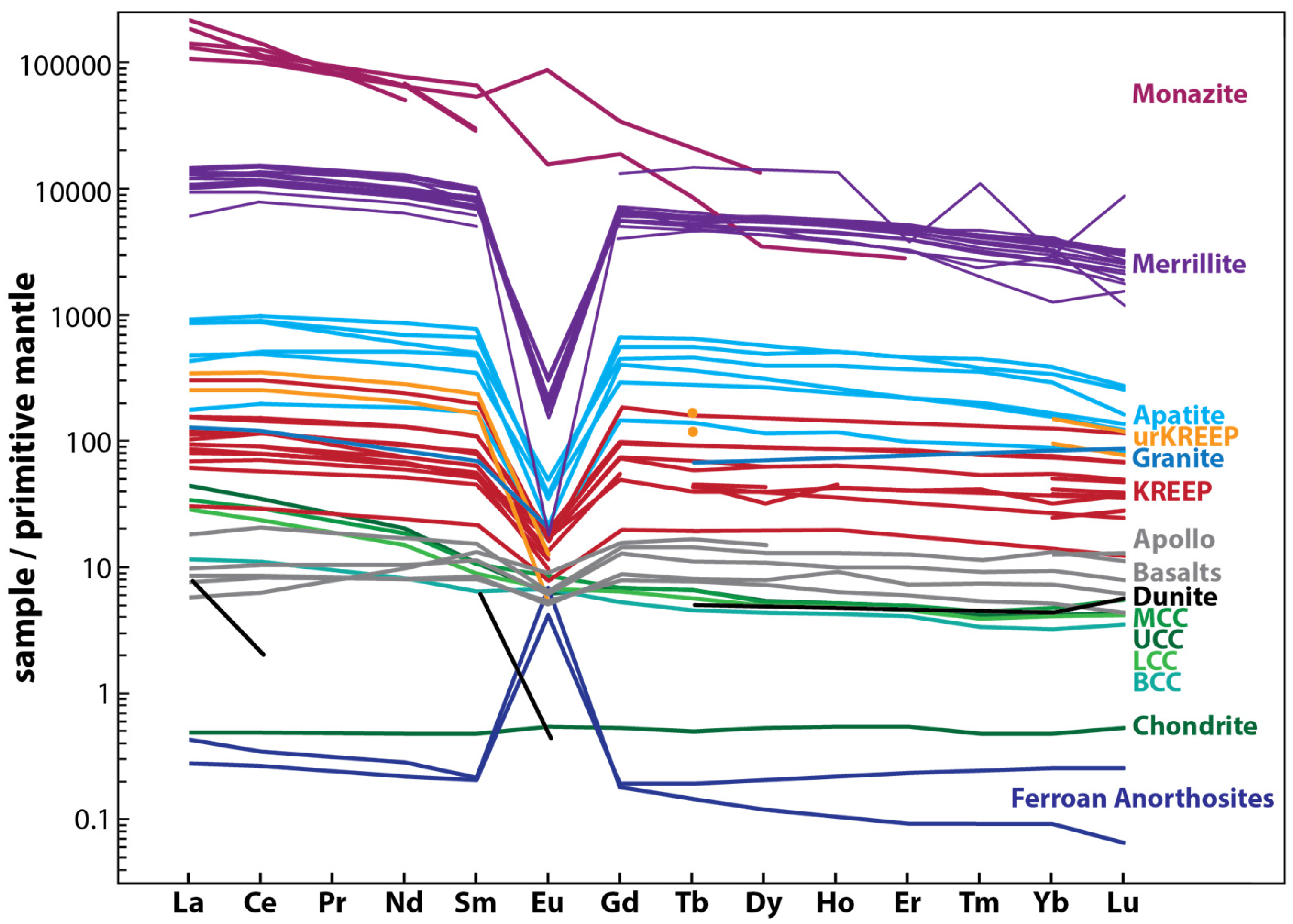
Rare-earth element abundances of basalts, of both terrestrial and lunar origins

The europium anomaly refers to the enrichment or depletion of the europium concentration in a mineral or rock compared to neighboring rare-earth elements also present in the material. This anomaly is typically evaluated relative to a common standard such as a chondrite or mid-ocean ridge basalt (MORB). In geochemistry a europium anomaly is said to be "positive" if the Eu concentration in the mineral is enriched relative to the other rare-earth elements (REEs), and is said to be "negative" if Eu is depleted relative to the other REEs.

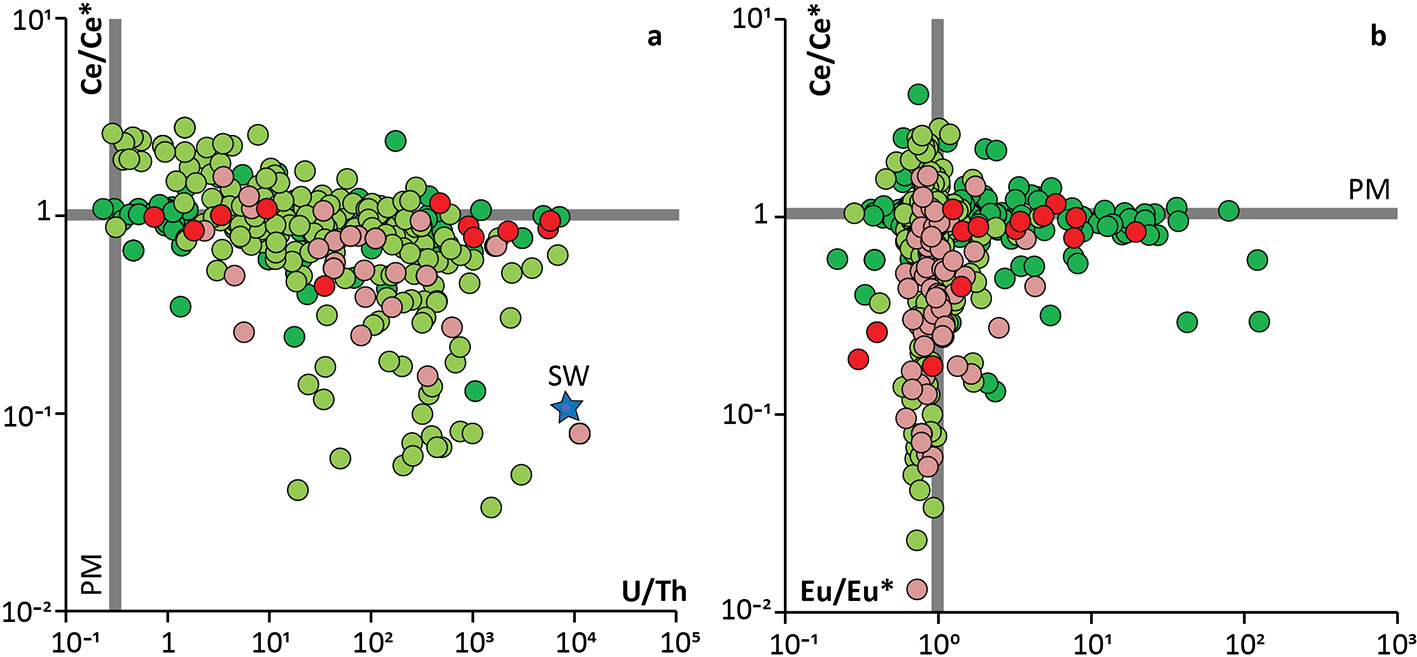
Ce and Eu anomalies characteristic of serpentinite found in ultra-slow spreading ridges and transform faults.

== Oxidation states and partitioning behavior ==
Most REEs exist in the trivalent state (3+), but europium and cerium (Ce) exhibit additional oxidation states that affect their geochemical behavior. Europium can be reduced to Eu²⁺, especially under reducing magmatic conditions making it immiscible with other REEs. Meanwhile, cerium may be oxidized to Ce⁴⁺. These alternate valences impact how the elements partition between minerals.

Eu (2+) cations are similar in size and carry the same charge as Ca^{2+}, an ion found in plagioclase and other minerals. While Eu is an incompatible element in its trivalent form (Eu^{3+}) in an oxidizing magma, it is preferentially incorporated into plagioclase in its divalent form (Eu^{2+}) in a reducing magma, where it substitutes for calcium (Ca^{2+}).

== Calculating europium anomalies ==
REE enrichments like Eu anomalies have been commonly utilized to measure the impact of anthropogenic activities in water bodies and sediments. The Eu anomaly, in general, provides insight into temperature and redox conditions and allows researchers to infer speciation and REE mobility in different environments. Eu anomalies initially were utilized in describing water and sediment geochemistry but have also been used with further application in biological organisms and environmental risk assessment as a result of REE contamination.

Eu anomalies are commonly assessed using normalized REE concentrations. A general formula to determine the Eu anomaly is:

$\frac{\text{REE}_n}{ \text{REE}^* _n} = 2 \frac{[\text{REE}]_n}{ ([\text{REE}]_{n-1} + [\text{REE}]_{n+1})}$

where n represents the atomic number of the REE, and ∗ refers to the geogenic background concentration.

Among the most widely used equations for europium anomaly calculations:

$\text{Eu} / \text{Eu}^* = \text{Eu}_N / \sqrt{\text{Sm}_N \cdot \text{Gd}_N}$ accounts for nearly half of papers

$\text{Eu} / \text{Eu}^* = 2\text{Eu}_N / (\text{Sm}_N \cdot \text{Gd}_N)$ accounts for another about 15.5%

When gadolinium has anomalous chemistry, the equation using Tb is used instead. $\text{Eu} / \text{Eu}^* = \text{Eu}_N / (0.67\text{Sm}_N + 0.33\text{Tb}_N)$

The symbology δEu is sometimes used to denote the europium anomaly.

Advanced modeling may incorporate additional REEs or site-specific background data to improve resolution in complex environments.

== Behavior of europium in oceanic fluids ==
In normal seawater conditions, europium remains in the trivalent state (Eu³⁺) across depths and environments, showing no distinct anomaly due to stable redox conditions and long residence times (~410 years). Seawater REE levels generally do not display a europium anomaly, and Eu behaves similarly to other trivalent REEs. However, hydrothermal vent systems at mid-ocean ridges emit hot, acidic, chloride-rich fluids enriched in REEs—often by 1–2 orders of magnitude greater than ambient seawater.

In these reducing environments, Eu³⁺ is reduced to Eu²⁺, which is more soluble. As a result, hydrothermal fluids exhibit positive Eu anomalies compared to surrounding seawater. This anomaly is an indicator of redox conditions in hydrothermal systems.

== Serpentinites and redox effects ==
Serpentinization—the alteration of mantle rocks through interaction with seawater—can result in enrichment of various elements. The Eu anomaly serves as a useful tracer of these redox-sensitive processes.

In hydrothermal environments, Eu²⁺ is mobile at high temperatures. As hydrothermal fluids cool, Eu reverts to Eu³⁺, which is less soluble and is more readily adsorbed onto minerals. In serpentinites, Eu is often present as a surface coating because it is too large to be easily incorporated into the serpentine crystal lattice. This process is most effective under specific redox conditions and is associated with positive Eu anomalies.

At ultra-slow spreading ridges and transform faults, positive Eu anomalies are particularly notable in serpentinites. Forearc serpentinites may show weaker anomalies influenced by slab-derived fluids. Overall, redox conditions rather than temperature alone appear to be the dominant control on Eu behavior in these systems.

== Partitioning in magma ==
In igneous systems, Eu²⁺ can substitute for Ca²⁺ in plagioclase under reducing conditions. Under oxidizing conditions, Eu remains as Eu³⁺ and does not substitute into plagioclase as easily. Thus, plagioclase crystallization under reducing conditions can result in positive Eu anomalies, while magmas depleted in plagioclase may show negative anomalies.

== On the Moon ==
A well-known example of the Eu anomaly is seen on the Moon. REE analyses of the Moon's light-colored lunar highlands show a large positive Eu anomaly due to the plagioclase-rich anorthosite comprising the highlands. The darker lunar mare, consisting mainly of basalt, shows a large negative Eu anomaly. This has led geologists to speculate as to the genetic relationship between the lunar highlands and mare. It is possible that much of the Moon's Eu was incorporated into the earlier, plagioclase-rich highlands, leaving the later basaltic mare strongly depleted in Eu.

== See also ==
- Cerium
- Cerium anomaly
- Europium
- Lanthanides
- Rare-earth elements
