= Neodymium(II) hydride =

Identifiers
| CAS Number | 13863-22-4 |
| 3D model (JSmol) | Interactive image |
- InChI: InChI=1S/Nd.2H/q+2;2*-1 Key: SRPYKTZQYBYMQZ-UHFFFAOYSA-N
- SMILES: [H-].[H-].[Nd+2]

Properties
| Chemical formula | H_{2}Nd |
| Molar mass | 146.258 g·mol^{−1} |

Related compounds
| Related compounds | neodymium(III) hydride |
- Except where otherwise noted, data are given for materials in their standard state (at 25 °C [77 °F], 100 kPa). Infobox references

Neodymium dihydride is an inorganic compound, with the chemical formula of NdH_{2}, although it is an electride, and it is actually composed of Nd^{3+}(e^{−})(H^{−})_{2}. It is ferromagnetic.

== Chemical properties ==
Neodymium dihydride reacts with lithium borohydride to obtain neodymium tetraboride:

NdH_{2} + 4 LiBH_{4} → NdB_{4} + 4 LiH + 7 H_{2}↑

== See also ==
- Europium hydride
- Ytterbium hydride

== External reading ==
- Struss, Arthur W.; Corbett, John D. Reaction of hydrogen with metallic and reduced halides. The requirement of delocalized electrons for reaction. Inorganic Chemistry, 1978. 17(4): 965-9. DOI:10.1021/ic50182a034
