= Neodymium(III) hydride =

Names
- Other names Neodymium(III) hydride

Identifiers
| CAS Number | 13864-04-5 |
| 3D model (JSmol) | Interactive image |
| ChemSpider | 146069 |
| ECHA InfoCard | 100.034.177 |
| EC Number | 237-610-3 |
| PubChem CID | 166940 |
| CompTox Dashboard (EPA) | DTXSID501346032 |
- InChI: InChI=1S/Nd Key: InChIKey=QEFYFXOXNSNQGX-UHFFFAOYSA-N
- SMILES: [NdH3]

Properties
| Chemical formula | NdH_{3} |

Hazards
- GHS labelling
| Pictograms | (GHS02: Flammable) (GHS07: Exclamation mark) |
| Signal word | Danger |
| Hazard statements | H250, H260, H315, H319 |
| Precautionary statements | P210, P222, P223, P231, P231+P232, P233, P264, P264+P265, P280, P302+P335+P334, P302+P352, P305+P351+P338, P321, P332+P317, P337+P317, P362+P364, P370+P378, P402+P404, P501 |

Related compounds
| Other anions | Neodymium(III) oxide Neodymium(III) acetate Neodymium(III) chloride |
| Other cations | europium hydride ytterbium hydride |
- Except where otherwise noted, data are given for materials in their standard state (at 25 °C [77 °F], 100 kPa). Infobox references

Neodymium(III) hydride is an inorganic compound composed of neodymium and hydrogen with a chemical formula NdH_{3}. In this compound, the neodymium atom is in the +3 oxidation state and the hydrogen atoms are −1. It is highly reactive.

== Preparation ==
Neodymium(III) hydride can be produced by directly reacting neodymium and hydrogen gas:

2Nd + 3H_{2} → 2NdH_{3}

It can also be made by hydrogenating neodymium(II) hydride.

== Properties ==
Neodymium hydride is a blue crystal of the hexagonal system, with unit cell parameters a=0.385 nm, c=0.688 nm.

It reacts with water to form neodymium hydroxide and hydrogen gas:

NdH_{3} + 3 H_{2}O → Nd(OH)_{3} + 3 H_{2}

== See also ==
- Neodymium
- Hydrogen
- Lanthanide
