= Cerium(IV) fluoride =

Cerium(IV) fluoride Cerium tetrafluoride
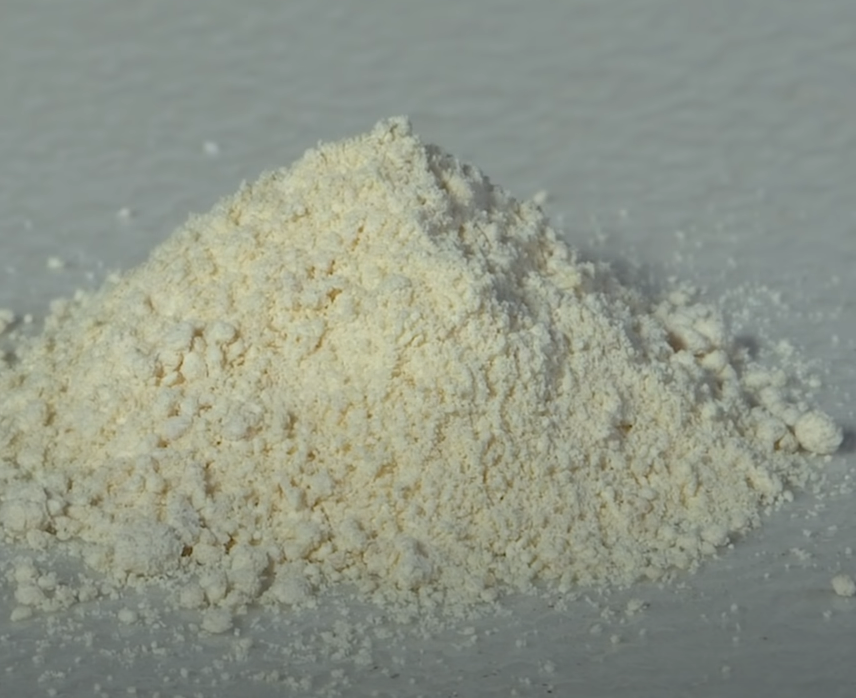

Identifiers
CAS Number	10060-10-3
3D model (JSmol)	Interactive image
ChemSpider	74302
ECHA InfoCard	100.155.130
EC Number	626-760-9
PubChem CID	82331
UNII	A381976S11
CompTox Dashboard (EPA)	DTXSID3064934
- InChI: InChI=1S/Ce.4FH/h;4*1H/q+4;;;;/p-4 Key: SWURHZJFFJEBEE-UHFFFAOYSA-J
- SMILES: F[Ce](F)(F)F

Properties
Chemical formula	CeF_{4}
Molar mass	216.11
Appearance	white powder
Density	4.77g/cm^{3}
Melting point	650 °C (1,202 °F; 923 K)
Boiling point	n/a
Solubility in water	n/a

Hazards
- GHS labelling
Pictograms	(GHS07: Exclamation mark)
Signal word	Warning
Hazard statements	H302, H312, H315, H319, H332, H335
Precautionary statements	P261, P264, P270, P271, P280, P301+P312, P302+P352, P304+P312, P304+P340, P305+P351+P338, P312, P321, P322, P330, P332+P313, P337+P313, P362, P363, P403+P233, P405, P501
- Except where otherwise noted, data are given for materials in their standard state (at 25 °C [77 °F], 100 kPa). Infobox references

Cerium(IV) fluoride is an inorganic compound with a chemical formula CeF_{4}. It is a strong oxidant that appears as a white crystalline material. Cerium(IV) fluoride has an anhydrous form and a monohydrate form.

== Production and properties ==
Cerium(IV) fluoride can be produced by fluorinating cerium(III) fluoride or cerium dioxide with fluorine gas at 500 °C

$$\mathrm{ 2 \ CeF_3 + F_2 \longrightarrow 2 \ CeF_4 }$$
$$\mathrm{ CeO_2 + 2 \ F_2 \longrightarrow CeF_4 + O_2 }$$

Its hydrated form (CeF_{4}·xH_{2}O, x≤1) can be produced by reacting 40% hydrofluoric acid and cerium(IV) sulfate solution at 90°C.

Cerium(IV) fluoride can dissolve in DMSO, and react to form the coordination complex [CeF_{4}(DMSO)_{2}].
