= Yttrium borides =

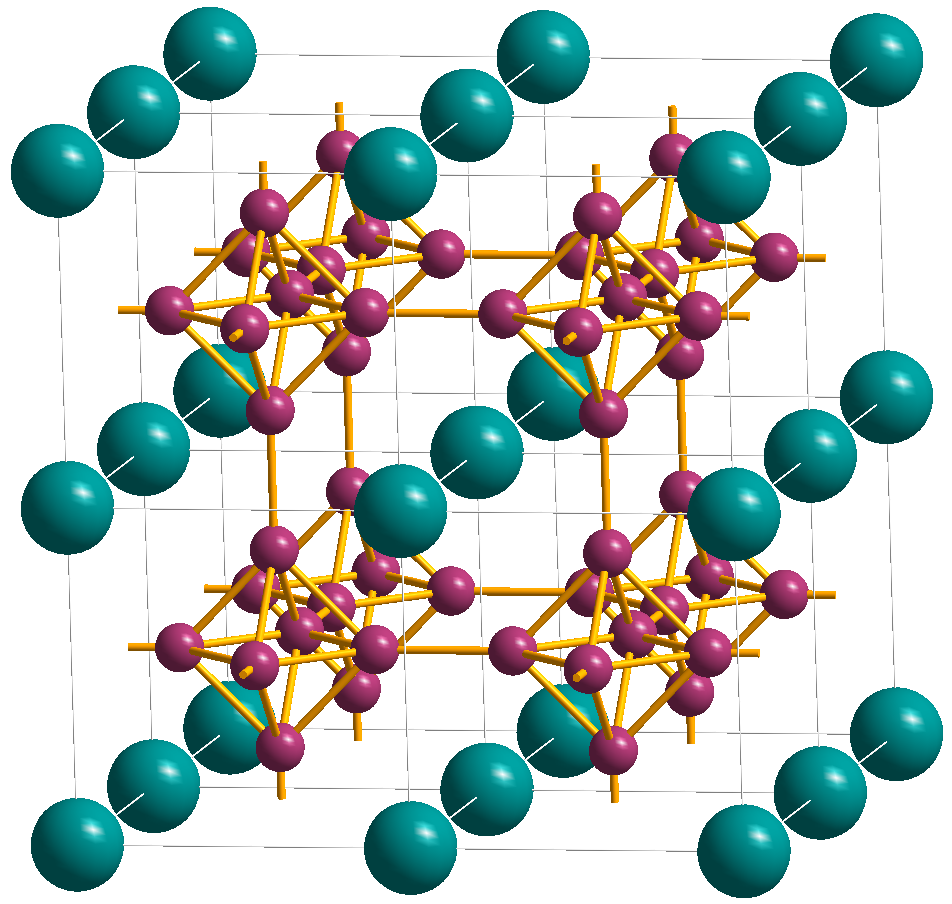
- 12008-32-1

Identifiers
CAS Number	YB_{6}: 12008-32-1
3D model (JSmol)	YB_{2}: Interactive image; YB_{6}: Interactive image
ChemSpider	YB_{6}: 62852861
PubChem CID	YB_{2}: 58262254; YB_{6}: 25022291
- InChI: YB_{2}: InChI=1S/B2.Y/c1-2; Key: YOSZWMPJVDQOCZ-UHFFFAOYSA-N; YB_{6}: InChI=1S/6B.Y Key: LBQSRCUUAYSSDR-UHFFFAOYSA-N
- SMILES: YB_{2}: [B][B].[Y]; YB_{6}: [B].[B].[B].[B].[B].[B].[Y]

Properties
Chemical formula	YB_{66}/YB_{50}/YB_{25}/YB_{12}/YB_{6}/YB_{4}
Molar mass	153.77
Appearance	Gray-Black powder, Metallic
Density	2.52 g/cm^{3} --- YB_{66} 2.72 g/cm^{3} --- YB_{50} 3.02 g/cm^{3} --- YB_{25} 3.44 g/cm^{3} --- YB_{12} 3.67 g/cm^{3} --- YB_{6} 4.32 g/cm^{3} --- YB_{4}
Melting point	2,750–2,000 °C (4,980–3,630 °F; 3,020–2,270 K)
Solubility in water	Insoluble

Structure
Crystal structure	cubic, cP7
Space group	Pm3̅m, No. 221
Lattice constant	a = 0.41132 nm

Hazards
NFPA 704 (fire diamond)	0 0 0
Flash point	Non-flammable
Safety data sheet (SDS)	External MSDS
- Except where otherwise noted, data are given for materials in their standard state (at 25 °C [77 °F], 100 kPa). verify (what is ?) Infobox references

Yttrium boride refers to a crystalline material composed of different proportions of yttrium and boron, such as YB_{2}, YB_{4}, YB_{6}, YB_{12}, YB_{25}, YB_{50} and YB_{66}. They are all gray-colored, hard solids having high melting temperatures. The most common form is the yttrium hexaboride YB_{6}. It exhibits superconductivity at relatively high temperature of 8.4 K and, similar to LaB_{6}, is an electron cathode. Another remarkable yttrium boride is YB_{66}. It has a large lattice constant (2.344 nm), high thermal and mechanical stability, and therefore is used as a diffraction grating for low-energy synchrotron radiation (1–2 keV).

== YB_{2} (yttrium diboride) ==
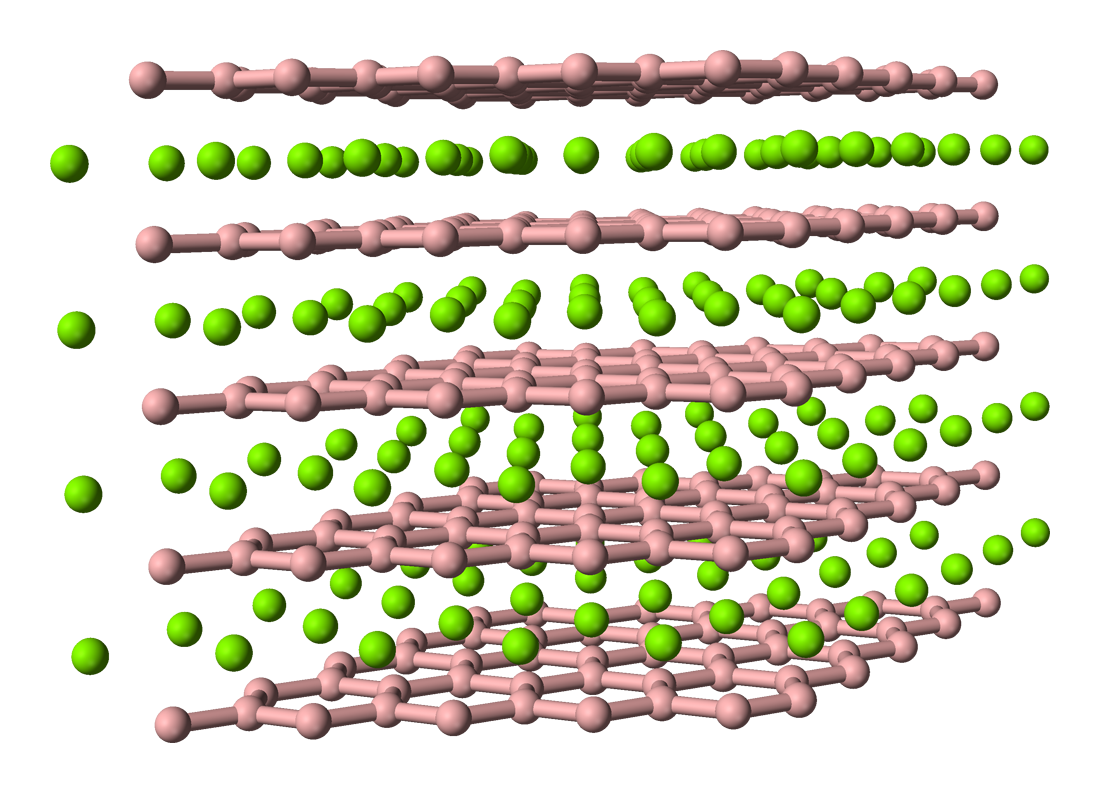
Structure of YB_{2}

Yttrium diboride has the same hexagonal crystal structure as aluminium diboride and magnesium diboride – an important superconducting material. Its Pearson symbol is hP3, space group P6/mmm (No 191), a = 0.33041 nm, c = 0.38465 nm and the calculated density is 5.05 g/cm^{3}. In this structure, the boron atoms form graphite like sheets with yttrium atoms between them. YB_{2} crystals are unstable to moderate heating in air – they start oxidizing at 400 °C and completely oxidize at 800 °C. YB_{2} melts at ~2100 °C.

== YB_{4} (yttrium tetraboride) ==
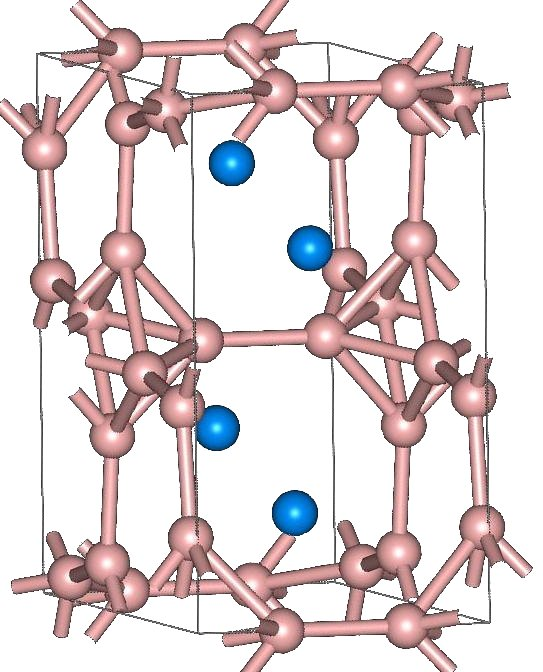
Structure of YB_{4}

YB_{4} has tetragonal crystal structure with space group P4/mbm (No. 127), Pearson symbol tP20, a = 0.711 nm, c = 0.4019 nm, calculated density 4.32 g/cm^{3}. High-quality YB_{4} crystals of few centimeters in size can be grown by the multiple-pass floating zone technique.

== YB_{6} (yttrium hexaboride) ==
YB_{6} is a black odorless powder having density of 3.67 g/cm^{3}; it has the same cubic crystalline structure as other hexaborides (CaB_{6}, LaB_{6}, etc., see infobox). High-quality YB_{6} crystals of few centimeters in size can be grown by the multiple-pass floating zone technique. YB_{6} is a superconductor with the relatively high transition temperature (onset) of 8.4 K.

== YB_{12} (yttrium dodecaboride) ==
YB_{12} crystals have a cubic structure with density of 3.44 g/cm^{3}, Pearson symbol cF52, space group Fm3̅m (No. 225), a = 0.7468 nm. Its structural unit is _{12} cuboctahedron. The Debye temperature of YB_{12} is ~1040 K, and it is not superconducting at temperatures above 2.5 K.

== YB_{25} ==
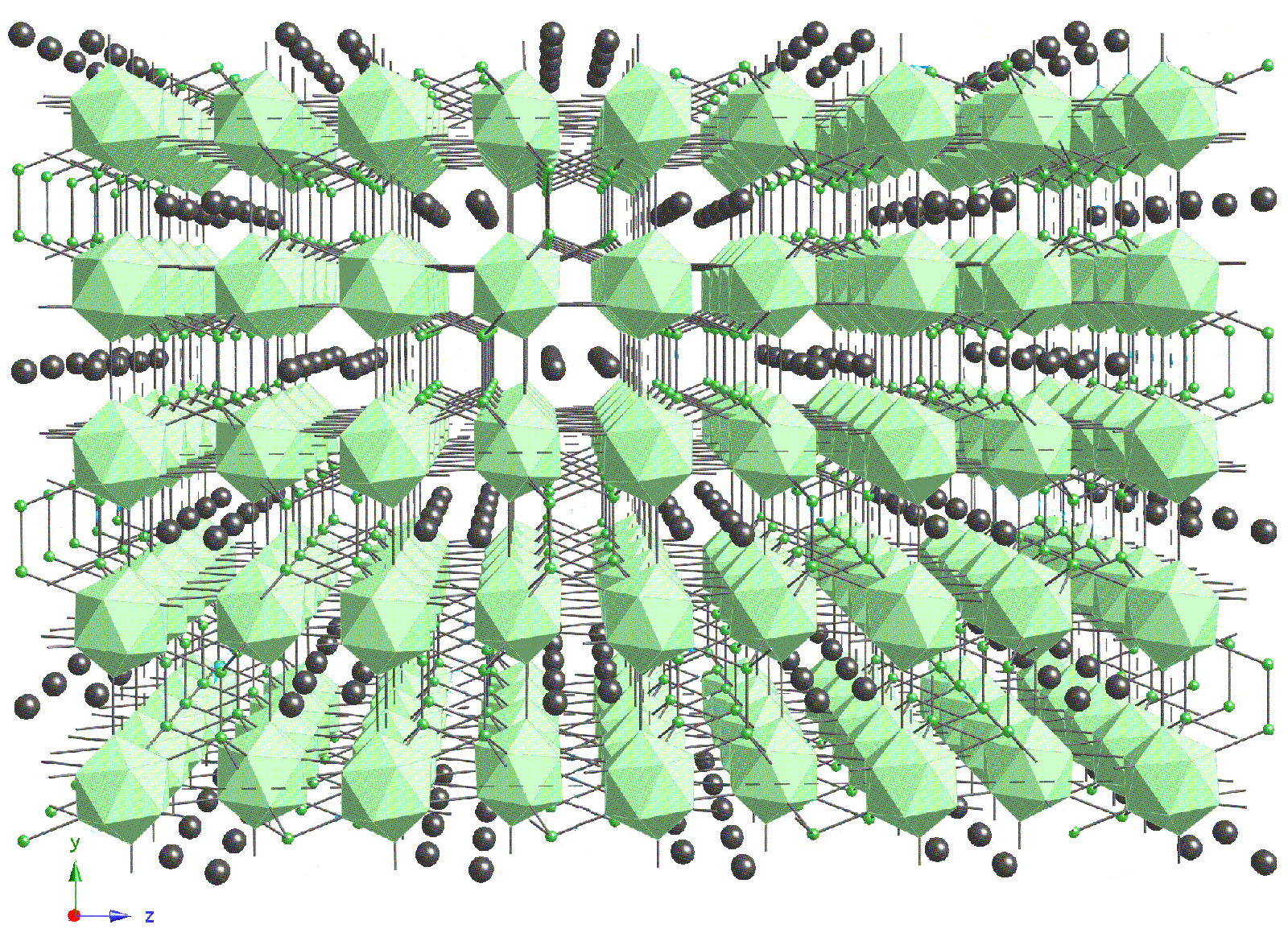
Crystal structure of YB_{25}. Black and green spheres indicate Y and B atoms, respectively.

The structure of yttrium borides with B/Y ratio of 25 and above consists of a network of B_{12} icosahedra. The boron framework of YB_{25} is one of the simplest among icosahedron-based borides – it consists of only one kind of icosahedra and one bridging boron site. The bridging boron site is tetrahedrally coordinated by four boron atoms. Those atoms are another boron atom in the counter bridge site and three equatorial boron atoms of one of three B_{12} icosahedra. The yttrium sites have partial occupancies of ca. 60–70%, and the YB_{25} formula merely reflects the average atomic ratio [B]/[Y] = 25. Both the Y atoms and B_{12} icosahedra form zigzags along the x-axis. The bridging boron atoms connect three equatorial boron atoms of three icosahedra and those icosahedra make up a network parallel to the (101) crystal plane (x-z plane in the figure). The bonding distance between the bridging boron and the equatorial boron atoms is 0.1755 nm, which is typical for the strong covalent B-B bond (bond length 0.17–0.18 nm); thus, the bridging boron atoms strengthen the individual network planes. On the other hand, the large distance between the boron atoms within the bridge (0.2041 nm) reveals a weaker interaction, and thus the bridging sites contribute little to the bonding between the network planes.

YB_{25} crystals can be grown by heating a compressed pellet of yttria (Y_{2}O_{3}) and boron powder to ~1700 °C. The YB_{25} phase is stable up to 1850 °C. Above this temperature it decomposes into YB_{12} and YB_{66} without melting. This makes it difficult to grow a single crystal of YB_{25} by the melt growth method.

== YB_{50} ==
YB_{50} crystals have orthorhombic structure with space group P2_{1}2_{1}2 (No. 18), a = 1.66251 nm, b = 1.76198 nm, c = 0.94797 nm. They can be grown by heating a compressed pellet of yttria (Y_{2}O_{3}) and boron powder to ~1700 ^{0}C. Above this temperature YB_{50} decomposes into YB_{12} and YB_{66} without melting. This makes it difficult to grow a single crystal of YB_{50} by the melt growth method. Rare earth elements from Tb to Lu can also crystallize in the M_{50} form.

== YB_{66} ==
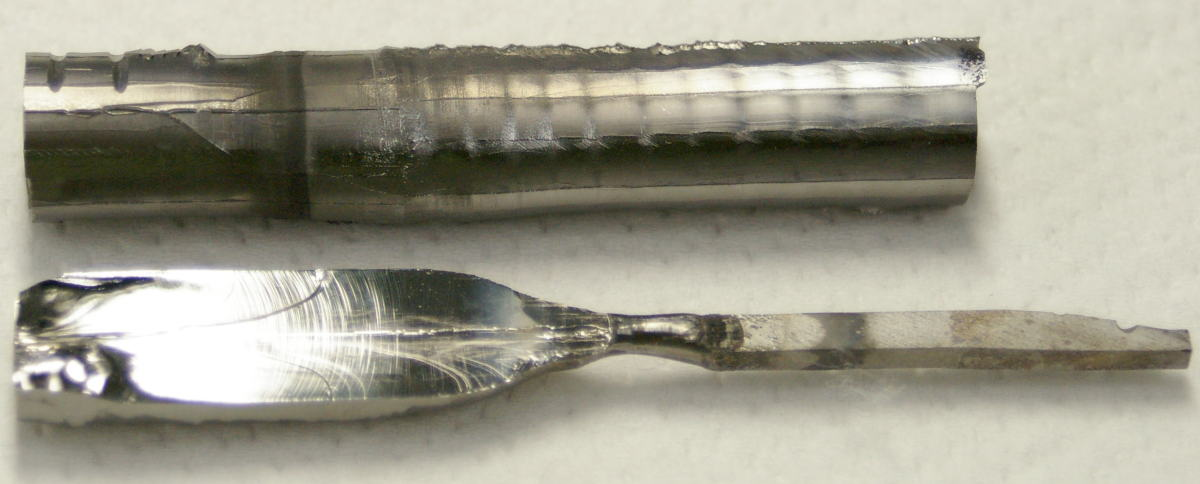
Two single crystals of YB_{66} grown by floating zone technique using (100) oriented seeds. In the top crystal, the seed (left from the black line) has same diameter as the crystal. In the bottom crystal (sliced), the seed is much thinner and is on the right

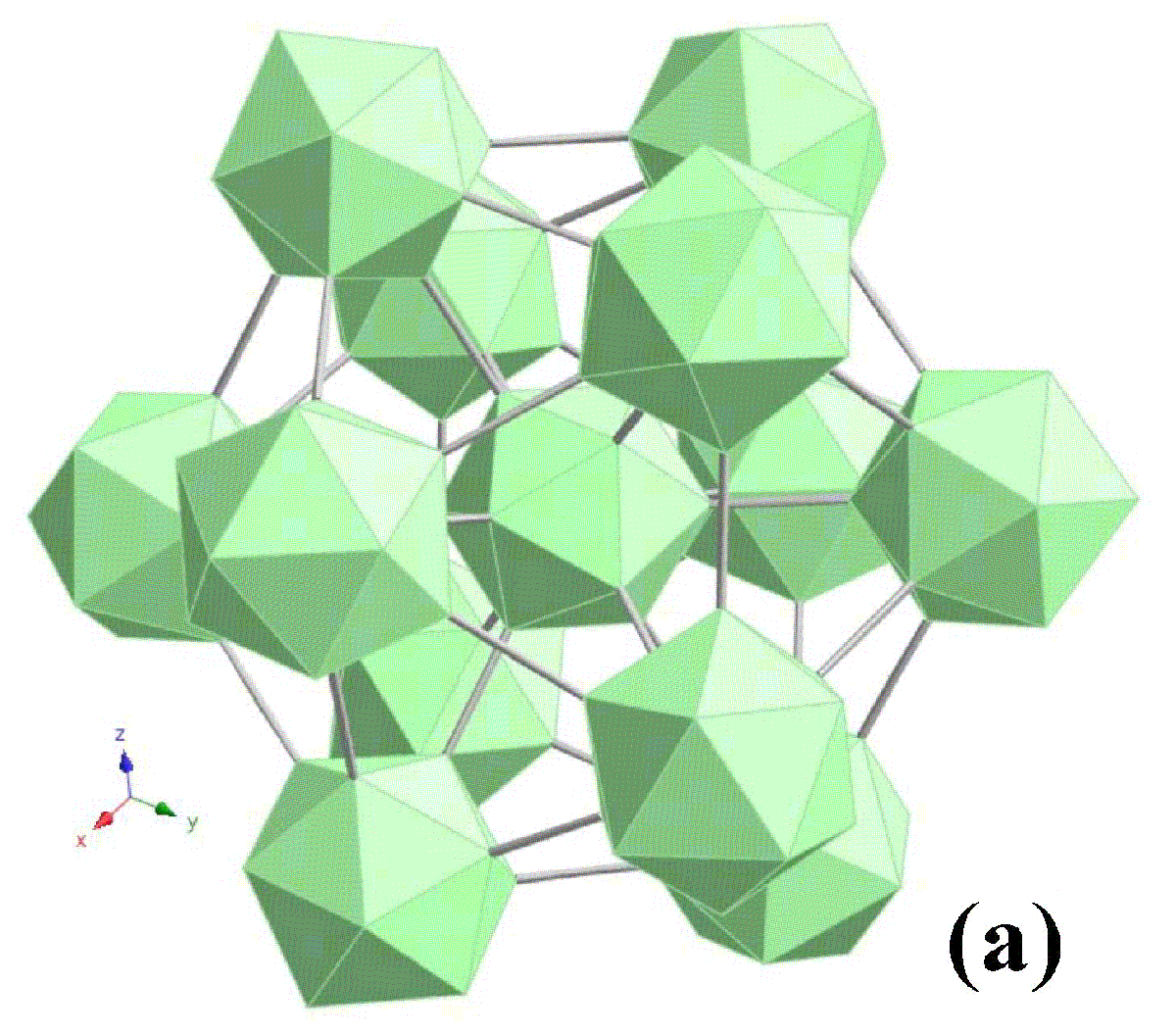
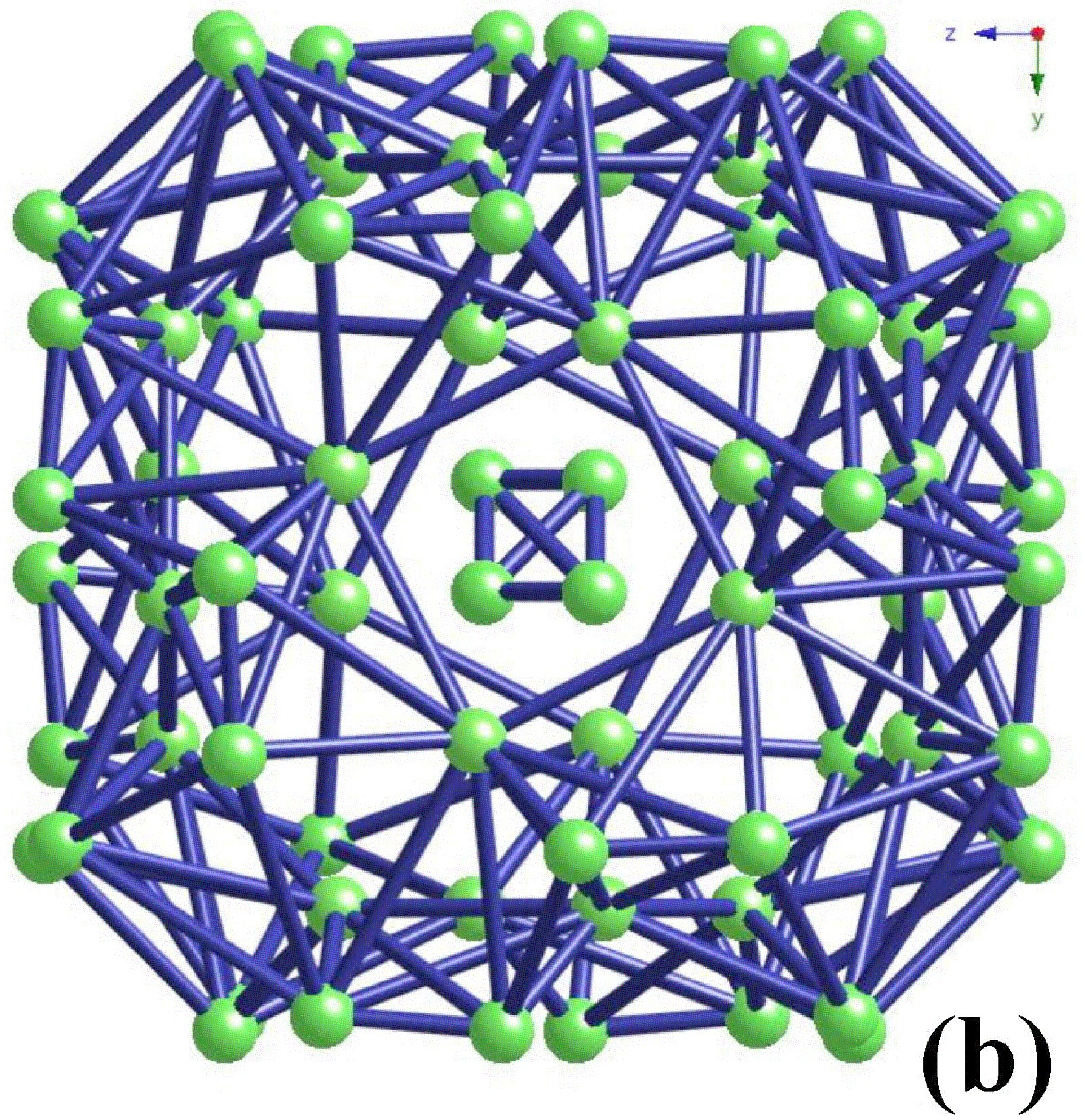
(a) Thirteen-icosahedron unit (B_{12})_{12}B_{12} (supericosahedron), and (b) B_{80} cluster unit of the YB_{66} structure. The excessive bonding in panel (b) is because it assumes that all sites are occupied, whereas the total number of boron atoms is only 42.

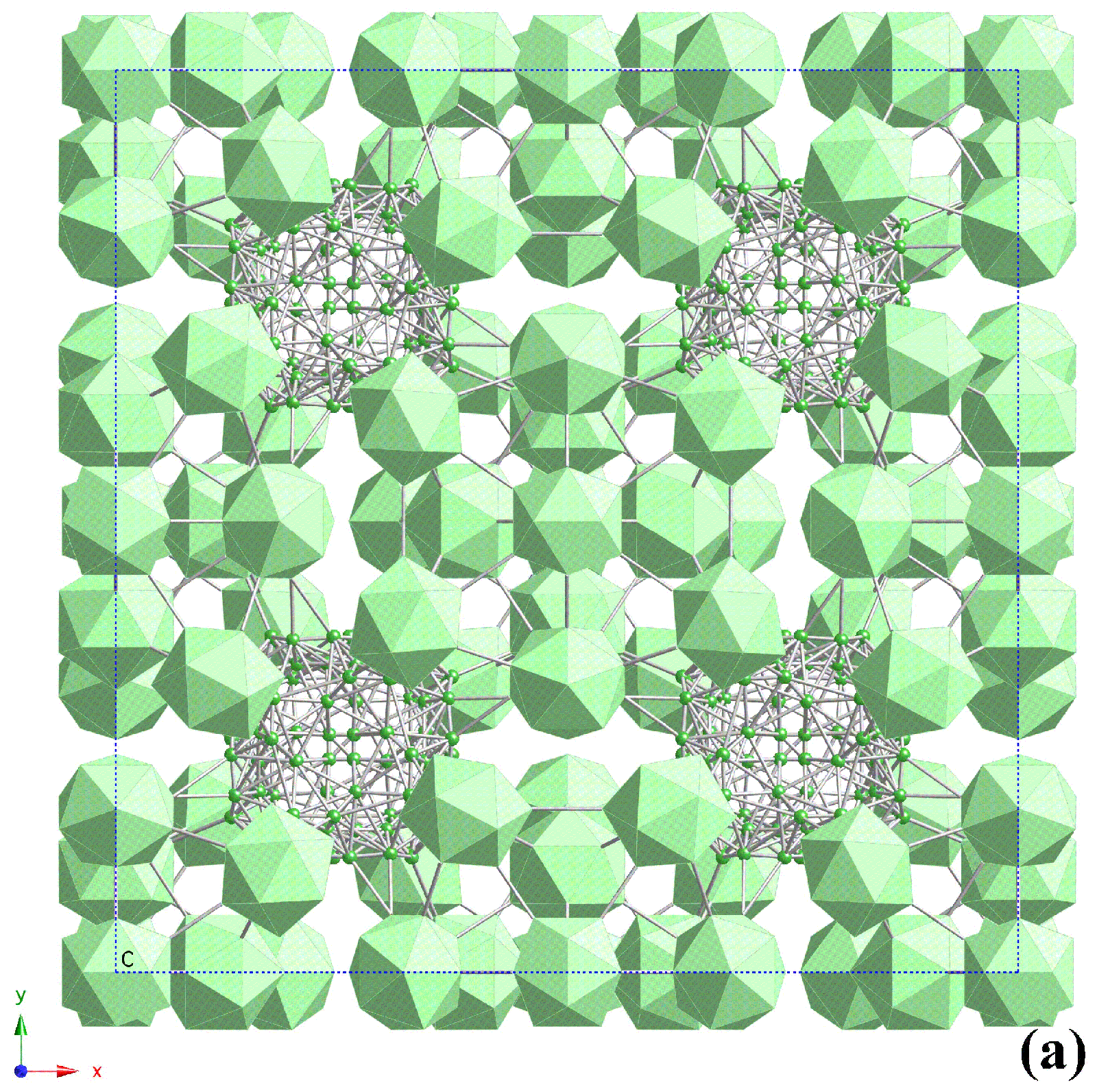
The boron framework of YB_{66} viewed along the z-axis.

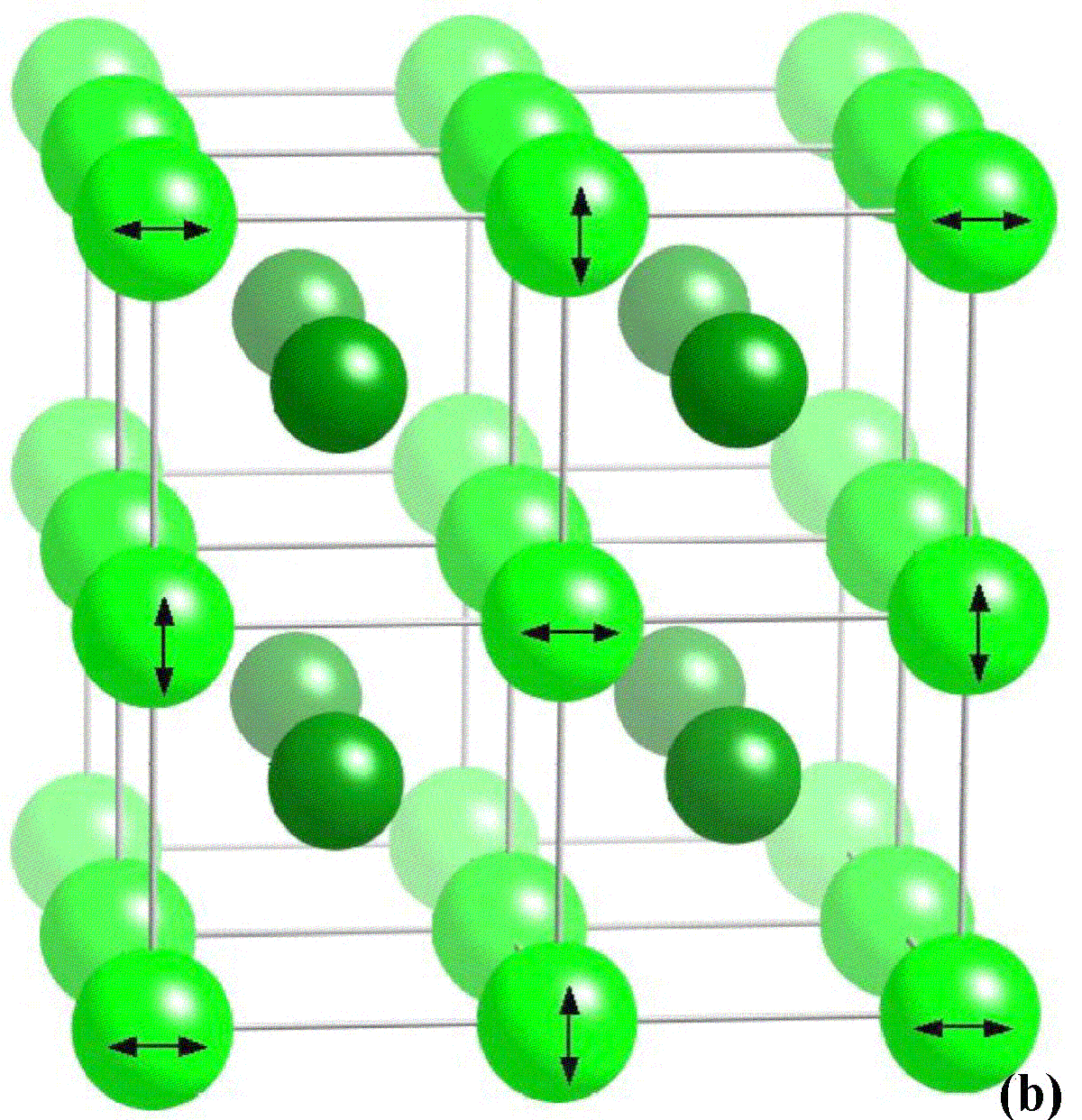
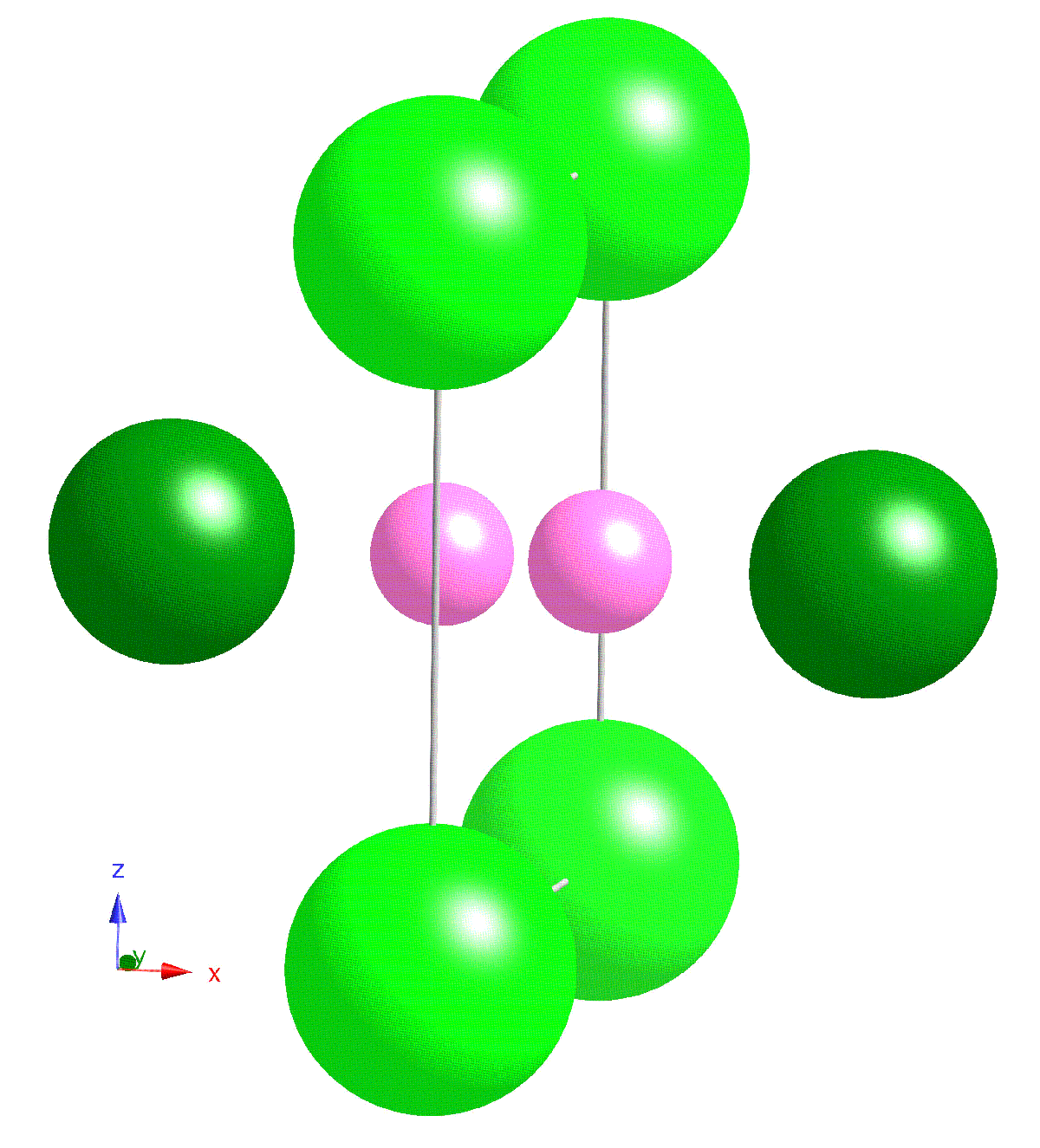
Left: Schematically drawn boron framework of YB_{66}. Light green spheres show the boron supericosahedra and their relative orientations are indicated by arrows. Dark green spheres correspond to the B_{80} clusters. Right: Pair of Y sites (pink spheres) in YB_{66}. Light green spheres show the boron supericosahedron and dark green spheres correspond to the B_{80} clusters.

YB_{66} was discovered in 1960 and its structure was solved in 1969. The structure is face-centered cubic, with space group Fm3̅c (No. 226), Pearson symbol cF1936 and lattice constant a = 2.3440(6) nm. There are 13 boron sites B1–B13 and one yttrium site. The B1 sites form one B_{12} icosahedron and the B2–B9 sites make up another icosahedron. These icosahedra arrange in a thirteen-icosahedron unit (B_{12})_{12}B_{12} which is called supericosahedron. The icosahedron formed by the B1 site atoms is located at the center of the supericosahedron. The supericosahedron is one of the basic units of the boron framework of YB_{66}. There are two types of supericosahedra: one occupies the cubic face centers and another, which is rotated by 90°, is located at the center of the cell and at the cell edges. Thus, there are eight supericosahedra (1248 boron atoms) in the unit cell.

Another structure unit of YB_{66} is B_{80} cluster of 80 boron sites formed by the B10 to B13 sites. All those 80 sites are partially occupied and in total contain only ca. 42 boron atoms. The B_{80} cluster is located at the body center of the octant of the unit cell, i.e., at the 8a position (1/4, 1/4, 1/4); thus, there are eight such clusters (336 boron atoms) per unit cell. Two independent structure analyses came to the same conclusion that the total number of boron atoms in the unit cell is 1584. The boron framework structure of YB_{66} is shown in the figure to the right. A schematic drawing under it indicates relative orientations of the supericosahedra, and the B_{80} clusters are depicted by light green and dark green spheres, respectively; at the top surface of the unit cell, the relative orientations of the supericosahedra are indicated by arrows. There are 48 yttrium sites ((0.0563, 1/4, 1/4) for YB_{62}) in the unit cell. Fixing the occupancy of the Y site to 0.5 results in 24 Y atoms in the unit cell and the chemical composition of YB_{66}; this occupancy of 0.5 implies that the yttrium pair has always one Y atom with one empty site.

YB_{66} has density 2.52 g/cm^{3}, low thermal conductivity of 0.02 W/(cm·K), elastic constants c_{11} = 3.8 billion and c_{44} = 1.6 billion Newton/m^{2} and Debye temperature of 1300 K. As all yttrium borides, YB_{66} is a hard material and exhibits Knoop hardness of 26 GPa. High-quality YB_{66} crystals of few centimeters in size can be grown by the multiple-pass floating zone technique and be used as X-ray monochromators.

The large unit cell of YB_{66} results in large lattice constant of 2.344 nm. This property, together with high thermal and mechanical stability resulted in application of YB_{66} as dispersive elements of X-ray monochromators for low energy radiation (1–2 keV).

== See also ==
- Crystal structure of boron-rich metal borides
