= Thulium(III) fluoride =

Identifiers
CAS Number	13760-79-7
3D model (JSmol)	Interactive image
ChemSpider	75532
ECHA InfoCard	100.033.943
EC Number	237-353-7
PubChem CID	83710
UNII	GY8H9KPZ7R
CompTox Dashboard (EPA)	DTXSID8065612
- InChI: InChI=1S/3FH.Tm/h3*1H;/q;;;+3/p-3 Key: AATUHDXSJTXIHB-UHFFFAOYSA-K
- SMILES: F[Tm](F)F

Properties
Chemical formula	TmF_{3}

Hazards
- GHS labelling
Pictograms	(GHS06: Toxic) (GHS07: Exclamation mark)
Signal word	Danger
Hazard statements	H301, H311, H315, H319, H331, H335
Precautionary statements	P261, P264, P270, P271, P280, P301+P310, P302+P352, P304+P340, P305+P351+P338, P311, P312, P321, P322, P330, P332+P313, P337+P313, P361, P362, P363, P403+P233, P405, P501
- Except where otherwise noted, data are given for materials in their standard state (at 25 °C [77 °F], 100 kPa). Infobox references

Thullium(III) fluoride is an inorganic compound with the chemical formula TmF_{3}.

== Production ==
It can be produced by reacting thulium(III) sulfide and hydrofluoric acid, followed by thermal decomposition:

3 Tm_{2}S_{3} + 20 HF + (2 + 2x)H_{2}O → 2 (H_{3}O)Tm_{3}F_{10}·xH_{2}O↓ + 9 H_{2}S↑ (x=1.7)
(H_{3}O)Tm_{3}F_{10} → 3 TmF_{3} + HF↑ + H_{2}O↑

Thulium(III) oxide reacts with fluorinating agents such as hydrogen fluoride, nitrogen trifluoride xenon difluoride to create thullium(III) fluoride as well, although the reaction with nitrogen trifluoride is incomplete and produces a mixture of TmOF and TmF_{3}.
