= Ytterbium(II) hydride =

Names
- Other names Ytterbium hydride Ytterbium dihydride

Identifiers
CAS Number	13598-40-8
3D model (JSmol)	Interactive image
PubChem CID	129676857
- InChI: InChI=1S/Yb.2H Key: LIQBHNROMLKXKC-UHFFFAOYSA-N
- SMILES: [YbH2]

Properties
Chemical formula	YbH_{2}
Appearance	solid

Related compounds
Other anions	ytterbium(II) chloride
- Except where otherwise noted, data are given for materials in their standard state (at 25 °C [77 °F], 100 kPa). Infobox references

Ytterbium(II) hydride is the hydride of ytterbium with the chemical formula YbH_{2}. In this compound, the ytterbium atom has an oxidation state of +2 and the hydrogen atoms have an oxidation state of −1. Its resistivity at room temperature is 10^{7} Ω·cm. Ytterbium hydride has a high thermostability.

== Production ==
Ytterbium hydride can be produced by reacting ytterbium with hydrogen gas:

Yb + H_{2} → YbH_{2}
