= Ytterbium(II) chloride =

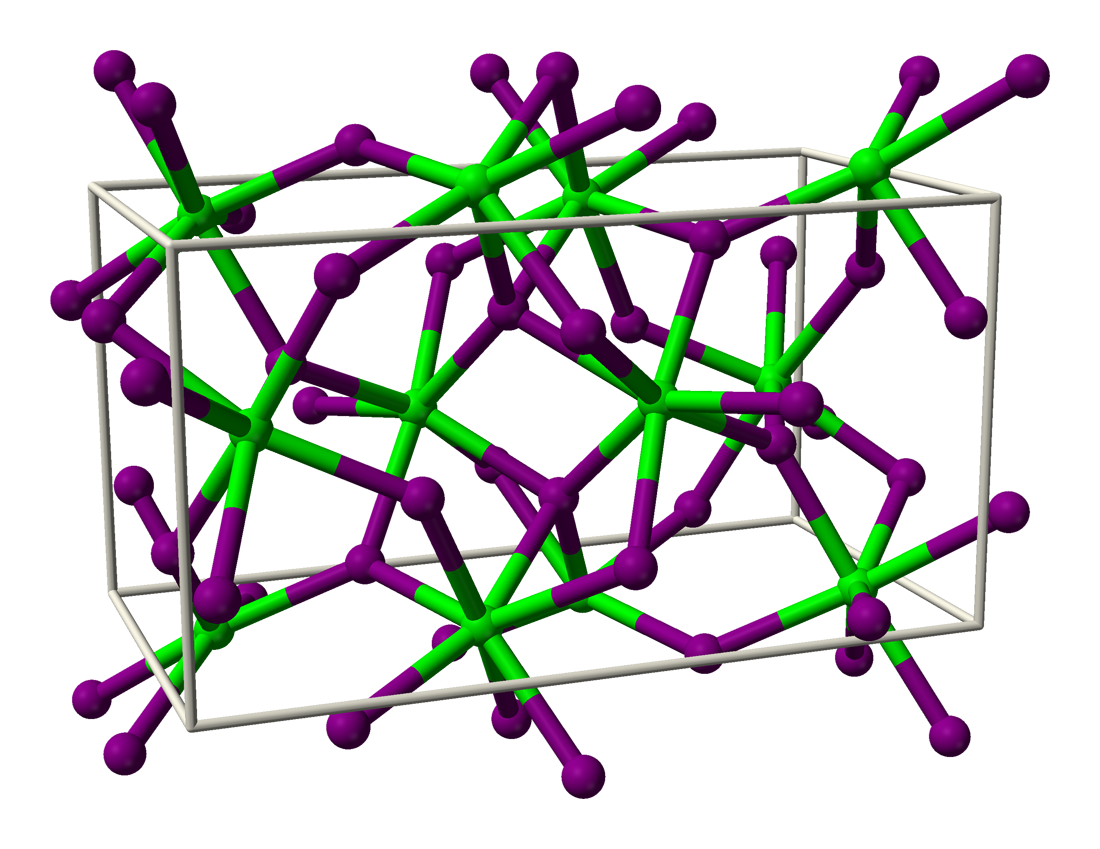
- Ytterbium(II) chloride

Names
- Other names ytterbium dichloride

Identifiers
CAS Number	13874-77-6
3D model (JSmol)	Interactive image
ChemSpider	75606
ECHA InfoCard	100.034.197
EC Number	237-632-3
PubChem CID	83785
CompTox Dashboard (EPA)	DTXSID90930206
- InChI: InChI=1S/2ClH.Yb/h2*1H;/q;;+2/p-2 Key: LINIOGPXIKIICR-UHFFFAOYSA-L; InChI=1S/2ClH.Yb/h2*1H;/q;;+2/p-2; Key: LINIOGPXIKIICR-UHFFFAOYSA-L
- SMILES: [Yb+2].[Cl-].[Cl-]

Properties
Chemical formula	YbCl_{2}
Molar mass	243.95 g/mol
Appearance	green crystals
Density	5.27 g/cm^{3}, solid
Melting point	721 °C (1,330 °F; 994 K)
Solubility in water	reacts

Structure
Crystal structure	Orthorhombic, oP24
Space group	Pbca, No. 61
- Except where otherwise noted, data are given for materials in their standard state (at 25 °C [77 °F], 100 kPa). verify (what is ?) Infobox references

Ytterbium(II) chloride (YbCl_{2}) is an inorganic chemical compound. It was first prepared in 1929 by W. K. Klemm and W. Schuth, by reduction of ytterbium(III) chloride, YbCl_{3}, using hydrogen.

2 YbCl_{3} + H_{2} → 2 YbCl_{2} + 2 HCl

Like other Yb(II) compounds and other low-valence rare earth compounds, it is a strong reducing agent. It is unstable in aqueous solution, reducing water to hydrogen gas.
