= Actinium compounds =

Actinium compounds are compounds containing the element actinium (Ac). Due to actinium's intense radioactivity, only a limited number of actinium compounds are known. These include: AcF_{3}, AcCl_{3}, AcBr_{3}, AcOF, AcOCl, AcOBr, Ac_{2}S_{3}, Ac_{2}O_{3}, AcPO_{4} and Ac(NO_{3})_{3}. Except for AcPO_{4}, they are all similar to the corresponding lanthanum compounds. They all contain actinium in the oxidation state +3. In particular, the lattice constants of the analogous lanthanum and actinium compounds differ by only a few percent.

== Properties of actinium compounds ==
Formula	color	symmetry	space group	No	Pearson symbol	a (pm)	b (pm)	c (pm)	Z	density, g/cm^{3}
Ac	silvery	fcc	Fm3̅m	225	cF4	531.1	531.1	531.1	4	10.07
AcH_{2}	unknown	cubic	Fm3̅m	225	cF12	567	567	567	4	8.35
Ac_{2}O_{3}	white	trigonal	P3̅m1	164	hP5	408	408	630	1	9.18
Ac_{2}S_{3}	black	cubic	I4̅3d	220	cI28	778.56	778.56	778.56	4	6.71
AcF_{3}	white	hexagonal	P3̅c1	165	hP24	741	741	755	6	7.88
AcCl_{3}	white	hexagonal	P6_{3}/m	165	hP8	764	764	456	2	4.8
AcBr_{3}	white	hexagonal	P6_{3}/m	165	hP8	764	764	456	2	5.85
AcOF	white	cubic	Fm3̅m			593.1				8.28
AcOCl	white	tetragonal				424	424	707		7.23
AcOBr	white	tetragonal				427	427	740		7.89
AcPO_{4}·0.5H_{2}O	unknown	hexagonal				721	721	664		5.48

Here a, b and c are lattice constants, No is space group number and Z is the number of formula units per unit cell. Density was not measured directly but calculated from the lattice parameters.

== Oxides ==
Actinium(III) oxide is the only oxide that actinium can form, with the chemical formula Ac_{2}O_{3}. In this compound, actinium is in the oxidation state +3. It is similar to the corresponding lanthanum compound, lanthanum(III) oxide. It can be obtained by heating the hydroxide at 500 °C or the oxalate at 1100 °C, in vacuum. Its crystal lattice is isotypic with the oxides of most trivalent rare-earth metals.

== Halides ==
Actinium trifluoride can be produced either in solution or in solid reaction. The former reaction is carried out at room temperature, by adding hydrofluoric acid to a solution containing actinium ions. In the latter method, actinium metal is treated with hydrogen fluoride vapors at 700 °C in an all-platinum setup. Treating actinium trifluoride with ammonium hydroxide at 900–1000 °C yields oxyfluoride AcOF. Whereas lanthanum oxyfluoride can be easily obtained by burning lanthanum trifluoride in air at 800 °C for an hour, similar treatment of actinium trifluoride yields no AcOF and only results in melting of the initial product.

AcF_{3} + 2 NH_{3} + H_{2}O → AcOF + 2 NH_{4}F

Actinium trichloride is obtained by reacting actinium hydroxide or oxalate with carbon tetrachloride vapors at temperatures above 960 °C. Similar to oxyfluoride, actinium oxychloride can be prepared by hydrolyzing actinium trichloride with ammonium hydroxide at 1000 °C. However, in contrast to the oxyfluoride, the oxychloride could well be synthesized by igniting a solution of actinium trichloride in hydrochloric acid with ammonia.

Reaction of aluminium bromide and actinium oxide yields actinium tribromide:

Ac_{2}O_{3} + 2 AlBr_{3} → 2 AcBr_{3} + Al_{2}O_{3}

and treating it with ammonium hydroxide at 500 °C results in the oxybromide AcOBr.

== Other compounds ==
Actinium hydride was obtained by reduction of actinium trichloride with potassium at 300 °C, and its structure was deduced by analogy with the corresponding LaH_{2} hydride. The source of hydrogen in the reaction was uncertain.

Mixing monosodium phosphate (NaH_{2}PO_{4}) with a solution of actinium in hydrochloric acid yields white-colored actinium phosphate hemihydrate (AcPO_{4}·0.5H_{2}O), and heating actinium oxalate with hydrogen sulfide vapors at 1400 °C for a few minutes results in a black actinium sulfide Ac_{2}S_{3}. It may possibly be produced by acting with a mixture of hydrogen sulfide and carbon disulfide on actinium oxide at 1000 °C.

== See also ==
- Thorium compounds
- Protactinium compounds
