= Actinium(III) iodide =

Names
- Other names Actinium triiodide

Identifiers
| CAS Number | 33689-82-6 |
| 3D model (JSmol) | Interactive image |
| PubChem CID | 101943122 |
- InChI: InChI=1S/Ac.3HI/h;3*1H/q+3;;;/p-3 Key: GEJMCLWCDCNLDP-UHFFFAOYSA-K
- SMILES: [I-].[I-].[I-].[Ac+3]

Properties
| Chemical formula | AcI_{3} |
| Molar mass | 607.7412 g/mol |
| Appearance | White crystalline solid |

Related compounds
| Other anions | Actinium(III) fluoride Actinium(III) chloride Actinium(III) bromide |
| Other cations | Lanthanum(III) iodide |
- Except where otherwise noted, data are given for materials in their standard state (at 25 °C [77 °F], 100 kPa). Infobox references

Actinium(III) iodide is the a salt of the radioactive metal actinium. It is a white crystalline solid. This compound was made by heating actinium oxide with a mixture of aluminium metal and iodine at 700 °C for two hours.
