= Actinium(III) oxalate =

Identifiers
CAS Number	7264-35-9
3D model (JSmol)	Interactive image; decahydrate: Interactive image
- InChI: InChI=1S/3C2H2O4.2Ac/c3*3-1(4)2(5)6;;/h3*(H,3,4)(H,5,6);;/q;;;2*+3/p-6 Key: HUVUSUACYJRSII-UHFFFAOYSA-H; decahydrate: InChI=1S/3C2H2O4.2Ac.10H2O/c3*3-1(4)2(5)6;;;;;;;;;;;;/h3*(H,3,4)(H,5,6);;;10*1H2/q;;;2*+3;;;;;;;;;;/p-6 Key: WECZHEJINJOCSI-UHFFFAOYSA-H
- SMILES: C(=O)(C(=O)[O-])[O-].C(=O)(C(=O)[O-])[O-].C(=O)(C(=O)[O-])[O-].[Ac+3].[Ac+3]; decahydrate: C(=O)(C(=O)[O-])[O-].C(=O)(C(=O)[O-])[O-].C(=O)(C(=O)[O-])[O-].[Ac+3].[Ac+3].O.O.O.O.O.O.O.O.O.O

Properties
Chemical formula	Ac_{2}(C_{2}O_{4})_{3}
Molar mass	718.08 g/mol
Appearance	Colorless solid (decahydrate)
Density	2.68 g/cm^{3} (decahydrate)
Solubility in water	Nearly insoluble in water

Structure
Crystal structure	Monoclinic (decahydrate)
Space group	P2_{1}/c, No. 14
Lattice constant	a = 1.126 nm, b = 0.997 nm, c = 1.065 nm α = 90°, β = 111.3°, γ = 90°
Formula units (Z)	2
- Except where otherwise noted, data are given for materials in their standard state (at 25 °C [77 °F], 100 kPa). Infobox references

Actinium(III) oxalate is a salt of actinium and oxalic acid, with the chemical formula Ac_{2}(C_{2}O_{4})_{3}. The best-characterized form is the colorless decahydrate, Ac_{2}(C_{2}O_{4})_{3}·10H_{2}O.

== Structure and properties ==
Actinium(III) oxalate decahydrate is a colorless crystalline solid. It is isomorphous with lanthanum oxalate decahydrate and crystallizes in the monoclinic crystal system. Powder diffraction measurements gave lattice parameters a = 11.26 Å, b = 9.97 Å, c = 10.65 Å and β = 111.3°, with two formula units per unit cell.

The calculated density from these crystallographic data is 2.68 g/cm^{3}.

Only limited structural information is available for actinium compounds because of the element's intense radioactivity and scarcity. Actinium oxalate decahydrate is one of the few non-halide, non-chalcogenide Ac(III) compounds for which crystallographic data have been reported.

The structure has generally been considered analogous to that of lanthanum oxalate decahydrate, with nine-coordinate Ac^{3+} centres, although the available actinium data are based on powder diffraction rather than a full single crystal structure determination.

=== Thermal decomposition ===
Actinium oxalate can be converted to actinium(III) oxide by strong heating. In radiochemical preparations, ignition of actinium oxalate at about 1000–1100 °C has been used to obtain Ac_{2}O_{3}.

== Preparation ==
Actinium(III) oxalate decahydrate can be prepared by precipitating a purified aqueous solution containing Ac^{3+} with oxalic acid:

2 Ac^{3+} + 3 H_{2}C_{2}O_{4} + 10 H_{2}O → Ac_{2}(C_{2}O_{4})_{3}·10H_{2}O↓ + 6 H^{+}

The compound is only sparingly soluble in water, which allows actinium to be precipitated as the oxalate from solution.
