= Praseodymium oxybromide =

Names
- Other names: Praseodymium oxide bromide; Praseodymium(III) oxybomide

Identifiers
3D model (JSmol)	Interactive image
- InChI: InChI=1S/BrH.O.Pr/h1H;;/q;-2;+3/p-1 Key: ATLDIDCKQNMBFR-UHFFFAOYSA-M
- SMILES: [Br-].[O-2].[Pr+3]

Properties
Chemical formula	BrOPr
Molar mass	236.811 g·mol^{−1}
Appearance	crystals
Density	6.3 g/cm^{3}

Structure
Crystal structure	tetragonal
Space group	P4/nmm

Related compounds
Related compounds	Berkelium(III) oxybromide; Californium(III) oxybromide; Plutonium oxybromide
- Except where otherwise noted, data are given for materials in their standard state (at 25 °C [77 °F], 100 kPa). Infobox references

Praseodymium oxybromide or praseodymium oxide bromide is an inorganic compound of praseodymium, oxygen, and bromine with the chemical formula PrOBr.

== Synthesis ==
PrOBr can be synthesized by decomposing praseodymium(III) bromide crystallohydrate by heating:

PrBr_{3}·xH_{2}O → PrOBr + 2HBr + (x–1)H_{2}O

== Physical properties ==
The compound forms white crystals of the tetragonal system, matlockite-type PbFCl, space group P4/nmm.
