= Marguerite Perey =

French physicist (1909–1975)

- Born: Marguerite Catherine Perey; 19 October 1909; Villemomble, Seine-Saint-Denis, France
- Died: 13 May 1975 (aged 65); Louveciennes, Yvelines, France
- Education: The Sorbonne
- Known for: Francium discovery
- Awards: Leconte Prize (1960)
- Scientific career
- Fields: Physics, chemistry, radiochemistry
- Workplaces: Curie Institute, University of Strasbourg
- Thesis: L’élément 87: Actinium K (1946)

Marguerite Catherine Perey (19 October 1909 – 13 May 1975) was a French physicist and a student of Marie Curie. In 1939, Perey discovered the element francium by purifying samples of lanthanum that contained actinium. She graduated from the Sorbonne in 1946 with a Doctorate of Physics; her thesis was about her recently discovered element 87. In 1962, she was the first woman to be elected to the French Académie des Sciences, an honor denied to her mentor Curie.

== Early life ==
Perey was born in 1909 in Villemomble, France, just outside Paris, where the Curies' Radium Institute was located. Although she hoped to study medicine, the death of her father left the family in financial difficulties.

Perey earned a chemistry diploma from Paris' Technical School of Women's Education in 1929; while not a "degree", it did qualify her to work as a chemistry technician. In 1929 at the age of 19, Perey interviewed for a role as a personal assistant (technician) to Marie Curie at Curie's Radium Institute in Paris, France, and was hired. Marie Curie took on a mentoring role to Perey, taking her on as her personal assistant.

== Early career ==
Under Marie Curie's guidance at the Radium Institute, Perey learned how to isolate and purify radioactive elements, focusing on the chemical element actinium (discovered in Curie's laboratory in 1899 by chemist André-Louis Debierne). Perey spent a decade sifting out actinium from all the other components of uranium ore, which Curie then used in her study of the decay of the element. Marie Curie died of aplastic anemia only five years after Perey began working with her, but Perey and Debierne continued their research on actinium and Perey was promoted to radiochemist.

== Discovery of francium ==
In 1935, Perey read a paper by American scientists claiming to have discovered a type of radiation called beta particles being emitted by actinium and was skeptical because the reported energy of the beta particles didn't seem to match actinium. She decided to investigate for herself, theorizing that actinium was decaying into another element (a daughter atom) and that the observed beta particles were actually coming from that daughter atom. She confirmed this by isolating extremely pure actinium and studying its radiation very quickly; she detected a small amount of alpha radiation, a type of radiation that involves the loss of protons and therefore changes an atom's identity. Loss of an alpha particle (consisting of 2 protons and 2 neutrons) would turn actinium (element 89, with 89 protons) into the theorized but never-before-seen element 87.

Perey announced the discovery of the never-before-seen element 87 as a note in the Comptes Rendus presented at the Académie des Sciences by Jean Baptiste Perrin on 9 January 1939 with the title "On an element 87, derived from actinium." Perey's discovery was announced by Perrin, not Perey herself, because she was only a laboratory assistant with no university degree. Perey named the element francium, after her home country, and it joined the other alkali metals in Group 1 of the periodic table of elements. Francium is the second rarest element (after astatine) — only about 550g exists in the entire Earth's crust at any given time — and it was the last element to be discovered in nature. (Five elements that were discovered synthetically were later found to exist in nature: technetium, promethium, astatine, neptunium, and plutonium.)

Perey received a grant to study at Paris' Sorbonne, but because she didn't have a bachelor's degree, the Sorbonne required her to take courses and obtain the equivalent of a B.S. to fulfill their PhD program requirements before she could earn her doctorate. She graduated from the Sorbonne in 1946 with a Doctorate of Physics. Her thesis was about her recently discovered element 87. Her jury committee included André-Louis Debierne, Irène Joliot-Curie, and the biologist Pierre-Paul Grassé. Joliot-Curie commented during Perey's defense that her "mother [Marie Curie] would have been happy."

== Later career ==
After obtaining her PhD, Perey returned to the Radium Institute as a senior scientist and worked there until 1949.

Perey was made the head of the department of nuclear chemistry at the University of Strasbourg in 1949, where she developed the university's radiochemistry and nuclear chemistry program and continued her work on francium. She founded a laboratory that in 1958 became the Laboratory of Nuclear Chemistry in the Center for Nuclear Research, for which she served as director. She also served as a member of the Atomic Weights Commission from 1950 to 1963.

Because of her work with francium, Perey was nominated five times for a Nobel Prize, but she never received it.

Perey hoped that francium would help diagnose cancer, but in fact it itself was carcinogenic, and Perey developed bone cancer which eventually killed her. Perey died on 13 May 1975 (age 65). She is credited with championing better safety measures for scientists working with radiation.

== Honours and awards ==
Perey was elected to the French Academy of Sciences in 1962, making her the first woman elected to the Institut de France. Although a significant step, her election as a "corresponding member" rather than a full member came with limited privileges.

- The French Academy of Science Wilde Prize (1950)
- The French Academy of Science Le Conte Prize (1960)
- The City of Paris Science Grand Prize (1960)
- Officier of the Légion d'Honneur (1960)
- Grand Prix de la Ville de Paris (1960)
- Elected correspondante of the Académie des Sciences (Paris, 1962). First woman to be elected to the Académie since its founding in 1666.
- Lavoisier Prize of the Académie des Sciences (1964)
- Silver Medal of the Société Chimique de France (1964)
- Commandeur of the Ordre National du Mérite (1974)

In 2026, Perey was announced as one of 72 historical women in STEM whose names have been proposed to be added to the 72 men already celebrated on the Eiffel Tower. The plan was announced by the Mayor of Paris, Anne Hidalgo following the recommendations of a committee led by Isabelle Vauglin of Femmes et Sciences and Jean-François Martins, representing the operating company which runs the Eiffel Tower.

== Archives ==
Perey's archives with materials dating from 1929 to 1975 are housed at the University of Strasbourg. They include laboratory notebooks, course materials from her work as professor of nuclear chemistry, papers from her laboratory directorship, and publications. All documents are currently held at the Archives départementales du Bas-Rhin (Departmental archives of the Bas-Rhin).

== Selected publications ==
- "Sur un élément 87, dérivé de l'actinium," Comptes-rendus hebdomadaires des séances de l'Académie des sciences, 208: 97 (1939).
- L’élément 87
- Sur les rayonnements β et γ de l'actinium et de l'actinium K
- "Francium: élément 87," Bulletin de la Société chimique de France, 18: 779 (1951).
- "Sur la descendance de l'actinium k: 22387Fr," Journal de Physique et le Radium, 17: 545 (1956).

== See also ==
- List of women associated with Marie Curie and Irène Joliot-Curie
- Timeline of women in science
