= Actinium(III) oxybromide =

Actinium oxybromide
Names
- Other names: Actinium oxide bromide; Actinium(III) oxybomide

Identifiers
CAS Number	49848-33-1
3D model (JSmol)	Interactive image
- InChI: InChI=1S/Ac.BrH.O/h;1H;/q+3;;-2/p-1 Key: XKRRFPCSEZCCLJ-UHFFFAOYSA-M
- SMILES: [Ac+3].[Br-].[O-2]

Properties
Chemical formula	AcOBr
Molar mass	323 g/mol
Appearance	white crystals
Density	7.89 g/cm^{3}

Structure
Crystal structure	tetragonal
Space group	P4/nmm

Related compounds
Related compounds	Berkelium(III) oxybromide; Californium(III) oxybromide; Plutonium oxybromide; Erbium oxybromide
- Except where otherwise noted, data are given for materials in their standard state (at 25 °C [77 °F], 100 kPa). Infobox references

Actinium oxybromide is an inorganic compound of actinium, oxygen, and bromine with the chemical formula AcOBr.

== Synthesis ==
AcOBr can be synthesized by reacting AcBr_{3} with a mixture of NH_{3} and H_{2}O at 500 °C.

AcBr_{3} + 2NH_{3} + H_{2}O → AcOBr + 2NH_{4}Br

== Physical properties ==
The compound forms white crystals of tetragonal system, space group P4/nmm.
