= Berkelium(III) oxybromide =

Names
- Other names: Berkelium oxybromide; Berkelium bromide oxide

Identifiers
| CAS Number | 22787-72-0 |
| 3D model (JSmol) | Interactive image |
- InChI: InChI=1S/Bk.BrH.O/h;1H;/q+3;;-2/p-1 Key: SYNKSMNZTRRGKM-UHFFFAOYSA-M
- SMILES: [Bk+3].[Br-].[O-2]

Properties
| Chemical formula | BkBrO |
| Molar mass | 343 g·mol^{−1} |

Related compounds
| Related compounds | Einsteinium oxybromide Californium oxybromide Plutonium oxybromide |
- Except where otherwise noted, data are given for materials in their standard state (at 25 °C [77 °F], 100 kPa). Infobox references

Berkelium(III) oxybromide is an inorganic compound of berkelium, bromine, and oxygen with the chemical formula BkOBr.

== Synthesis ==
Berkelium oxybromide can be prepared by the action of a vapor mixture of HBr and H_{2}O on berkelium tribromide.
