= Californium(III) oxybromide =

Names
- Other names Californium oxybromide

Identifiers
CAS Number	20758-82-1; 30338-10-4 (^{249}Cf)
3D model (JSmol)	Interactive image
- InChI: InChI=1S/BrH.Cf.O/h1H;;/q;+3;-2/p-1 Key: GRLGSZZUZXNWOT-UHFFFAOYSA-M
- SMILES: [Br-].[Cf+3].[O-2]

Properties
Chemical formula	CfOBr
Molar mass	347 g/mol

Structure
Crystal structure	tetragonal

Related compounds
Related compounds	Berkelium oxybromide; Plutonium oxybromide; Actinium oxybromide; Erbium oxybromide
- Except where otherwise noted, data are given for materials in their standard state (at 25 °C [77 °F], 100 kPa). Infobox references

Californium(III) oxybromide is an inorganic compound of californium, bromine, and oxygen with the formula CfOBr. It is obtained by heating Cf_{2}O_{3} in HBr. The compound is isostructural with CfOCl. Both are prepared by the same method.
