= Actinium oxyfluoride =

Identifiers
CAS Number	49848-24-0
3D model (JSmol)	Interactive image
- InChI: InChI=1S/Ac.FH.O/h;1H;/q+3;;-2/p-1 Key: LHOIFNAUSIZYHZ-UHFFFAOYSA-M
- SMILES: [Ac+3].[F-].[O-2]

Properties
Chemical formula	AcOF
Molar mass	262.03 g·mol^{−1}
Appearance	solid
Density	8.280 g·cm^{−1}

Structure
Crystal structure	cubic
Lattice constant	a = 0.5931 nm
- Except where otherwise noted, data are given for materials in their standard state (at 25 °C [77 °F], 100 kPa). Infobox references

Actinium oxyfluoride is an inorganic compound, with the chemical formula AcOF. It is radioactive. It crystallises in a calcium fluoride structure. It can be obtained by reacting actinium fluoride with ammonia and water:

AcF_{3} + 2 NH_{3} + H_{2}O → AcOF + 2 NH_{4}F (Note: Ammonium fluoride decomposes into NH_{3} and HF at high temperature and recombines at low temperature)

The reaction proceeds completely at 1200 °C, and unreacted AcF_{3} will remain at lower temperatures.
