= Berkelium(III) bromide =

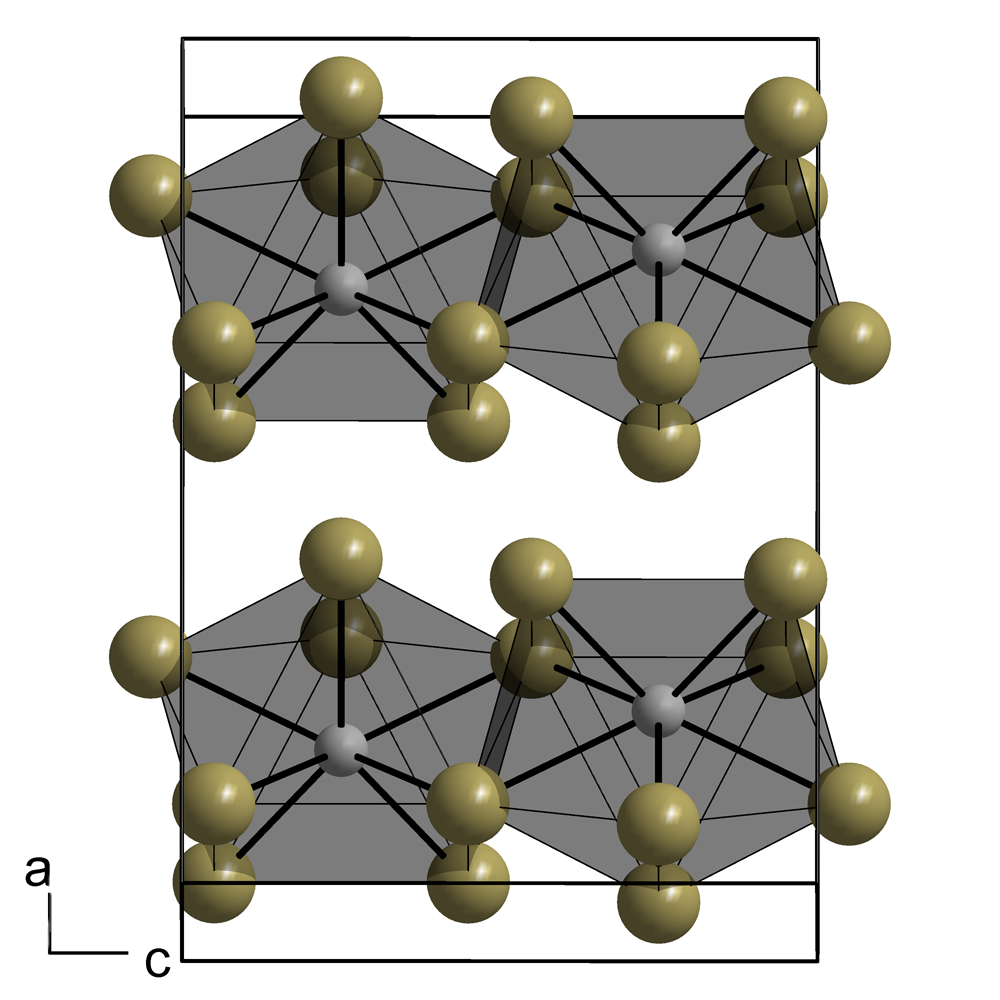

Identifiers
CAS Number	22787-71-9
3D model (JSmol)	Interactive image
ChemSpider	28548253
- InChI: InChI=1S/Bk.3BrH/h;3*1H/q+3;;;/p-3 Key: QXVXDBUNYGKXIG-UHFFFAOYSA-K
- SMILES: [Br-].[Br-].[Br-].[Bk+3]

Properties
Chemical formula	BkBr_{3}
Molar mass	487 g·mol^{−1}
Appearance	yellow-green crystals

Related compounds
Other anions	Berkelium fluoride Berkelilum chloride Berkelium iodide
Other cations	Curium bromide Californium bromide
- Except where otherwise noted, data are given for materials in their standard state (at 25 °C [77 °F], 100 kPa). Infobox references

Berkelium bromide is a bromide of berkelium, with the chemical formula BkBr_{3}.

== Structure ==
Berkelium bromide has a PuBr_{3} structure at low temperature and is in the orthorhombic crystal system, with lattice parameters a = 403 pm, b = 1271 pm and c = 912 pm. At high temperature, berkelium bromide has an AlCl_{3} structure and a monoclinic crystal system with lattice parameters a = 723 pm, b = 1253 pm, c = 683 pm and β = 110.6°.

== External reading ==
- Hobart, David E.; Peterson, Joseph R. (2006), "Berkelium", in Morss, Lester R.; Edelstein, Norman M.; Fuger, Jean (eds.), The Chemistry of the Actinide and Transactinide Elements, Dordrecht: Springer Netherlands, pp. 1444–1498, doi:10.1007/1-4020-3598-5_10, ISBN 978-1-4020-3555-5
