= Actinium(III) sulfide =

Names
- Other names Diactinium trisulfide

Identifiers
CAS Number	50647-18-2
3D model (JSmol)	Interactive image
- InChI: InChI=1S/2Ac.3S/q2*+3;3*-2 Key: FBGRPVYTNBFOJK-UHFFFAOYSA-N
- SMILES: [S-2].[S-2].[S-2].[Ac+3].[Ac+3]

Properties
Chemical formula	Ac_{2}S_{3}
Molar mass	550.254 g/mol
Density	6.75 g/cm^{3}

Structure
Crystal structure	Cubic, cl28

Related compounds
Other anions	Actinium(III) oxide
Other cations	Lanthanum(III) sulfide
- Except where otherwise noted, data are given for materials in their standard state (at 25 °C [77 °F], 100 kPa). Infobox references

Actinium(III) sulfide is the radioactive compound of actinium with the formula Ac_{2}S_{3}. This salt was prepared by heating actinium(III) oxalate at 1400°C for 6 minutes in a mixture of carbon disulfide and hydrogen sulfide. The result was conformed to be actinium(III) sulfide by x-ray diffraction.
