= Friedrich Oskar Giesel =

German organic chemist (1852–1927)

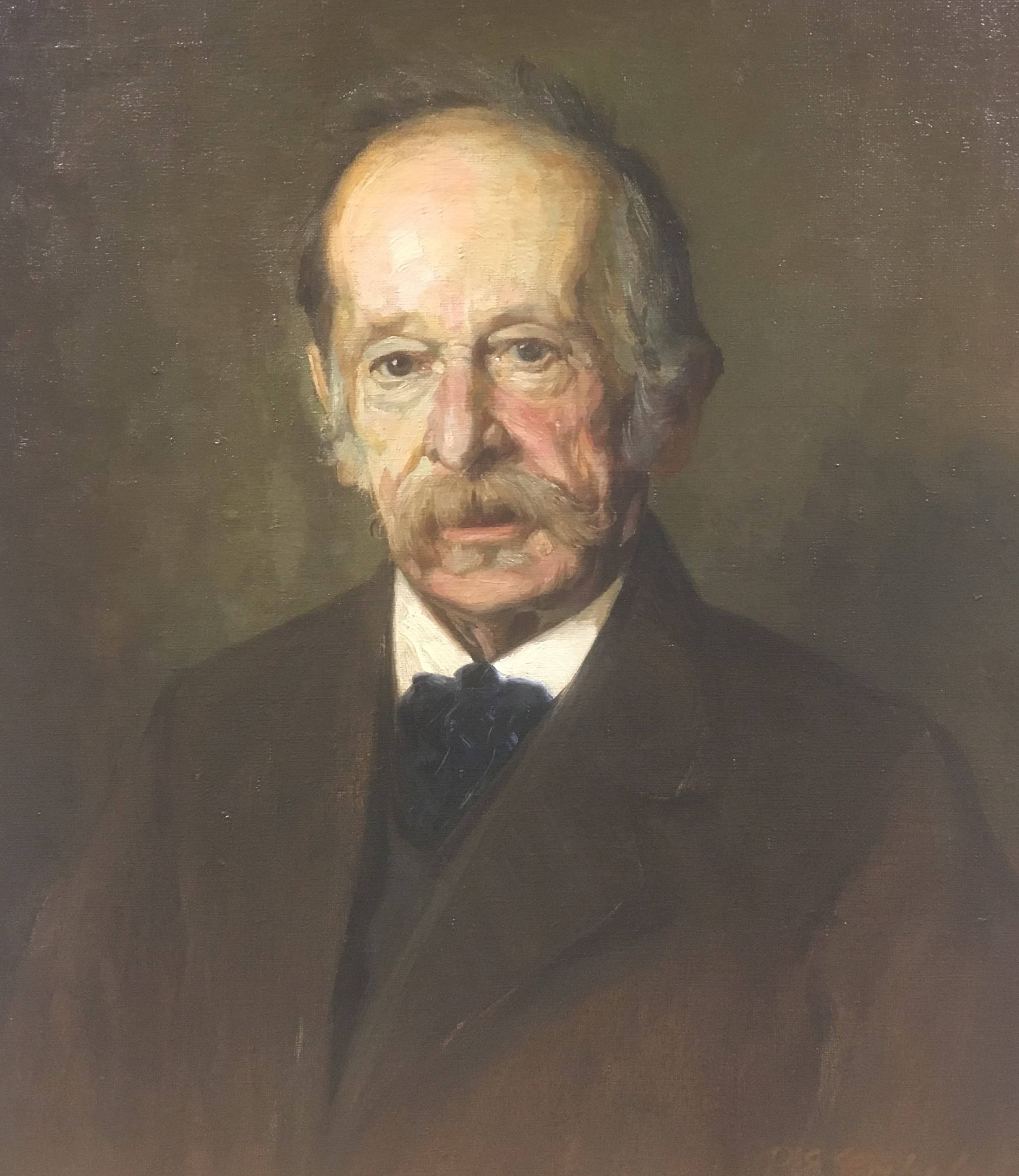
- Born: 20 May 1852; Winzig, Germany
- Died: 13 November 1927 (aged 75); Braunschweig Germany
- Known for: discovery of actinium
- Scientific career
- Fields: radiochemistry

Friedrich Oskar Giesel (20 May 1852 – 13 November 1927, known as Fritz) was a German organic chemist. During his work in a quinine factory in the late 1890s, he began work in the then-novel field of radiochemistry and started the production of radium. In the period between 1902 and 1904, he was able to isolate a new element emanium. In a now controversially reviewed process, it was stated that emanium is identical to actinium, which was discovered by André-Louis Debierne in 1899.

== Life and work ==
After studying in Berlin with Carl Liebermann, he received his Ph.D at the University of Göttingen. Giesel worked at the Chininfabrik Braunschweig. Besides his work in the factory, Giesel's focus was on radiochemistry. Shortly after publication of the discovery of polonium in the summer of 1898, he started to isolate the new element from the waste of uranium production in the chemical plant E. de Haën in Hanover. By March 1899 he could present the first radium to the chemical society of Braunschweig and by mid-1899 he published his results on radium. Giesel improved the separation of radium from barium by using the bromides instead of the chlorides for the fractional crystallization. He produced large quantities of pure radium and polonium for commercial applications from uranium ore. Even William Ramsay and Frederick Soddy were buying radium from the factory of Giesel.

What I have since dubbed the Isenthal 'manna' was in fact the first consignment of pure radium compounds that Giesel of the Chinin Fabrik of Brunswick was putting on the market and the price I paid for it was about eight shillings a milligram of radium bromide (50 per cent pure radium).

— Frederick Soddy

The use of Sidot's blende (zinc sulfide) instead of barium platinocyanide as a luminescence material to make the radioactive rays visible was a commonly accepted improvement. He did several self-experiments with radioactive substances and was able to affirm the damaging effects of radioactive radiation on skin. Because of prolonged contact with radioactive material, fingers of his right hand had to be amputated and he suffered from lung cancer. He died of lung cancer in 1927. His name was included on the Monument to the X-ray and Radium Martyrs of All Nations erected in Hamburg, Germany in 1936.

=== The discovery of emanium ===
Giesel isolated from pitchblende a lanthanum-containing fraction which showed unique properties. He produced several compounds of the new element, and after studying for two years he was confident enough to give the new element the name emanium. He was aware of the discovery of actinium by André-Louis Debierne. In publications from 1899 and 1900 Debierne does not give the exact procedures to obtain actinium, but from the description of chemical properties which he described as similar to titanium (1899) or similar to thorium (1900) it was clear for Giesel that the two elements must be different. A later comparison of the two elements by Otto Hahn, Otto Sackur and others showed that the two elements were identical. Debierne's name was retained because it had seniority.

Giesel stated in one of his publications that the sample Debierne provided for the comparison was a lanthanum fraction obtained by the same process he used and not the titanium or thorium fractions from earlier publications. This fact never led to an open controversy but the history of the discovery stayed questionable, and publications from 1971 argue that the claims of André-Louis Debierne in 1904 conflict with the publications in 1899 and 1900, making Giesel the real discoverer of actinium.

A less confrontational vision of scientific discovery is proposed by Adloff. He suggests that hindsight criticism of the early publications should be mitigated by the nascent state of radiochemistry, highlights the prudence of Debierne's claims in the original papers, and notes that nobody can contend that Debierne's substance did not contain actinium. Debierne, who is now considered by the vast majority of historians as the discoverer, lost interest in the element and left the topic. Giesel, on the other hand, can rightfully be credited with the first preparation of radiochemically pure actinium and with the identification of its atomic number 89.

== See also ==
- Schneider, Theodor (1964). "Giesel, Friedrich". Neue Deutsche Biographie (in German). Vol. 6. Berlin: Duncker & Humblot. pp. 387–387.
