= Cerium compounds =

Chemical compounds

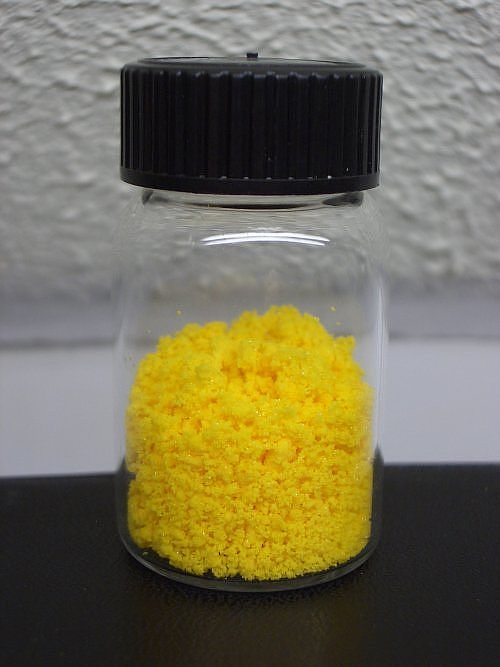
Cerium(IV) sulfate, a compound with cerium in the oxidation state +4

Cerium compounds are compounds containing the element cerium (Ce), a lanthanide. Cerium exists in two main oxidation states, Ce(III) and Ce(IV). This pair of adjacent oxidation states dominates several aspects of the chemistry of this element. Cerium(IV) aqueous solutions may be prepared by reacting cerium(III) solutions with the strong oxidizing agents peroxodisulfate or bismuthate. The value of E^{⦵}(Ce^{4+}/Ce^{3+}) varies widely depending on conditions due to the relative ease of complexation and hydrolysis with various anions, although +1.72 V is representative. Cerium is the only lanthanide which has important aqueous and coordination chemistry in the +4 oxidation state.

== Binary compounds ==
=== Halides ===
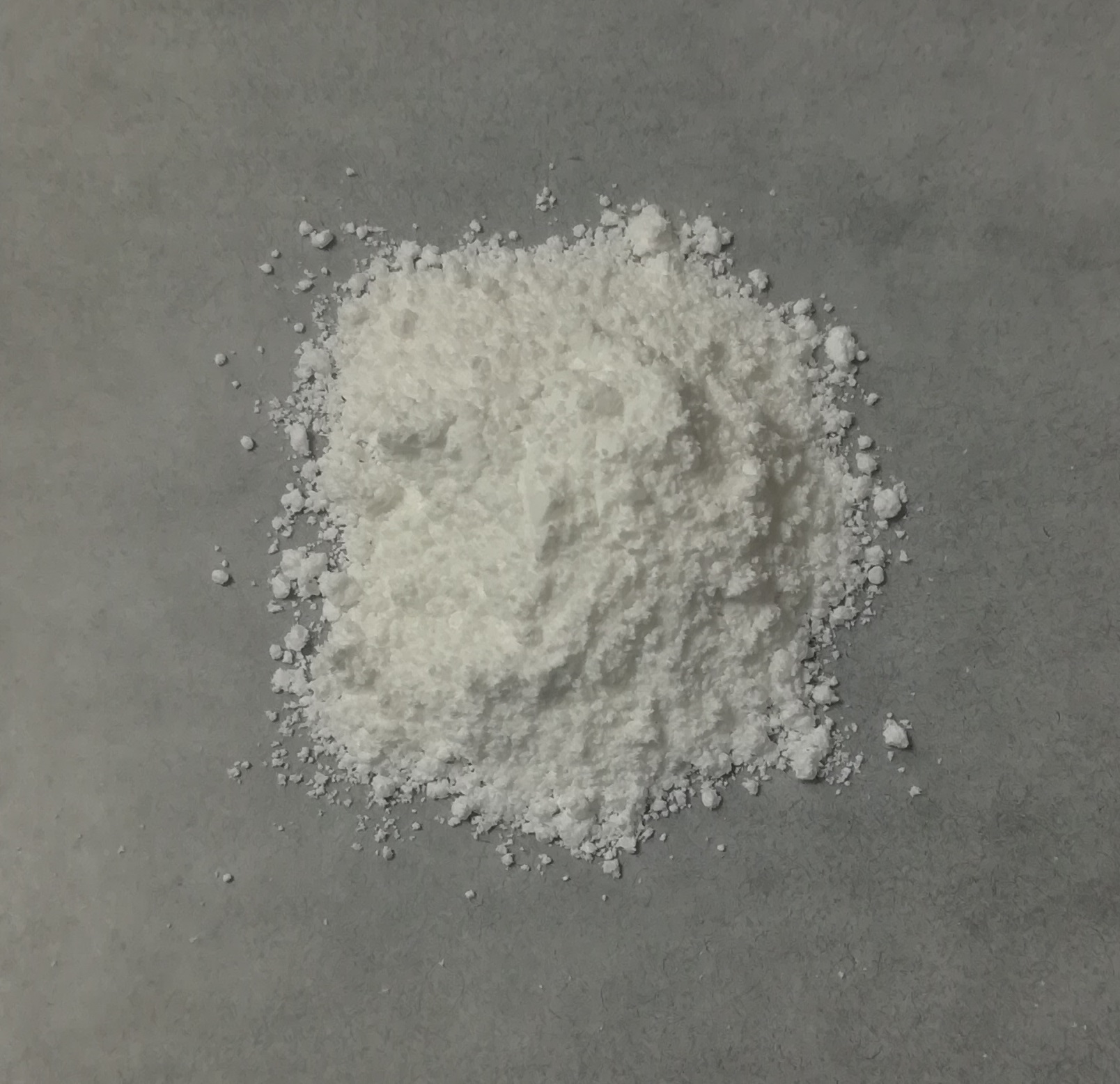
Cerium(III) fluoride

Cerium forms all four trihalides CeX_{3} (X = F, Cl, Br, I) usually by reaction of the oxides with the hydrogen halides. The anhydrous halides are pale-colored, paramagnetic, hygroscopic solids. Upon hydration, the trihalides convert to complexes containing aquo complexes [Ce(H_{2}O)_{8−9}]^{3+}. Unlike most lanthanides, Ce forms a tetrafluoride, a white solid. It also forms a bronze-colored diiodide, which has metallic properties.

Aside from the binary halide phases, a number of anionic halide complexes are known. Fluoride gives the Ce(IV) derivatives CeF_{8}^{4−} and CeF_{6}^{2−}. Chloride gives the orange CeCl_{6}^{2−}.

=== Oxides and chalcogenides ===
Cerium(IV) oxide ("ceria") has the fluorite structure, similarly to the dioxides of praseodymium and terbium. Ceria is a nonstoichiometric compound, meaning that the real formula is CeO_{2−x}, where x is about 0.2. Thus, the material is not perfectly described as Ce(IV). Ceria reduces to cerium(III) oxide with hydrogen gas.

Many nonstoichiometric chalcogenides are also known, along with the trivalent Ce_{2}Z_{3} (Z = S, Se, Te). The monochalcogenides CeZ conduct electricity and would better be formulated as Ce^{3+}Z^{2−}e^{−}. While CeZ_{2} compounds are known, they are polychalcogenides with cerium(III): cerium(IV) derivatives of S, Se, and Te are unknown.

=== Other binary compounds ===
Cerium phosphide is a gray crystal, which can be obtained by reacting cerium dioxide and phosphine at 1300 °C in the presence of hydrogen, or by reacting sodium phosphide and cerium chloride at 700~800 °C.

== Cerium(IV) complexes ==
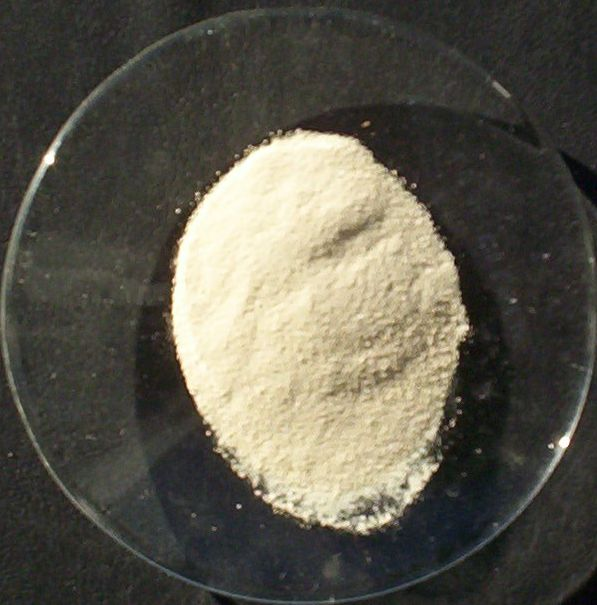
Cerium(IV) oxide

The compound ceric ammonium nitrate ("CAN") (NH_{4})_{2}[Ce(NO_{3})_{6}] is the most common cerium compound encountered in the laboratory. The six nitrate ligands bind as bidentate ligands. The complex [Ce(NO_{3})_{6}]^{2−} is 12-coordinate, a high coordination number which emphasizes the large size of the Ce^{4+} ion. CAN is popular oxidant in organic synthesis, both as a stoichiometric reagent and as a catalyst. It is inexpensive, easily handled. It operates by one-electron redox. Cerium nitrates also form 4:3 and 1:1 complexes with 18-crown-6 (the ratio referring to that between cerium and the crown ether).

Classically CAN is a primary standard for quantitative analysis. Cerium(IV) salts, especially cerium(IV) sulfate, are often used as standard reagents for volumetric analysis in cerimetric titrations.

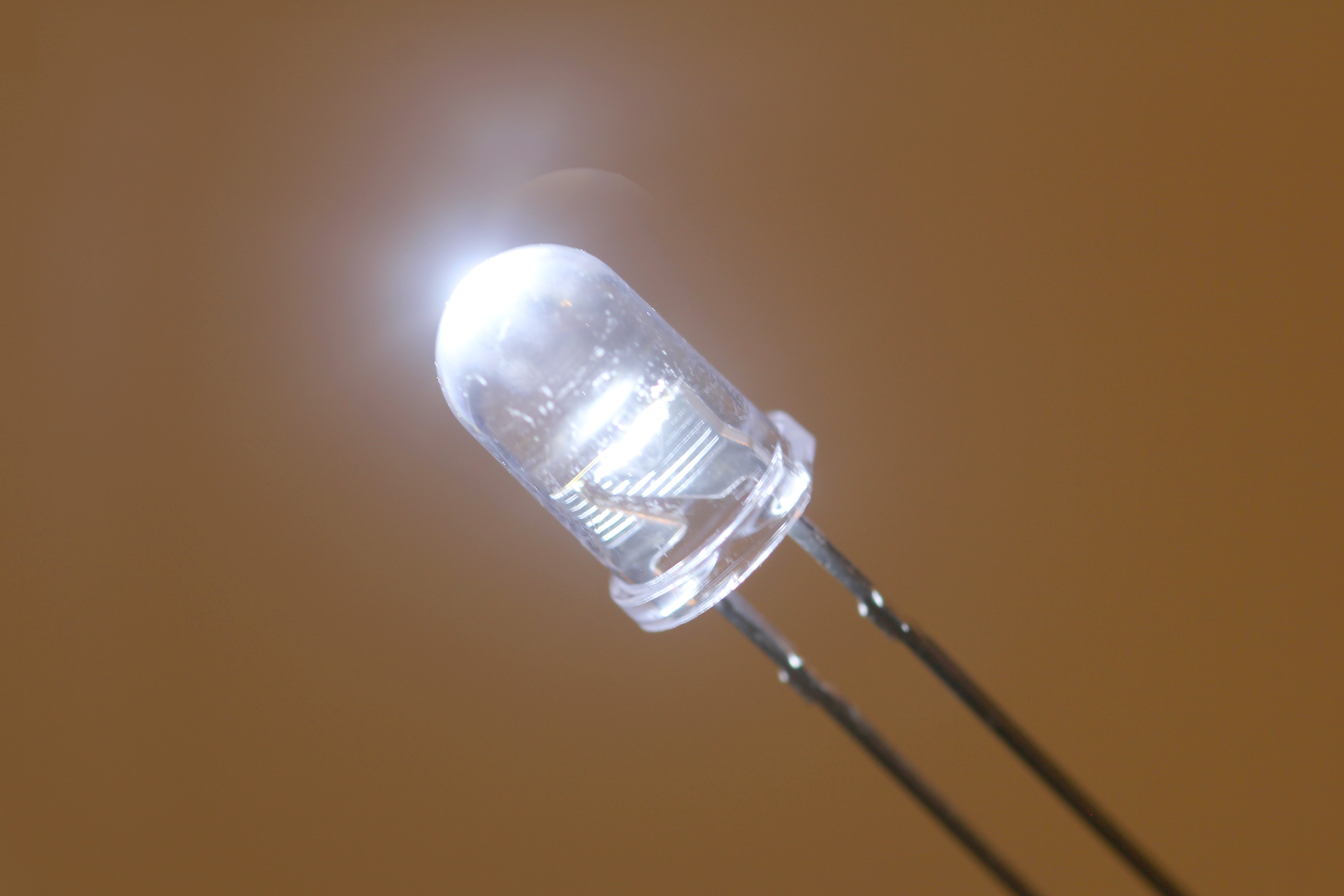
A white LED in operation: the diode produces monochromatic blue light but the Ce:YAG phosphor converts some of it into yellow light, with the combination perceived as white by the eye.

Cerium(III) and terbium(III) have ultraviolet absorption bands of relatively high intensity compared with the other lanthanides, as their configurations (one electron more than an empty or half-filled f-subshell respectively) make it easier for the extra f electron to undergo f→d transitions instead of the forbidden f→f transitions of the other lanthanides. Cerium(III) sulfate is one of the few salts whose solubility in water decreases with rising temperature.

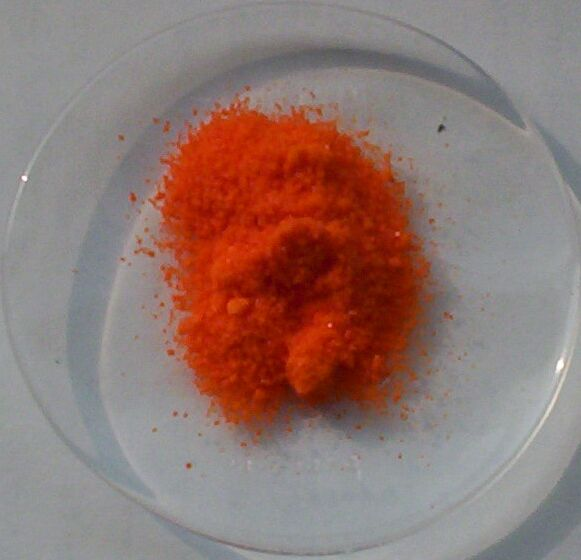
Ceric ammonium nitrate

Due to ligand-to-metal charge transfer, aqueous cerium(IV) ions are orange-yellow. Aqueous cerium(IV) is metastable in water and is a strong oxidizing agent that oxidizes hydrochloric acid to give chlorine gas.

In the Belousov–Zhabotinsky reaction, cerium oscillates between the +4 and +3 oxidation states to catalyze the reaction.

== Organocerium compounds ==
Organocerium chemistry is similar to that of the other lanthanides, often involving complexes of cyclopentadienyl and cyclooctatetraenyl ligands. Cerocene (Ce(C_{8}H_{8})_{2}) adopts the uranocene molecular structure. The 4f electron in cerocene, Ce(C_{8}H_{8})_{2}, is poised ambiguously between being localized and delocalized and this compound is also considered intermediate-valent. Alkyl, alkynyl, and alkenyl organocerium derivatives are prepared from the transmetallation of the respective organolithium or Grignard reagents, and are more nucleophilic but less basic than their precursors.

== See also ==
- Praseodymium compounds
- Terbium compounds
- Thorium compounds
