= Thorium compounds =

Chemical compounds

Reactions of thorium metal

Many compounds of thorium are known: this is because thorium and uranium are the most stable and accessible actinides and are the only actinides that can be studied safely and legally in bulk in a normal laboratory. As such, they have the best-known chemistry of the actinides, along with that of plutonium, as the self-heating and radiation from them is not enough to cause radiolysis of chemical bonds as it is for the other actinides. While the later actinides from americium onwards are predominantly trivalent and behave more similarly to the corresponding lanthanides, as one would expect from periodic trends, the early actinides up to plutonium (thus including thorium and uranium) have relativistically destabilised and hence delocalised 5f and 6d electrons that participate in chemistry in a similar way to the early transition metals of group 3 through 8: thus, all their valence electrons can participate in chemical reactions, although this is not common for neptunium and plutonium.

== General chemistry ==
A thorium atom has 90 electrons, of which four are valence electrons. Four atomic orbitals are theoretically available for the valence electrons to occupy: 5f, 6d, 7s, and 7p. However, the 7p orbital is greatly destabilised and hence it is not occupied in the ground state of any thorium ion. Despite thorium's position in the f-block of the periodic table, it has an anomalous [Rn]6d^{2}7s^{2} electron configuration in the ground state, as the 5f and 6d subshells in the early actinides are very close in energy, even more so than the 4f and 5d subshells of the lanthanides. However, in metallic thorium, the [Rn]5f^{1}6d^{1}7s^{2} configuration is a low-lying excited state and hence the 5f orbitals contribute, existing in a rather broad energy band. In fact, the 5f subshells of the actinides have a larger spatial extent than the 4f orbitals of the lanthanides and thus actinide compounds have greater covalent character than the corresponding lanthanide compounds, leading to a more extensive coordination chemistry for the actinides than the lanthanides.

The ground-state electron configurations of thorium ions are as follows: Th^{+}, [Rn]6d^{2}7s^{1}; Th^{2+}, [Rn]5f^{1}6d^{1}; (Note: [Rn]6d^{2} is a very low-lying excited state configuration of Th^{2+}.) Th^{3+}, [Rn]5f^{1}; Th^{4+}, [Rn]. This shows the increasing stabilisation of the 5f orbital as ion charge increases; however, this stabilisation is insufficient to chemically stabilise Th^{3+} with its lone 5f valence electron, and therefore the stable and most common form of thorium in chemicals is Th^{4+} with all four valence electrons lost, leaving behind an inert core of inner electrons with the electron configuration of the noble gas radon. The first ionisation potential of thorium was measured to be (6.08 ± 0.12) eV in 1974; more recent measurements have refined this to 6.3067 eV.

Thorium is a highly reactive and electropositive metal. At standard temperature and pressure, it is slowly attacked by water, but does not readily dissolve in most common acids, with the exception of hydrochloric acid. It dissolves in concentrated nitric acid containing a small amount of catalytic fluoride or fluorosilicate ions; if these are not present, passivation can occur, similarly to uranium and plutonium. At high temperatures, it is easily attacked by oxygen, hydrogen, nitrogen, the halogens, and sulfur. It can also form binary compounds with carbon and phosphorus. When thorium dissolves in hydrochloric acid, a black insoluble residue, probably ThO(OH, Cl)H is left behind, similarly to protactinium and uranium.

Finely divided thorium metal presents a fire hazard due to its pyrophoricity and must therefore be handled carefully. When heated in air, thorium turnings ignite and burn brilliantly with a white light to produce the dioxide. In bulk, the reaction of pure thorium with air is slow, although corrosion may eventually occur after several months; most thorium samples are however contaminated with varying degrees of the dioxide, which greatly accelerates corrosion. Such samples slowly tarnish in air, becoming grey and finally black at the surface. The impermeability of the oxide layer of thorium contrasts with that of the later actinides and conforms to the trend of increasing electropositivity and reactivity as the actinide series is traversed.

The most important oxidation state of thorium is +4, represented in compounds such as thorium dioxide (ThO_{2}) and thorium tetrafluoride (ThF_{4}), although some compounds are known with thorium in lower formal oxidation states. Owing to thorium(IV)'s lack of electrons in 6d and 5f orbitals, the tetravalent thorium compounds are colourless. Th^{3+} compounds are uncommon due to the large negative reduction potential of the Th^{4+}/Th^{3+} couple. In 1997, reports of amber Th^{3+} (aq) being generated from thorium tetrachloride and ammonia were published: the ion was supposedly stable for about an hour before it was oxidised by water. However, the reaction was shown the next year to be thermodynamically impossible and the more likely explanation for the signals was azido-chloro complexes of thorium(IV). In fact, the redox potentials of thorium, protactinium, and uranium are much more similar to those of the d-block transition metals than the lanthanides, reflecting their historic placement prior to the 1940s as the heaviest members of groups 4, 5, and 6 in the periodic table respectively.

In aqueous solution, thorium occurs exclusively as the tetrapositive aqua ion [Th(H_{2}O)_{9}]^{4+}, which has tricapped trigonal prismatic molecular geometry: at pH < 3, the solutions of thorium salts are dominated by this cation. The Th–O bond distance is (245 ± 1) pm, the coordination number of Th^{4+} is (10.8 ± 0.5), the effective charge is 3.82 and the second coordination sphere contains 13.4 water molecules. The Th^{4+} ion is relatively large and is the largest of the tetrapositive actinide ions, and depending on the coordination number can have a radius between 0.95 and 1.14 Å. The thorium(IV) hydrated ion is quite acidic due to its high charge, slightly stronger than sulfurous acid: thus it tends to undergo hydrolysis and polymerisation, predominantly to [Th_{2}(OH)_{2}]^{6+} in solutions with pH 3 or below, but in more alkaline solution polymerisation continues until the gelatinous hydroxide is formed and precipitates out (though equilibrium may take weeks to be reached, because the polymerisation usually slows down significantly just before the precipitation): this behaviour is similar to that of plutonium(IV).

Large coordination numbers are the rule: thorium nitrate pentahydrate was the first known example of coordination number 11, the oxalate tetrahydrate has coordination number 10, and the Th(NO_{3})^{−}_{6} anion in the calcium and magnesium salts is 12-coordinate. Due to the large size of the Th^{4+} cation, thorium salts have a weaker tendency to hydrolyse than that of many multiply charged ions such as Fe^{3+}, but hydrolysis happens more readily at pH above 4, forming various polymers of unknown nature, culminating in the formation of the gelatinous hydroxide: this behaviour is similar to that of protactinium, which also hydrolyses readily in water to form colloidal precipitates. The distinctive ability of thorium salts is their high solubility, not only in water, but also in polar organic solvents. As a hard Lewis acid, Th^{4+} favours hard ligands with oxygen atoms as donors: complexes with sulfur atoms as donors are less stable.

The standard reduction potentials in acidic aqueous solution for some common thorium ions are given below:

Th^{4+} + e^{−}	⇌ Th^{3+}	E^{0} = −3.8 V
Th^{4+} + 4e^{−}	⇌ Th	E^{0} = −1.83 V

== Oxides and hydroxides ==
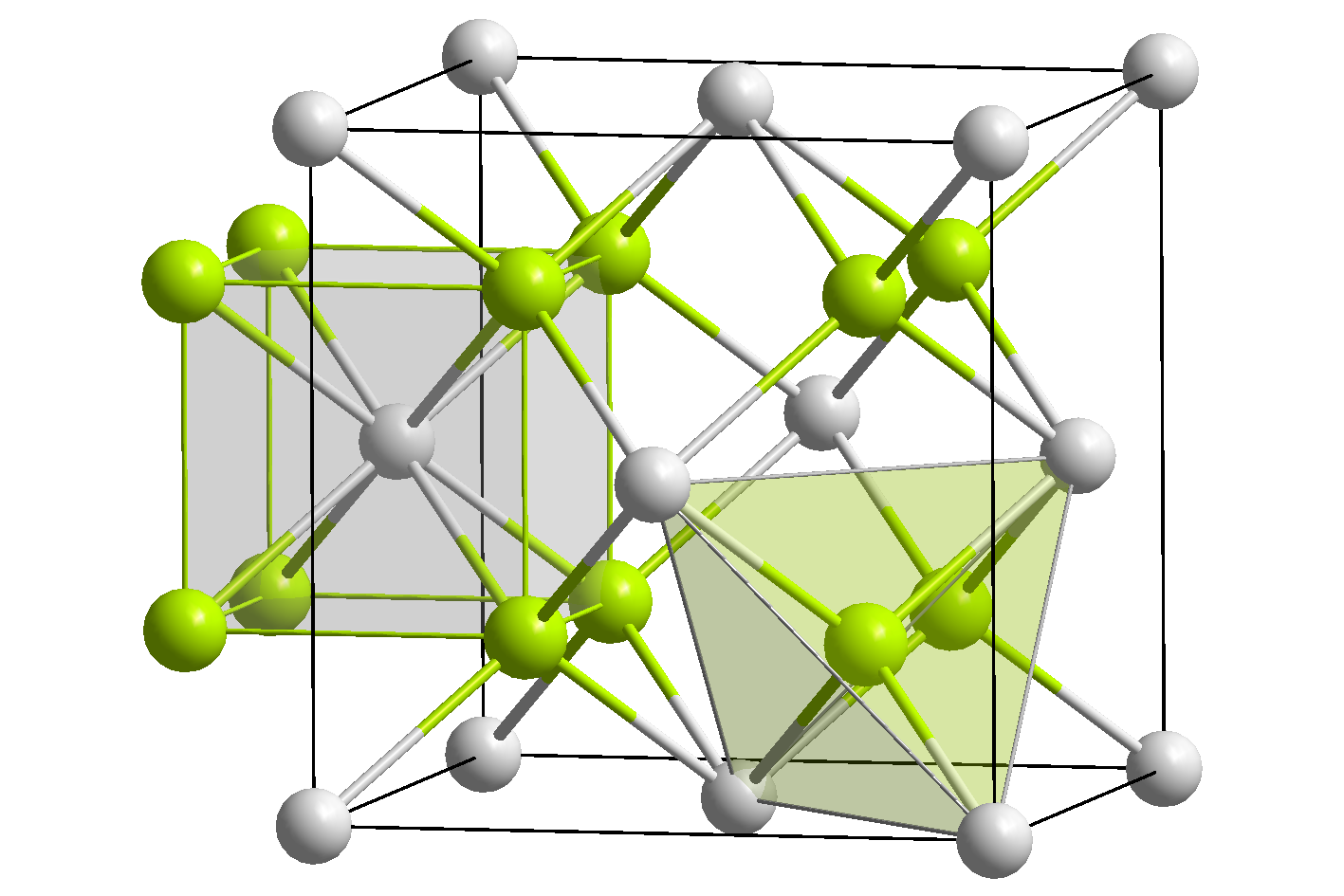
Thorium dioxide has the fluorite structure. Th^{4+}: __ / O^{2−}: __

In air, thorium burns to form the binary oxide thorium dioxide, ThO_{2}, also called thoria or thorina. Thoria, a refractory material, has the highest melting point (3390 °C) of all known oxides. It is somewhat hygroscopic and reacts readily with water and many gases, but dissolves easily in concentrated nitric acid in the presence of fluoride, like neptunium dioxide and plutonium dioxide do. When heated, it emits intense blue light, which becomes white when mixed with its lighter homologue cerium dioxide (CeO_{2}, ceria): this is the basis for its previously common application in gas mantles.

Reports of thorium peroxide, initially supposed to be Th_{2}O_{7} and be formed from reacting thorium salts with hydrogen peroxide, were later discovered to contain both peroxide anions and the anions of the reacting thorium salt. The mixed hydroxide-hydroperoxide Th(OH)_{3}OOH has been prepared. It decomposes at 120 °C to yield thorium dioxide and water.

Thorium monoxide has been produced through laser ablation of thorium in the presence of oxygen. This highly polar molecule is calculated to have one of the largest known internal electric fields.

Thorium hydroxide, Th(OH)_{4}, can be prepared by adding a hydroxide of ammonium or an alkali metal to a thorium salt solution, where it appears as a gelatinous precipitate that will dissolve in dilute acids, among other substances. It can also be prepared by electrolysis of thorium nitrates. It is stable from 260 to 450 °C; at 470 °C and above it continuously decomposes to become thoria. It easily absorbs atmospheric carbon dioxide to form the hydrated carbonate ThOCO_{3}·xH_{2}O and, under high-pressure conditions in a carbon dioxide atmosphere, Th(CO_{3})_{2}·½H_{2}O or Th(OH)_{2}CO_{3}·2H_{2}O. Several mixed oxides are known, such as BaThO_{3}, which has the perovskite structure.

== Halides ==
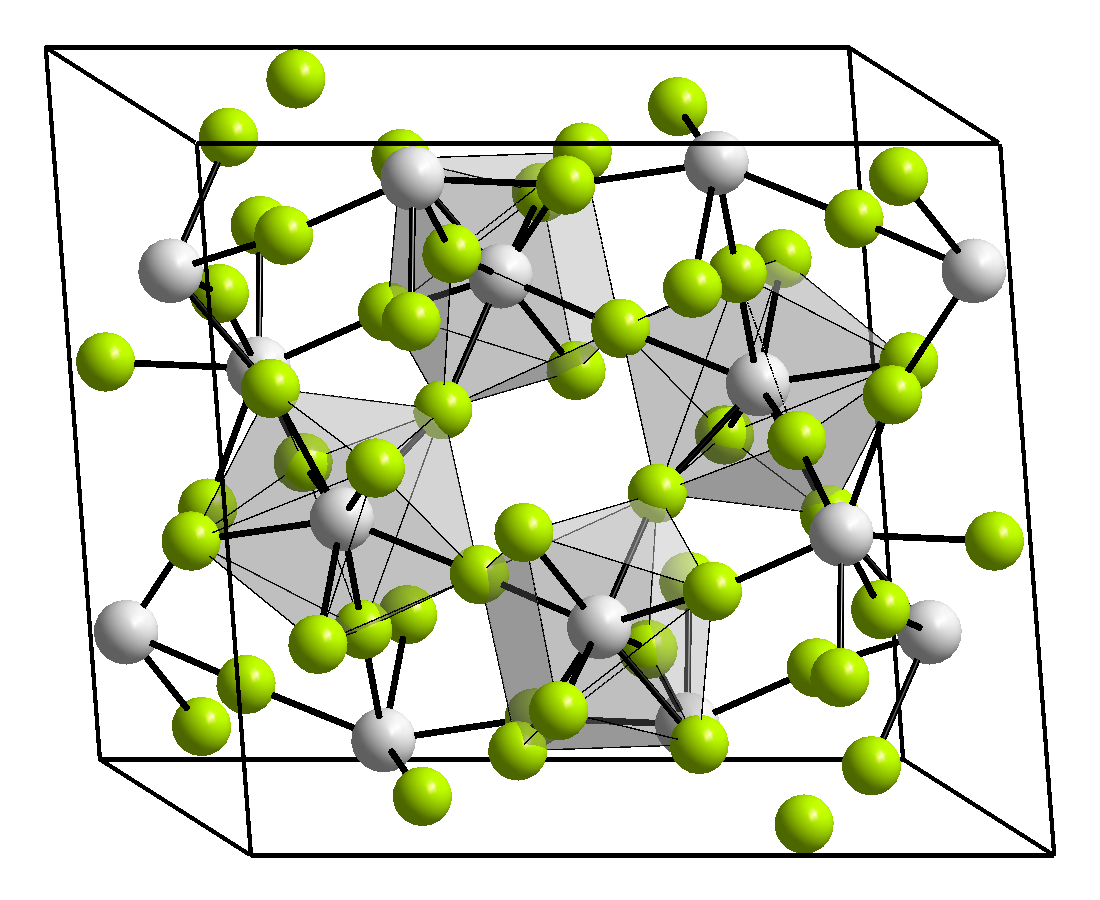
Crystal structure of thorium tetrafluoride. Th^{4+}: __ / F^{−}: __

All four thorium tetrahalides are known, as are some low-valent bromides and iodides: the tetrahalides are all hygroscopic compounds. However, with the exception of thorium tetrafluoride, which is sparingly soluble in water, the other thorium tetrahalides readily dissolve in polar solvents such as water. Additionally, many related polyhalide ions are also known. Thorium tetrafluoride (ThF_{4}, white, m.p. 1068 °C) is most easily produced by reacting various thorium salts, thoria, or thorium hydroxide with hydrogen fluoride: methods that involve steps in the aqueous phase are more difficult because they result in hydroxide and oxide fluorides that have to be reduced with hydrogen fluoride or fluorine gas. It has a monoclinic crystal structure and is isotypic with zirconium tetrafluoride and hafnium tetrafluoride, where the Th^{4+} ions are coordinated with F^{−} ions in somewhat distorted square antiprisms. It is a white, hygroscopic powder: at temperatures above 500 °C, it reacts with atmospheric moisture to produce the oxyfluoride ThOF_{2}.

Thorium tetrachloride (ThCl_{4}, white, m.p. 770 °C) is produced by heating thoria in an organochloride compound such as carbon tetrachloride. The usual method of purification is crystallisation from an aqueous solution and then heating the product above 100 °C to dehydrate it. Further purification can be achieved by subliming it. Its melting and boiling points are respectively 770 °C and 921 °C. It undergoes a phase transition at 405 °C, with a low-temperature α phase and high-temperature β phase. Nevertheless, the β phase usually persists below the transition temperature. Both phases crystallise in the tetragonal crystal system and the structural differences are small. Below −203 °C, a low-temperature form exists with a complex structure.

Thorium tetrabromide (ThBr_{4}, white, m.p. 679 °C) can be produced either by reacting thorium(IV) hydroxide with hydrobromic acid (which has the disadvantage of often resulting in products contaminated with oxybromides) or by directly reacting bromine or hydrogen bromide with thorium metal or compounds. The product can then be purified by sublimation at 600 °C in a vacuum. The melting and boiling points are 679 °C and 857 °C. Like the tetrachloride, both an α and a β form exist and both are isotypic to the tetrachloride forms, though the phase transition here occurs at 426 °C. There is also a low-temperature form. Incomplete reports of the lower bromides ThBr_{3}, ThBr_{2}, and ThBr are known (the last only known as a gas-phase molecular species): ThBr_{3} and ThBr_{2} are known to be very reactive and at high temperatures disproportionate.

Thorium tetraiodide (ThI_{4}, yellow, m.p. 556 °C) is prepared by direct reaction of the elements in a sealed silica ampule. Water and oxygen must not be present, or else ThOI_{2} and ThO_{2} can contaminate the product. It has a different crystal structure from the other tetrahalides, being monoclinic. The lower iodides ThI_{3} (black) and ThI_{2} (gold) can be prepared by reducing the tetraiodide with thorium metal. (ThI is also predicted to form as an intermediate in the dissociation of ThI_{4} to thorium metal.) These do not contain Th(III) and Th(II), but instead contain Th^{4+} and could be more clearly formulated as Th^{4+}(I^{−})_{3}(e^{−}) and Th^{4+}(I^{−})_{2}(e^{−})_{2} respectively. Depending on the amount of time allowed for the reaction between ThI_{4} and thorium, two modifications of ThI_{3} can be produced: shorter times give thin lustrous rods of α-ThI_{3}, while longer times give small β-ThI_{3} crystals with green to brass-coloured luster. Both forms are quickly oxidised by air and reduce water, quickly forming large quantities of hydrogen gas. ThI_{2} also has two modifications, which can be produced by varying the reaction temperature: at 600 °C, α-ThI_{2} is formed, while a reaction temperature of 700–850 °C produces β-ThI_{2}, which has a golden luster.

Many polynary halides with the alkali metals, barium, thallium, and ammonium are known for thorium fluorides, chlorides, and bromides. For example, when treated with potassium fluoride and hydrofluoric acid, Th^{4+} forms the complex anion ThF^{2−}_{6}, which precipitates as an insoluble salt, K_{2}ThF_{6}.

== Chalcogenides and pnictides ==
The heavier chalcogens sulfur, selenium, and tellurium are known to form thorium chalcogenides, many of which have more complex structure than the oxides. Apart from several binary compounds, the oxychalcogenides ThOS (yellow), ThOSe, and ThOTe are also known. The five binary thorium sulfides – ThS (lustrous metallic), Th_{2}S_{3} (brown metallic), Th_{7}S_{12} (black), ThS_{2} (purple-brown), and Th_{2}S_{5} (orange-brown) – may be produced by reacting hydrogen sulfide with thorium, its halides, or thoria (the last if carbon is present): they all hydrolyse in acidic solutions. The six selenides are analogous to the sulfides, with the addition of ThSe_{3}. The five tellurides are also similar to the sulfides and selenides (although Th_{2}Te_{5} is unknown), but have slightly different crystal structures: for example, ThS has the sodium chloride structure, but ThTe has the caesium chloride structure, since the Th^{4+} and Te^{2−} ions are similar in size while the S^{2−} ions are much smaller.

All five chemically characterised pnictogens (nitrogen, phosphorus, arsenic, antimony, and bismuth) also form compounds with thorium. Three thorium nitrides are known: ThN, Th_{3}N_{4}, and Th_{2}N_{3}. The brass-coloured Th_{3}N_{4} is most easily produced by heating thorium metal in a nitrogen atmosphere. Th_{3}N_{4} and Th_{2}N_{3} decompose to the golden-yellow ThN, and indeed ThN can often be seen covering the surface of Th_{3}N_{4} samples because Th_{3}N_{4} is hygroscopic and water vapour in the air can decompose it: thin films of ThN are metallic in character and, like all other actinide mononitrides, has the sodium chloride structure. ThN is also a low-temperature superconductor. All three nitrides can react with thorium halides to form halide nitrides ThNX (X = F, Cl, Br, I). The heavier pnictogens also form analogous monopnictides, except ThBi which has not yet been structurally characterised. The other well-characterised thorium pnictides are Th_{3}P_{4}, Th_{2}P_{11}, ThP_{7}, Th_{3}As_{4}, ThAs_{2}, Th_{3}Sb_{4}, ThSb_{2}, and ThBi_{2}.

== Other inorganic compounds ==
Thorium reacts with hydrogen to form the thorium hydrides ThH_{2} and Th_{4}H_{15}, the latter of which is superconducting below the transition temperature of 7.5–8 K; at standard temperature and pressure, it conducts electricity like a metal. Thorium is the only metallic element that readily forms a hydride higher than MH_{3}. Finely divided thorium metal reacts very readily with hydrogen at standard conditions, but large pieces may need to be heated to 300–400 °C for a reaction to take place. Around 850 °C, the reaction forming first ThH_{2} and then Th_{4}H_{15} occurs without breaking up the structure of the thorium metal. Thorium hydrides react readily with oxygen or steam to form thoria, and at 250–350 °C quickly react with hydrogen halides, sulfides, phosphides, and nitrides to form the corresponding thorium binary compounds.

Three binary thorium borides are known: ThB_{6}, ThB_{4}, and ThB_{12}. The last is isotypic with UB_{12}. While reports of ThB_{66} and ThB_{76} exist, they may simply be thorium-stabilised boron allotropes. ThB_{6} and ThB_{12} may be produced by heating thorium with boron. The three known binary thorium carbides are ThC_{2}, Th_{2}C_{3}, and ThC: all are produced by reacting thorium or thoria with carbon. ThC and ThC_{2} are refractory solids and have melting points over 2600 °C. Thorium borides, carbides, silicides, and nitrates are refractory materials, as are those of uranium and plutonium, and have thus received attention as possible nuclear fuels.

== Coordination compounds ==
Many other inorganic thorium compounds with polyatomic anions are known, such as the perchlorates, sulfates, sulfites, nitrates, carbonates, phosphates, vanadates, molybdates, chromates, and other oxometallates, (Note: Among the low number of other known thorium oxometallates are the arsenate, tungstate, germanate, silicate, borate, and perrhenate. While thorium titanates and tantalates are known, they are structurally more like double oxides than true oxometallates.) many of which are known in hydrated forms. These are important in thorium purification and the disposal of nuclear waste, but most have not yet been fully characterized, especially on their structural properties. For example, thorium perchlorate is very water-soluble and crystallises from acidic solutions as the tetrahydrate Th(ClO_{4})_{4}·4H_{2}O, while thorium nitrate forms tetra- and pentahydrates, is soluble in water and alcohols, and is an important intermediate in the purification of thorium and its compounds.

Thorium halides can often coordinate with lewis-acid solvents such as tetrahydrofuran and pyridine as follows:

ThX_{4} + THF → ThX_{4}(THF)_{3}

Due to its great tendency towards hydrolysis, thorium does not form simple carbonates, but rather carbonato complexes such as [Th(CO_{3})_{5}]^{6−}, similarly to uranium(IV) and plutonium(IV). Thorium forms a stable tetranitrate, Th(NO_{3})_{4}·5H_{2}O, a property shared only by plutonium(IV) among the actinides: it is the most common thorium salt and was the first known example of an 11-coordinated compound. Another example of the high coordination characteristic of thorium is [Th(C_{5}H_{5}NO)_{6}(NO_{3})_{2}]^{2+}, a 10-coordinated complex with distorted bicapped antiprismatic molecular geometry. The anionic [Th(NO_{3})_{6}]^{2−} is isotypic to its cerium, uranium, neptunium, and plutonium analogues and has a distorted icosahedral structure. Particularly important is the borohydride, Th(BH_{4})_{4}, first prepared in the Manhattan Project along with its uranium(IV) analogue. It is produced as follows:

ThF_{4} + 2 Al(BH_{4})_{3} → Th(BH_{4})_{4} + 2 AlF_{2}BH_{4}

following which thorium borohydride can be easily isolated, as it sublimes out of the reaction mixture. Like its protactinium(IV) and uranium(IV) analogues, it is a thermally and chemically stable compound where thorium has a coordination number of 14 with a bicapped hexagonal antiprismatic molecular geometry.

== Organometallic compounds ==
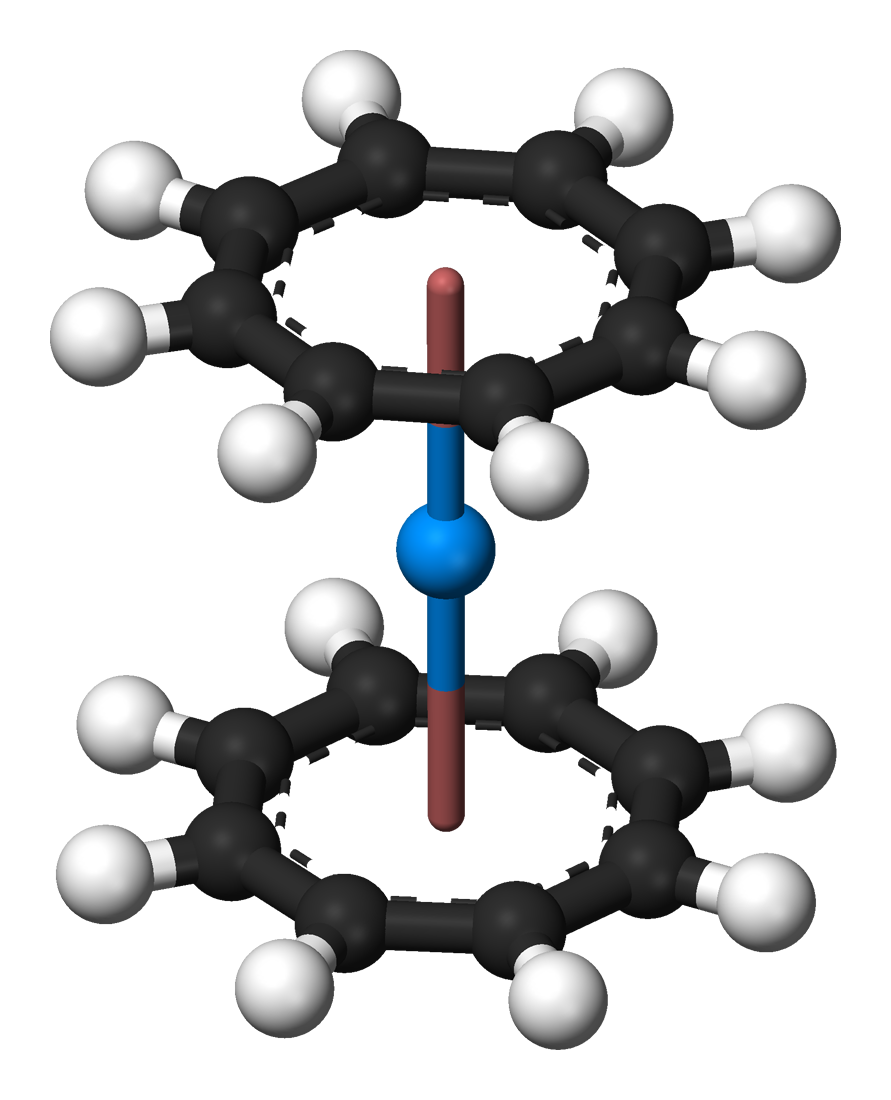
Structure of thorocene

Most of the work on organothorium compounds has focused on the cyclopentadienyls and cyclooctatetraenyls. Like many of the early and middle actinides (thorium through americium, and also expected for curium), thorium forms the yellow cyclooctatetraenide complex Th(C_{8}H_{8})_{2}, thorocene. It is isotypic with the more well-known analogous uranium compound, uranocene. Although these f-series cyclooctatetraenyls are not isotypic with the d-series cyclopentadienyls, including the more famous ferrocene, they have very similar structures, and were named to emphasise this resemblance. It can be prepared by reacting K_{2}C_{8}H_{8} with thorium tetrachloride in tetrahydrofuran (THF) at the temperature of dry ice, or by reacting thorium tetrafluoride with MgC_{8}H_{8}. It is an unstable compound in air and outright decomposes in water or at 190 °C. Half-sandwich compounds are also known, such as 2(η^{8}-C_{8}H_{8})ThCl_{2}(THF)_{2}, which has a piano-stool structure and is made by reacting thorocene with thorium tetrachloride in tetrahydrofuran.

The simplest of the cyclopentadienyls are Th^{III}(C_{5}H_{5})_{3} and Th^{IV}(C_{5}H_{5})_{4}: many derivatives are known. The first (which has two forms, one purple and one green) is a rare example of thorium in the formal +3 oxidation state. In the derivative [Th^{III}{η^{5}-C_{5}H_{3}(SiMe_{3})_{2}}_{3}], a blue paramagnetic compound, the molecular geometry is trigonal planar around the thorium atom, which has a [Rn]6d^{1} configuration instead of the expected [Rn]5f^{1}. [Th^{III}{η^{5}-C_{5}H_{3}(SiMe_{3})_{2}}_{3}] can be reduced to the anion [Th^{II}{η^{5}-C_{5}H_{3}(SiMe_{3})_{2}}_{3}]^{−}, in which thorium exhibits a very rare +2 oxidation state. The second is prepared by heating thorium tetrachloride with K(C_{5}H_{5}) under reflux in benzene: the four cyclopentadienyl rings are arranged tetrahedrally around the central thorium atom. The halide derivative Th(C_{5}H_{5})_{3}Cl can be made similarly by reducing the amount of K(C_{5}H_{5}) used (other univalent metal cyclopentadienyls can also be used), and the chlorine atom may be further replaced by other halogens or by alkoxy, alkyl, aryl, or BH_{4} groups. Of these, the alkyl and aryl derivatives have been investigated more deeply due to the insight they give regarding the nature of the Th–C σ bond. Of special interest is the dimer [Th(η^{5}-C_{5}H_{5})_{2}-μ-(η^{5},η^{1}-C_{5}H_{5})]_{2}, where the two thorium atoms are bridged by two cyclopentadienyl rings, similarly to the structure of niobocene.

Tetrabenzylthorium, Th(CH_{2}C_{6}H_{5}), is known, but its structure has not yet been determined. Thorium forms the monocapped trigonal prismatic anion [Th(CH_{3})_{7}]^{3−}, heptamethylthorate, which forms the salt [Li(tmeda)]_{3}[ThMe_{7}] (tmeda = Me_{2}NCH_{2}CH_{2}NMe_{2}). Although one methyl group is only attached to the thorium atom (Th–C distance 257.1 pm) and the other six connect the lithium and thorium atoms (Th–C distances 265.5–276.5 pm) they behave equivalently in solution. Tetramethylthorium, Th(CH_{3})_{4}, is not known, but its adducts are stabilised by phosphine ligands. Some coordination complexes with carboxylates and acetylacetonates are also known, although these are not organothorium compounds.

== See also ==
- Cerium compounds
- Actinium compounds
- Protactinium compounds
- Uranium compounds

== Bibliography ==
- Golub, A. M. (1971). Общая и неорганическая химия (General and Inorganic Chemistry). Vol. 2.
- Greenwood, Norman N.; Earnshaw, Alan (1997). Chemistry of the Elements (2nd ed.). Butterworth-Heinemann. doi:10.1016/C2009-0-30414-6. ISBN 978-0-08-037941-8.
- Wickleder, Mathias S.; Fourest, Blandine; Dorhout, Peter K. (2006). "Thorium". In Morss, Lester R.; Edelstein, Norman M.; Fuger, Jean (eds.). The Chemistry of the Actinide and Transactinide Elements (PDF). Vol. 3 (3rd ed.). Dordrecht, the Netherlands: Springer. pp. 52–160. doi:10.1007/1-4020-3598-5_3. ISBN 978-1-4020-3555-5. Archived from the original (PDF) on 2016-03-07.
