= Actinium(III) phosphate =

Names
- Other names Actinium monophosphate

Identifiers
3D model (JSmol)	Interactive image
- InChI: InChI=1S/Ac.H3O4P/c;1-5(2,3)4/h;(H3,1,2,3,4)/q+3;/p-3 Key: PVLPTTWSKILMQQ-UHFFFAOYSA-K
- SMILES: [O-]P(=O)([O-])[O-].[Ac+3]

Properties
Chemical formula	AcPO_{4}
Molar mass	321.9714 g/mol
Appearance	White solid
Density	5.48 g/cm^{3}

Structure
Crystal structure	hexagonal
- Except where otherwise noted, data are given for materials in their standard state (at 25 °C [77 °F], 100 kPa). Infobox references

Actinium(III) phosphate is a white-colored chemical compound of the radioactive element actinium. This salt was created by reacting actinium(III) chloride with monosodium phosphate in aqueous hydrochloric acid. This resulted in the hemihydrate AcPO_{4}·1/2H_{2}O, whose structure was confirmed by x-ray diffraction to match that of lanthanum phosphate. To become anhydrous, it was heated to 700 °C, which resulted in a solid that was black (presumably due to the presence of impurities), and whose specific X-ray structure did not match that of other known correspond to other actinide phosphates.
