= Erbium oxybromide =

Inorganic chemical compound

Names
- IUPAC name bromo(oxo)erbium
- Other names Erbium oxide bromide

Identifiers
3D model (JSmol)	Interactive image
- InChI: InChI=1S/BrH.Er.O/h1H;;/q;+3;-2/p-1 Key: LHSFAROYUJRCQG-UHFFFAOYSA-M
- SMILES: [Br-].[Er+3].[O-2]

Properties
Chemical formula	ErOBr
Appearance	crystals

Structure
Crystal structure	tetragonal
Space group	P4/nmm

Related compounds
Related compounds	Actinium oxybromide; Praseodymium oxybromide
- Except where otherwise noted, data are given for materials in their standard state (at 25 °C [77 °F], 100 kPa). Infobox references

Erbium oxybromide or erbium oxide bromide is an inorganic compound of erbium, oxygen, and bromine with the chemical formula ErOBr.

== Physical properties ==
The compound forms crystals of the tetragonal system, space group P4/nmm.
