= Actinium(III) nitrate =

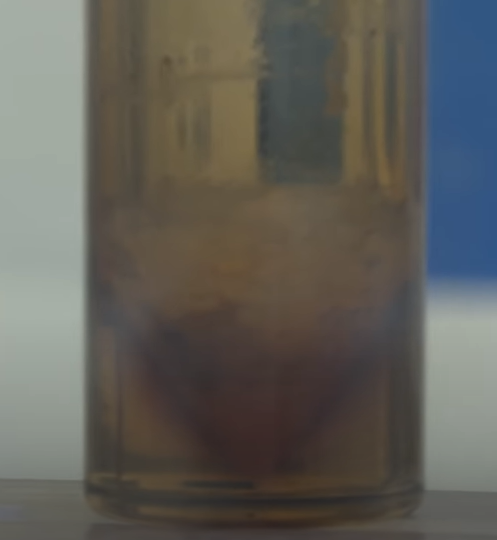
- The glass is discolored due to the high radiation of actinium

Names
- Other names Actinium nitrate

Identifiers
| CAS Number | 211179-74-7 |
| 3D model (JSmol) | Interactive image |
| PubChem CID | 129641620 |
- InChI: InChI=1S/Ac.3NO3/c;3*2-1(3)4/q;3*-1 Key: AEFUOHSKBCUMLM-UHFFFAOYSA-N
- SMILES: [N+](=O)([O-])[O-].[N+](=O)([O-])[O-].[N+](=O)([O-])[O-].[Ac]

Properties
| Chemical formula | Ac(NO_{3})_{3} |
| Molar mass | 413.04 |
| Appearance | White substance |
| Solubility in water | Soluble |

Hazards
- GHS labelling
| Signal word | Warning |

Related compounds
| Related compounds | Thorium(IV) nitrate |
- Except where otherwise noted, data are given for materials in their standard state (at 25 °C [77 °F], 100 kPa). Infobox references

Actinium(III) nitrate is an inorganic compound, actinium salt of nitric acid with the chemical formula Ac(NO_{3})_{3}. The compound looks like a white substance, readily soluble in water.

== Synthesis ==
Actinium nitrate can be obtained by dissolving actinium or actinium hydroxide in nitric acid.

Ac(OH)_{3} + 3HNO_{3} → Ac(NO_{3})_{3} + 3H_{2}O

== Properties ==
Actinium(III) nitrate decomposes on heating above 600 °C:

4Ac(NO_{3})_{3} → 2Ac_{2}O_{3} + 12NO_{2} + 3O_{2}

This salt is used as a source of Ac^{3+} ions to obtain insoluble actinium compounds by precipitation from aqueous solutions.
