= André-Louis Debierne =

French chemist (1874–1949)

- Born: 14 July 1874; Paris, France
- Died: 31 August 1949 (aged 75); Paris, France
- Known for: discovery of actinium
- Scientific career
- Doctoral advisor: Pierre Curie
- Other academic advisors: Charles Friedel

André-Louis Debierne (French pronunciation: [ɑ̃dʁe lwi dəbjɛʁn]; 14 July 1874 – 31 August 1949) was a French chemist. He is often considered the discoverer of the element actinium, though H. W. Kirby disputed this in 1971 and gave credit instead to German chemist Friedrich Oskar Giesel.

== Biography ==
Debierne studied at the elite École supérieure de physique et de chimie industrielles de la ville de Paris (ESPCI ParisTech).

He was a student of Charles Friedel, was a close friend of Pierre and Marie Curie and was associated with their work. In 1899, he discovered the radioactive element actinium, as a result of continuing the work with pitchblende that the Curies had initiated.

After the death of Pierre Curie in 1906, Debierne helped Marie Curie carry on and worked with her in teaching and research.

In 1911, he and Marie Curie prepared radium in metallic form in visible amounts. They did not keep it metallic, however. Having demonstrated the metal's existence as a matter of scientific curiosity, they reconverted it into compounds with which they might continue their researches.
