= Einsteinium oxybromide =

Names
- IUPAC name Einsteinium(III) oxybromide

Identifiers
3D model (JSmol)	Interactive image
- InChI: InChI=1S/BrH.Es.O/h1H;;/q;+3;-2/p-1 Key: FHTYFMKHHBMHMN-UHFFFAOYSA-M
- SMILES: [O-2].[Br-].[Es+3]
- Except where otherwise noted, data are given for materials in their standard state (at 25 °C [77 °F], 100 kPa). Infobox references

Einsteinium oxybromide is a radioactive, synthetic inorganic compound with the chemical formula EsOBr. In this compound, einsteinium is in its most stable and predominant oxidation state of +3, balanced by a bromide ion and an oxide ion. It is synthesized by reacting einsteinium tribromide with a vapor mixture of water and hydrogen bromide at elevated temperatures.

== Applications ==
Einsteinium oxybromide has no commercial, industrial, or practical applications.
