= Lanthanum oxide =

Chemical compound

Lanthanum(III) oxide
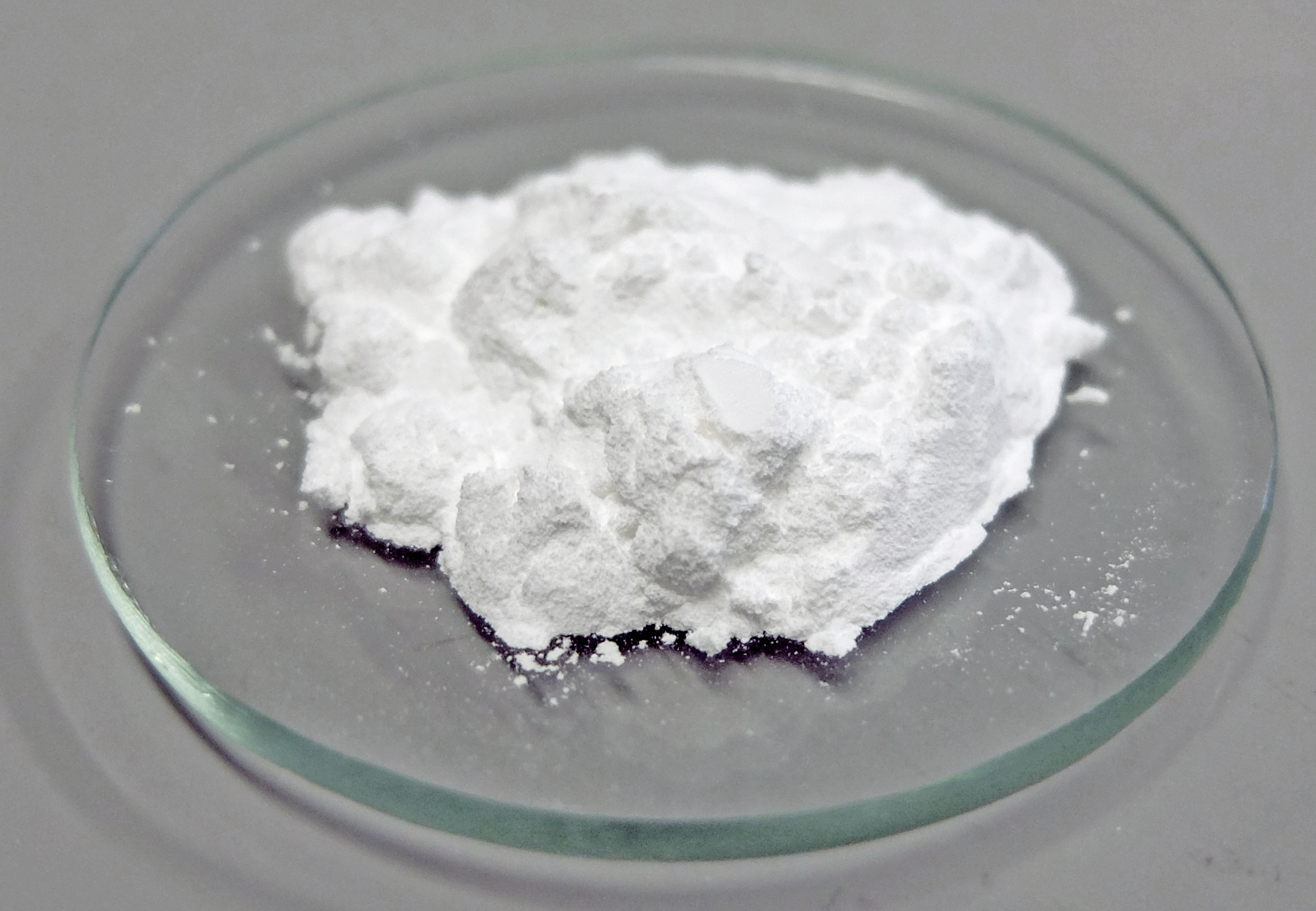
- Lanthanum(III) oxide

Names
- IUPAC name Lanthanum(III) oxide
- Other names Lanthanum sesquioxide Lanthana

Identifiers
CAS Number	1312-81-8
3D model (JSmol)	Interactive image
ChemSpider	2529886; 133008
ECHA InfoCard	100.013.819
EC Number	215-200-5
PubChem CID	150906
RTECS number	OE5330000
UNII	4QI5EL790W
CompTox Dashboard (EPA)	DTXSID7051478
- InChI: InChI=1S/2La.3O/q2*+3;3*-2 Key: MRELNEQAGSRDBK-UHFFFAOYSA-N
- SMILES: [O-2].[O-2].[O-2].[La+3].[La+3]

Properties
Chemical formula	La_{2}O_{3}
Molar mass	325.808 g·mol^{−1}
Appearance	White powder, hygroscopic
Density	6.51 g/cm^{3}, solid
Melting point	2,315 °C (4,199 °F; 2,588 K)
Boiling point	4,200 °C (7,590 °F; 4,470 K)
Solubility in water	Insoluble
Band gap	4.3 eV
Magnetic susceptibility (χ)	−78.0·10^{−6} cm^{3}/mol

Structure
Crystal structure	Hexagonal, hP5
Space group	P-3m1, No. 164

Hazards
- Occupational safety and health (OHS/OSH)
Main hazards	Irritant
- GHS labelling
Pictograms	(GHS07: Exclamation mark)
Signal word	Warning
Hazard statements	H315, H319, H335
Precautionary statements	P261, P280, P301+P310, P304+P340, P305+P351+P338, P405, P501
NFPA 704 (fire diamond)	1 W
Flash point	Non-flammable

Related compounds
Other anions	Lanthanum(III) chloride
Other cations	Cerium(III) oxide; Actinium(III) oxide
Related compounds	Lanthanum aluminium oxide; LaSrCoO_{4}
- Except where otherwise noted, data are given for materials in their standard state (at 25 °C [77 °F], 100 kPa). verify (what is ?) Infobox references

Lanthanum(III) oxide, also known as lanthana, chemical formula La_{2}O_{3}, is an inorganic compound containing the rare-earth element lanthanum and oxygen. It is used in some ferroelectric materials, as a component of optical materials, and is a feedstock for certain catalysts, among other uses.

== Properties ==
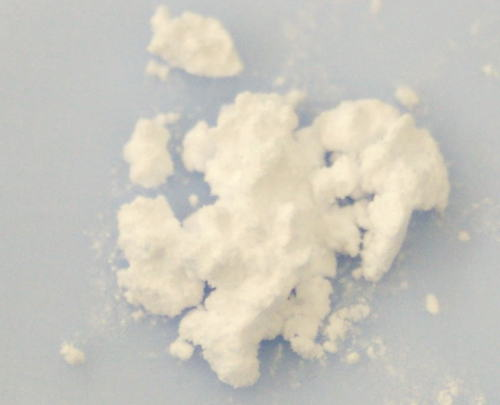
La_{2}O_{3} powder

Lanthanum oxide is a white solid that is insoluble in water, but dissolves in acidic solutions. La_{2}O_{3} absorbs moisture from air, converting to lanthanum hydroxide. Lanthanum oxide has p-type semiconducting properties and a band gap of approximately 5.8 eV. Its average room-temperature resistivity is 10 kΩ·cm, which decreases with an increase in temperature. La_{2}O_{3} has the lowest lattice energy of the rare-earth oxides, with very high dielectric constant ε = 27.

== Structure ==
At low temperatures, La_{2}O_{3} has an A-M_{2}O_{3} hexagonal crystal structure. The La^{3+} metal atoms are surrounded by a 7-coordinate group of O^{2−} atoms, the oxygen ions are in an octahedral shape around the metal atom, and there is one oxygen ion above one of the octahedral faces. On the other hand, at high temperatures lanthanum oxide converts to a C-M_{2}O_{3} cubic crystal structure. The La^{3+} ion is surrounded by six O^{2−} ions in a hexagonal configuration.

== Synthesis ==
Lanthanum oxide can crystallize in at least three polymorphs.

Hexagonal La_{2}O_{3} has been produced by spray pyrolysis of lanthanum chloride:

2 LaCl_{3} + 3 H_{2}O → La(OH)_{3} + 3 HCl
2 La(OH)_{3} → La_{2}O_{3} + 3 H_{2}O

An alternative route to obtaining hexagonal La_{2}O_{3} involves precipitation of nominal La(OH)_{3} from aqueous solution using a combination of 2.5% NH_{3} and the surfactant sodium dodecyl sulfate followed by heating and stirring for 24 hours at 80 °C:

2 LaCl_{3} + 3 H_{2}O + 3 NH_{3} → La(OH)_{3} + 3 [NH_{4}]Cl

Other routes include

2 La_{2}S_{3} + 3 CO_{2} → 2 La_{2}O_{3} + 3 CS_{2}

== Reactions ==
Lanthanum oxide is used as an additive to develop certain ferroelectric materials, such as La-doped bismuth titanate (Bi_{4}Ti_{3}O_{12}, "BLT"). Lanthanum oxide is used in optical materials; often the optical glasses are doped with La_{2}O_{3} to improve the glass' refractive index, chemical durability, and mechanical strength.

3 B_{2}O_{3} + La_{2}O_{3} → 2 La(BO_{2})_{3}

The addition of the La_{2}O_{3} to the glass melt leads to a higher glass-transition temperature from 658 °C to 679 °C. The addition also leads to a higher density, microhardness, and refractive index of the glass.

== Potential applications ==
Lanthanum oxide is most useful as a precursor to other lanthanum compounds. Neither the oxide nor any of the derived materials enjoys substantial commercial value, unlike some of the other lanthanides. Many reports describe efforts toward practical applications of La_{2}O_{3}, as described below.

La_{2}O_{3} forms glasses of high density, refractive index, and hardness. Together with oxides of tungsten, tantalum, and thorium, La_{2}O_{3} improves the resistance of the glass to attack by alkali. La_{2}O_{3} is an ingredient in some piezoelectric and thermoelectric materials.

La_{2}O_{3} has been examined for the oxidative coupling of methane.
