= Berkelium fluoride =

Berkelium fluoride may refer to:

- Berkelium(III) fluoride (Berkelium trifluoride), BkF_{3}
- Berkelium(IV) fluoride (Berkelium tetrafluoride), BkF_{4}
