= Actinium(III) bromide =

Names
- Other names Actinium tribromide

Identifiers
CAS Number	33689-81-5
3D model (JSmol)	Interactive image
ChemSpider	23620756
PubChem CID	57348990
CompTox Dashboard (EPA)	DTXSID40721762
- InChI: InChI=1S/Ac.3BrH/h;3*1H/p-3 Key: KATYVAFQSWUUQL-UHFFFAOYSA-K
- SMILES: [Br-].[Br-].[Br-].[Ac]

Properties
Chemical formula	AcBr_{3}
Molar mass	466.74 g/mol
Appearance	White crystalline solid
Density	5.85 g/cm^{3}
Melting point	827 °C (1,521 °F; 1,100 K)
Boiling point	1,597 °C (2,907 °F; 1,870 K)
Solubility in water	soluble

Structure
Crystal structure	hexagonal, hP8

Related compounds
Other anions	Actinium(III) chloride
Other cations	Lanthanum(III) bromide
- Except where otherwise noted, data are given for materials in their standard state (at 25 °C [77 °F], 100 kPa). Infobox references

Actinium(III) bromide is a radioactive white crystalline solid that is a salt of actinium. It is prepared by reacting actinium(III) oxide with aluminium bromide at 750 °C.

== Reactions ==
When treated with a mixture of gaseous ammonia and water vapor at 500 °C, it turns into actinium oxybromide.
