= Actinium(III) fluoride =

Actinium fluoride
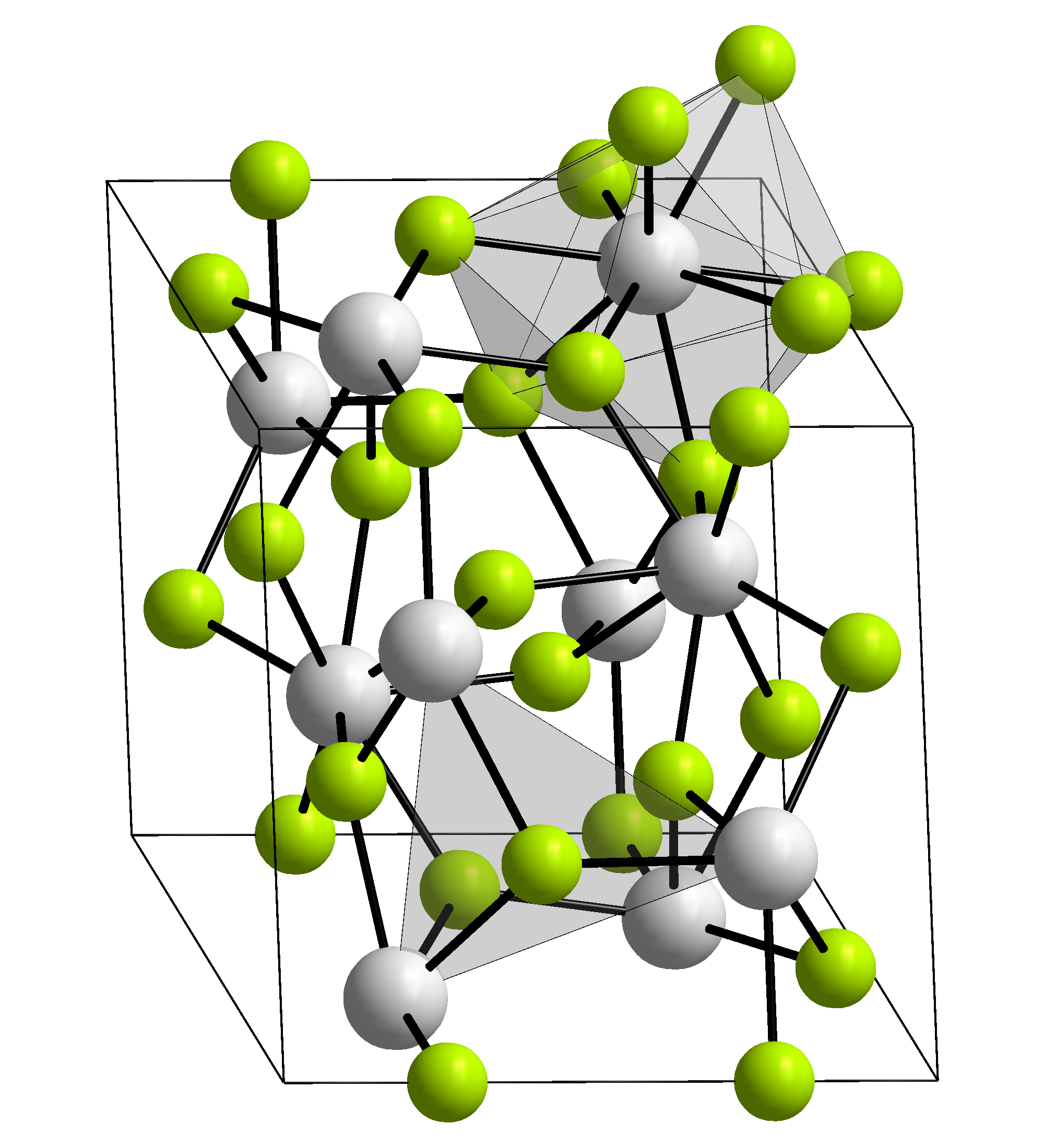
- Crystal structure

Names
- Other names Actinium(III) fluoride Actinium trifluoride

Identifiers
CAS Number	33689-80-4
3D model (JSmol)	Interactive image
PubChem CID	101943120
- InChI: InChI=1S/Ac.3FH/h;3*1H/q+3;;;/p-3; InChI=1/Ac.3FH/h;3*1H/q+3;;;/p-3
- SMILES: F[Ac](F)F

Properties
Chemical formula	AcF_{3}
Molar mass	284 g/mol
Appearance	white, crystalline solid
Density	7.88 g/cm^{3}

Structure
Crystal structure	Rhombohedral, hR24
Space group	P3̅c1, No. 165
Lattice constant	a = 0.741 nm, c = 0.755 nm
Lattice volume (V)	0.35902
Formula units (Z)	6
- Except where otherwise noted, data are given for materials in their standard state (at 25 °C [77 °F], 100 kPa). verify (what is ?) Infobox references

Actinium(III) fluoride (AcF_{3}) is an inorganic compound, a salt of actinium and fluorine.

== Synthesis ==
Actinium fluoride can be prepared in solution or by a solid-state reaction. In the first method, actinium hydroxide is treated with hydrofluoric acid and the product precipitates:

Ac(OH)_{3} + 3HF → AcF_{3}↓ + 3H_{2}O

In the solid-state reaction, actinium metal is treated with hydrogen fluoride gas at 700 °C in a platinum crucible.

== Properties ==
Actinium fluoride is a white solid that reacts with ammonia at 900–1000 °C to yield an actinium oxyfluoride:

AcF_{3} + 2NH_{3} + H_{2}O -> AcOF + 2NH_{4}F

While lanthanum oxyfluoride is easily formed by heating lanthanum fluoride in air, a similar treatment merely melts actinium fluoride and does not yield AcOF.
