= Plutonium oxybromide =

Names
- Other names Plutonium oxide bromide

Identifiers
| 3D model (JSmol) | Interactive image |
- InChI: InChI=1S/BrH.O.Pu/h1H;;/q;-2;+3/p-1 Key: ODEGMVNQVBPJDS-UHFFFAOYSA-M
- SMILES: [Br-].[O-2].[Pu+3]

Properties
| Chemical formula | PuOBr |
| Molar mass | 340 g/mol |
| Appearance | dark green crystals |
| Density | 9.00 g/cm^{3} |
| Solubility in water | insoluble |

Structure
| Crystal structure | tetragonal |
| Space group | P4/nmm |

Related compounds
| Other anions | Plutonium oxyfluoride Plutonium oxychloride Plutonium oxyiodide |
| Other cations | Actinium oxybromide Neodymium oxybromide |
- Except where otherwise noted, data are given for materials in their standard state (at 25 °C [77 °F], 100 kPa). Infobox references

Plutonium oxybromide is an inorganic compound of plutonium, oxygen, and bromine with the chemical formula PuOBr.

== Synthesis ==
The compound was first observed by Davidson et al. in 1949 as a residue from the sublimation of small amounts of PuBr_{3} in a silica tube. Pure PuOBr can be obtained by treating plutonim(IV) hydroxide with moist hydrogen bromide at 750 °C.

It is also produced in the reaction between plutonium dioxide and hydrogen bromide:

PuO_{2} + ½H_{2} + HBr → PuOBr + H_{2}O

== Physical properties ==
Plutonium oxybromide forms dark green crystals of tetragonal system, space group P4/nmm.

== Chemical properties ==
The compound reacts with dilute acids:

PuOBr + 2HBr → PuBr_{3} + H_{2}O
