= Actinium =

Actinium, _{89}Ac
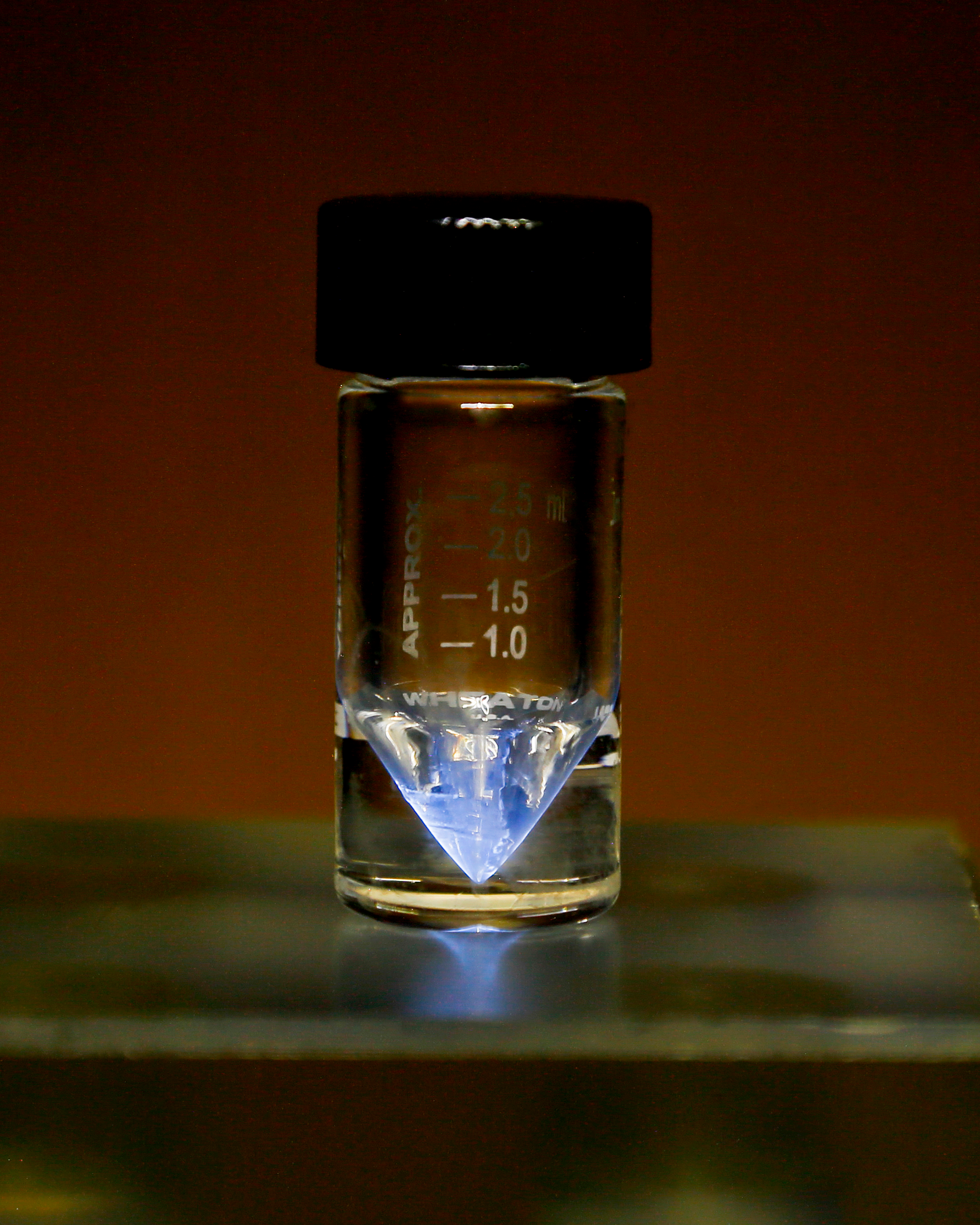

Actinium
- Pronunciation: /ækˈtɪniəm/ (ak-TIN-ee-əm)
- Appearance: silvery-white, glowing with an eerie blue light; sometimes with a golden cast
- Mass number: [227]

Actinium in the periodic table
Hydrogen																															Helium
Lithium	Beryllium																									Boron	Carbon	Nitrogen	Oxygen	Fluorine	Neon
Sodium	Magnesium																									Aluminium	Silicon	Phosphorus	Sulfur	Chlorine	Argon
Potassium	Calcium															Scandium	Titanium	Vanadium	Chromium	Manganese	Iron	Cobalt	Nickel	Copper	Zinc	Gallium	Germanium	Arsenic	Selenium	Bromine	Krypton
Rubidium	Strontium															Yttrium	Zirconium	Niobium	Molybdenum	Technetium	Ruthenium	Rhodium	Palladium	Silver	Cadmium	Indium	Tin	Antimony	Tellurium	Iodine	Xenon
Caesium	Barium	Lanthanum	Cerium	Praseodymium	Neodymium	Promethium	Samarium	Europium	Gadolinium	Terbium	Dysprosium	Holmium	Erbium	Thulium	Ytterbium	Lutetium	Hafnium	Tantalum	Tungsten	Rhenium	Osmium	Iridium	Platinum	Gold	Mercury (element)	Thallium	Lead	Bismuth	Polonium	Astatine	Radon
Francium	Radium	Actinium	Thorium	Protactinium	Uranium	Neptunium	Plutonium	Americium	Curium	Berkelium	Californium	Einsteinium	Fermium	Mendelevium	Nobelium	Lawrencium	Rutherfordium	Dubnium	Seaborgium	Bohrium	Hassium	Meitnerium	Darmstadtium	Roentgenium	Copernicium	Nihonium	Flerovium	Moscovium	Livermorium	Tennessine	Oganesson
La
↑
Ac
↓
(Ubu)
radium ← actinium → thorium
- Atomic number (Z): 89
- Group: f-block groups (no number)
- Period: period 7
- Block: f-block
- Electron configuration: [Rn] 6d^{1} 7s^{2}
- Electrons per shell: 2, 8, 18, 32, 18, 9, 2

Physical properties
- Phase at STP: solid
- Melting point: 1500 K (1227 °C, 2240 °F) (estimated)
- Boiling point: 3500±300 K (3200±300 °C, 5800±500 °F) (extrapolated)
- Density (near r.t.): 10 g/cm^{3}
- Heat of fusion: 14 kJ/mol
- Heat of vaporization: 400 kJ/mol
- Molar heat capacity: 27.2 J/(mol·K)

Atomic properties
- Oxidation states: common: +3 +2
- Electronegativity: Pauling scale: 1.1
- Ionization energies: 1st: 499 kJ/mol; 2nd: 1170 kJ/mol; 3rd: 1900 kJ/mol; (more)
- Covalent radius: 215 pm
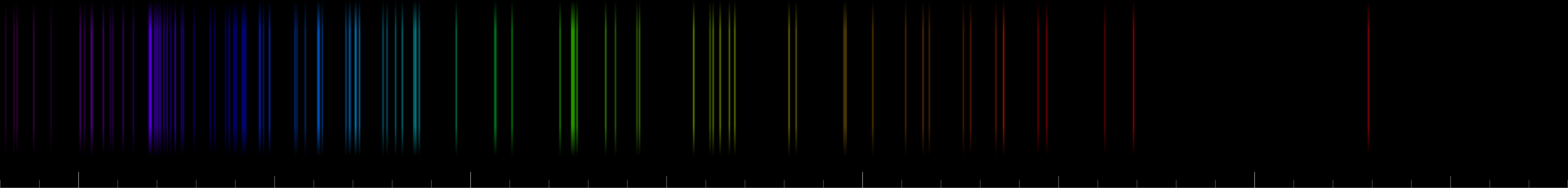
- Spectral lines of actinium

Other properties
- Natural occurrence: from decay
- Crystal structure: face-centered cubic (fcc) (cF4)
- Lattice constant: a = 531.5 pm (at 20 °C)
- Thermal conductivity: 12 W/(m⋅K)
- CAS Number: 7440-34-8

History
- Naming: from the Ancient Greek ακτίς, "beam" or "ray"
- Discovery: Friedrich Oskar Giesel (1902)
- First isolation: Joseph G. Stites, Murrell L. Salutsky, Bob D. Stone (1955)
- Named by: André-Louis Debierne (1899)

Isotopes of actinium
Main isotopes			Decay	
Isotope	abundance	half-life (t_{1/2})	mode	product
^{225}Ac	trace	9.919 d	α	^{221}Fr
^{226}Ac	synth	29.37 h	β^{−}	^{226}Th
^{226}Ac	synth	29.37 h	ε	^{226}Ra
^{226}Ac	synth	29.37 h	α	^{222}Fr
^{227}Ac	trace	21.772 y	β^{−}	^{227}Th
^{227}Ac	trace	21.772 y	α	^{223}Fr
^{228}Ac	trace	6.15 h	β^{−}	^{228}Th

Actinium is a chemical element; it has symbol Ac and atomic number 89. It was discovered by Friedrich Oskar Giesel in 1902, who gave it the name emanium; the element got its name by being wrongly identified with a substance André-Louis Debierne found in 1899 and called actinium. The actinide series, a set of 15 elements between actinium and lawrencium in the periodic table, is named after actinium. Together with polonium, radium, and radon, actinium was one of the first non-primordial radioactive elements to be discovered.

A soft, silvery-white radioactive metal, actinium reacts rapidly with oxygen and moisture in air, forming a white coating of actinium oxide that prevents further oxidation. As with most lanthanides and many actinides, actinium assumes oxidation state +3 in nearly all its chemical compounds. Actinium is found only in traces in uranium and thorium ores as the isotope ^{227}Ac, which decays with a half-life of 21.772 years, predominantly emitting beta and sometimes alpha particles, and ^{228}Ac, which is beta active with a half-life of 6.15 hours. One tonne of natural uranium in ore contains about 0.2 milligrams of actinium-227, and one tonne of thorium contains about 5 nanograms of actinium-228. The close similarity of physical and chemical properties of actinium and lanthanum makes the separation of actinium from the ore impractical. Instead, the element is prepared, in milligram amounts, by the neutron irradiation of ^{226}Ra in a nuclear reactor. Owing to its scarcity, high price, and radioactivity, actinium has no significant industrial use. Its current applications include a neutron source and an agent for radiation therapy.

== History ==
André-Louis Debierne, a French chemist, announced the discovery of a new element in 1899. He separated it from pitchblende residues left by Marie and Pierre Curie after they had extracted radium. In 1899, Debierne described the substance as similar to titanium and (in 1900) as similar to thorium. Friedrich Oskar Giesel found in 1902 a substance similar to lanthanum and called it "emanium" in 1904. After a comparison of the substances' half-lives determined by Debierne, Harriet Brooks in 1904, and Otto Hahn and Otto Sackur in 1905, Debierne's chosen name for the new element was retained because it had seniority, despite the contradicting chemical properties he claimed for the element at different times.

Articles published in the 1970s and later suggest that Debierne's results published in 1904 conflict with those reported in 1899 and 1900. Furthermore, the now-known chemistry of actinium precludes its presence as anything other than a minor constituent of Debierne's 1899 and 1900 results; in fact, the chemical properties he reported make it likely that he had, instead, accidentally identified protactinium, which would not be discovered for another fourteen years, only to have it disappear due to its hydrolysis and adsorption onto his laboratory equipment. This has led some authors to advocate that Giesel alone should be credited with the discovery. A less confrontational vision of scientific discovery is proposed by Adloff. He suggests that hindsight criticism of the early publications should be mitigated by the then nascent state of radiochemistry: highlighting the prudence of Debierne's claims in the original papers, he notes that nobody can contend that Debierne's substance did not contain actinium. Debierne, who is now considered by the vast majority of historians as the discoverer, lost interest in the element and left the topic. Giesel, on the other hand, can rightfully be credited with the first preparation of radiochemically pure actinium and with the identification of its atomic number 89.

The name actinium originates from the Ancient Greek aktis, aktinos (ακτίς, ακτίνος), meaning beam or ray. Its symbol Ac is also used in abbreviations of other compounds that have nothing to do with actinium, such as acetyl, acetate and sometimes acetaldehyde.

== Properties ==
Actinium is a soft, silvery-white, radioactive, metallic element. Its estimated shear modulus is similar to that of lead. Owing to its strong radioactivity, actinium glows in the dark with a pale blue light, which originates from the surrounding air ionized by the emitted energetic particles. Actinium has similar chemical properties to lanthanum and other lanthanides, and therefore these elements are difficult to separate when extracting from uranium ores. Solvent extraction and ion chromatography are commonly used for the separation.

The first element of the actinides, actinium, gave the set its name, much as lanthanum had done for the lanthanides. The actinides are much more diverse than the lanthanides and therefore it was not until 1945 that the most significant change to Dmitri Mendeleev's periodic table since the recognition of the lanthanides, the introduction of the actinides, was generally accepted after Glenn T. Seaborg's research on the transuranium elements (although it had been proposed as early as 1892 by British chemist Henry Bassett).

Actinium reacts rapidly with oxygen and moisture in air, forming a white coating of actinium oxide that impedes further oxidation. As with most lanthanides and actinides, actinium exists in the oxidation state +3, and the Ac^{3+} ions are colorless in solutions. The oxidation state +3 originates from the [Rn] 6d^{1}7s^{2} electronic configuration of actinium, with three valence electrons that are easily donated to give the stable closed-shell structure of the noble gas radon. Although the 5f orbitals are unoccupied in an actinium atom, it can be used as a valence orbital in actinium complexes and hence it is generally considered the first 5f element by authors working on it. Ac^{3+} is the largest of all known tripositive ions and its first coordination sphere contains approximately 10.9 ± 0.5 water molecules.

== Chemical compounds ==
Due to actinium's intense radioactivity, only a limited number of actinium compounds are known. These include: AcF_{3}, AcCl_{3}, AcBr_{3}, AcOF, AcOCl, AcOBr, Ac_{2}S_{3}, Ac_{2}O_{3}, AcPO_{4} and Ac(NO_{3})_{3}. They all contain actinium in the oxidation state +3. In particular, the lattice constants of the analogous lanthanum and actinium compounds differ by only a few percent.

Formula	color	symmetry	space group	No	Pearson symbol	a (pm)	b (pm)	c (pm)	Z	density, g/cm^{3}
Ac	silvery	fcc	Fm3̅m	225	cF4	531.1	531.1	531.1	4	10.07
AcH_{2}	unknown	cubic	Fm3̅m	225	cF12	567	567	567	4	8.35
Ac_{2}O_{3}	white	trigonal	P3̅m1	164	hP5	408	408	630	1	9.18
Ac_{2}S_{3}	black	cubic	I4̅3d	220	cI28	778.56	778.56	778.56	4	6.71
AcF_{3}	white	hexagonal	P3̅c1	165	hP24	741	741	755	6	7.88
AcCl_{3}	white	hexagonal	P6_{3}/m	165	hP8	764	764	456	2	4.8
AcBr_{3}	white	hexagonal	P6_{3}/m	165	hP8	764	764	456	2	5.85
AcOF	white	cubic	Fm3̅m			593.1				8.28
AcOCl	white	tetragonal				424	424	707		7.23
AcOBr	white	tetragonal				427	427	740		7.89
AcPO_{4}·0.5H_{2}O	unknown	hexagonal				721	721	664		5.48

Here a, b and c are lattice constants, No is the space group number, and Z is the number of formula units per unit cell. Density was not measured directly but calculated from the lattice parameters.

=== Oxides ===
Actinium oxide (Ac_{2}O_{3}) can be obtained by heating the hydroxide at 500 °C (932 °F) or the oxalate at 1,100 °C (2,010 °F), in vacuum. Its crystal lattice is isotypic with the oxides of most trivalent rare-earth metals.

=== Halides ===
Actinium trifluoride can be produced either in solution or in solid reaction. The former reaction is carried out at room temperature, by adding hydrofluoric acid to a solution containing actinium ions. In the latter method, actinium metal is treated with hydrogen fluoride vapors at 700 °C (1,292 °F) in an all-platinum setup. Treating actinium trifluoride with ammonium hydroxide at 900–1,000 °C (1,650–1,830 °F) yields oxyfluoride AcOF. Whereas lanthanum oxyfluoride can be easily obtained by burning lanthanum trifluoride in air at 800 °C (1,470 °F) for an hour, similar treatment of actinium trifluoride yields no AcOF and only results in melting of the initial product.

AcF_{3} + 2 NH_{3} + H_{2}O → AcOF + 2 NH_{4}F

Actinium trichloride is obtained by reacting actinium hydroxide or oxalate with carbon tetrachloride vapors at temperatures above 960 °C (1,760 °F). Similarly to the oxyfluoride, actinium oxychloride can be prepared by hydrolyzing actinium trichloride with ammonium hydroxide at 1,000 °C (1,830 °F). However, in contrast to the oxyfluoride, the oxychloride could well be synthesized by igniting a solution of actinium trichloride in hydrochloric acid with ammonia.

Reaction of aluminium bromide and actinium oxide yields actinium tribromide:

Ac_{2}O_{3} + 2 AlBr_{3} → 2 AcBr_{3} + Al_{2}O_{3}

and treating it with ammonium hydroxide at 500 °C (932 °F) results in the oxybromide AcOBr.

=== Other compounds ===
Actinium hydride was obtained by reduction of actinium trichloride with potassium at 300 °C (572 °F), and its structure was deduced by analogy with the corresponding LaH_{2} hydride. The source of hydrogen in the reaction was uncertain.

Mixing monosodium phosphate (NaH_{2}PO_{4}) with a solution of actinium in hydrochloric acid yields white-colored actinium phosphate hemihydrate (AcPO_{4}·0.5H_{2}O), and heating actinium oxalate with hydrogen sulfide vapors at 1,400 °C (2,550 °F) for a few minutes results in a black actinium sulfide Ac_{2}S_{3}. It may be produced by acting with a mixture of hydrogen sulfide and carbon disulfide on actinium oxide at 1,000 °C (1,830 °F).

== Isotopes ==
Naturally occurring actinium is principally composed of two radioactive isotopes; ^{227}Ac (from the radioactive family of ^{235}U) and ^{228}Ac (a granddaughter of ^{232}Th). ^{227}Ac decays mainly as a beta emitter with a very small energy, but in 1.38% of cases it emits an alpha particle, so it can readily be identified through alpha spectrometry. Thirty-three radioisotopes have been identified, the most stable being ^{227}Ac with a half-life of 21.772 years, ^{225}Ac with a half-life of 10.0 days and ^{226}Ac with a half-life of 29.37 hours. All remaining radioactive isotopes have half-lives that are less than 10 hours, and the majority of them have half-lives shorter than one minute. The shortest-lived known isotope of actinium is ^{217}Ac (half-life of 69 nanoseconds) which decays through alpha decay. Actinium also has two known meta states. The most significant isotopes for chemistry are ^{225}Ac, ^{227}Ac, and ^{228}Ac.

Purified ^{227}Ac comes into equilibrium with its decay products after about a half-year. It decays according to its 21.772-year half-life, emitting mostly beta (98.62%) and some alpha particles (1.38%); the successive decay products are part of the actinium series. Owing to the low available amounts, low energy of its beta particles (maximum 44.8 keV) and low intensity of alpha radiation, ^{227}Ac is difficult to detect directly by its emission, and it is therefore traced via its decay products. The isotopes of actinium range in atomic weight from 203 Da (^{203}Ac) to 236 Da (^{236}Ac).

Isotope	Production	Decay	Half-life
^{221}Ac	^{232}Th(d,9n)→^{225}Pa(α)→^{221}Ac	α	52 ms
^{222}Ac	^{232}Th(d,8n)→^{226}Pa(α)→^{222}Ac	α	5.0 s
^{223}Ac	^{232}Th(d,7n)→^{227}Pa(α)→^{223}Ac	α	2.1 min
^{224}Ac	^{232}Th(d,6n)→^{228}Pa(α)→^{224}Ac	α	2.78 hours
^{225}Ac	^{232}Th(n,γ)→^{233}Th(β^{−})→^{233}Pa(β^{−})→^{233}U(α)→^{229}Th(α)→^{225}Ra(β^{−})→^{225}Ac	α	10 days
^{226}Ac	^{226}Ra(d,2n)→^{226}Ac	α, β^{−} electron capture	29.37 hours
^{227}Ac	^{235}U(α)→^{231}Th(β^{−})→^{231}Pa(α)→^{227}Ac	α, β^{−}	21.77 years
^{228}Ac	^{232}Th(α)→^{228}Ra(β^{−})→^{228}Ac	β^{−}	6.15 hours
^{229}Ac	^{228}Ra(n,γ)→^{229}Ra(β^{−})→^{229}Ac	β^{−}	62.7 min
^{230}Ac	^{232}Th(d,α)→^{230}Ac	β^{−}	122 s
^{231}Ac	^{232}Th(γ,p)→^{231}Ac	β^{−}	7.5 min
^{232}Ac	^{232}Th(n,p)→^{232}Ac	β^{−}	119 s

== Occurrence and synthesis ==
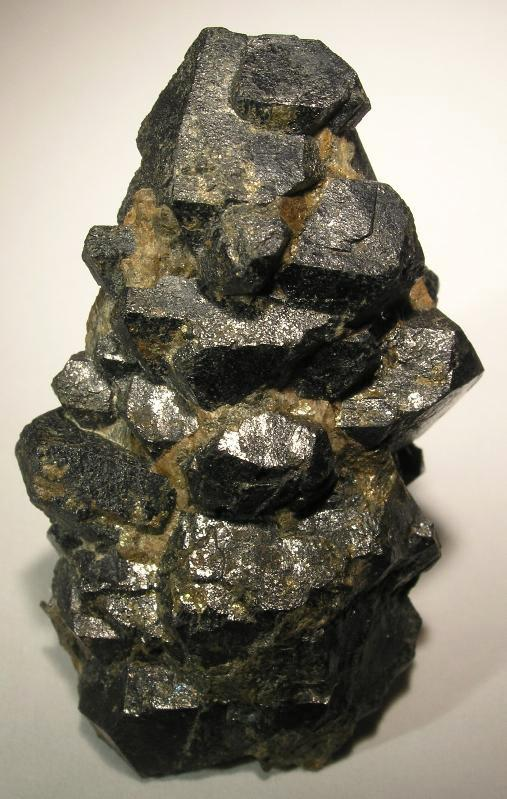
Uraninite ores have elevated concentrations of actinium.

Actinium is found only in traces in uranium ores – one tonne of uranium in ore contains about 0.2 milligrams of ^{227}Ac – and in thorium ores, which contain about 5 nanograms of ^{228}Ac per one tonne of thorium. The actinium isotope ^{227}Ac is a transient member of the uranium-actinium series decay chain, which begins with the parent isotope ^{235}U (or ^{239}Pu) and ends with the stable lead isotope ^{207}Pb. The isotope ^{228}Ac is a transient member of the thorium series decay chain, which begins with the parent isotope ^{232}Th and ends with the stable lead isotope ^{208}Pb. Another actinium isotope (^{225}Ac) is transiently present in the neptunium series decay chain, beginning with ^{237}Np (or ^{233}U) and ending with thallium (^{205}Tl) and near-stable bismuth (^{209}Bi); even though all primordial ^{237}Np has decayed away, it is continuously produced by neutron knock-out reactions on natural ^{238}U.

The low natural concentration and the close similarity of physical and chemical properties to those of lanthanum and other lanthanides, which are always abundant in actinium-bearing ores, render separation of actinium from the ore impractical. The most concentrated actinium sample prepared from raw material consisted of 7 micrograms of ^{227}Ac in less than 0.1 milligrams of La_{2}O_{3}, and complete separation was never achieved. Instead, actinium is prepared, in milligram amounts, by the neutron irradiation of ^{226}Ra in a nuclear reactor.

$$\ce{^{226}_{88}Ra + ^{1}_{0}n -> ^{227}_{88}Ra ->[\beta^-][42.2 \ \ce{min}] ^{227}_{89}Ac}$$

The reaction yield is about 2% of the radium weight. ^{227}Ac can further capture neutrons resulting in small amounts of ^{228}Ac. After the synthesis, actinium is separated from radium and from the products of decay and nuclear fusion, such as thorium, polonium, lead, and bismuth. The extraction can be performed with thenoyltrifluoroacetone-benzene solution from an aqueous solution of the radiation products, and the selectivity to a certain element is achieved by adjusting the pH (to about 6.0 for actinium). An alternative procedure is anion exchange with an appropriate resin in nitric acid, which can result in a separation factor of 1,000,000 for radium and actinium vs. thorium in a two-stage process. Actinium can then be separated from radium, with a ratio of about 100, using a low cross-linking cation exchange resin and nitric acid as eluant.

^{225}Ac was first produced artificially at the Institute for Transuranium Elements (ITU) in Germany using a cyclotron and at St George Hospital in Sydney using a linac in 2000. This rare isotope has potential applications in radiation therapy and is most efficiently produced by bombarding a radium-226 target with 20–30 MeV deuterium ions. This reaction also yields ^{226}Ac which however decays with a half-life of 29 hours and thus does not contaminate ^{225}Ac.

Actinium metal has been prepared by the reduction of actinium fluoride with lithium vapor in vacuum at a temperature between 1,100 and 1,300 °C (2,010 and 2,370 °F). Higher temperatures resulted in evaporation of the product, and lower temperatures led to an incomplete transformation. Lithium was chosen among other alkali metals because its fluoride is the most volatile.

== Applications ==
Owing to its scarcity, high price and radioactivity, ^{227}Ac currently has no significant industrial use, but ^{225}Ac is currently being studied for use in cancer treatments such as targeted alpha therapies. ^{227}Ac is highly radioactive and was therefore studied for use as an active element of radioisotope thermoelectric generators, for example, in spacecraft. The oxide of ^{227}Ac pressed with beryllium is also an efficient neutron source with the activity exceeding that of the standard americium-beryllium and radium-beryllium pairs. In all those applications, ^{227}Ac (a beta source) is merely a progenitor which generates alpha-emitting isotopes upon its decay. Beryllium captures alpha particles and emits neutrons owing to its large cross-section for the (α,n) nuclear reaction:

$$\ce{^{9}_{4}Be + ^{4}_{2}He -> ^{12}_{6}C + ^{1}_{0}n + \gamma}$$

The ^{227}AcBe neutron sources can be applied in a neutron probe – a standard device for measuring the quantity of water present in soil, as well as moisture/density for quality control in highway construction. Such probes are also used in well logging applications, in neutron radiography, tomography, and other radiochemical investigations.

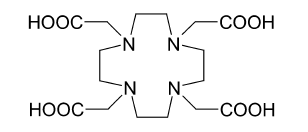
Chemical structure of the DOTA carrier for ^{225}Ac in radiation therapy

^{225}Ac is applied in medicine to produce ^{213}Bi in a reusable generator or can be used alone as an agent for radiation therapy, in particular targeted alpha therapy (TAT). This isotope has a half-life of 10 days, making it much more suitable for radiation therapy than ^{213}Bi (half-life 46 minutes). Additionally, ^{225}Ac decays to nontoxic ^{209}Bi rather than toxic lead, which is the final product in the decay chains of several other candidate isotopes, namely ^{227}Th, ^{228}Th, and ^{230}U. Not only ^{225}Ac itself, but also its daughters, emit alpha particles which kill cancer cells in the body. The major difficulty with the application of ^{225}Ac was that intravenous injection of simple actinium complexes resulted in their accumulation in the bones and liver for a period of tens of years. As a result, after the cancer cells were quickly killed by alpha particles from ^{225}Ac, the radiation from the actinium and its daughters might induce new mutations. To solve this problem, ^{225}Ac was bound to a chelating agent, such as citrate, ethylenediaminetetraacetic acid (EDTA) or diethylene triamine pentaacetic acid (DTPA). This reduced actinium accumulation in the bones, but the excretion from the body remained slow. Much better results were obtained with such chelating agents as HEHA (1,4,7,10,13,16-hexaazacyclohexadecane-N,N′,N″,N‴,N‴′,N‴″-hexaacetic acid) or DOTA (1,4,7,10-tetraazacyclododecane-1,4,7,10-tetraacetic acid) coupled to trastuzumab, a monoclonal antibody that interferes with the HER2/neu receptor. The latter delivery combination was tested on mice and proved to be effective against leukemia, lymphoma, breast, ovarian, neuroblastoma and prostate cancers.

The medium half-life of ^{227}Ac (21.77 years) makes it a very convenient radioactive isotope in modeling the slow vertical mixing of oceanic waters. The associated processes cannot be studied with the required accuracy by direct measurements of current velocities (of the order 50 meters per year). However, evaluation of the concentration depth profiles for different isotopes allows estimating the mixing rates. The physics behind this method is as follows: oceanic waters contain homogeneously dispersed ^{235}U. Its decay product, ^{231}Pa, gradually precipitates to the bottom, so that its concentration first increases with depth and then stays nearly constant. ^{231}Pa decays to ^{227}Ac; however, the concentration of the latter isotope does not follow the ^{231}Pa depth profile, but instead increases toward the sea bottom. This occurs because of the mixing processes, which raise some additional ^{227}Ac from the sea bottom. Thus, analysis of both ^{231}Pa and ^{227}Ac depth profiles allows researchers to model the mixing behavior.

There are theoretical predictions that AcH_{x} hydrides (in this case with very high pressure) are a candidate for a near room-temperature superconductor as they have T_{c} significantly higher than H_{3}S, possibly near 250 K.

== Precautions ==
^{227}Ac is highly radioactive and experiments with it are carried out in a specially designed laboratory equipped with a tight glove box. When actinium trichloride is administered intravenously to rats, about 33% of actinium is deposited into the bones and 50% into the liver. Its toxicity is comparable to, but slightly lower than, that of americium and plutonium. For trace quantities, fume hoods with good aeration suffice; for gram amounts, hot cells with shielding from the intense gamma radiation emitted by ^{227}Ac are necessary.

== See also ==
- Actinium series

== Bibliography ==
- Meyer, Gerd; Morss, Lester R. (1991). Synthesis of lanthanide and actinide compounds. Springer. ISBN 0-7923-1018-7.
