= Actinium(III) chloride =

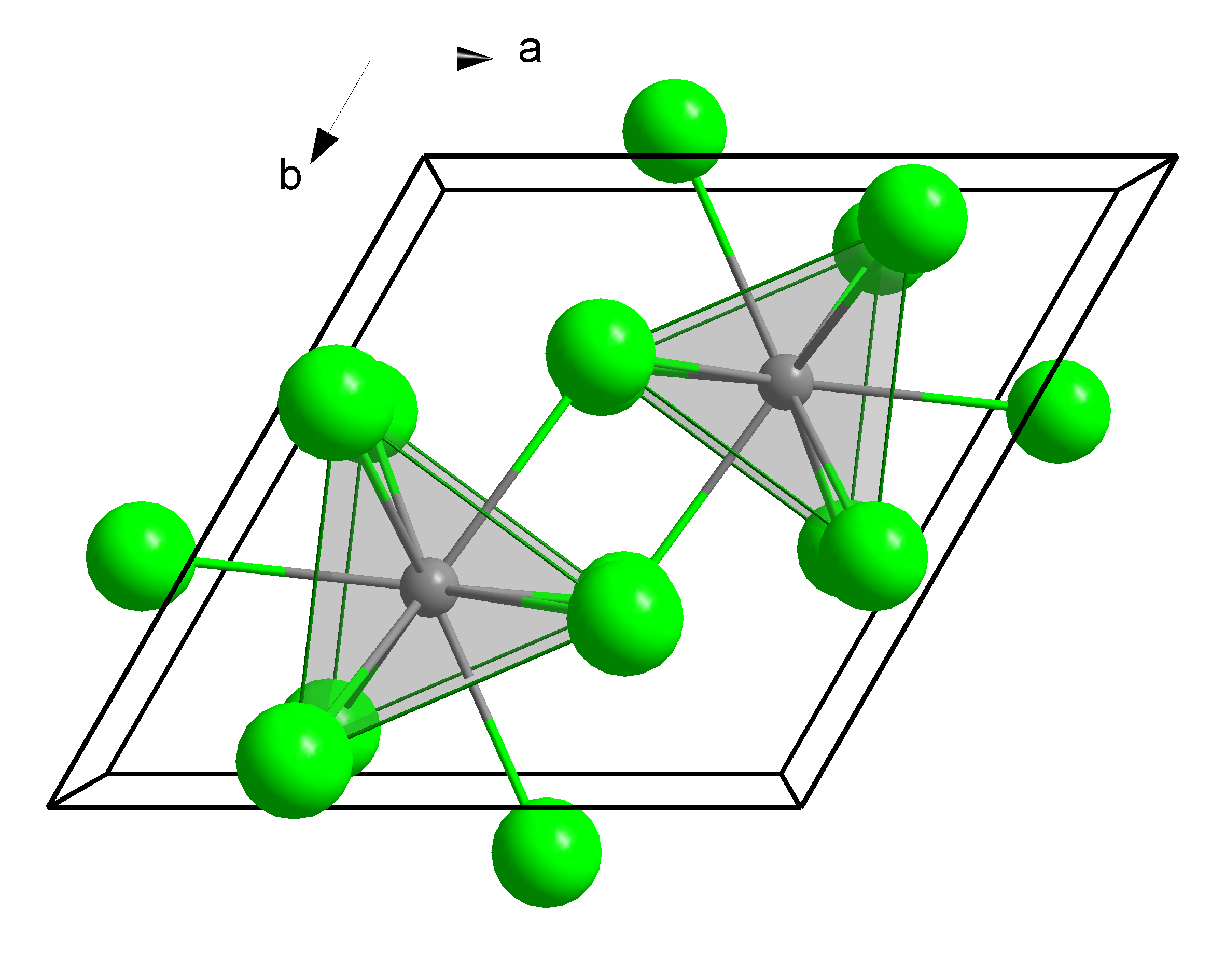

Names
- Other names Actinium trichloride Actinium chloride

Identifiers
CAS Number	22986-54-5
3D model (JSmol)	Interactive image
ChemSpider	29322259
PubChem CID	86218203
- InChI: InChI=1S/Ac.3ClH/h;3*1H/p-3 Key: WHQPIOWKCXBORU-UHFFFAOYSA-K
- SMILES: [Cl-].[Cl-].[Cl-].[Ac]

Properties
Chemical formula	AcCl_{3}
Molar mass	333.378 g/mol
Appearance	White crystalline solid
Density	4.81 g/cm^{3}
Melting point	1,051 °C (1,924 °F; 1,324 K) (sublimes)
- Except where otherwise noted, data are given for materials in their standard state (at 25 °C [77 °F], 100 kPa). Infobox references

Actinium(III) chloride is a chemical compound containing the rare radioactive element actinium. This salt has the formula AcCl_{3}. Molecular weight of the compound is 333.378 g/mol.

== Synthesis ==
Actinium(III) chloride is made by reacting actinium hydroxide with carbon tetrachloride.

4 Ac(OH)_{3} + 3 CCl_{4} → 4AcCl_{3} + 3CO_{2} + 6H_{2}O
