= Actinium(III) oxide =

- Unit cell, ball and stick model of actinium(III) oxide

Names
- IUPAC name Actinium(III) oxide
- Systematic IUPAC name Actinium(3+) oxide
- Other names Actinium sesquioxide

Identifiers
CAS Number	12002-61-8
3D model (JSmol)	Interactive image
ChemSpider	10700920
ECHA InfoCard	100.031.275
EC Number	234-417-6
PubChem CID	21946271
CompTox Dashboard (EPA)	DTXSID601029728
- InChI: InChI=1S/2Ac.3O/q;;3*-2 Key: MAPOZTWVBAGEOP-UHFFFAOYSA-N
- SMILES: [O--].[O--].[O--].[Ac+3].[Ac+3]

Properties
Chemical formula	Ac_{2}O_{3}
Molar mass	502.053 g/mol
Appearance	white
Melting point	2,327 °C (4,221 °F; 2,600 K)

Structure
Crystal structure	Trigonal, hP5
Space group	P3̅m1, No. 164
Lattice constant	a = 408 pm, c = 630 pm

Related compounds
Other cations	Lanthanum(III) oxide
- Except where otherwise noted, data are given for materials in their standard state (at 25 °C [77 °F], 100 kPa). verify (what is ?) Infobox references

Actinium(III) oxide is a chemical compound containing the rare radioactive element actinium. It has the molecular formula Ac_{2}O_{3}. It is similar to its corresponding lanthanum compound, lanthanum(III) oxide, and contains actinium in the oxidation state +3. Actinium oxide is not to be confused with Ac_{2}O (acetic anhydride), where Ac is an abbreviation for acetyl instead of the symbol of the element actinium.
