= Erbium compounds =

Chemical compounds containing erbium

Erbium compounds are compounds containing the chemical element erbium (Er). As with most of the later lanthanides, the chemistry of erbium is dominated by the +3 oxidation state, corresponding to the Er^{3+} ion with a 4f^{11} electron configuration. Erbium(III) compounds are generally highly ionic, and many hydrated salts and coordination compounds are pink or rose-coloured owing to characteristic f–f electronic transitions. Lower oxidation states are much less common, although +2, +1 and formally 0 oxidation states have been reported in specialized inorganic and organometallic systems.

A wide range of binary erbium compounds are known. These include erbium(III) oxide and other chalcogenides, the four trihalides ErF_{3}, ErCl_{3}, ErBr_{3} and ErI_{3}, hydrides, borides, carbides, silicides and pnictides. Many of these compounds display magnetic ordering at low temperatures as a result of the localized 4f electrons of Er^{3+}. Erbium also forms numerous hydrated oxoacid salts and coordination compounds, as well as organometallic complexes containing cyclopentadienyl, alkyl and aryl ligands.

The characteristic optical transitions of Er^{3+}, particularly those in the near-infrared region, make erbium compounds important in optical and photonic materials. Erbium-containing fluorides, oxides and glasses are widely studied for infrared emission and upconversion luminescence, while erbium silicides and nitrides have also attracted interest for electronic, magnetic and semiconductor applications.

== Properties of erbium compounds ==
Formula	Appearance	Crystal system	Space group	No.	a (nm)	b (nm)	c (nm)	Density (g/cm^{3})
Er_{2}O_{3}	pale pink	cubic	Ia3̅	206	1.05376			8.69
ErF_{3}	pink	orthorhombic	Pnma	62	0.6320	0.6822	0.4385	7.81
ErCl_{3}	violet	monoclinic	C2/m	12	0.6804	1.17456	0.63187	3.79
ErBr_{3}	violet	trigonal	R3̅	148	0.7005	0.7005	1.889	4.93
ErH_{2}		cubic	Fm3̅m	225	0.51287			
ErB_{4}		tetragonal	P4/mbm	127	0.70705		0.399710	
ErC_{2}		tetragonal	I4/mmm	139	0.3622		0.6106	
ErN		cubic	Fm3̅m	225	0.4839			10.63
ErP		cubic	Fm3̅m	225	0.5595			
ErAs		cubic	Fm3̅m	225	0.5732			
ErSb		cubic	Fm3̅m	225	0.6106			
ErBi		cubic	Fm3̅m	225	0.6206			
Er_{2}Se_{3}		orthorhombic	Fddd	70	0.8085	1.1346	2.4140	
Er_{2}Te_{3}		orthorhombic	Fddd	70	1.2134	0.8579	2.5737	

== Chalcogenides ==
=== Oxides ===
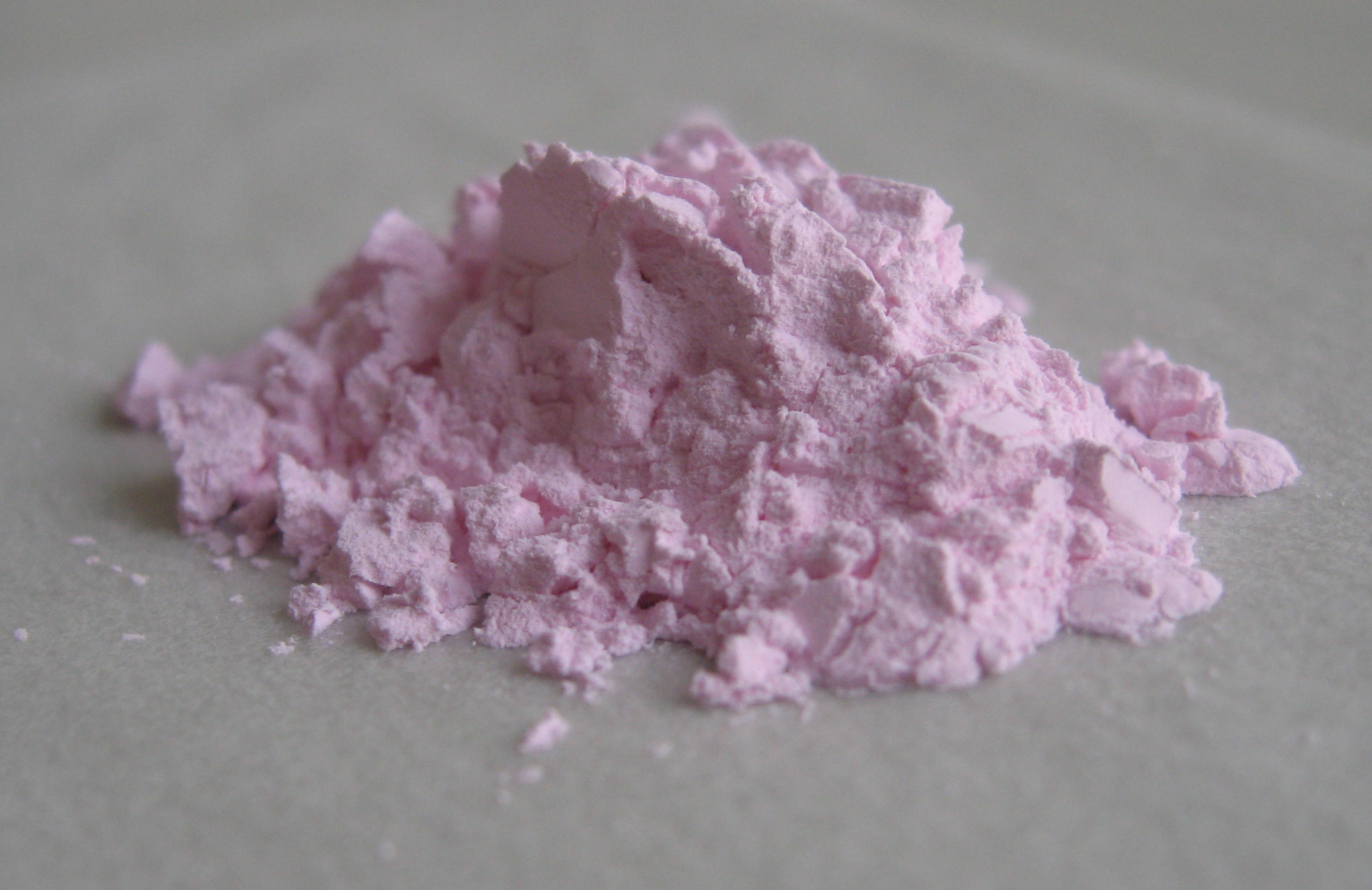
Erbium(III) oxide, a compound of erbium

Erbium(III) oxide (Er_{2}O_{3}), also known as erbia, is the principal oxide of erbium. It was first isolated in impure form by Carl Gustaf Mosander in 1843, and was obtained in pure form in 1905 by Georges Urbain and Charles James. At ambient conditions it adopts the cubic bixbyite structure characteristic of many rare-earth sesquioxides, in which Er^{3+} occupies two crystallographically distinct six-coordinate sites. Other polymorphs of Er_{2}O_{3} can be produced under appropriate conditions.

Erbium(III) oxide can be prepared by burning erbium metal in oxygen, and is also produced by thermal decomposition of several erbium salts. It is a pale pink solid that is insoluble in water but dissolves in mineral acids.

=== Other chalcogenides ===
Several sulfides of erbium are known. Erbium(III) sulfide, Er_{2}S_{3}, occurs in several structural modifications. The δ modification is monoclinic, with space group P2_{1}/m, and is isostructural with δ-Ho_{2}S_{3}. Its structure contains erbium atoms in several different sulfur coordination environments. A second modification, F-Er_{2}S_{3}, is monoclinic and can be obtained by chemical vapour transport in the presence of niobium and chlorine. In this structure the erbium atoms have coordination numbers of six, seven and eight. The monosulfide ErS is also known and adopts the sodium chloride structure. Nanocrystals of ErS have been observed to form from Er_{2}S_{3} under electron-beam irradiation.

The erbium–selenium system contains several binary phases, including ErSe, Er_{2}Se_{3} and ErSe_{2}. ErSe adopts the cubic sodium chloride structure. Er_{2}Se_{3} crystallizes in an orthorhombic structure of the Sc_{2}S_{3} type, space group Fddd, which may be regarded as a vacancy-ordered derivative of the sodium chloride structure. In this structure both crystallographically independent erbium sites are approximately octahedrally coordinated by selenium. ErSe_{2} has more than one structural modification and undergoes a phase transition on heating. Intermediate compositions also occur between Er_{2}Se_{3} and more erbium-rich phases.

Erbium(III) telluride, Er_{2}Te_{3}, can be prepared by direct reaction of erbium with tellurium or by chemical vapour transport using erbium(III) chloride as the transport agent. It crystallizes in the orthorhombic Sc_{2}S_{3} structure type, space group Fddd. It is a semiconductor with a measured band gap of 0.77(5) eV and is paramagnetic between 5 and 300 K.

== Halides ==
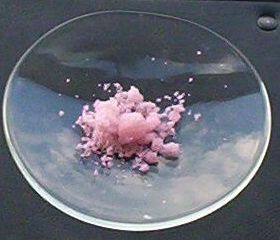
Erbium(III) chloride hydrate

Erbium forms the four trihalides ErF_{3}, ErCl_{3}, ErBr_{3} and ErI_{3}. They can be obtained by direct reaction of erbium metal with the corresponding halogen.

Erbium(III) fluoride is a pink solid. It can be prepared by precipitation from an aqueous erbium(III) salt with a fluoride source; reaction of erbium(III) nitrate with ammonium fluoride, for example, has been used to prepare ErF_{3} micro- and nanostructures. At ambient pressure it crystallizes in the orthorhombic β-YF_{3} structure, space group Pnma, in which the erbium atoms are nine-coordinate. At approximately 9.8 GPa it undergoes a reversible transformation to a trigonal LaF_{3}-type structure. ErF_{3} exhibits characteristic Er^{3+} luminescence and has consequently been studied in infrared and upconversion optical materials.

Erbium(III) chloride, ErCl_{3}, is a violet solid. Anhydrous ErCl_{3} can be prepared from erbium(III) oxide by the ammonium chloride route. Heating the oxide with ammonium chloride first produces an ammonium chloridoerbium intermediate, which decomposes on further heating under vacuum to give the anhydrous chloride. Anhydrous ErCl_{3} adopts the monoclinic AlCl_{3} structure type.

The hexahydrate ErCl_{3}·6H_{2}O is also monoclinic. In its crystal structure the erbium centre is eight-coordinate, with six water molecules and two chloride ions forming the first coordination sphere, while a further chloride ion remains outside it.

Erbium(III) bromide and erbium(III) iodide are likewise violet trihalides. Unlike ErCl_{3}, which has an AlCl_{3}-type arrangement, ErBr_{3} and ErI_{3} crystallize in closely related layered structures of the BiI_{3} type. In these compounds the Er^{3+} ions form two-dimensional honeycomb layers separated by halide ions.

The three heavier trihalides also display related low-temperature magnetic behaviour. ErCl_{3} develops three-dimensional antiferromagnetic order below about 350 mK, whereas ErBr_{3} and ErI_{3} show long-range two-dimensional magnetic order between approximately 280 and 400 mK, followed by only short-range three-dimensional correlations at lower temperatures. These differences arise from the different stacking of the erbium honeycomb layers in their crystal structures.

== Hydrides ==
Erbium forms two principal binary hydrides, erbium dihydride (ErH_{2}) and erbium trihydride (ErH_{3}). At low hydrogen concentrations, hydrogen forms a solid solution in metallic erbium while retaining the hexagonal close-packed structure of the metal. With increasing hydrogen content, a cubic dihydride phase appears, followed at still higher concentrations by the trihydride phase.

ErH_{2} adopts the cubic calcium fluoride structure, in which the erbium atoms form a face-centered cubic sublattice and hydrogen occupies the tetrahedral interstitial sites. It is metallic, and its electronic structure differs substantially from that of elemental erbium because hybridized erbium–hydrogen bands occur below the Fermi level.

At higher hydrogen concentrations the cubic dihydride coexists with a hydrogen-richer phase until an H/Er ratio of about 2.7, above which the trihydride phase predominates. ErH_{3} has a hexagonal erbium sublattice and adopts a structure related to the HoD_{3} type, with hydrogen occupying several kinds of interstitial site. The transition from ErH_{2} to ErH_{3} is accompanied by a metal–insulator transition, a characteristic feature of several rare-earth hydride systems.

Under pressure, erbium trihydride undergoes a transformation from its ambient-pressure hexagonal structure to a cubic phase. On heating, hydrogen-rich ErH_{3} decomposes through progressively hydrogen-poorer phases, passing through the dihydride region before returning to metallic erbium.

== Borides ==
Several borides of erbium are known, including ErB_{2}, ErB_{4}, ErB_{12} and the boron-rich compound ErB_{66}. The existence and stability of erbium hexaboride, ErB_{6}, have been questioned because of difficulties reproducing earlier syntheses. However, in 2012, single-crystalline ErB_{6} nanowires were reported among the products of palladium-nanoparticle-assisted chemical vapour deposition, together with ErB_{4} nanoplatelets. Transmission electron microscopy and electron diffraction identified cubic and tetragonal structures for the nanowires and nanoplatelets, respectively.

Erbium diboride (ErB_{2}) crystallizes in a hexagonal structure. Single crystals have been grown from molten erbium-rich flux at temperatures around 1750 °C. It is a metallic magnetic compound and exhibits easy-plane ferromagnetic ordering at low temperatures.

Erbium tetraboride (ErB_{4}) adopts the tetragonal UB_{4} structure type, space group P4/mbm. Like other rare-earth tetraborides, its structure contains a two-dimensional network of rare-earth atoms interspersed with boron units. ErB_{4} is metallic and orders antiferromagnetically below approximately 15–16 K. It is strongly magnetically anisotropic, with the easy axis parallel to the crystallographic c axis; increasing magnetic field produces successive magnetic transitions before a field-polarized state is reached.

Erbium dodecaboride (ErB_{12}) crystallizes in the cubic UB_{12} structure type, space group Fm3̅m. In this structure the erbium atoms form an fcc sublattice within a three-dimensional boron framework built from B_{12} clusters. It is a metallic antiferromagnet with a Néel temperature of about 6.6–6.7 K and exhibits a complex magnetic phase diagram and strong anisotropy in its magnetotransport properties.

The boron-rich compound ErB_{66} crystallizes in the cubic space group Fm3̅c, with a lattice parameter of a = 2.3408(3) nm. Its boron framework contains B_{12} icosahedra grouped into larger supericosahedral units, with erbium atoms located in cavities within the framework. Electrical resistivity measurements between 300 and 1000 K are consistent with variable-range hopping conduction. The Seebeck coefficient is approximately 700 μV/K near room temperature and decreases markedly with increasing temperature.

== Carbides and silicides ==
Erbium forms several binary compounds with carbon and silicon. The best-characterized carbide is erbium dicarbide, ErC_{2}, while the erbium–silicon system contains a substantially larger number of stable phases.

Erbium dicarbide (ErC_{2}) crystallizes at room temperature in a tetragonal structure, space group I4/mmm. Its structure contains discrete C_{2} units, and neutron diffraction measurements give a C–C distance of approximately 1.275 Å, consistent with substantial multiple-bond character. ErC_{2} can be prepared by arc melting the constituent elements. Carbon-coated nanoparticles containing ErC_{2} have also been produced by arc discharge and have been investigated for their magnetocaloric and microwave-absorption behaviour.

The erbium–silicon system contains at least five established binary silicides: Er_{5}Si_{3}, Er_{5}Si_{4}, ErSi_{1-x}, ErSi and the silicon-deficient disilicide ErSi_{2-δ}. ErSi_{2-δ} is dimorphous, and the various silicides exhibit metallic electrical conductivity.

The most extensively studied erbium silicide is ErSi_{2-δ}, commonly referred to as erbium disilicide. It contains a substantial concentration of silicon vacancies rather than being perfectly stoichiometric ErSi_{2}. Epitaxial films can be produced on silicon by co-deposition of erbium and silicon followed by solid-phase epitaxy. Such films are metallic, with room-temperature resistivities of approximately 35 μΩ cm, and show anomalies in their electrical transport at low temperature associated with magnetic ordering of the erbium atoms.

In epitaxial ErSi_{2-δ} grown on Si(111), the structure consists of alternating erbium and silicon layers. Ordering of silicon vacancies produces a reconstructed surface and interface structure, with the vacancies helping to accommodate the lattice mismatch between the silicide and the silicon substrate. Erbium disilicide has consequently been studied extensively as a contact material to silicon: silicide formation can occur at comparatively low temperatures, and Er–Si contacts form characteristic Schottky barriers on both n- and p-type silicon.

== Pnictides ==
Erbium forms binary compounds with the pnictogens nitrogen, phosphorus, arsenic, antimony and bismuth. The monopnictides ErN, ErP, ErAs, ErSb and ErBi adopt the cubic sodium chloride structure, as is common among the heavier rare-earth monopnictides. Erbium nitride (ErN) is a semiconducting rare-earth nitride with magnetic and optical properties. It crystallizes in the face-centered cubic sodium chloride structure, with a lattice constant of approximately 4.84–4.85 Å. It can be prepared by heating erbium metal in nitrogen and has also been grown as crystals by physical vapour transport at high temperatures. ErN readily oxidizes on exposure to air, forming Er_{2}O_{3} at the surface. Its electronic structure has been investigated because of potential applications of rare-earth nitrides in spintronic and thermoelectric materials.

Erbium phosphide (ErP) can be formed by direct reaction of erbium and phosphorus. It crystallizes in the cubic sodium chloride structure, space group Fm3̅m. ErP, together with ErN and ErAs, has been studied for its pressure-dependent electronic and magnetic properties; calculations indicate a transition from the sodium chloride structure to a caesium chloride-type structure under sufficiently high pressure.

Erbium arsenide (ErAs) also adopts the sodium chloride structure and is a semimetal. Its electronic properties are strongly affected by the localized 4f electrons of erbium.

The erbium–antimony system contains several binary compounds. In addition to the monopnictide erbium antimonide (ErSb), the phases Er_{5}Sb_{3} and ErSb_{2} are known. Er_{5}Sb_{3} occurs in two structural modifications: a low-temperature hexagonal form of the Mn_{5}Si_{3} type and a high-temperature orthorhombic form of the β-Yb_{5}Sb_{3} type.

== Other compounds ==
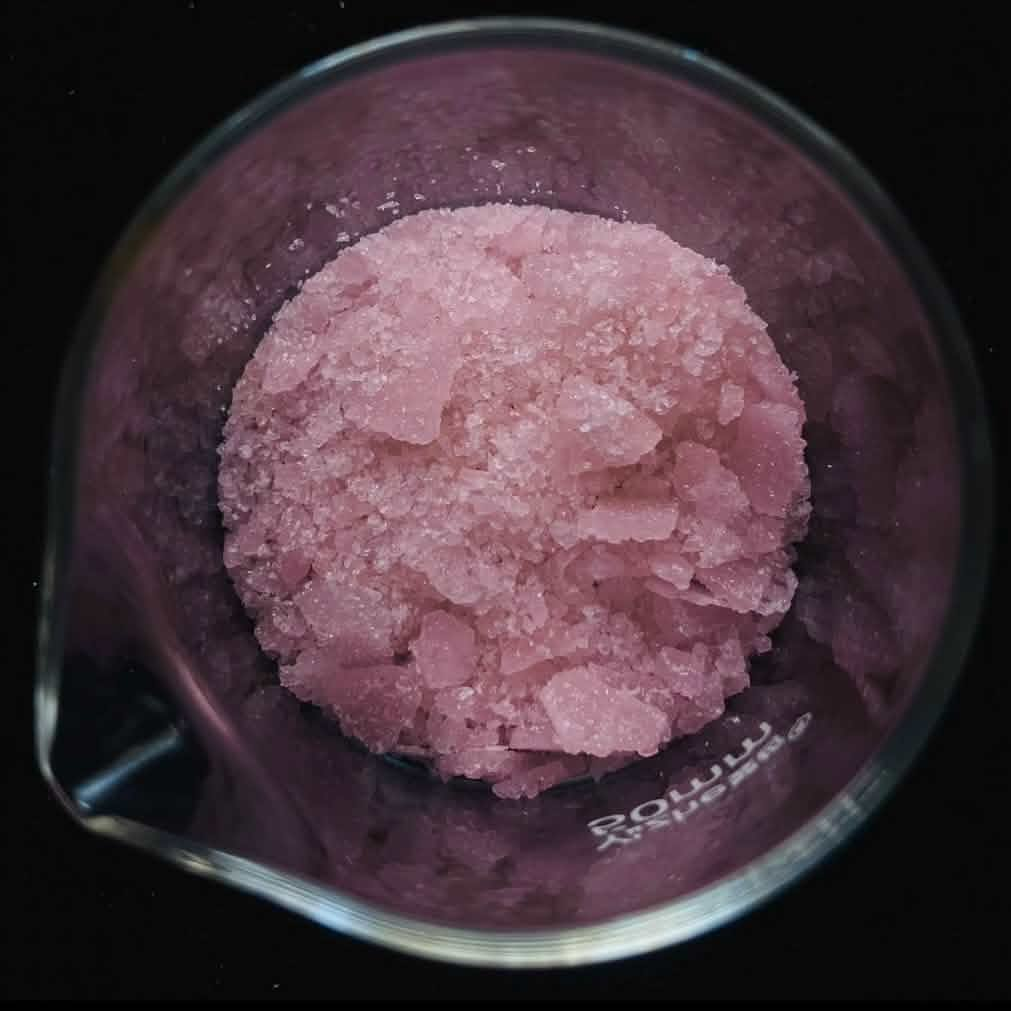
Erbium(III) sulfate octahydrate crystals

Erbium(III) hydroxide, Er(OH)_{3}, is a pink solid. On heating it dehydrates through an oxyhydroxide phase, ErOOH, and ultimately forms erbium(III) oxide, Er_{2}O_{3}. Erbium oxyhydroxide can also be obtained together with erbium oxide by precipitation from aqueous solution.

Erbium(III) nitrate, Er(NO_{3})_{3}, forms pink, water-soluble hydrates. The pentahydrate Er(NO_{3})_{3}·5H_{2}O has been structurally characterized; it is more accurately described as [Er(H_{2}O)_{4}(NO_{3})_{3}]·H_{2}O, with four water molecules and three bidentate nitrate ions directly coordinated to Er^{3+}, and one additional lattice water molecule. Erbium nitrate salts are commonly used as soluble precursors for the preparation of erbium-containing oxides and coordination compounds.

Erbium(III) sulfate, Er_{2}(SO_{4})_{3}, forms hydrated and anhydrous phases. Anhydrous Er_{2}(SO_{4})_{3} crystallizes in the orthorhombic space group Pbcn. Several erbium hydrogensulfates are also known, including two polymorphs of Er(HSO_{4})_{3} and the mixed sulfate–hydrogensulfate Er(SO_{4})(HSO_{4}). The different hydrogensulfate phases can be obtained under differing sulfuric-acid concentrations and temperatures.

Erbium(III) oxalate forms a hexahydrate, Er_{2}(C_{2}O_{4})_{3}·6H_{2}O. On heating, it loses water stepwise between about 90 and 370 °C to give an anhydrous oxalate. Further decomposition produces carbonate and oxycarbonate intermediates, including Er_{2}O_{2}CO_{3}, before crystalline Er_{2}O_{3} is formed near 600 °C. The overall decomposition pathway is similar in air and nitrogen, although the crystallinity of the resulting oxide increases with further heating.

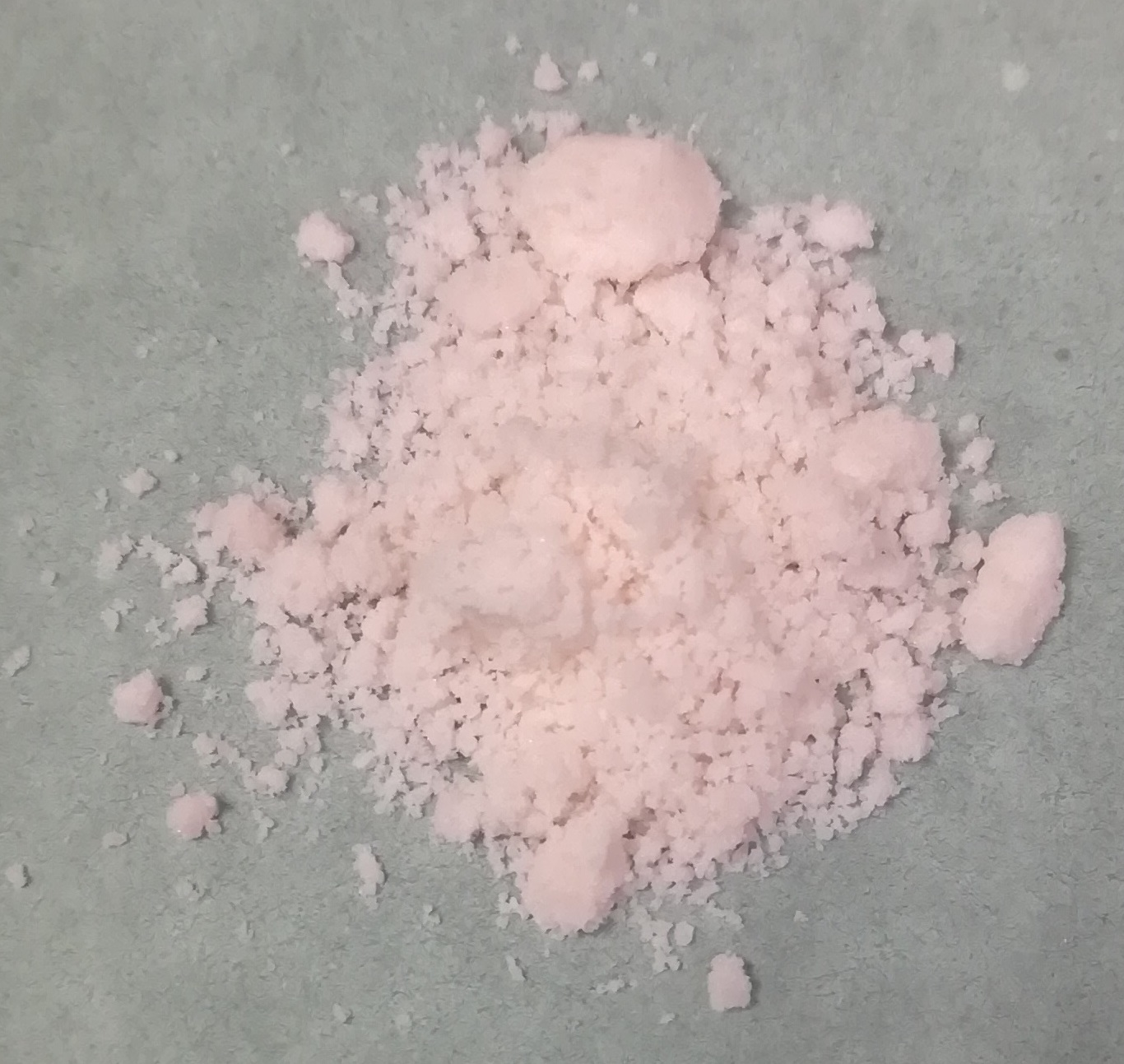
Erbium(III) acetate tetrahydrate powder

Erbium(III) acetate, Er(CH_{3}COO)_{3}, is a light pink solid and forms a tetrahydrate. The tetrahydrate begins to lose its water of crystallization at about 90 °C:

Er(CH_{3}COO)_{3}·4H_{2}O → Er(CH_{3}COO)_{3} + 4 H_{2}O

Further heating causes stepwise decomposition of the acetate groups. At about 310 °C, ketene is evolved:

Er(CH_{3}COO)_{3} → Er(OH)(CH_{3}COO)_{2} + CH_{2}=C=O

The resulting basic acetate loses acetic acid on further heating and passes through oxyacetate and oxycarbonate intermediates, including Er_{2}O_{2}CO_{3}, before forming Er_{2}O_{3} at approximately 590 °C. Erbium acetate has also been used as a precursor in the preparation of erbium-containing optical materials.

== Organoerbium compounds ==
Organoerbium chemistry is dominated by Er^{3+}, and the Er–C bonds in alkyl and aryl complexes are highly polar and reactive, as is typical for the heavier lanthanides. Such compounds are generally air- and moisture-sensitive, and their bonding is largely ionic with little π backbonding.

A common class of organoerbium compounds contains cyclopentadienyl ligands. Tris(cyclopentadienyl)erbium, Er(C_{5}H_{5})_{3}, is a well-established volatile organometallic compound and has been used as a starting material for other erbium complexes. Reaction of Er(C_{5}H_{5})_{3} with substituted pyrazoles can replace the cyclopentadienyl ligands and form tris(pyrazolato)erbium complexes containing additional neutral donor ligands. Some of these complexes sublime without decomposition and have therefore been investigated as molecular precursors for chemical-vapour deposition of erbium-containing materials.

Erbium also forms σ-bonded alkyl complexes. For example, reaction of an erbium β-diketiminato chloride complex with trimethylsilylmethyl lithium gives first a mixed chloro–alkyl dimer and, with excess reagent, the four-coordinate dialkyl complex Er(L)(CH_{2}SiMe_{3})_{2}, where L is a bulky β-diketiminato ligand. These low-coordinate compounds illustrate the use of bulky ligands to stabilize otherwise highly reactive Er–C bonds.

Low-valent organoerbium chemistry is much less extensive, but erbium has also been studied in metal–arene complexes prepared by metal-vapour methods. Zero-valent lanthanide bis(arene) sandwich complexes of the general form Ln(arene)_{2} established that formally zero oxidation states can be stabilized for many lanthanides under highly reducing conditions. Such species are highly unusual compared with conventional Er^{3+} organometallic compounds and are stabilized by strong interaction with bulky aromatic ligands.

== Applications ==
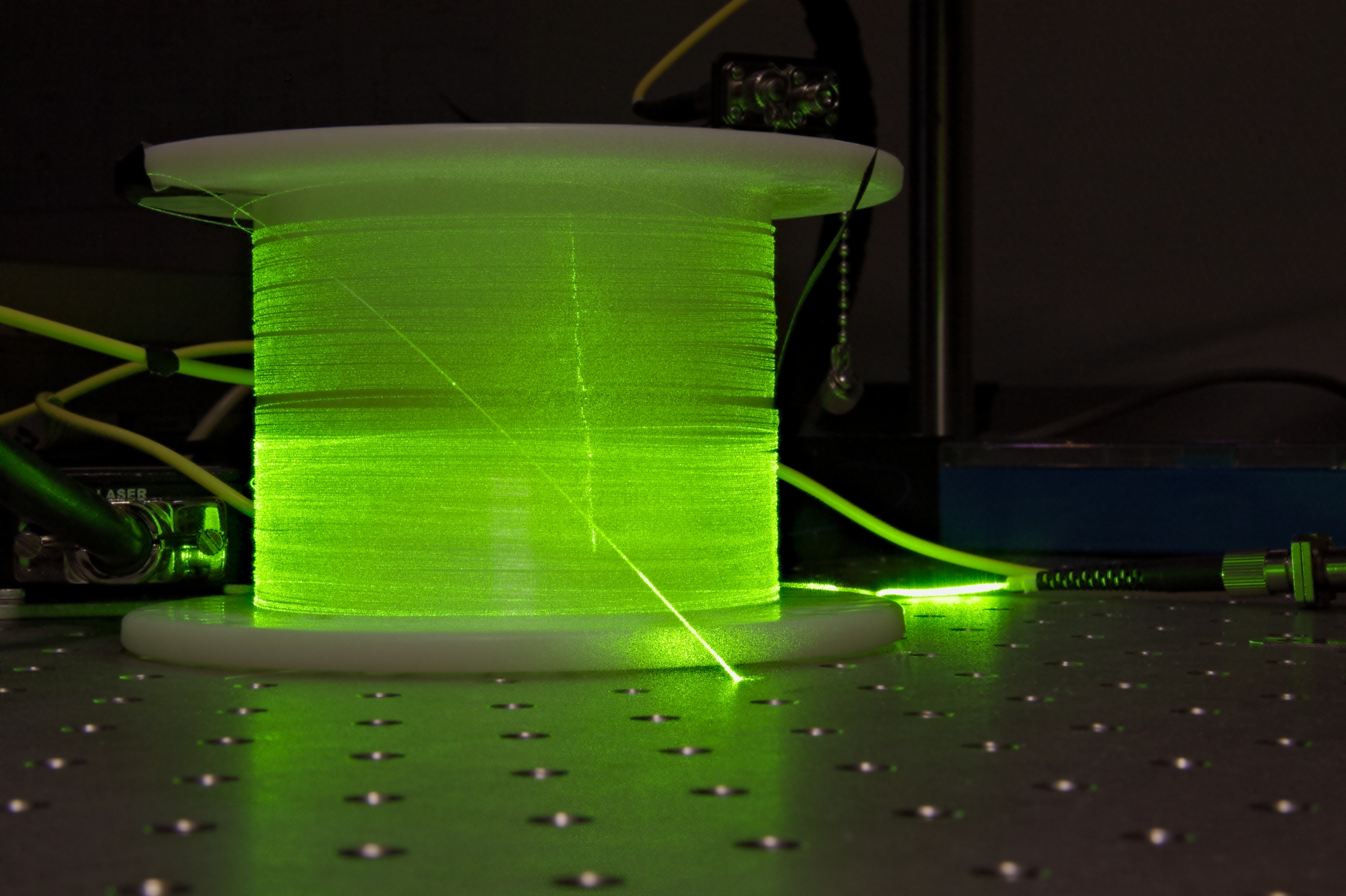
Erbium-doped optical fibre illuminated with green laser light

The best-known applications of erbium compounds arise from the optical properties of Er^{3+}. In glass and crystalline hosts, Er^{3+} exhibits an important transition near 1.55 μm, within the low-loss telecommunications window of silica optical fibre. Erbium-doped fibres are consequently used as gain media in erbium-doped fiber amplifiers and fibre lasers. They are commonly pumped near 980 or 1480 nm and can directly amplify optical signals in the 1.5 μm region without conversion to an electrical signal. These properties have made erbium-doped materials important in optical telecommunications and in tunable and narrow-linewidth fibre laser systems.

Er^{3+} is also widely used as an active ion in solid-state lasers. One important example is erbium-doped yttrium aluminium garnet (Er:YAG), which emits strongly near 2.94 μm. Radiation at this wavelength is strongly absorbed by water, making Er:YAG lasers useful for the ablation of water-rich biological tissues. In dentistry, Er:YAG lasers have been used for procedures involving enamel, dentin and other hard dental tissues.

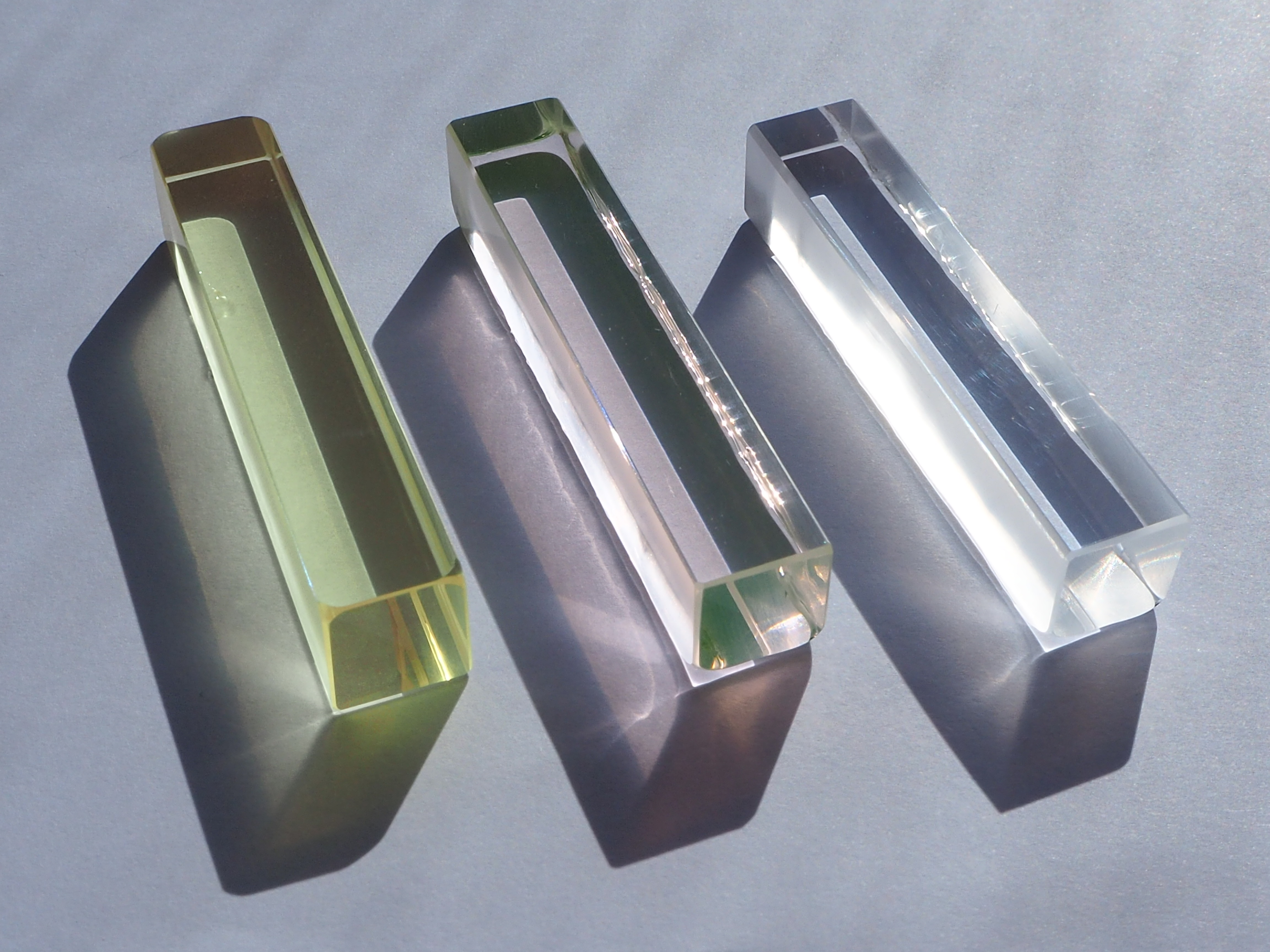
ZBLAN glass samples doped with praseodymium (left), erbium (centre), and undoped (right)

Erbium-containing fluorides, glasses and nanocrystalline materials are extensively studied for upconversion luminescence. In such materials, Er^{3+} can absorb two or more lower-energy photons, often with sensitization by Yb^{3+}, and emit visible light. Fluoride hosts are particularly effective because of their relatively low phonon energies, which reduce non-radiative relaxation. Erbium-doped upconversion materials have been investigated for optical thermometry, imaging, displays, solar-energy conversion and anti-counterfeiting technologies.

Some erbium compounds have also been studied for electronic applications. In particular, erbium silicides form comparatively low Schottky barrier contacts to n-type silicon and have therefore been investigated as contact materials for silicon-based electronic devices. Erbium nitride and related rare-earth nitrides have likewise attracted research interest because of their combination of semiconducting and magnetic properties, including possible spintronic and thermoelectric applications.

Erbium(III) oxide has traditionally been used as a pink colorant in glass, ceramics and enamel. Erbium-containing glasses can also absorb selected visible and infrared wavelengths, and have been used in specialised optical filters and protective glasses.

== See also ==
- Holmium compounds
- Thulium compounds
- Ytterbium compounds
