= Erbium phosphide =

Erbium compound

Names
- Other names Phosphanylidyneerbium, erbium monophosphide

Identifiers
CAS Number	12218-47-2
3D model (JSmol)	Interactive image
ChemSpider	74864
EC Number	235-403-2
PubChem CID	82973
UNII	U5TKH5WM5L
CompTox Dashboard (EPA)	DTXSID701314322
- InChI: InChI=1S/Er.P Key: AGXKTYMXNZEEHT-UHFFFAOYSA-N
- SMILES: [Er]#P

Properties
Chemical formula	ErP
Molar mass	198.23
Appearance	Crystals
Density	7.44 g/cm^{3}

Structure
Crystal structure	Cubic

Related compounds
Other anions	Erbium nitride Erbium arsenide Erbium antimonide Erbium bismuthide
Other cations	Holmium phosphide Thulium phosphide
- Except where otherwise noted, data are given for materials in their standard state (at 25 °C [77 °F], 100 kPa). Infobox references

Erbium phosphide is a binary inorganic compound of erbium and phosphorus with the chemical formula ErP.

== Synthesis ==
Erbium phosphide can be formed by the reaction of erbium and phosphorus:

4 Er + P_{4} → 4 ErP

== Physical properties ==
ErP forms crystals of a cubic system, space group Fm3m.
