= Erbium arsenate =

Names
- Other names Erbium(III) arsenate

Identifiers
CAS Number	28548-44-9
3D model (JSmol)	Interactive image
PubChem CID	173858263
- InChI: InChI=1S/AsH3O4.Er/c2-1(3,4)5;/h(H3,2,3,4,5);/q;+3/p-3 Key: KZSHQWZJWFJWCM-UHFFFAOYSA-K
- SMILES: [O-][As](=O)([O-])[O-].[Er+3]

Properties
Chemical formula	ErAsO_{4}
Molar mass	306.18 g/mol
Appearance	Very pale pink crystalline solid
Density	6.574 g/cm^{3} (calculated, 25 °C)
Solubility in water	Sparingly soluble in water

Structure
Crystal structure	Tetragonal, xenotime type
Space group	I4_{1}/amd, No. 141
Lattice constant	a = 0.70203 nm, c = 0.62761 nm
Formula units (Z)	4
- Except where otherwise noted, data are given for materials in their standard state (at 25 °C [77 °F], 100 kPa). Infobox references

Erbium arsenate is an inorganic compound of erbium and the arsenate ion, with the chemical formula ErAsO_{4}. It is a very pale pink, sparingly soluble crystalline solid and crystallizes in the tetragonal xenotime structure type.

== Preparation ==
Erbium arsenate can be prepared by precipitation from aqueous solutions containing erbium(III) and arsenate ions. For example, erbium(III) chloride reacts with sodium arsenate:

ErCl_{3} + Na_{3}AsO_{4} → ErAsO_{4}↓ + 3 NaCl

This preparation has been reported as part of systematic studies of rare-earth arsenates.

A standard diffraction sample was prepared from an aqueous solution of arsenic pentoxide and erbium trichloride.

== Properties ==
=== Crystal structure ===
At room temperature, ErAsO_{4} crystallizes in the tetragonal crystal system, space group I4_{1}/amd (No. 141), with the xenotime or zircon structure type.

At 25 °C, the lattice parameters are a = 7.0203 Å, c = 6.2761 Å with four formula units per unit cell. The calculated density is 6.574 g/cm^{3}.

The structure consists of isolated AsO^{3−}_{4} tetrahedra and eight-coordinate Er^{3+} ions. The NBS sample was described as very pale pink.

ErAsO_{4} belongs to the heavy rare-earth arsenate series, whose members generally adopt the tetragonal xenotime structure rather than the monoclinic monazite structure found for the largest rare-earth ions.

=== Solubility ===
Erbium arsenate is very sparingly soluble in water. A concentration-based solubility-product value of pK_{sp,c} = 22.47±0.04 has been reported.
