= Erbium(III) carbonate =

Names
- IUPAC name Erbium(III) carbonate
- Other names: Dierbium tricarbonate; Erbium carbonate

Identifiers
CAS Number	6067-35-2; monohydrate: 22992-83-2
3D model (JSmol)	Interactive image; monohydrate: Interactive image
ChemSpider	monohydrate: 21242008
EC Number	228-003-4; monohydrate: 620-661-4
PubChem CID	165402; monohydrate: 25021615
CompTox Dashboard (EPA)	DTXSID30890613; monohydrate: DTXSID20648463
- InChI: InChI=1S/3CH2O3.2Er/c3*2-1(3)4;;/h3*(H2,2,3,4);;/q;;;2*+3/p-6 Key: SKXKDIXGQVABHP-UHFFFAOYSA-H; monohydrate: InChI=1S/3CH2O3.2Er.H2O/c3*2-1(3)4;;;/h3*(H2,2,3,4);;;1H2/q;;;2*+3;/p-6 Key: JGMPMNQKIPWYKQ-UHFFFAOYSA-H
- SMILES: C(=O)([O-])[O-].C(=O)([O-])[O-].C(=O)([O-])[O-].[Er+3].[Er+3]; monohydrate: C(=O)([O-])[O-].C(=O)([O-])[O-].C(=O)([O-])[O-].O.[Er+3].[Er+3]

Properties
Chemical formula	Er_{2}(CO_{3})_{3}
Molar mass	514.542 g·mol^{−1}
Solubility in water	negligible
Solubility	soluble in acids

Hazards
- GHS labelling
Pictograms	(GHS07: Exclamation mark)
Signal word	Warning
Hazard statements	H315, H319, H335
Precautionary statements	P261, P264, P271, P280, P302, P304, P362, P405, P501
- Except where otherwise noted, data are given for materials in their standard state (at 25 °C [77 °F], 100 kPa). Infobox references

Erbium(III) carbonate is an erbium compound with the chemical formula Er_{2}(CO_{3})_{3}.

== Preparation ==
Erbium carbonate can be made by the thermal decomposition of erbium(III) trichloroacetate which can be made by the reaction between erbium(III) oxide and trichloroacetic acid.

Er_{2}O_{3} + 6 CCl_{3}CO_{2}H → 2 Er(CCl_{3}CO_{2})_{3} + 3 H_{2}O
2 Er(CCl_{3}CO_{2})_{3} → Er_{2}(CO_{3})_{3} + side products

Alternatively, the poor solubility of erbium carbonate in water can be used to precipitate it from an aqueous solution of erbium(III) ions and carbonate ions.

2 Er^{3+} + 3 CO_{3}^{2−} → Er_{2}(CO_{3})_{3}

== Properties ==
Erbium carbonate thermally decomposes to erbium(III) oxide upon heating.

Er_{2}(CO_{3})_{3} → Er_{2}O_{3} + 3 CO_{2}

This can be used to produce nano particles of erbium oxide as erbium carbonate can be selectively precipitated into particles with an average size of 36 nm. Smaller sizes between 10 nm and 20 nm have also been reported.

It has a low solubility in water but dissolves in acids like perchloric acid.

It reacts with the chelator thenoyltrifluoroacetone by losing the three carbonate ions.
