= Erbium boride =

Erbium boride may refer to:

- Erbium tetraboride, ErB_{4}
- Erbium hexaboride, ErB_{6}
