= Erbium(III) sulfide =

Names
- Other names: Erbium sesquisulfide; Dierbium trisulfide

Identifiers
CAS Number	12159-66-9
3D model (JSmol)	Interactive image
ChemSpider	145817
ECHA InfoCard	100.032.069
EC Number	235-289-4
PubChem CID	166638
CompTox Dashboard (EPA)	DTXSID30923874
- InChI: InChI=1S/2Er.3S/q2*+3;3*-2 Key: OXBZQHVXDUNTHY-UHFFFAOYSA-N
- SMILES: [S-2].[S-2].[S-2].[Er+3].[Er+3]

Properties
Chemical formula	Er_{2}S_{3}
Molar mass	430.72 g/mol
Appearance	Reddish-brown solid
Density	6.07 g/cm^{3}
Melting point	1730 °C
- Except where otherwise noted, data are given for materials in their standard state (at 25 °C [77 °F], 100 kPa). Infobox references

Erbium(III) sulfide is an inorganic compound of erbium and sulfur with the formula Er_{2}S_{3}. Several polymorphs are known, including monoclinic D- and F-type forms, a cubic T-type form with the bixbyite structure, and an orthorhombic high-pressure phase. Erbium(III) sulfide is antiferromagnetic at very low temperature.

== Preparation ==
Erbium(III) sulfide can be prepared by direct reaction of erbium and sulfur:

2 Er + 3 S → Er_{2}S_{3}

Material used for magnetic measurements has been prepared by direct combination of the elements and grown as an ingot from the melt.

It can also be prepared by sulfurization of erbium(III) oxide with hydrogen sulfide at high temperature.

Single crystals of D-Er_{2}S_{3} have been obtained by oxidation of reduced erbium chloride hydride with sulfur in the presence of sodium chloride flux at 850 °C.

== Properties ==
=== Crystal structures ===
Several polymorphs of Er_{2}S_{3} are known.

The D-type form is monoclinic, space group P2_{1}/m (No. 11), with Z = 6. Its lattice parameters are a = 17.4418 Å, b = 3.9822 Å, c = 10.1013 Å and β = 98.688°.

This structure contains two crystallographically distinct Er^{3+} environments. In material studied magnetically, half of the erbium ions are six-coordinate and half seven-coordinate by sulfur.

A second monoclinic polymorph, F-Er_{2}S_{3}, has also been isolated by vapor transport in the presence of niobium and chlorine. It also crystallizes in P2_{1}/m, but with Z = 4 and lattice parameters a = 10.901 Å, b = 3.896 Å, c = 11.167 Å and β = 108.804°.

In F-Er_{2}S_{3}, four crystallographically independent erbium sites occur: half of the Er atoms are six-coordinate, one quarter are seven-coordinate and one quarter are eight-coordinate by sulfur.

A cubic T-type polymorph with the bixbyite structure has also been obtained. It crystallizes in space group Ia3̅ and can form as a by-product in high-temperature syntheses of erbium sulfide-containing borates and thioborates.

An orthorhombic high-pressure modification with the U_{2}S_{3} structure type, space group Pnma, is also known.

=== Magnetic properties ===
D-Er_{2}S_{3} is antiferromagnetic at low temperature. Magnetic susceptibility measurements show an ordering transition near 3 K in low applied fields. The apparent Néel temperature decreases with increasing field and falls below 1.8 K at 9000 G. A Curie–Weiss fit between 100 and 300 K gives an effective magnetic moment of about 9.65 μ_{B} per Er^{3+}, close to the free-ion value. Zero-field heat-capacity measurements show a main anomaly near 3 K and a second shoulder near 2 K. The total associated entropy is approximately R ln 2, and the two anomalies have been attributed to ordering of the two crystallographically inequivalent erbium sites at slightly different temperatures.
