= Erbium(III) telluride =

Identifiers
CAS Number	12020-39-2
3D model (JSmol)	Interactive image
ChemSpider	34996724
EC Number	234-658-7
PubChem CID	6336879
- InChI: InChI=1S/2Er.3Te/q2*+3;3*-2 Key: SCFNIJFCATUCDM-UHFFFAOYSA-N
- SMILES: [Er+3].[Er+3].[Te-2].[Te-2].[Te-2]

Properties
Chemical formula	Er_{2}Te_{3}
Molar mass	717.32 g·mol^{−1}
- Except where otherwise noted, data are given for materials in their standard state (at 25 °C [77 °F], 100 kPa). Infobox references

Erbium(III) telluride is an inorganic compound, one of the tellurides of erbium, with the chemical formula Er_{2}Te_{3}. It has a Sc_{2}S_{3} structure, a space group of Fddd, a band gap of 0.77(5) eV, and semiconducting properties. It can be obtained by the reaction of erbium and tellurium or the chemical vapor transport of erbium(III) chloride.
