= Erbium(III) oxalate =

Names
- Other names Erbium oxalate

Identifiers
CAS Number	867-63-0; decahydrate: 30618-31-6
3D model (JSmol)	Interactive image; decahydrate: Interactive image
ChemSpider	144421; decahydrate: 21241403
EC Number	212-764-4; decahydrate: 677-841-0
PubChem CID	164744; decahydrate: 25021616
CompTox Dashboard (EPA)	DTXSID401014688 DTXSID50913353, DTXSID401014688; decahydrate: DTXSID80648464
- InChI: InChI=1S/3C2H2O4.2Er/c3*3-1(4)2(5)6;;/h3*(H,3,4)(H,5,6);;/q;;;2*+3/p-6 Key: CKCGDQBLLXRIBQ-UHFFFAOYSA-H; decahydrate: InChI=1S/3C2H2O4.2Er.10H2O/c3*3-1(4)2(5)6;;;;;;;;;;;;/h3*(H,3,4)(H,5,6);;;10*1H2/q;;;2*+3;;;;;;;;;;/p-6 Key: OVECSXKDHFDFMD-UHFFFAOYSA-H
- SMILES: C(=O)(C(=O)[O-])[O-].C(=O)(C(=O)[O-])[O-].C(=O)(C(=O)[O-])[O-].[Er+3].[Er+3]; decahydrate: C(=O)(C(=O)[O-])[O-].C(=O)(C(=O)[O-])[O-].C(=O)(C(=O)[O-])[O-].O.O.O.O.O.O.O.O.O.O.[Er+3].[Er+3]

Properties
Chemical formula	Er_{2}(C_{2}O_{4})_{3}
Molar mass	598.58 g/mol
Appearance	Pink to pink-red crystals (hydrates)
Solubility in water	Slightly soluble in water
- Except where otherwise noted, data are given for materials in their standard state (at 25 °C [77 °F], 100 kPa). Infobox references

Erbium(III) oxalate is an inorganic compound of erbium and the oxalate ion, with the formula Er_{2}(C_{2}O_{4})_{3}. It forms several hydrates, including well-characterized hexa-, deca- and octadecahydrates. On heating, erbium oxalate decomposes through carbonate-containing intermediates to erbium(III) oxide.

== Preparation ==
Hydrated erbium(III) oxalate can be precipitated from aqueous solutions of erbium(III) salts using oxalic acid or soluble oxalates.

Single crystals of hydrated erbium oxalates have also been grown by allowing aqueous solutions of erbium(III) chloride and potassium oxalate to diffuse slowly through gel media.

== Properties ==
=== Hydrates and crystal structures ===
Erbium(III) oxalate is unusual among the lanthanide oxalates because erbium lies near the boundary between two hydrate structure families. For lighter lanthanides, compositions of the form Ln_{2}(C_{2}O_{4})_{3}(H_{2}O)_{6}·4H_{2}O are common, whereas heavier lanthanides more often form Ln_{2}(C_{2}O_{4})_{3}(H_{2}O)_{4}·2H_{2}O. Both structure types are reported for erbium.

The decahydrate, Er_{2}(C_{2}O_{4})_{3}(H_{2}O)_{6}·4H_{2}O, crystallizes in the monoclinic space group P2_{1}/c. Its lattice parameters are a = 11.3590 Å, b = 9.6162 Å, c = 9.9401 Å and β = 118.723°, with four formula units per unit cell.

Its structure consists of parallel honeycomb-like molecular layers formed by erbium ions linked through oxalate groups.

A six-water form, Er_{2}(C_{2}O_{4})_{3}(H_{2}O)_{4}·2H_{2}O, also occurs and belongs to the heavier-lanthanide oxalate structure family.

An octadecahydrate, Er_{2}(C_{2}O_{4})_{3}(H_{2}O)_{6}·12H_{2}O, has also been structurally characterized. It crystallizes in the trigonal space group R3̅, with a = 30.8692 Å and c = 7.2307 Å, Z = 12.

The octadecahydrate forms a three-dimensional open framework containing channels of approximately 12 Å diameter. Water molecules of crystallization occupy these channels. Erbium is nine-coordinate in this phase, bonded to six oxalate oxygen atoms and three coordinated water molecules in a distorted tricapped trigonal-prismatic environment.

=== Thermal decomposition ===
Erbium(III) oxalate hydrates dehydrate stepwise on heating. A detailed thermal study of Er_{2}(C_{2}O_{4})_{3}·6H_{2}O found progressive dehydration between about 90 and 370 °C.

The hexahydrate initially loses water to form lower hydrates, including trihydrate and dihydrate phases. Anhydrous erbium oxalate is then formed but is thermally unstable.

Further heating produces carbonate-containing intermediates. An erbium oxycarbonate, Er_{2}O_{2}CO_{3}, is formed around 450 °C and decomposes near 600 °C to crystalline Er_{2}O_{3}. Water vapour, carbon monoxide and carbon dioxide are evolved during the overall decomposition.

Earlier work on rare-earth oxalates likewise found that hydrated erbium oxalate ultimately decomposes to erbium oxide on heating.

=== Complex oxalates ===
Erbium forms a number of complex oxalates in addition to the simple sesquioxalate. Reaction with alkali-metal oxalates can give compounds such as KEr(C_{2}O_{4})_{2}·4H_{2}O.

This potassium erbium oxalate crystallizes in the tetragonal space group I4_{1}/amd, with a = 11.4145 Å and c = 8.893 Å. Its structure contains square channels running parallel to the c axis.

Acidic oxalate complexes have also been reported, including H[Er(C_{2}O_{4})_{2}]·6H_{2}O.
