= Erbium(III) sulfate =

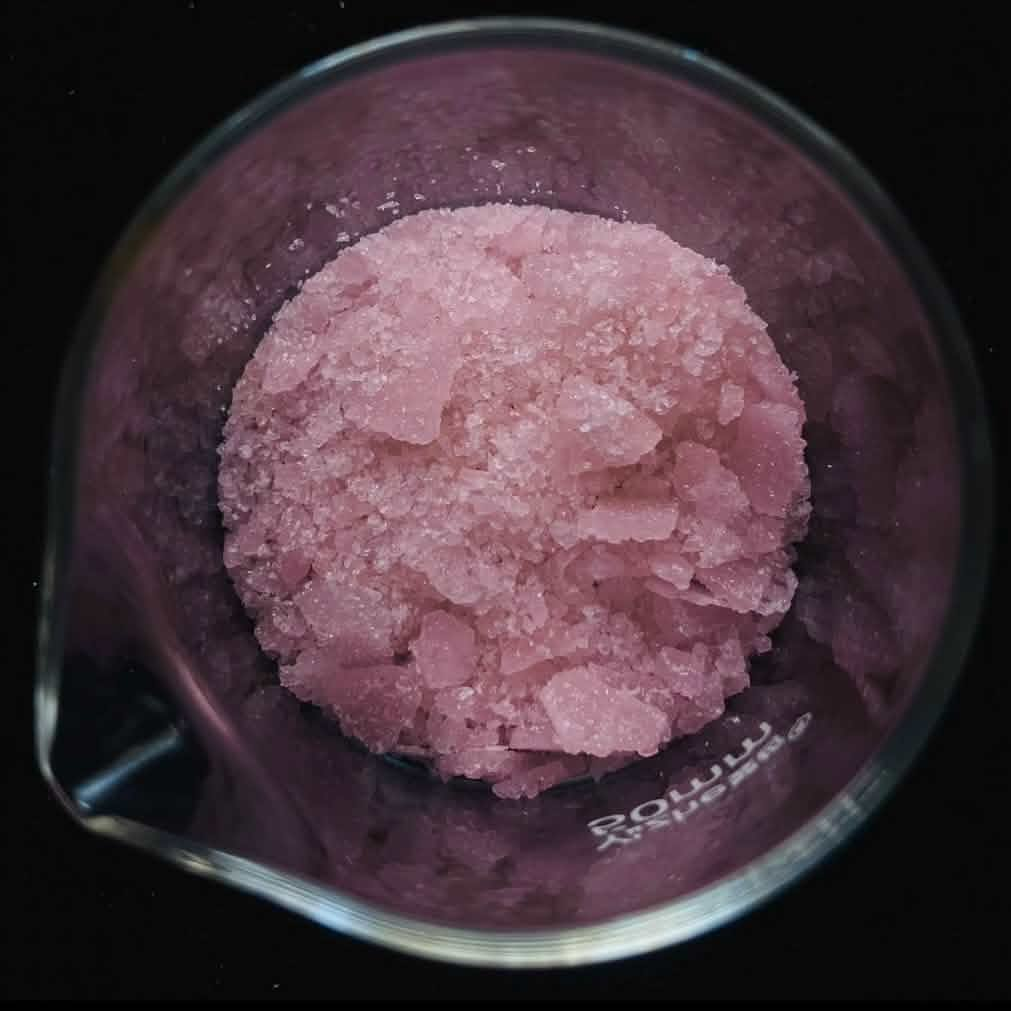
- Octahydrate

Names
- IUPAC name Erbium(III) sulfate
- Other names: Dierbium trisulphate; Erbium Sulfate

Identifiers
CAS Number	13478-49-4 Anhydrous; 10031-52-4 Octahydrate
3D model (JSmol)	Interactive image
ChemSpider	145961
ECHA InfoCard	100.033.421
EC Number	680-959-5
PubChem CID	166829
UNII	859WC72L9X
CompTox Dashboard (EPA)	DTXSID40648465
- InChI: InChI=1S/2Er.3H2O4S/c;;3*1-5(2,3)4/h;;3*(H2,1,2,3,4)/q2*+3;;;/p-6 Key: SYDXSHCNMKOQFW-UHFFFAOYSA-H
- SMILES: [O-]S(=O)(=O)[O-].[O-]S(=O)(=O)[O-].[O-]S(=O)(=O)[O-].[Er+3].[Er+3]

Properties
Chemical formula	Er_{2}O_{12}S_{3}
Molar mass	622.69 g·mol^{−1}
Appearance	pink crystalline solid
Density	3.678 g/cm^{3} (anhydrous); 3.217 g/cm^{3} (octahydrate)
Melting point	400 °C (752 °F; 673 K) decomposes (octahydrate)
Solubility in water	octahydrate 160 g/L (20 °C); 65.3 g/L (40 °C)

Hazards
- GHS labelling
Pictograms	(GHS07: Exclamation mark)
Signal word	Warning
Hazard statements	H315, H319, H335
Precautionary statements	P261, P264, P264+P265, P271, P280, P302+P352, P304+P340, P305+P351+P338, P319, P321, P332+P317, P337+P317, P362+P364, P403+P233, P405, P501
- Except where otherwise noted, data are given for materials in their standard state (at 25 °C [77 °F], 100 kPa). Infobox references

Erbium(III) sulfate is an erbium compound with the chemical formula Er_{2}(SO_{4})_{3}. It is a pink crystalline salt, readily absorbing water to form an octahydrate. It is used as a colorant in glass manufacturing and porcelain enamel glazes, as well as a dopant in the production of optical fiber.

== Structure ==
The anhydrous compound (Er_{2}(SO_{4})_{4}) forms orthorhombic crystals (space group: Pbcn (No. 60), a = 1269.5 pm, b = 915.0 pm, c = 923.7 pm, molar volume = 161.5 cm^{3}/mol, formula units = 4 units per cell).

A dimorphic hydrogensulfate (Er(HSO_{4})_{3}) exists:

- Form I: orthorhombic (space group: Pbca (No. 61), a = 1195.0 pm, b = 949.30 pm, c = 1644.3 pm, molar volume = 140.4 cm^{3}/mol, formula units = 8 units per cell)
- Form II: monoclinic (space group: P2_{1}/n (No. 14), a = 520.00 pm, b = 1357.8 pm, c = 1233.4 pm, β = 92.13 °, molar volume = 131.0 cm^{3}/mol, formula units = 4 units per cell)

A mixed sulfate-hydrogensulfate (Er(HSO_{4})(SO_{4})) forms monoclinic crystals (space group: P2_{1}/n (No. 14), a = 545.61 pm, b = 1075.6 pm, c = 1053.1 pm, β = 104.58 °, molar volume = 90.0 cm^{3}/mol, formula units = 4 units per cell).

== Synthesis ==
Erbium sulfate can be prepared by dissolving erbium(III) oxide in sulfuric acid:

Er_{2}O_{3} + 3 H_{2}SO_{4} → Er_{2}(SO_{4})_{3} + 3 H_{2}O

The rod shaped "Form I" of the hydrogensulfate crystallizes from concentrated sulfuric acid at 250 °C. In diluted sulfuric acid (85% with added Na_{2}SO_{4}), the brick shaped "Form II" crystallizes at 250 °C, while at 60 °C the mixed sulfate-hydrogensulfate is obtained.

The anhydrous compound cannot be prepared from solution but crystallizes from molten salt (with sodium impurities).
