= Erbium(III) selenide =

Identifiers
CAS Number	12020-38-1
3D model (JSmol)	Interactive image
ChemSpider	4891871
ECHA InfoCard	100.031.494
EC Number	234-657-1
PubChem CID	6336878
- InChI: InChI=1S/2Er.3Se Key: SAJINCSOEUABRO-UHFFFAOYSA-N
- SMILES: [Se].[Se].[Se].[Er].[Er]

Properties
Chemical formula	Er_{2}Se_{3}
Molar mass	571.431 g·mol^{−1}
Appearance	green-brown or yellow crystals
Density	6.83 g·cm^{−3} 6.855 g·cm^{−3}
- Except where otherwise noted, data are given for materials in their standard state (at 25 °C [77 °F], 100 kPa). Infobox references

Erbium(III) selenide is an inorganic compound with a chemical formula of Er_{2}Se_{3}.

== Preparation ==
Erbium(III) selenide can be obtained by the reaction of erbium and selenium:

2 Er + 3 Se → Er_{2}Se_{3}

It can also be prepared by reacting erbium oxide and hydrogen selenide at high temperature.

Er_{2}O_{3} + 3 H_{2}Se → Er_{2}Se_{3} + 3 H_{2}O

== Properties ==
Erbium(III) selenide is an orthorhombic crystal with a Sc_{2}S_{3} structure and a space group of Fddd. It reacts with magnesium selenide at 1000 °C to obtain MgEr_{2}Se_{4}.

== External reading ==
- Anna Kornienko, J. H. Melman, G. Hall, T. J. Emge, John G. Brennan (2002-01-01). "Chalcogen Rich Lanthanide Clusters from Halide Starting Materials (II): Selenido Compounds". Inorganic Chemistry. 41 (1): 121–126. doi:10.1021/ic010740o. ISSN 0020-1669. PMID 11782150.
