= Erbium nitride =

Names
- Other names erbium mononitride, azanylidynerbium

Identifiers
CAS Number	12020-21-2
3D model (JSmol)	Interactive image
EC Number	234-654-5
PubChem CID	82806
CompTox Dashboard (EPA)	DTXSID901315095
- InChI: InChI=1S/Er.N Key: VZVZYLVXLCEAMR-UHFFFAOYSA-N
- SMILES: N#[Er]

Properties
Chemical formula	ErN
Molar mass	181.266 g·mol^{−1}
Appearance	Crystalline
- Except where otherwise noted, data are given for materials in their standard state (at 25 °C [77 °F], 100 kPa). Infobox references

Erbium nitride is a binary inorganic compound of erbium and nitrogen with the chemical formula ErN.

== Physical properties ==
The compound forms black powder. Chemically, ErN is more reactive and easily degraded in the air. High humidity causes ErN to hydrolyze, forming Er(OH)_{3} and ammonia.

ErN is known for its magnetic and optical properties.

== Uses ==
The compound may be incorporated into III-nitride semiconductors in order to create new functional materials for optoelectronic and spintronic devices.
