= Erbium(III) bromide =

Names
- IUPAC name Erbium(III) bromide
- Other names Erbium tribromide

Identifiers
CAS Number	13536-73-7
3D model (JSmol)	Interactive image
ChemSpider	75392
ECHA InfoCard	100.033.526
EC Number	236-895-1
PubChem CID	83562
CompTox Dashboard (EPA)	DTXSID4065525
- InChI: InChI=1S/3BrH.Er/h3*1H;/q;;;+3/p-3 Key: GZTUDAKVGXUNIM-UHFFFAOYSA-K
- SMILES: Br[Er](Br)Br

Properties
Chemical formula	ErBr_{3}
Molar mass	406.971 g·mol^{−1}
Appearance	Violet crystalline solid
Melting point	923 °C (1,693 °F; 1,196 K)
- Except where otherwise noted, data are given for materials in their standard state (at 25 °C [77 °F], 100 kPa). Infobox references

Erbium(III) bromide is an inorganic compound of erbium and bromide, with the formula ErBr_{3}. The anhydrous compound is a rose-violet, hygroscopic solid, while the hexahydrate, ErBr_{3}·6H_{2}O, forms pink crystals.

== Preparation ==
Anhydrous erbium(III) bromide can be prepared from erbium(III) oxide using the ammonium-bromide route. In this method, the oxide is reacted with excess ammonium bromide, initially producing an ammonium bromide complex which decomposes on heating to give the anhydrous tribromide:

Er_{2}O_{3} + 12 NH_{4}Br → 2 (NH_{4})_{3}ErBr_{6} + 6 NH_{4} + 6 H_{2}O
(NH_{4})_{3}ErBr_{6} → ErBr_{3} + 3 NH_{4}Br

summarized as:

Er_{2}O_{3} + 6 NH_{4}Br → 2 ErBr_{3} + 6 NH_{3} + 3 H_{2}O

The hexahydrate can be crystallized from an aqueous erbium bromide solution acidified with hydrobromic acid.

== Properties ==
=== Anhydrous compound ===
Anhydrous ErBr_{3} is a light rose-violet, hygroscopic crystalline solid.

It melts at about 923 °C. It is readily soluble in water but is moisture-sensitive in the anhydrous state.

Molten ErBr_{3} has been investigated by neutron diffraction. The melt retains strong short-range Er–Br correlations but loses the long-range order of the crystalline phase. The Er-Br distance is 2.85 Å, with a coordination number of six bromine atoms around each erbium atom.

The crystal structure or ErBr_{3} is rhombohedral, crystalizing in space group R3̅. This is the same as for other heavy rare earth element bromides.

=== Hexahydrate ===
Erbium(III) bromide hexahydrate, ErBr_{3}·6H_{2}O, forms pink crystals.

The hydrated lanthanide bromides form a structural family all having monoclinic form with space group P2/n (P2/c).

The hydrate readily loses water on heating, but direct dehydration is liable to produce erbium oxybromide rather than pure anhydrous ErBr_{3}; this is why ammonium-halide methods are preferred for preparation of oxygen-free anhydrous material.

=== Reactions ===
Erbium(III) bromide reacts with lithium bromide at elevated temperature to form the ternary bromide Li_{3}ErBr_{6}:

ErBr_{3} + 3 LiBr → Li_{3}ErBr_{6}

Lithium ions are highly mobile in Li_{3}ErBr_{6}. It has a monoclinc crystal form with space group C2/m and lattice parameters a = 6.890, b = 11.916, c = 6.842 Å, β = 109.77(6)° with two formulas per unit cell.

Na_{3}ErBr_{6} also crystalizes in the monoclinic system but with space group P2_{1}/n and lattice parameters a = 7.191 b = 7.683 c = 10.715 Å 90.61° and Z=2. It transitions to an R3̅ form below −60 °C.
