= Erbium diboride =

Names
- Other names Erbium boride

Identifiers

Properties
Chemical formula	ErB_{2}
Molar mass	188.88 g/mol
Density	8.94 g/cm^{3}

Structure
Crystal structure	Hexagonal, aluminium diboride type
Space group	P6/mmm, No. 191
Lattice constant	a = 0.32725 nm, c = 0.37845 nm
Formula units (Z)	1
- Except where otherwise noted, data are given for materials in their standard state (at 25 °C [77 °F], 100 kPa). Infobox references

Erbium diboride is an inorganic compound of erbium and boron with the chemical formula ErB_{2}. It crystallizes in the hexagonal aluminium diboride structure type and is a metallic rare-earth diboride. At low temperature, ErB_{2} undergoes a ferromagnetic transition near 14 K and exhibits a sizeable magnetocaloric effect.

== Preparation ==
Erbium diboride can be prepared by reaction of elemental erbium and boron:

Er + 2 B → ErB_{2}

Polycrystalline material may be produced by arc melting erbium and boron under an inert atmosphere.

Unlike many congruently melting compounds, ErB_{2} forms by a weakly peritectic reaction. The liquid endpoint of the peritectic lies near 65 at.% boron and about 2185 °C, only slightly removed from the 66.7 at.% boron composition of stoichiometric ErB_{2}.

This behavior allows large single crystals to be grown using a traveling-solvent floating-zone method. In one procedure, stoichiometric ErB_{2} feed and seed rods were used while the molten zone self-adjusted toward the boron-poorer peritectic composition. Growth was performed under high-pressure argon at temperatures above 2000 °C.

Earlier single-crystal platelets were grown from an erbium-rich molten flux at about 1750 °C.

== Properties ==
=== Crystal structure ===
ErB_{2} crystallizes in the hexagonal crystal system, space group P6/mmm (No. 191), with the AlB_{2} structure type.

A modern Rietveld refinement gives lattice parameters a = 3.2725(2) Å and c = 3.7845(3) Å.

The structure consists of alternating layers of erbium atoms and planar hexagonal boron nets. Er occupies the (0,0,0) position, while the boron atoms occupy the (1/3,2/3,1/2) and (2/3,1/3,1/2) positions.

=== Magnetic properties ===
ErB_{2} undergoes a ferromagnetic transition at about 14 K. Measurements of single crystals show strong magnetic anisotropy, with the basal plane acting as the magnetically easy plane.

Above the ordering temperature, the magnetic susceptibility follows approximately Curie–Weiss behavior. The effective magnetic moment is close to that expected for free Er^{3+} ions, indicating that the magnetism is dominated by localized erbium 4f moments.

Pressure measurements up to 5.6 GPa show that the magnetic ordering temperature increases with pressure, indicating stabilization of the ordered state as the lattice contracts.

=== Magnetocaloric properties ===
ErB_{2} displays a pronounced low-temperature magnetocaloric effect around its ferromagnetic transition.

For a magnetic-field change of 5 T, the peak magnetic entropy change reaches about 26.1 J kg^{−1} K^{−1} near 14 K. The corresponding peak adiabatic temperature change is about 8.6 K.

The magnetocaloric response is characteristic of a second-order ferromagnetic transition, with the specific-heat anomaly shifting and broadening toward higher temperature under an applied magnetic field.

=== Electrical transport ===
ErB_{2} is metallic. Its electrical resistivity shows a clear anomaly near the magnetic ordering temperature, reflecting the reduction in magnetic scattering on entering the ordered state.

Under quasi-hydrostatic pressure, the resistivity anomaly moves to higher temperature, consistent with the pressure-induced increase in the ferromagnetic transition temperature.
