= Erbium carbide =

Names
- Other names Erbium dicarbide

Identifiers
| CAS Number | 12192-37-9 |
| 3D model (JSmol) | Interactive image |
- InChI: InChI=1S/2C.Er
- SMILES: [Er].[C].[C]

Properties
| Chemical formula | ErC_{2} |
| Molar mass | 191.28 g/mol |

Structure
| Crystal structure | Tetragonal, calcium carbide type |
| Space group | I4/mmm, No. 139 |
| Lattice constant | a = 0.3622 nm, c = 0.6106 nm |
| Formula units (Z) | 2 |
- Except where otherwise noted, data are given for materials in their standard state (at 25 °C [77 °F], 100 kPa). Infobox references

Erbium carbide is an inorganic compound of erbium and carbon with the formula ErC_{2}. At room temperature it crystallizes in the tetragonal calcium carbide structure type and contains C_{2} units characteristic of rare-earth dicarbides.

== Preparation ==
Erbium carbide can be prepared by arc melting stoichiometric amounts of metallic erbium and carbon:

Er + 2 C → ErC_{2}

Arc melting was used to prepare phase-pure ErC_{2} for neutron-diffraction studies.

Thin films of ErC_{2} have also been grown directly on diamond. Reactive deposition of erbium onto hydrogen-terminated diamond at about 750 °C under a low pressure of methane gives an epitaxial erbium dicarbide layer.

== Properties ==
=== Crystal structure ===
At room temperature, ErC_{2} crystallizes in the tetragonal crystal system, space group I4/mmm (No. 139), with the CaC_{2} structure type.

Neutron powder diffraction gives the lattice parameters a = 3.622(1) Å, c = 6.106(1) Å, with two formula units per unit cell.

The carbon atoms occur as discrete C_{2} units. Their C–C bond length is 1.275(3) Å, close to that of an acetylide C≡C bond. Mild hydrolysis of ErC_{2} also supports the presence of acetylide-like carbon pairs.

=== High-temperature phase ===
Like many rare-earth dicarbides, ErC_{2} undergoes a tetragonal-to-cubic structural transition on heating.

Thermal and electrical measurements place the transition at approximately 1100–1200 °C, depending on experimental method.

The high-temperature form has a cubic fluorite-related structure in space group Fm3̅m. In this phase the orientation of the C_{2} units becomes dynamically or statistically disordered.

=== Electronic properties ===
ErC_{2} is metallic and has a comparatively low work function. Values around 2.9–3.0 eV have been reported for bulk or carbide-covered surfaces.

Its low work function and thermal stability have led to investigation of ErC_{2} as an electrode material in electronic devices.

== Thin films and applications ==
Epitaxial ErC_{2} films have been grown on boron-doped diamond (100). The ErC_{2}(100) plane lies parallel to the diamond (100) surface, with the carbide lattice rotated by 45° relative to the diamond substrate.

ErC_{2} has also been deposited by atomic layer deposition on high-k dielectric materials. Films deposited on HfO_{2} showed an effective work function as low as about 3.9 eV and remained stable after high-temperature annealing.

The ALD-grown material was investigated as a possible low-work-function metal electrode for n-channel MOSFET technology.
