= Erbium(III) fluoride =

Names
- Other names Erbium trifluoride

Identifiers
CAS Number	13760-83-3
3D model (JSmol)	Interactive image
ChemSpider	75535
ECHA InfoCard	100.033.946
EC Number	237-356-3
PubChem CID	83713
UNII	KN5QX6WLL7
CompTox Dashboard (EPA)	DTXSID3065615
- InChI: InChI=1S/Er.3FH/h;3*1H/q+3;;;/p-3 Key: QGJSAGBHFTXOTM-UHFFFAOYSA-K
- SMILES: [F-].[F-].[F-].[Er+3]

Properties
Chemical formula	ErF_{3}
Appearance	pinkish powder
Density	7.820g/cm^{3}
Melting point	1,146 °C (2,095 °F; 1,419 K)
Boiling point	2,200 °C (3,990 °F; 2,470 K)
Solubility in water	n/a

Hazards
- GHS labelling
Pictograms	(GHS06: Toxic) (GHS07: Exclamation mark)
Signal word	Danger
Hazard statements	H301, H311, H315, H319, H331, H335
Precautionary statements	P261, P264, P270, P271, P280, P301+P310, P302+P352, P304+P340, P305+P351+P338, P311, P312, P321, P322, P330, P332+P313, P337+P313, P361, P362, P363, P403+P233, P405, P501
- Except where otherwise noted, data are given for materials in their standard state (at 25 °C [77 °F], 100 kPa). Infobox references

Erbium(III) fluoride is the fluoride of erbium, a rare earth metal, with the chemical formula ErF_{3}. It can be used to make infrared light-transmitting materials and up-converting luminescent materials.

== Production ==
Erbium(III) fluoride can be produced by reacting erbium(III) nitrate and ammonium fluoride:

Er(NO_{3})_{3} + 3 NH_{4}F → 3 NH_{4}NO_{3} + ErF_{3}
