= Erbium(III) nitrate =

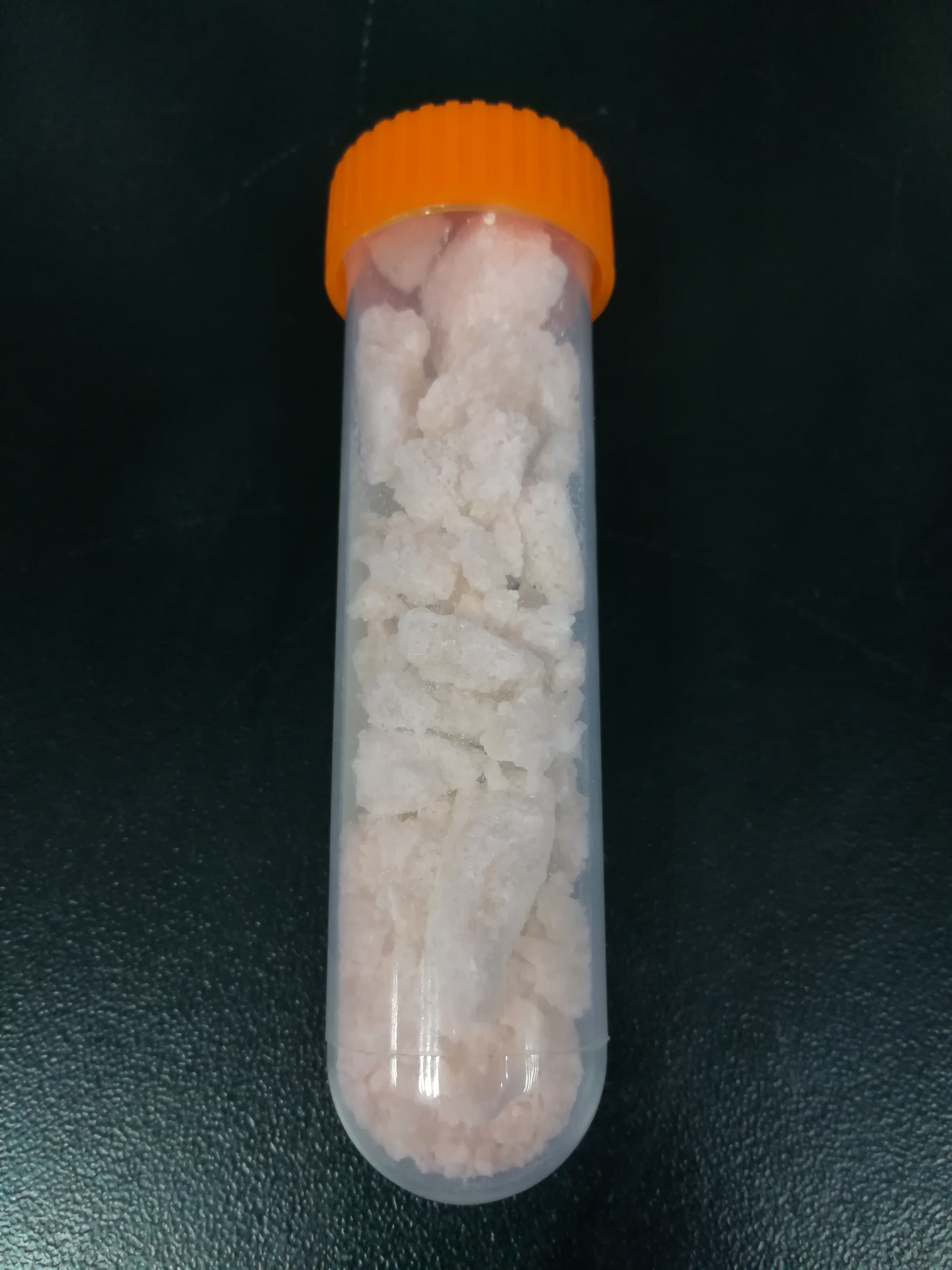

Names
- Other names Erbium trinitrate, Erbium nitrate

Identifiers
CAS Number	10168-80-6; hexahydrate: 13476-05-6; pentahydrate: 10031-51-3
3D model (JSmol)	Interactive image; hexahydrate: Interactive image; pentahydrate: Interactive image
ChemSpider	pentahydrate: 21241306
EC Number	pentahydrate: 233-436-7
PubChem CID	hexahydrate: 202892; pentahydrate: 53249207
CompTox Dashboard (EPA)	DTXSID20890647; hexahydrate: DTXSID60158935; pentahydrate: DTXSID60692900
- InChI: hexahydrate: InChI=1S/Er.3NO3.6H2O/c;3*2-1(3)4;;;;;;/h;;;;6*1H2/q+3;3*-1;;;;;; Key: SXJVNCWLEGIRSJ-UHFFFAOYSA-N; pentahydrate: InChI=1S/Er.3NO3.5H2O/c;3*2-1(3)4;;;;;/h;;;;5*1H2/q+3;3*-1;;;;; Key: LWHHUEHWVBVASY-UHFFFAOYSA-N
- SMILES: [N+](=O)([O-])[O-].[N+](=O)([O-])[O-].[N+](=O)([O-])[O-].[Er+3]; hexahydrate: [N+](=O)([O-])[O-].[N+](=O)([O-])[O-].[N+](=O)([O-])[O-].O.O.O.O.O.O.[Er+3]; pentahydrate: [N+](=O)([O-])[O-].[N+](=O)([O-])[O-].[N+](=O)([O-])[O-].O.O.O.O.O.[Er+3]

Properties
Chemical formula	ErN_{3}O_{9}
Molar mass	353.271 g·mol^{−1}
Appearance	Pink crystals
Melting point	430 °C (806 °F; 703 K)
Solubility in water	Soluble
Solubility in ethanol	Soluble

Hazards
- GHS labelling
Pictograms	(GHS03: Oxidizing) (GHS05: Corrosive) (GHS07: Exclamation mark)
Signal word	Danger
Hazard statements	H272, H315, H318, H319, H335
Precautionary statements	P210, P220, P221, P261, P264, P271, P280, P302+P352, P304+P340, P305+P351+P338, P310, P312, P321, P332+P313, P337+P313, P362, P370+P378, P403+P233, P405, P501

Related compounds
Related compounds	Terbium(III) nitrate
- Except where otherwise noted, data are given for materials in their standard state (at 25 °C [77 °F], 100 kPa). Infobox references

Erbium(III) nitrate is an inorganic compound, a salt of erbium and nitric acid with the chemical formula Er(NO_{3})_{3}. The compound forms pink crystals, readily soluble in water. A pentahydrate and hexahydrate also exist.

== Synthesis ==
Dissolving metallic erbium in nitric acid:

Er + 6 HNO_{3} → Er(NO_{3})_{3} + 3 NO_{2} + 3 H_{2}O ↑

Dissolving erbium oxide or hydroxide in nitric acid:

Er(OH)_{3} + 3 HNO_{3} → Er(NO_{3})_{3} + 3 H_{2}O ↑

Reaction of nitrogen dioxide with metallic erbium:

Er + 3 N_{2}O_{4} → Er(NO_{3})_{3} + 3 NO ↑

== Properties ==
Both erbium(III) nitrate and its crystalline hydrate decompose on heating. The hydrated erbium nitrate thermally decomposes to form ErONO_{3} and then erbium oxide.

== Applications ==
It is used to obtain metallic erbium and is also used as a chemical reagent.
