= Erbium(III) iodide =

Names
- IUPAC name Erbium(III) Iodide
- Other names Erbium Triiodide

Identifiers
CAS Number	13813-42-8
3D model (JSmol)	Interactive image
ChemSpider	75571
ECHA InfoCard	100.034.051
PubChem CID	83749
CompTox Dashboard (EPA)	DTXSID0065646
- InChI: InChI=1S/Er.3HI/h;3*1H/q+3;;;/p-3 Key: OKVQKDALNLHZLB-UHFFFAOYSA-K; InChI=1/Er.3HI/h;3*1H/q+3;;;/p-3 Key: OKVQKDALNLHZLB-DFZHHIFOAK
- SMILES: I[Er](I)I

Properties
Chemical formula	ErI_{3}
Molar mass	547.947 g/mol
Appearance	Powder
Density	5.5 g/cm^{3}
Melting point	1,020 °C (1,870 °F; 1,290 K)
Boiling point	1,280 °C (2,340 °F; 1,550 K)

Hazards
- GHS labelling
Pictograms	(GHS08: Health hazard)
Signal word	Danger
Hazard statements	H360
Precautionary statements	P203, P280, P318, P405, P501
- Except where otherwise noted, data are given for materials in their standard state (at 25 °C [77 °F], 100 kPa). Infobox references

Erbium(III) iodide is an iodide of lanthanide metal erbium. The compound is insoluble in water and is white to slightly pink in appearance.

== Preparation ==
Erbium(III) iodide can be produced by the reaction of elemental iodine and finely divided erbium by the following equation:

2 Er + 3 I_{2} → 2 ErI_{3}

== Properties ==
Erbium(III) iodide has a trigonal crystal structure with space group R3̅ (space group no. 148).
