= Erbium antimonide =

Names
- Other names Erbium monoantimonide

Identifiers
CAS Number	12020-24-5
3D model (JSmol)	Interactive image
ChemSpider	129861493
EC Number	234-655-0
PubChem CID	20835927
CompTox Dashboard (EPA)	DTXSID00884504
- InChI: InChI=1S/Er.Sb Key: ZWYQVOZZNFTGDE-UHFFFAOYSA-N
- SMILES: [Sb].[Er]

Properties
Chemical formula	ErSb
Molar mass	289.02 g/mol
Density	8.432 g/cm^{3} (calculated)

Structure
Crystal structure	Cubic, rock-salt type
Space group	Fm3̅m, No. 225
Lattice constant	a = 0.6106 nm
Formula units (Z)	4
- Except where otherwise noted, data are given for materials in their standard state (at 25 °C [77 °F], 100 kPa). Infobox references

Erbium antimonide is an inorganic compound of erbium and antimony with the chemical formula ErSb. It is a rare-earth monoantimonide that crystallizes in the cubic rock salt structure and is a semimetal. At low temperature it orders antiferromagnetically.

== Preparation ==
Bulk ErSb can be prepared by direct reaction of erbium and antimony:

Er + Sb → ErSb

Erbium–antimony alloys have been synthesized by reacting the elements in evacuated silica tubes at about 600 °C for several days, followed by high-temperature homogenization.

More recently, single-phase ErSb has been prepared by induction melting high-purity erbium and antimony, followed by annealing at 800 °C for five days.

== Properties ==
=== Crystal structure ===
ErSb crystallizes in the cubic crystal system with the rock-salt structure, space group Fm3̅m (No. 225), with four formula units per unit cell, with a lattice parameter of a = 6.106 Å. Er occupies the (0,0,0) position and Sb the (1/2,1/2,1/2) position. The calculated density from this cell is 8.432 g/cm^{3}.

The compound melts congruently at about 2040 °C.

=== Electronic properties ===
ErSb is a semimetal. Its electronic structure contains both electron and hole pockets at the Fermi level, with strongly localized Er 4f states and more dispersive Er 5d- and Sb 5p-derived bands.

Calculations place hole pockets near the Γ point and an electron pocket near X, producing the semimetallic band overlap.

Scanning-tunnelling spectroscopy on nanoscale ErSb inclusions likewise finds no discernible band gap, even for small nanoparticles for which quantum-confinement models had predicted a semiconductor transition.

=== Magnetic properties ===
ErSb is antiferromagnetic at low temperature. Recent magnetic measurements give a Néel temperature of approximately 3.7 K.

Older pressure-dependent measurements also identified ErSb as an antiferromagnetic member of the rare-earth monoantimonide series.

The magnetic ordering is coupled to the crystal lattice. Elastic and thermal-expansion measurements show a structural anomaly accompanying the magnetic transition, indicating substantial magnetoelastic coupling.

Applied magnetic fields produce first-order field-induced magnetic transitions. ErSb consequently exhibits both conventional and inverse magnetocaloric effects at temperatures close to its antiferromagnetic transition. For a field change of 0–7 T, a maximum magnetic entropy change of about 20.8 J kg^{−1} K^{−1} and a refrigerant capacity of about 214 J kg^{−1} were reported.

=== Nanostructures ===
ErSb can be grown by molecular-beam epitaxy as nanostructures embedded in gallium antimonide. Depending on erbium concentration and growth conditions, the inclusions can form approximately spherical nanoparticles, elongated nanorods or nanowires.

The morphology evolves systematically with Er concentration, while the nanostructures retain semimetallic electrical behavior. Their shape-dependent response from terahertz through optical frequencies has also led to investigation of ErSb/GaSb composites as plasmonic materials.
