= Erbium tetraboride =

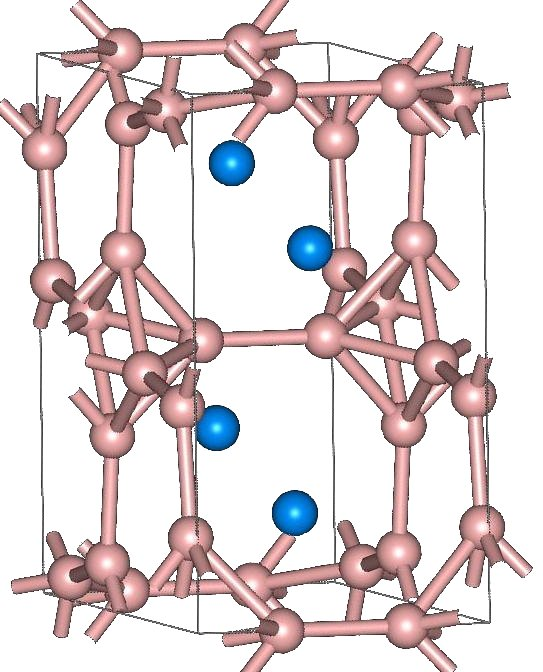

Names
- IUPAC name Erbium tetraboride

Identifiers
CAS Number	12310-44-0
3D model (JSmol)	Interactive image
ChemSpider	62855474
ECHA InfoCard	100.032.331
EC Number	235-578-5
PubChem CID	92026692 has wrong formula
CompTox Dashboard (EPA)	DTXSID301014297
- InChI: InChI=1S/4B.Er Key: ZJQHBIRDYKOZLM-UHFFFAOYSA-N
- SMILES: [Er].[B].[B].[B].[B]

Properties
Chemical formula	B_{4}Er
Molar mass	210.50 g·mol^{−1}
Melting point	2,360 °C; 4,280 °F; 2,633 K

Related compounds
Related compounds	Erbium hexaboride
- Except where otherwise noted, data are given for materials in their standard state (at 25 °C [77 °F], 100 kPa). Infobox references

Erbium tetraboride is a boride of the lanthanide metal erbium with the chemical formula ErB_{4}. It is hard and has a high melting point. Industrial applications of erbium boride include use in semiconductors, gas turbine blades, and rocket engine nozzles.
