= Erbium hexaboride =

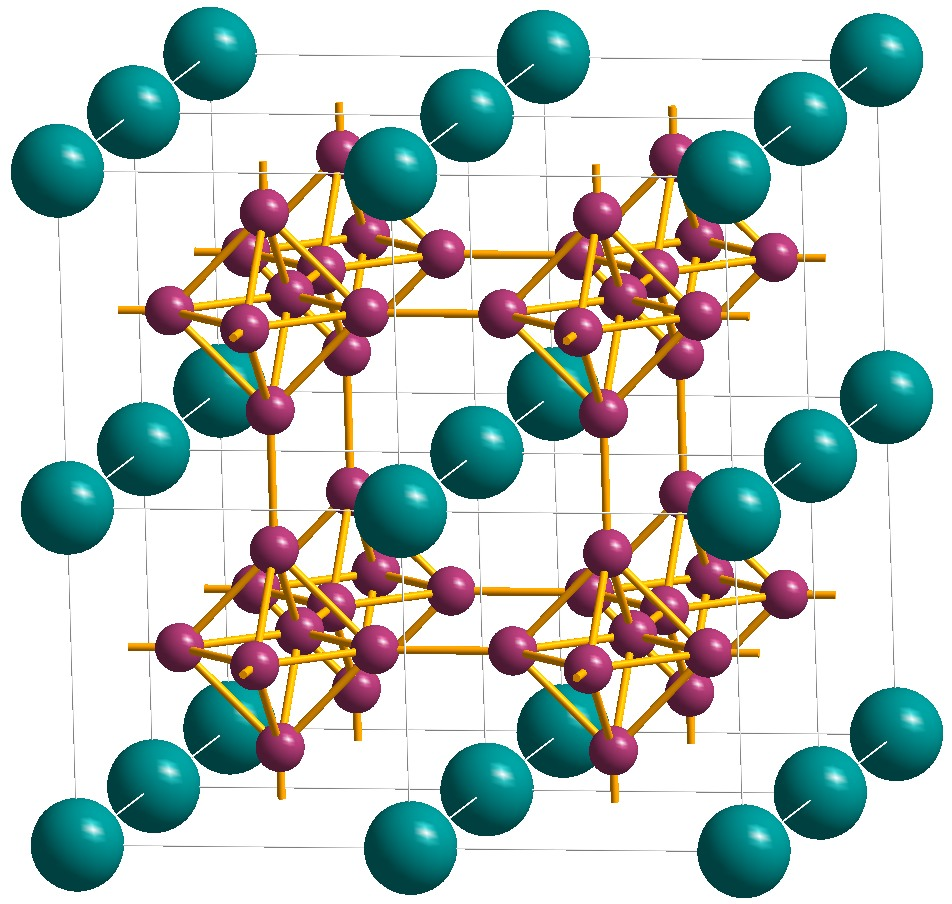

Identifiers
CAS Number	12046-33-2
3D model (JSmol)	Interactive image
ChemSpider	64886481
ECHA InfoCard	100.031.775
EC Number	234-966-1
CompTox Dashboard (EPA)	DTXSID901045541
- InChI: InChI=1S/6B.Er Key: WXPXCBAWWAGCCB-UHFFFAOYSA-N
- SMILES: [Er].[B].[B].[B].[B].[B].[B]

Properties
Chemical formula	B_{6}Er
Molar mass	232.12 g·mol^{−1}

Related compounds
Related compounds	Erbium tetraboride
- Except where otherwise noted, data are given for materials in their standard state (at 25 °C [77 °F], 100 kPa). Infobox references

Erbium hexaboride (ErB_{6}) is a rare-earth hexaboride compound containing the element erbium, which has a calcium hexaboride crystal structure.

It is one of the fundamental compounds formed in reactions between erbium and boron. The compound is isostructural with all other reported rare-earth hexaboride compounds including lanthanum hexaboride, samarium hexaboride, and cerium hexaboride. Due to the isostructural nature of the rare-earth hexaborides and the strong interaction of boron octahedra within the crystal, these compounds show a high degree of lattice matching which suggests the possibility of doping by substituting one rare earth metal within the crystal with another. Until recently, it had been hypothesized that erbium hexaboride was unstable due to the small size of the Er^{3+} cation within the crystal structure when compared to the ionic radii of other rare-earth elements that form known rare-earth hexaboride compounds. It has now been demonstrated, however, that new nanoscale synthetic methods are capable of producing high-purity, stable erbium hexaboride nanowires. These wires, produced using chemical vapor deposition (CVD), have a reported lattice constant of 4.1 Å.
