= Erbium arsenide =

Names
- Other names Erbium monoarsenide

Identifiers
CAS Number	12254-88-5
3D model (JSmol)	Interactive image
ChemSpider	74882
EC Number	235-501-5
PubChem CID	82998
- InChI: InChI=1S/As.Er/q-3;+3 Key: QSKURASNENOPNG-UHFFFAOYSA-N
- SMILES: [Er+3].[As-3]

Properties
Chemical formula	ErAs
Molar mass	242.18 g/mol
Appearance	Crystalline solid
Density	8.54 g/cm^{3} (calculated)

Structure
Crystal structure	Cubic, rock-salt type
Space group	Fm3̅m, No. 225
Lattice constant	a = 0.5732 nm
Formula units (Z)	4
- Except where otherwise noted, data are given for materials in their standard state (at 25 °C [77 °F], 100 kPa). Infobox references

Erbium arsenide is an inorganic compound of erbium and arsenic with the chemical formula ErAs. It is a semimetal that crystallizes in the cubic rock salt structure type. ErAs has been extensively studied as an epitaxial semimetal in III–V semiconductor heterostructures and as nanoscale inclusions in gallium arsenide.

== Preparation ==
Bulk erbium arsenide can be prepared by direct reaction of elemental erbium and arsenic:

Er + As → ErAs

ErAs thin films and nanostructures can also be grown by molecular-beam epitaxy. When erbium is incorporated into GaAs above its low solid-solubility limit, ErAs precipitates with the cubic rock-salt structure.

Epitaxial ErAs layers have likewise been grown directly on GaAs and related III–V semiconductor surfaces.

== Properties ==
=== Crystal structure ===
ErAs crystallizes in the cubic crystal system with the rock-salt structure, space group Fm3̅m (No. 225), with four formula units per unit cell

and a lattice parameter of a = 5.732 Å. The corresponding calculated density is approximately 8.54 g/cm^{3}.

Er and As occupy alternating sites of the NaCl lattice. The close structural relationship between rock-salt ErAs and zinc-blende III–V semiconductors facilitates epitaxial growth despite their different coordination geometries.

=== Electronic properties ===
ErAs is a semimetal rather than a semiconductor. Experimental and theoretical studies show overlapping electron and hole bands at the Fermi level.

The electronic structure contains strongly localized Er 4f states in addition to broader Er 5d- and As-derived bands. First-principles treatments generally require explicit treatment of the localized 4f electrons to reproduce the observed semimetallic state.

Photoemission and inverse-photoemission measurements on epitaxial ErAs(100) films show dispersive bulk bands broadly consistent with calculated band structures, together with localized erbium multiplet states and surface resonances.

Bulk and epitaxial ErAs have electron and hole concentrations of order 10^{20} cm^{−3}, characteristic of a compensated semimetal.

=== Magnetic properties ===
The localized Er 4f electrons give ErAs a substantial magnetic moment. At low temperature, bulk ErAs orders antiferromagnetically, with a Néel temperature of approximately 4 K.

The magnetic structure has commonly been described as alternating erbium moments along a ⟨111⟩ direction, requiring a doubling of the crystallographic unit cell in the magnetically ordered state.

=== Epitaxy and nanostructures ===
The lattice parameter of ErAs, approximately 5.74 Å, is close to that of GaAs, 5.653 Å, giving a lattice mismatch of about 1.5%. This allows high-quality epitaxial ErAs/GaAs heterostructures to be grown.

Because erbium has very low equilibrium solubility in GaAs, ErAs readily forms self-organized nanoparticles when erbium is codeposited during GaAs growth.

Embedded ErAs nanoparticles and nanorods retain semimetallic electronic behaviour.

ErAs inclusions have also been incorporated into GaAs/AlAs superlattices, where they scatter and localize phonons and can strongly reduce thermal transport.

== Applications ==
ErAs/GaAs nanocomposites and heterostructures have been investigated for ultrafast optoelectronics, Schottky contacts and terahertz photoconductive devices.

Carrier lifetimes in GaAs containing embedded ErAs inclusions can be reduced to the sub-picosecond range; decay times as short as approximately 200 fs have been reported.

ErAs nanoparticles have also been studied for plasmonic enhancement of infrared absorption and for modifying the electrical and thermal properties of III–V semiconductors.
