= Erbium(III) hydroxide =

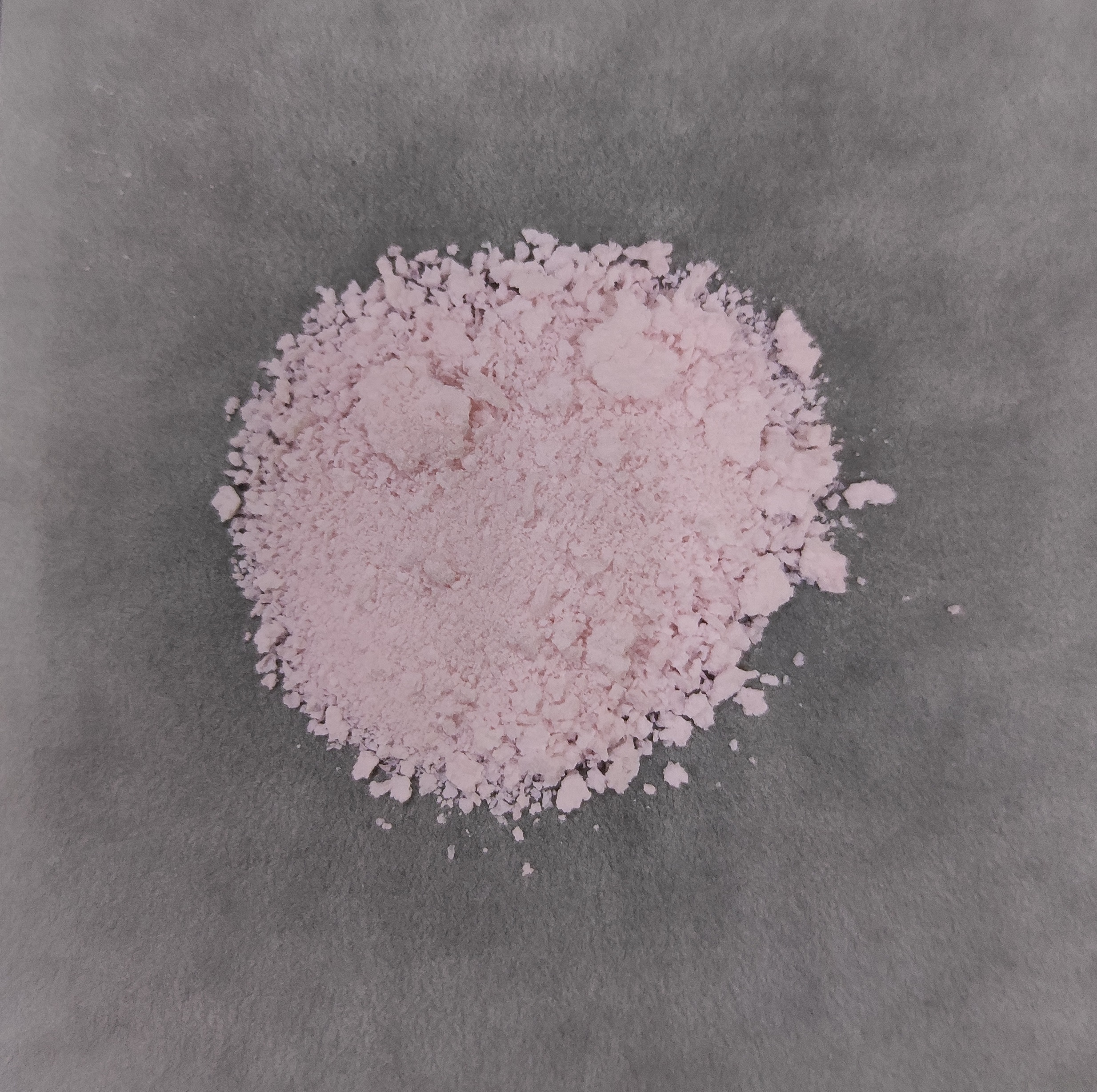

Names
- Other names erbium hydroxide

Identifiers
CAS Number	14646-16-3
3D model (JSmol)	Interactive image
ChemSpider	76295
ECHA InfoCard	100.035.163
EC Number	238-696-5
PubChem CID	84573
CompTox Dashboard (EPA)	DTXSID0065802
- InChI: InChI=1S/Er.3H2O/h;3*1H2/q+3;;;/p-3 Key: VAVZPNQZVXNCJK-UHFFFAOYSA-K
- SMILES: [OH-].[OH-].[OH-].[Er+3]

Properties
Chemical formula	ErH_{3}O_{3}
Molar mass	218.280 g·mol^{−1}
Appearance	pink solid

Related compounds
Other anions	Erbium oxide
Other cations	holmium(III) hydroxide thulium(III) hydroxide
- Except where otherwise noted, data are given for materials in their standard state (at 25 °C [77 °F], 100 kPa). Infobox references

Erbium(III) hydroxide is an inorganic compound with chemical formula Er(OH)_{3}.

== Chemical properties ==
Erbium(III) hydroxide reacts with acids and produces erbium(III) salts:

Er(OH)_{3} + 3H^{+} → Er^{3+} + 3H_{2}O

Erbium(III) hydroxide decomposes to ErO(OH) at elevated temperature. Further decomposition produces Er_{2}O_{3}.
