= Erbium(III) chloride =

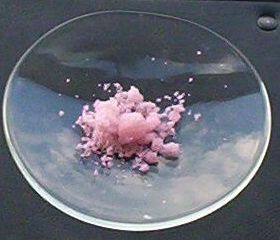
- Erbium(III) chloride hydrate photographed in sunlight

Names
- IUPAC name Erbium(III) chloride
- Other names Erbium trichloride

Identifiers
CAS Number	10138-41-7 (anhydrous)
3D model (JSmol)	Interactive image
ChemSpider	59656
ECHA InfoCard	100.030.337
EC Number	233-385-0
PubChem CID	66277
UNII	867J5QOF46
CompTox Dashboard (EPA)	DTXSID5064966
- InChI: InChI=1S/3ClH.Er/h3*1H;/q;;;+3/p-3 Key: HDGGAKOVUDZYES-UHFFFAOYSA-K; InChI=1/3ClH.Er/h3*1H;/q;;;+3/p-3 Key: HDGGAKOVUDZYES-DFZHHIFOAE
- SMILES: Cl[Er](Cl)Cl

Properties
Chemical formula	ErCl_{3} (anhydrous); ErCl_{3}·6H_{2}O (hexahydrate)
Molar mass	273.62 g/mol (anhydrous); 381.71 g/mol (hexahydrate)
Appearance	violet hygroscopic monoclinic crystals (anhydrous) pink hygroscopic crystals (hexahydrate)
Density	4.1 g/cm^{3} (anhydrous)
Melting point	776 °C (1,429 °F; 1,049 K) (anhydrous) decomposes (hexahydrate)
Boiling point	1,500 °C (2,730 °F; 1,770 K)
Solubility in water	soluble in water (anhydrous) slightly soluble in ethanol (hexahydrate)

Structure
Crystal structure	monoclinic
Space group	C2/m, No. 12
Lattice constant	a = 6.80 Å, b = 11.79 Å, c = 6.39 Å α = 90°, β = 110.7°, γ = 90°
Lattice volume (V)	479 Å^{3}
Formula units (Z)	4

Related compounds
Other anions	Erbium(III) oxide
Other cations	Holmium(III) chloride, Thulium(III) chloride
- Except where otherwise noted, data are given for materials in their standard state (at 25 °C [77 °F], 100 kPa). verify (what is ?) Infobox references

Erbium(III) chloride is a violet solid with the formula ErCl_{3}. It is used in the preparation of erbium metal.

== Preparation ==
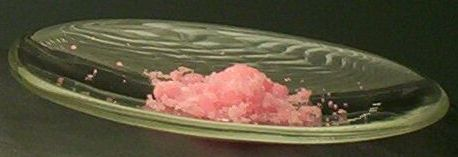
Erbium(III) chloride hydrate photographed under a fluorescent lamp

Anhydrous erbium(III) chloride can be produced by the ammonium chloride route. In the first step, erbium(III) oxide is heated with ammonium chloride to produce the ammonium salt of the pentachloride:

Er_{2}O_{3} + 10 [NH_{4}]Cl → 2 [NH_{4}]_{2}ErCl_{5} + 6 H_{2}O + 6 NH_{3}

In the second step, the ammonium chloride salt is converted to the trichloride by heating in a vacuum at 350-400 °C:

[NH_{4}]_{2}ErCl_{5} → ErCl_{3} + 2 HCl + 2 NH_{3}

== Structural data ==
Erbium(III) chloride forms crystals of the AlCl_{3} type, with monoclinic crystals and the point group C2/m.

Erbium(III) chloride hexahydrate also forms monoclinic crystals with the point group of P2/n (P2/c) - C^{4}_{2h}. In this compound, erbium is octa-coordinated to form [Er(H_{2}O)_{6}Cl_{2}]^{+} ions with the isolated Cl^{−} completing the structure.

== Optical properties ==
Erbium(III) chloride solutions show a negative nonlinear absorption effect.

== Catalytic properties ==
The use of erbium(III) chloride as a catalyst has been demonstrated in the acylation of alcohols and phenols and in an amine functionalisation of furfural. It is a catalyst for Friedel–Crafts-type reactions, and can be used in place of cerium(III) chloride for Luche reductions.
