= Erbium(III) oxide =

Erbium oxide
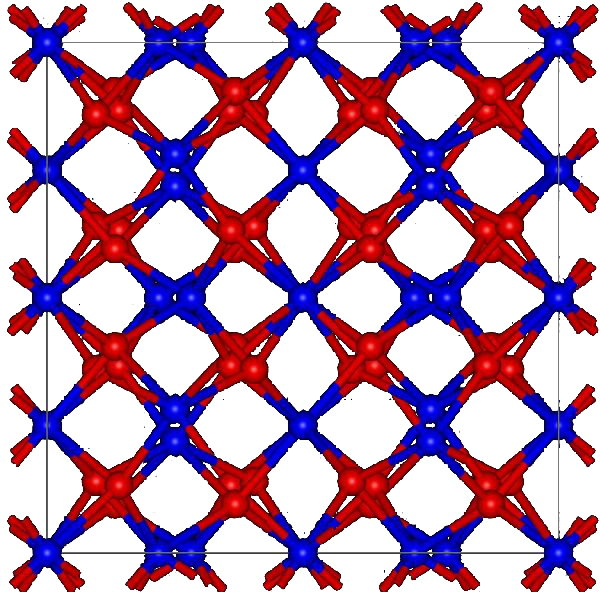
- Erbium oxide crystal structure

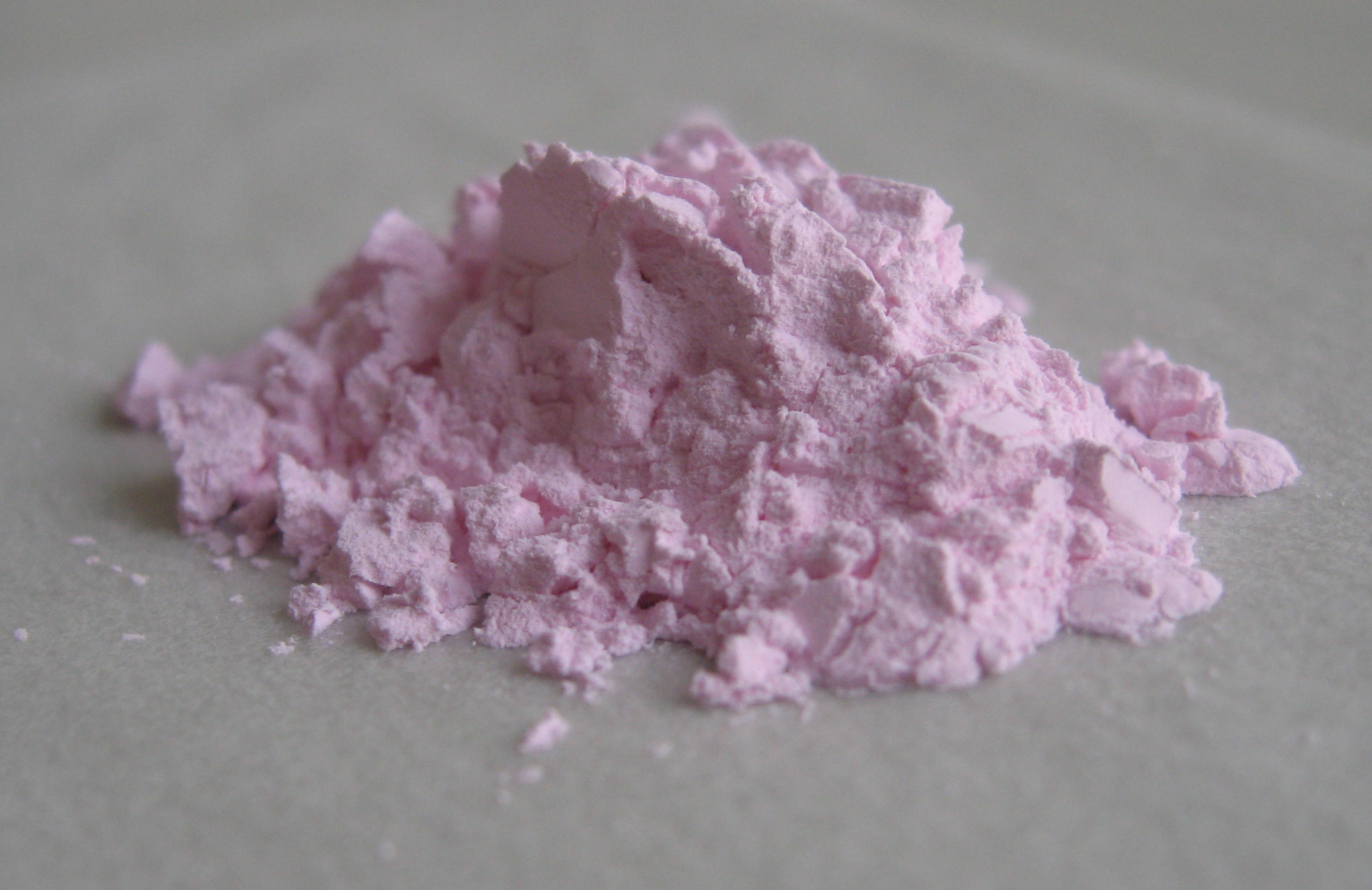

Names
- Other names Erbium oxide, erbia

Identifiers
| CAS Number | 12061-16-4 |
| 3D model (JSmol) | Interactive image; ionic: Interactive image |
| ChemSpider | 4298039 |
| ECHA InfoCard | 100.031.847 |
| EC Number | 235-045-7 |
| PubChem CID | 159426 |
| CompTox Dashboard (EPA) | DTXSID60893839 |
- InChI: InChI=1S/2Er.3O Key: VQCBHWLJZDBHOS-UHFFFAOYSA-N; InChI=1/2Er.3O/rEr2O3/c3-1-5-2-4 Key: VQCBHWLJZDBHOS-YMHUIQTEAQ
- SMILES: O=[Er]O[Er]=O; ionic: [O-2].[Er+3].[O-2].[Er+3].[O-2]

Properties
| Chemical formula | Er_{2}O_{3} |
| Molar mass | 382.56 g/mol |
| Appearance | pink crystals |
| Density | 8.64 g/cm^{3} |
| Melting point | 2,344 °C (4,251 °F; 2,617 K) |
| Boiling point | 3,290 °C (5,950 °F; 3,560 K) |
| Solubility in water | insoluble |
| Magnetic susceptibility (χ) | +73,920·10^{−6} cm^{3}/mol |

Structure
| Crystal structure | Cubic, cI80 |
| Space group | Ia-3, No. 206 |

Thermochemistry
| Heat capacity (C) | 108.5 J·mol^{−1}·K^{−1} |
| Std molar entropy (S^{⦵}_{298}) | 155.6 J·mol^{−1}·K^{−1} |
| Std enthalpy of formation (Δ_{f}H^{⦵}_{298}) | −1897.9 kJ·mol^{−1} |

Related compounds
| Other anions | Erbium(III) chloride |
| Other cations | Holmium(III) oxide, Thulium(III) oxide |
- Except where otherwise noted, data are given for materials in their standard state (at 25 °C [77 °F], 100 kPa). verify (what is ?) Infobox references

Erbium(III) oxide is the inorganic compound with the formula Er_{2}O_{3}. It is a pink paramagnetic solid. It finds uses in various optical materials.

== Structure ==
Erbium(III) oxide has a cubic structure resembling the bixbyite motif. The Er^{3+} centers are octahedral.

== Reactions ==
Erbium oxide is produced by burning erbium metal. Erbium oxide is insoluble in water but soluble in mineral acids. Er_{2}O_{3} does not readily absorb moisture and carbon dioxide from the atmosphere. It can react with acids to form the corresponding erbium(III) salts. For example, with hydrochloric acid, the oxide follows the following idealized reaction leading to erbium chloride:

Er_{2}O_{3} + 6 HCl → 2 ErCl_{3} + 3 H_{2}O

In practice, such simple acid-base reactions are accompanied by hydration:

ErCl_{3} + 9 H_{2}O → [Er(H_{2}O)_{9}]Cl_{3}

== Properties ==
One interesting property of erbium oxides is their ability to up convert photons. Photon upconversion takes place when infrared or visible radiation, low energy light, is converted to ultraviolet or violet radiation higher energy light via multiple transfer or absorption of energy. Erbium oxide nanoparticles also possess photoluminescence properties. Erbium oxide nanoparticles can be formed by applying ultrasound (20 kHz, 29 W·cm^{−2}) in the presence of multiwall carbon nanotubes. The erbium oxide nanoparticles that have been produced using ultrasound are erbium carboxioxide, hexagonal and spherical geometry erbium oxide. Each ultrasonically formed erbium oxide exhibits photoluminescence in the visible region of the electromagnetic spectrum under excitation of wavelength 379 nm in water. Hexagonal erbium oxide photoluminescence is long-lived and allows higher energy transitions (^{4}S_{3/2} – ^{4}I_{15/2}). Spherical erbium oxide does not undergo ^{4}S_{3/2} – ^{4}I_{15/2} energy transitions.

== Uses ==
The applications of Er_{2}O_{3} are varied due to their electrical, optical and photoluminescence properties. Nanoscale materials doped with Er^{3+} are of much interest because they have special particle-size-dependent optical and electrical properties. Erbium oxide doped nanoparticle materials can be dispersed in glass or plastic for display purposes, such as display monitors. The spectroscopy of Er^{3+} electronic transitions in host crystals lattices of nanoparticles combined with ultrasonically formed geometries in aqueous solution of carbon nanotubes is of great interest for synthesis of photoluminescence nanoparticles in "green" chemistry.

Erbium oxide is widely used in interferometers that require high-power lasers. These interferometers often employ erbium-doped fiber amplifiers (EDFAs) to enhance the power of the laser beams. EDFAs, which utilize erbium ions, provide low noise and high gain, making them ideal for long-distance signal transmission and high-resolution measurements in interferometry.

Erbium oxide is among the most important rare earth metals used in biomedicine. The photoluminescence property of erbium oxide nanoparticles on carbon nanotubes makes them useful in biomedical applications. For example, erbium oxide nanoparticles can be surface modified for distribution into aqueous and non-aqueous media for bioimaging. Erbium oxides are also used as gate dielectrics in semiconductor devices since it has a high dielectric constant (10–14) and a large band gap. Erbium is sometimes used as a coloring for glasses, and erbium oxide can also be used as a burnable neutron poison for nuclear fuel.

== History ==
Impure erbium(III) oxide was isolated by Carl Gustaf Mosander in 1843, and first obtained in pure form in 1905 by Georges Urbain and Charles James.
