= Erbium =

Erbium, _{68}Er
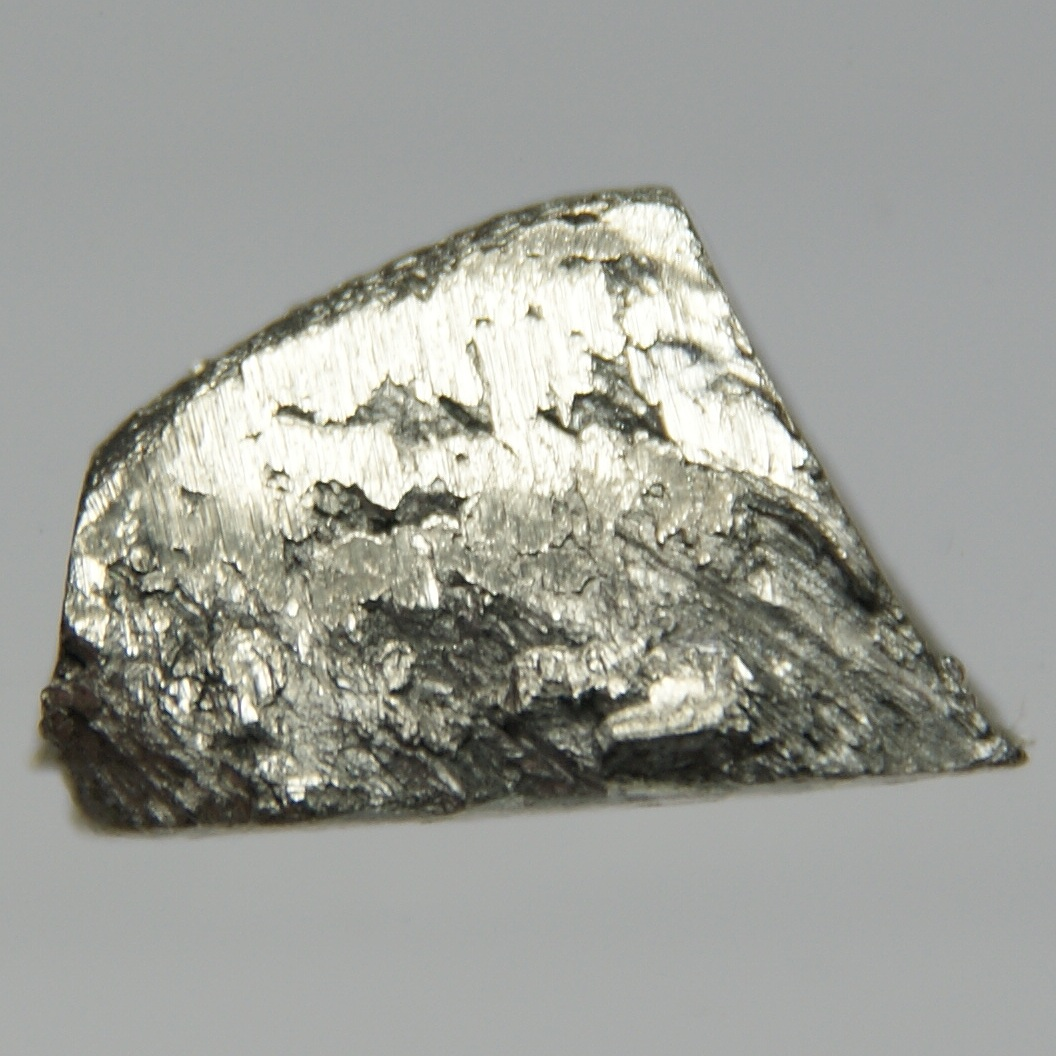

Erbium
- Pronunciation: /ˈɜːrbiəm/ (UR-bee-əm)
- Appearance: silvery white

Standard atomic weight A_{r}°(Er)
- 167.259±0.003; 167.26±0.01 (abridged)

Erbium in the periodic table
Hydrogen																															Helium
Lithium	Beryllium																									Boron	Carbon	Nitrogen	Oxygen	Fluorine	Neon
Sodium	Magnesium																									Aluminium	Silicon	Phosphorus	Sulfur	Chlorine	Argon
Potassium	Calcium															Scandium	Titanium	Vanadium	Chromium	Manganese	Iron	Cobalt	Nickel	Copper	Zinc	Gallium	Germanium	Arsenic	Selenium	Bromine	Krypton
Rubidium	Strontium															Yttrium	Zirconium	Niobium	Molybdenum	Technetium	Ruthenium	Rhodium	Palladium	Silver	Cadmium	Indium	Tin	Antimony	Tellurium	Iodine	Xenon
Caesium	Barium	Lanthanum	Cerium	Praseodymium	Neodymium	Promethium	Samarium	Europium	Gadolinium	Terbium	Dysprosium	Holmium	Erbium	Thulium	Ytterbium	Lutetium	Hafnium	Tantalum	Tungsten	Rhenium	Osmium	Iridium	Platinum	Gold	Mercury (element)	Thallium	Lead	Bismuth	Polonium	Astatine	Radon
Francium	Radium	Actinium	Thorium	Protactinium	Uranium	Neptunium	Plutonium	Americium	Curium	Berkelium	Californium	Einsteinium	Fermium	Mendelevium	Nobelium	Lawrencium	Rutherfordium	Dubnium	Seaborgium	Bohrium	Hassium	Meitnerium	Darmstadtium	Roentgenium	Copernicium	Nihonium	Flerovium	Moscovium	Livermorium	Tennessine	Oganesson
–
↑
Er
↓
Fm
holmium ← erbium → thulium
- Atomic number (Z): 68
- Group: f-block groups (no number)
- Period: period 6
- Block: f-block
- Electron configuration: [Xe] 4f^{12} 6s^{2}
- Electrons per shell: 2, 8, 18, 30, 8, 2

Physical properties
- Phase at STP: solid
- Melting point: 1802 K (1529 °C, 2784 °F)
- Boiling point: 3141 K (2868 °C, 5194 °F)
- Density (at 20° C): 9.065 g/cm^{3}
- when liquid (at m.p.): 8.86 g/cm^{3}
- Heat of fusion: 19.90 kJ/mol
- Heat of vaporization: 280 kJ/mol
- Molar heat capacity: 28.12 J/(mol·K)
- Specific heat capacity: 168.121 J/(kg·K)
Vapor pressure
P (Pa)	1	10	100	1 k	10 k	100 k
at T (K)	1504	1663	(1885)	(2163)	(2552)	(3132)

Atomic properties
- Oxidation states: common: +3; 0, +2
- Electronegativity: Pauling scale: 1.24
- Ionization energies: 1st: 589.3 kJ/mol; 2nd: 1150 kJ/mol; 3rd: 2194 kJ/mol
- Atomic radius: empirical: 176 pm
- Covalent radius: 189±6 pm
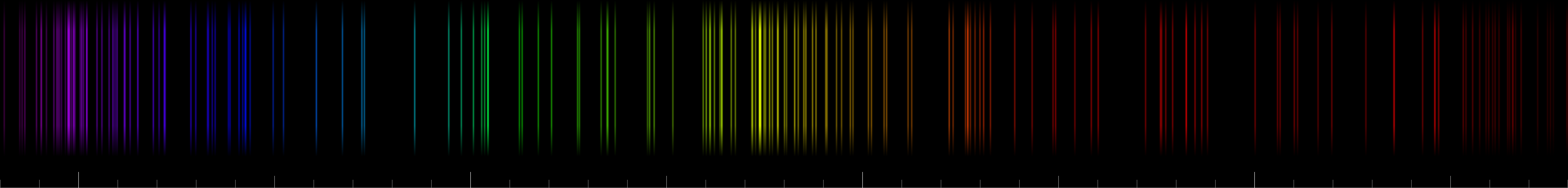
- Spectral lines of erbium

Other properties
- Natural occurrence: primordial
- Crystal structure: hexagonal close-packed (hcp) (hP2)
- Lattice constants: a = 355.93 pm c = 558.49 pm (at 20 °C)
- Thermal expansion: poly: 12.2 µm/(m⋅K) (r.t.)
- Thermal conductivity: 14.5 W/(m⋅K)
- Electrical resistivity: poly: 0.860 µΩ⋅m (r.t.)
- Magnetic ordering: paramagnetic at 300 K
- Molar magnetic susceptibility: +44300.00×10^{−6} cm^{3}/mol
- Young's modulus: 69.9 GPa
- Shear modulus: 28.3 GPa
- Bulk modulus: 44.4 GPa
- Speed of sound thin rod: 2830 m/s (at 20 °C)
- Poisson ratio: 0.237
- Vickers hardness: 430–700 MPa
- Brinell hardness: 600–1070 MPa
- CAS Number: 7440-52-0

History
- Naming: after Ytterby (Sweden), where it was mined
- Discovery: Carl Gustaf Mosander (1843)
- First isolation: Wilhelm Klemm and Heinrich Bommer (1934)

Isotopes of erbium
Main isotopes			Decay	
Isotope	abundance	half-life (t_{1/2})	mode	product
^{162}Er	0.139%	stable		
^{164}Er	1.60%	stable		
^{165}Er	synth	10.36 h	ε	^{165}Ho
^{166}Er	33.5%	stable		
^{167}Er	22.9%	stable		
^{168}Er	27.0%	stable		
^{169}Er	synth	9.39 d	β^{−}	^{169}Tm
^{170}Er	14.9%	stable		

Erbium is a chemical element; it has symbol Er and atomic number 68. A silvery-white solid metal when artificially isolated, natural erbium is always found in chemical combination with other elements. It is a lanthanide, a rare-earth element, originally found in the gadolinite mine in Ytterby, Sweden, which is the source of the element's name.

Erbium's principal uses involve its pink-colored Er^{3+} ions, which have optical fluorescent properties particularly useful in certain laser applications. Erbium-doped glasses or crystals can be used as optical amplification media, where Er^{3+} ions are optically pumped at around 980 or 1480 nm and then radiate light at 1530 nm in stimulated emission. This process results in an unusually mechanically simple laser optical amplifier for signals transmitted by fiber optics. The 1550 nm wavelength is especially important for optical communications because standard single mode optical fibers have minimal loss at this particular wavelength.

In addition to optical fiber amplifier-lasers, a large variety of medical applications (e.g. dermatology, dentistry) rely on the erbium ion's 2940 nm emission (see Er:YAG laser) when lit at another wavelength, which is highly absorbed in water in tissues, making its effect very superficial. Such shallow tissue deposition of laser energy is helpful in laser surgery, and for the efficient production of steam which produces enamel ablation by common types of dental laser.

== Characteristics ==
=== Physical properties ===
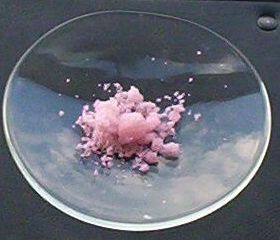
Erbium(III) chloride in sunlight, showing some pink fluorescence of Er^{3+} from natural ultraviolet.

A trivalent element, pure erbium metal is malleable (or easily shaped), soft yet stable in air, and does not oxidize as quickly as some other rare-earth metals. Its salts are rose-colored, and the element has characteristic sharp absorption spectra bands in visible light, ultraviolet, and near infrared. Otherwise it looks much like the other rare earths. Its sesquioxide is called erbia. Erbium's properties are to a degree dictated by the kind and amount of impurities present. Erbium does not play any known biological role, but is thought to be able to stimulate metabolism.

Erbium is ferromagnetic below 19 K, antiferromagnetic between 19 and 80 K and paramagnetic above 80 K.

Erbium can form propeller-shaped atomic clusters Er_{3}N, where the distance between the erbium atoms is 0.35 nm. Those clusters can be isolated by encapsulating them into fullerene molecules, as confirmed by transmission electron microscopy.

Like most rare-earth elements, erbium is usually found in the +3 oxidation state. However, it is possible for erbium to also be found in the 0, +1 and +2 oxidation states.

=== Chemical properties ===
Erbium metal retains its luster in dry air but will slowly tarnish in moist air. It burns readily to form erbium(III) oxide:

4 Er + 3 O_{2} → 2 Er_{2}O_{3}

Erbium is quite electropositive and reacts slowly with cold water and quite quickly with hot water to form erbium hydroxide:

2 Er(s) + 6 H_{2}O(l) → 2 Er(OH)_{3}(aq) + 3 H_{2}(g)

Erbium metal reacts with all the halogens:

2 Er(s) + 3 F_{2}(g) → 2 ErF_{3}(s) [pink]
2 Er(s) + 3 Cl_{2}(g) → 2 ErCl_{3}(s) [violet]
2 Er(s) + 3 Br_{2}(g) → 2 ErBr_{3}(s) [violet]
2 Er(s) + 3 I_{2}(g) → 2 ErI_{3}(s) [violet]

Erbium dissolves readily in dilute sulfuric acid to form solutions containing hydrated Er(III) ions, which exist as rose red [Er(H_{2}O)_{9}]^{3+} hydration complexes:

2 Er(s) + 3 H_{2}SO_{4}(aq) → 2 Er^{3+}(aq) + 3 SO_{4}^{2−}(aq) + 3 H_{2}(g)

=== Isotopes ===
Naturally occurring erbium is composed of 6 stable isotopes, ^{162}Er, ^{164}Er, ^{166}Er, ^{167}Er, ^{168}Er, and ^{170}Er, with ^{166}Er being the most abundant (33.503% natural abundance). Of the artificial radioisotopes characterized, the most stable are ^{169}Er with a half-life of 9.39 d, ^{172}Er with a half-life of 49.3 h, and ^{160}Er with a half-life of 28.58 h. All of the remaining radioactive isotopes have half-lives that are less than 11 h, and the majority of these have half-lives that are less than 4 minutes. This element also has 26 meta states, with the most stable being ^{149m1}Er with a half-life of 8.9 s.

The known isotopes of erbium range from ^{143}Er to ^{180}Er. The primary decay mode before the most abundant stable isotope, ^{166}Er, is electron capture, and the primary mode after is beta decay. The primary decay products before ^{166}Er are element 67 (holmium) isotopes, and the primary products after are element 69 (thulium) isotopes.

^{165}Er has been identified as useful for use in Auger therapy, as it decays via electron capture and emits no gamma radiation. It can also be used as a radioactive tracer to label antibodies and peptides, though it cannot be detected by any kind of imaging for the study of its biological distribution. The isotope can be produced via the bombardment of ^{165}Ho with beams of protons or deuterium, a reaction which is especially convenient because ^{165}Ho is a monoisotopic element and relatively inexpensive.

== Compounds ==
=== Oxides ===
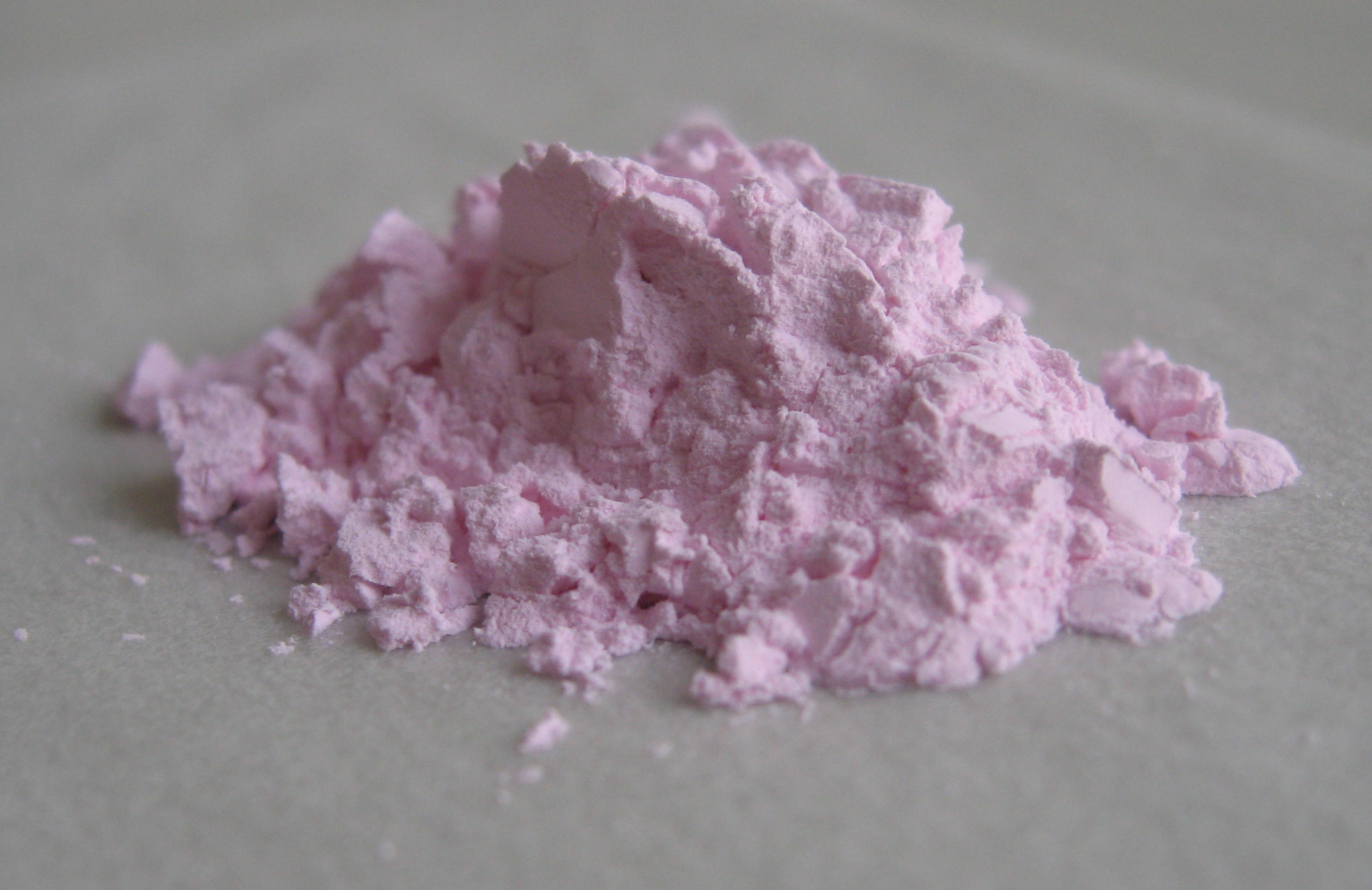
Erbium(III) oxide powder

Erbium(III) oxide (also known as erbia) is the only known oxide of erbium, first isolated by Carl Gustaf Mosander in 1843, and first obtained in pure form in 1905 by Georges Urbain and Charles James. It has a cubic structure resembling the bixbyite motif. The Er^{3+} centers are octahedral. The formation of erbium oxide is accomplished by burning erbium metal, erbium oxalate or other oxyacid salts of erbium. Erbium oxide is insoluble in water and slightly soluble in heated mineral acids. The pink-colored compound is used as a phosphor activator and to produce infrared-absorbing glass.

=== Halides ===
Erbium(III) fluoride is a pinkish powder that can be produced by reacting erbium(III) nitrate and ammonium fluoride. It can be used to make infrared light-transmitting materials and up-converting luminescent materials, and is an intermediate in the production of erbium metal prior to its reduction with calcium. Erbium(III) chloride is a violet compounds that can be formed by first heating erbium(III) oxide and ammonium chloride to produce the ammonium salt of the pentachloride ((NH_{4})_{2}ErCl_{5}) then heating it in a vacuum at 350-400 °C. It forms crystals of the aluminium chloride type, with monoclinic crystals and the point group C2/m. Erbium(III) chloride hexahydrate also forms monoclinic crystals with the point group of P2/n (P2/c) - C^{4}_{2h}. In this compound, erbium is octa-coordinated to form [Er(H_{2}O)_{6}Cl_{2}]^{+} ions with the isolated Cl^{−} completing the structure.

Erbium(III) bromide is a violet solid. It is used, like other metal bromide compounds, in water treatment, chemical analysis and for certain crystal growth applications. Erbium(III) iodide is a slightly pink compound that is insoluble in water. It can be prepared by directly reacting erbium with iodine.

=== Organoerbium compounds ===
Organoerbium compounds are very similar to those of the other lanthanides, as they all share an inability to undergo π backbonding. They are thus mostly restricted to the mostly ionic cyclopentadienides (isostructural with those of lanthanum) and the σ-bonded simple alkyls and aryls, some of which may be polymeric.

== History ==
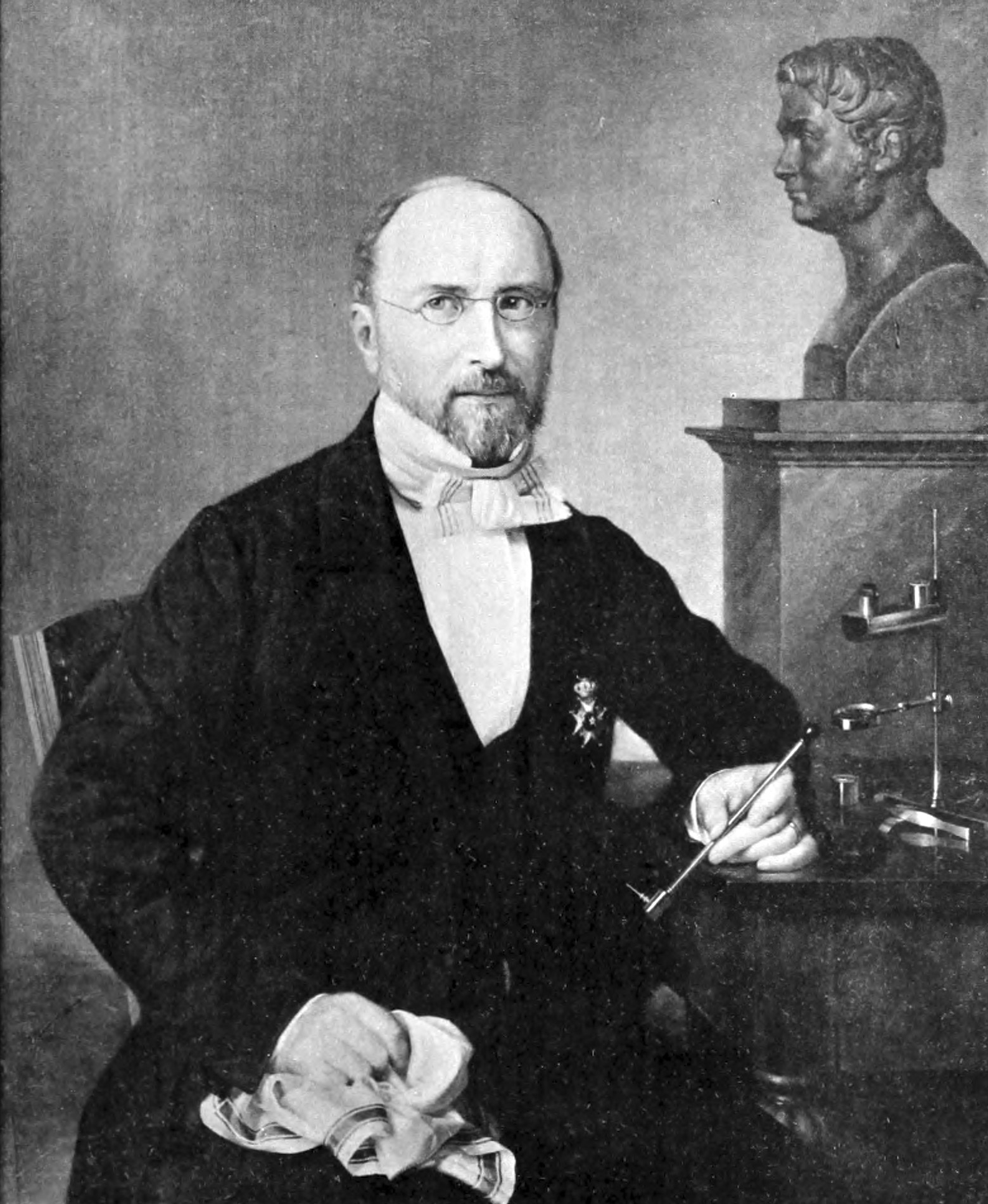
Carl Gustaf Mosander, the scientist who discovered erbium, lanthanum and terbium

Erbium (for Ytterby, a village in Sweden) was discovered by Carl Gustaf Mosander in 1843. Mosander was working with a sample of what was thought to be the single metal oxide yttria, derived from the mineral gadolinite. He discovered that the sample contained at least two metal oxides in addition to pure yttria, which he named "erbia" and "terbia" after the village of Ytterby where the gadolinite had been found. Mosander was not certain of the purity of the oxides and later tests confirmed his uncertainty. Not only did the "yttria" contain yttrium, erbium, and terbium; in the ensuing years, chemists, geologists and spectroscopists discovered five additional elements: ytterbium, scandium, thulium, holmium, and gadolinium.

Erbia and terbia, however, were confused at this time. Marc Delafontaine, a Swiss spectroscopist, mistakenly switched the names of the two elements in his work separating the oxides erbia and terbia. After 1860, terbia was renamed erbia and after 1877 what had been known as erbia was renamed terbia. Fairly pure Er_{2}O_{3} was independently isolated in 1905 by Georges Urbain and Charles James. Reasonably pure erbium metal was not produced until 1934 when Wilhelm Klemm and Heinrich Bommer reduced the anhydrous chloride with potassium vapor.

== Occurrence ==
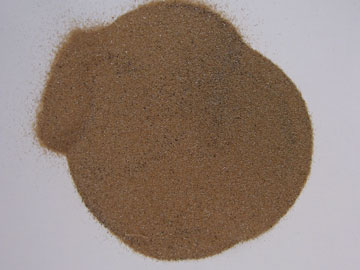
Monazite sand

The concentration of erbium in the Earth's crust is about 2.8 mg/kg and in seawater 0.9 ng/L. (Concentration of less abundant elements may vary with location by several orders of magnitude making the relative abundance unreliable). Like other rare earths, this element is never found as a free element in nature but is found in monazite and bastnäsite ores. It has historically been very difficult and expensive to separate rare earths from each other in their ores but ion-exchange chromatography methods developed in the late 20th century have greatly reduced the cost of production of all rare-earth metals and their chemical compounds.

The principal commercial sources of erbium are from the minerals xenotime and euxenite, and most recently, the ion adsorption clays of southern China. Consequently, China has now become the principal global supplier of this element. In the high-yttrium versions of these ore concentrates, yttrium is about two-thirds of the total by weight, and erbia is about 4–5%. When the concentrate is dissolved in acid, the erbia liberates enough erbium ion to impart a distinct and characteristic pink color to the solution. This color behavior is similar to what Mosander and the other early workers in the lanthanides saw in their extracts from the gadolinite minerals of Ytterby.

== Production ==
Crushed minerals are attacked by hydrochloric or sulfuric acid that transforms insoluble rare-earth oxides into soluble chlorides or sulfates. The acidic filtrates are partially neutralized with caustic soda (sodium hydroxide) to pH 3–4. Thorium precipitates out of solution as hydroxide and is removed. After that the solution is treated with ammonium oxalate to convert rare earths into their insoluble oxalates. The oxalates are converted to oxides by annealing. The oxides are dissolved in nitric acid that excludes one of the main components, cerium, whose oxide is insoluble in HNO_{3}. The solution is treated with magnesium nitrate to produce a crystallized mixture of double salts of rare-earth metals. The salts are separated by ion exchange. In this process, rare-earth ions are sorbed onto suitable ion-exchange resin by exchange with hydrogen, ammonium or cupric ions present in the resin. The rare earth ions are then selectively washed out by suitable complexing agent. Erbium metal is obtained from its oxide or salts by heating with calcium at 1450 °C under argon atmosphere.

== Applications ==
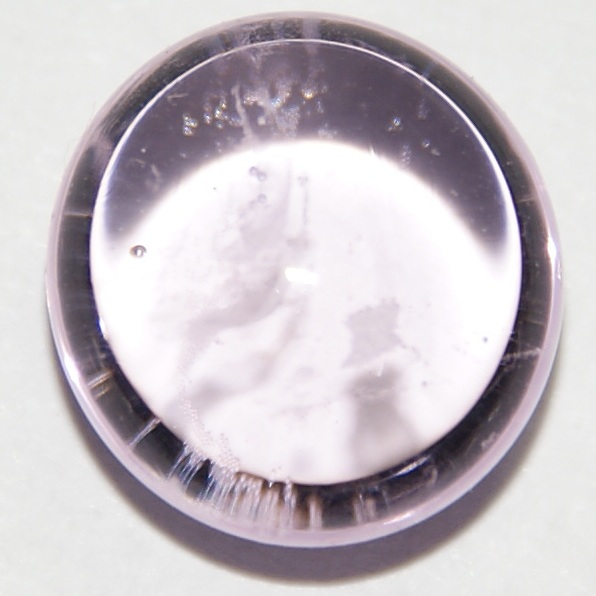
Erbium-colored glass

=== Lasers and optics ===
A large variety of medical applications (i.e., dermatology, dentistry) utilize erbium ion's 2940 nm emission (see Er:YAG laser), which is highly absorbed in water (absorption coefficient about 12000/cm). Such shallow tissue deposition of laser energy is necessary for laser surgery, and the efficient production of steam for laser enamel ablation in dentistry. Common applications of erbium lasers in dentistry include ceramic cosmetic dentistry and removal of brackets in orthodontic braces; such laser applications have been noted as more time-efficient than performing the same procedures with rotary dental instruments.

Erbium-doped optical silica-glass fibers are the active element in erbium-doped fiber amplifiers (EDFAs), which are widely used in optical communications. The same fibers can be used to create fiber lasers. In order to work efficiently, erbium-doped fiber is usually co-doped with glass modifiers/homogenizers, often aluminium or phosphorus. These dopants help prevent clustering of Er ions and transfer the energy more efficiently between excitation light (also known as optical pump) and the signal. Co-doping of optical fiber with Er and Yb is used in high-power Er/Yb fiber lasers. Erbium can also be used in erbium-doped waveguide amplifiers.

=== Other applications ===
When added to vanadium as an alloy, erbium lowers hardness and improves workability. An erbium-nickel alloy Er_{3}Ni has an unusually high specific heat capacity at liquid-helium temperatures and is used in cryocoolers; a mixture of 65% Er_{3}Co and 35% Er_{0.9}Yb_{0.1}Ni by volume improves the specific heat capacity even more.

Erbium oxide has a pink color, and is sometimes used as a colorant for glass, cubic zirconia and porcelain. The glass is then often used in sunglasses and jewellery, or where infrared absorption is needed.

Erbium is used in nuclear technology in neutron-absorbing control rods. or as a burnable poison in nuclear fuel design.

== Biological role and precautions ==
Erbium does not have a biological role, but erbium salts can stimulate metabolism. Humans consume 1 milligram of erbium a year on average. The highest concentration of erbium in humans is in the bones, but there is also erbium in the human kidneys and liver.

Erbium is slightly toxic if ingested, but erbium compounds are generally not toxic. Ionic erbium behaves similar to ionic calcium, and can potentially bind to proteins such as calmodulin. When introduced into the body, nitrates of erbium, similar to other rare earth nitrates, increase triglyceride levels in the liver and cause leakage of hepatic (liver-related) enzymes to the blood, though they uniquely (along with gadolinium and dysprosium nitrates) increase RNA polymerase II activity. Ingestion and inhalation are the main routes of exposure to erbium and other rare earths, as they do not diffuse through unbroken skin.

Metallic erbium in dust form presents a fire and explosion hazard.
