= Terbium compounds =

Chemical compounds with at least one terbium atom

The terbium compounds are excited by UV light at 365 nm and emits green light.

Terbium compounds are compounds formed by the lanthanide metal terbium (Tb). Terbium generally exhibits the +3 oxidation state in these compounds, such as in TbCl_{3}, Tb(NO_{3})_{3} and Tb(CH_{3}COO)_{3}. Compounds with terbium in the +4 oxidation state are also known, such as TbO_{2} and BaTbF_{6}. Terbium can also form compounds in the 0, +1 and +2 oxidation states.

The trivalent terbium ion (Tb^{3+}) is generally colorless in aqueous solution, and when it is irradiated by certain wavelengths of ultraviolet light (such as 254 nm or 365 nm) in solution or crystal form, it will emit green fluorescence. This property has given rise to applications in fields such as optics. The tetravalent terbium ion (Tb^{4+}) is non-luminescent and its coexistence with Tb^{3+} will reduce the green emission of Tb^{3+}.

== Properties of terbium compounds ==
Formula	appearance	symmetry	space group	No	a (nm)	b (nm)	c (nm)	density, g/cm^{3}
TbBr_{3}	white powder (hexahydrate)	trigonal	R3̅	148				4.62
TbCl_{3}	white powder	hexagonal	P6_{3}/m	176				4.35
TbF_{3}	white solid	hexagonal			7.035		6.875	7.23
Tb(OH)_{3}	white solid							
TbI_{3}	hydroscopic crystals	trigonal	R3̅	148				5.2
Tb(NO_{3})_{3}	colourless crystals (hexahydrate)	monoclinic	P2^{1}/c	14	1.2870	1.6590	2.8723	
Tb_{2}O_{3}	white crystals	cubic	Ia3̅	206		1.057		7.91
TbO_{2}	dark-coloured	cubic						
TbP	black crystals	cubic	Fm3̅m	225	0.56402			6.82
Tb_{4}O_{7}	dark brown-black solid	orthorhombic	R3̅	148	6.5082			7.3
Tb_{11}O_{20}	solid	triclinic	P1̅	2	6.50992	9.8298	6.4878	
TbAsO_{4}	solid	orthorhombic	Fddd	70	7.09		6.32	
TbAsO_{4}	solid	tetragonal	I41/amd	141	10.081	9.957	6.321	
TbSbO_{4}	green (under UV light)	monoclinic	P2_{1}/m	11				
TbSe	yellow-red solid	cubic	Fm3̅m	225				

== Chalcogenides ==
=== Oxides ===
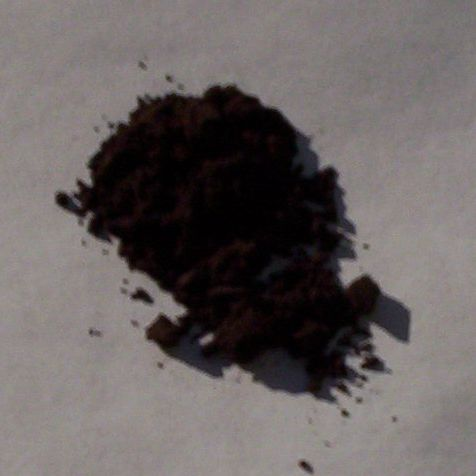
Terbium(III,IV) oxide

Terbium has a variety of oxides. The most easily obtained is terbium(III,IV) oxide, which can be produced by the decomposition of terbium compounds such as the hydroxide, the oxalate and the p-aminobenzoate. Terbium(III,IV) oxide, because the oxide contains both trivalent terbium and tetravalent terbium, can be decomposed by reacting with nitric acid to produce terbium(III) nitrate, releasing oxygen in the progress:

2 Tb_{4}O_{7} + 24 HNO_{3} → 8 Tb(NO_{3})_{3} + 12 H_{2}O + O_{2}↑

It is refluxed in a mixture of acetic acid and hydrochloric acid, which can separate trivalent and tetravalent terbium:

Tb_{4}O_{7} + 6 HCl → 2 TbO_{2} + 2 TbCl_{3} + 3 H_{2}O

It reacts with dicyandiamide at a high temperature to obtain Tb_{2}O_{2}CN_{2}.

Another common oxide of terbium is terbium(III) oxide, which can be obtained from the reduction of hydrogen from terbium(III,IV) oxide at 1300 °C. A p-type semiconductor is formed after doping with calcium.

Terbium(IV) oxide can be prepared by treating terbium(III,IV) oxide with dilute hydrochloric acid, its hydrate TbO_{2}·xH_{2}O can be obtained by oxidizing terbium(III) hydroxide with potassium persulfate in the presence of silver nitrate. Terbium(IV) oxide can form mixed crystals with praseodymium(IV) oxide.

=== Other chalcogenides ===
Terbium(III) sulfide is one of the sulfides of terbium, which can be obtained by reacting with sulfur in a stoichiometric ratio. It can also be obtained by reacting terbium(III,IV) oxide with carbon disulfide and hydrogen sulfide at high temperature. It reacts with hydrofluoric acid solution to give terbium(III) fluoride hemihydrate. Terbium(III) selenide can be obtained by the reaction of terbium polyselenide TbSe_{1.9} with metal terbium, which can form black needle-like crystals with U_{2}S_{3} structure and space group Pnma. Terbium monochalcogenides, TbZ (Z = S, Se or Te), can be prepared by directly reacting terbium with the corresponding chalcogen. These chalcogenides are black and have a NaCl structure. They have metallic conductivity and consist of Ln^{3+} and Z^{2-} ions with 1 electron from each cation delocalized in a conduction band.

== Halides and halogen complexes ==
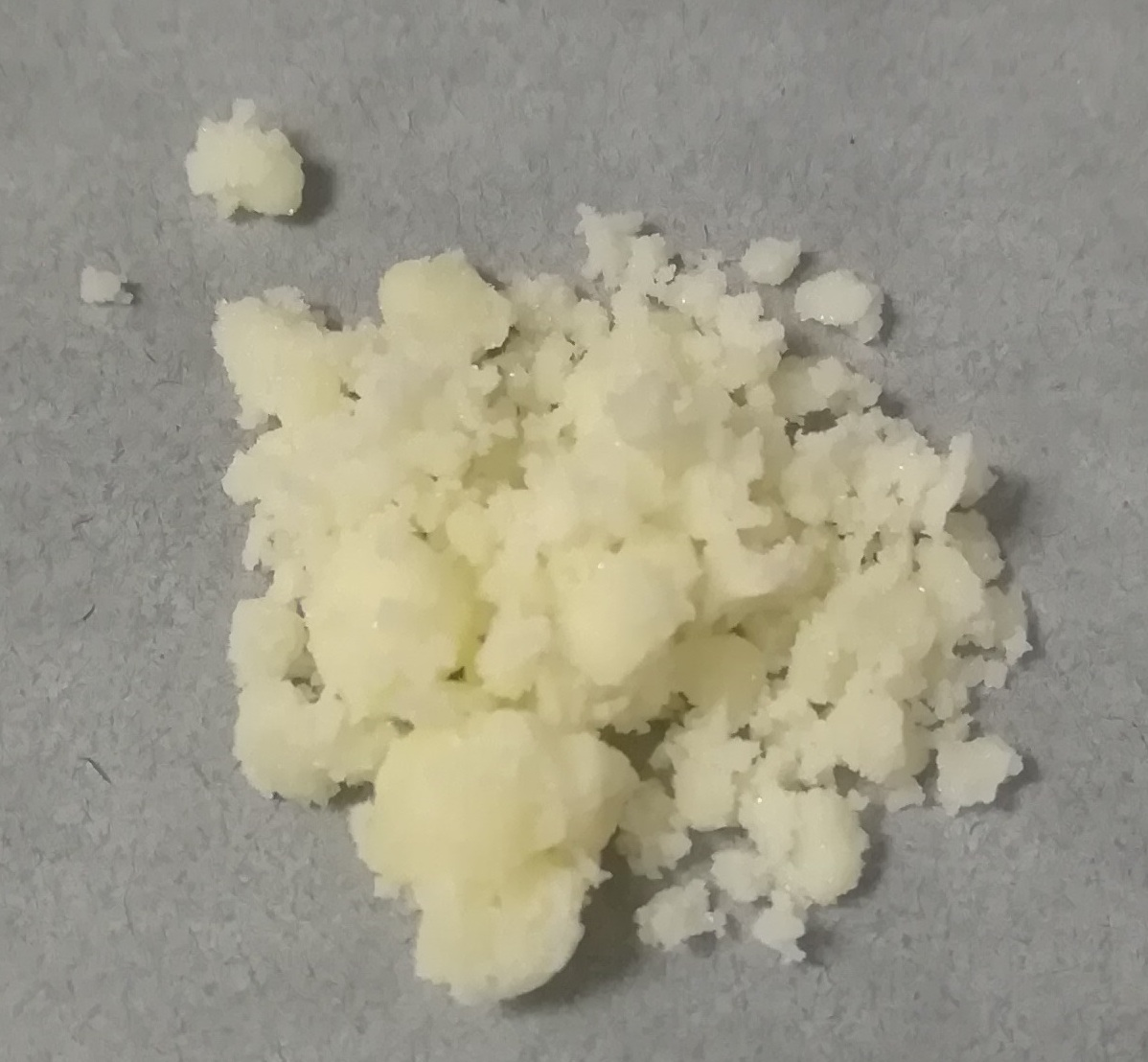
Terbium(III) chloride hexahydrate

Terbium can form four trihalides in the form TbX_{3} (X=F, Cl, Br, I), which, except the fluoride, are easily soluble in water, and are strong electrolytes in water. They can be prepared by reacting terbium with the corresponding halogen:

2Tb (s) + 3F_{2} (g) → 2TbF_{3} (s) [a white substance]
2Tb (s) + 3Cl_{2} (g) → 2TbCl_{3} (s) [a white substance]
2Tb (s) + 3Br_{2} (g) → 2TbBr_{3} (s) [a white substance]
2Tb (s) + 3I_{2} (g) → 2TbI_{3} (s)

Anhydrous terbium halides can be prepared by reacting oxides or halides hydrates:

Tb_{2}O_{3} + 6 NH_{4}Cl → 2 TbCl_{3} + 3 H_{2}O + 6 NH_{3}↑
TbCl_{3}·6H_{2}O + 6 SOCl_{2} → TbCl_{3} + 6 SO_{2}↑ + 12 HCl↑

Terbium(II) halides are obtained by annealing Tb(III) halides in presence of metallic Tb in tantalum containers. Terbium also forms a sesquichloride Tb_{2}Cl_{3}, which can be further reduced to TbCl by annealing at 800 °C. This terbium(I) chloride forms platelets with layered graphite-like structure.

Terbium(IV) fluoride is the only halide that tetravalent terbium can form, and has strong oxidizing properties. It is also a strong fluorinating agent, emitting relatively pure atomic fluorine when heated, rather than the mixture of fluoride vapors emitted from cobalt(III) fluoride or cerium(IV) fluoride. It can be obtained by reacting terbium(III) chloride or terbium(III) fluoride with fluorine gas at 320 °C:

2 TbF_{3} + F_{2} → 2 TbF_{4}

When TbF_{4} and CsF is mixed in a stoichiometric ratio, in a fluorine gas atmosphere, CsTbF_{5} is obtained. It is an orthorhombic crystal, with space group Cmca, with a layered structure composed of [TbF_{8}]^{4−} and 11-coordinated Cs^{+}. The compound BaTbF_{6} can be prepared in a similar method. It is an orthorhombic crystal, with space group Cmma. The compound [TbF_{8}]^{4−} also exists.

== Organoterbium compounds ==
Organoterbium compounds are a class of organic metal compounds containing Tb-C bonds. The cyclopentadienyl complexes of terbium were studied in the early stage. They can be prepared by the reaction of sodium cyclopentadienide and anhydrous terbium halide in tetrahydrofuran, such as:

TbCl_{3} + 3 C_{5}H_{5}Na → (C_{5}H_{5})3Tb + 3 NaCl
TbI_{2} + 2 (C_{5}HiPr_{4})Na → (C_{5}HiPr_{4})_{2}Tb + 2 NaI

However, this compound has limited usage and academic interest.

Like the other lanthanides, metal-carbon σ bonds are found in alkyls of terbium such as [TbMe_{6}]^{3−} and Tb[CH(SiMe_{3})_{2}]_{3}. The alkyls and aryls can be prepared by metathesis in tetrahydrofuran on ether solutions:

TbCl_{3} + 3 LiR → TbR_{3} + 3 LiCl
TbCl_{3} + 4 LiR → Li[TbR_{4}] + 3 LiCl_{3}

== Other compounds ==
=== Oxoacid salts ===
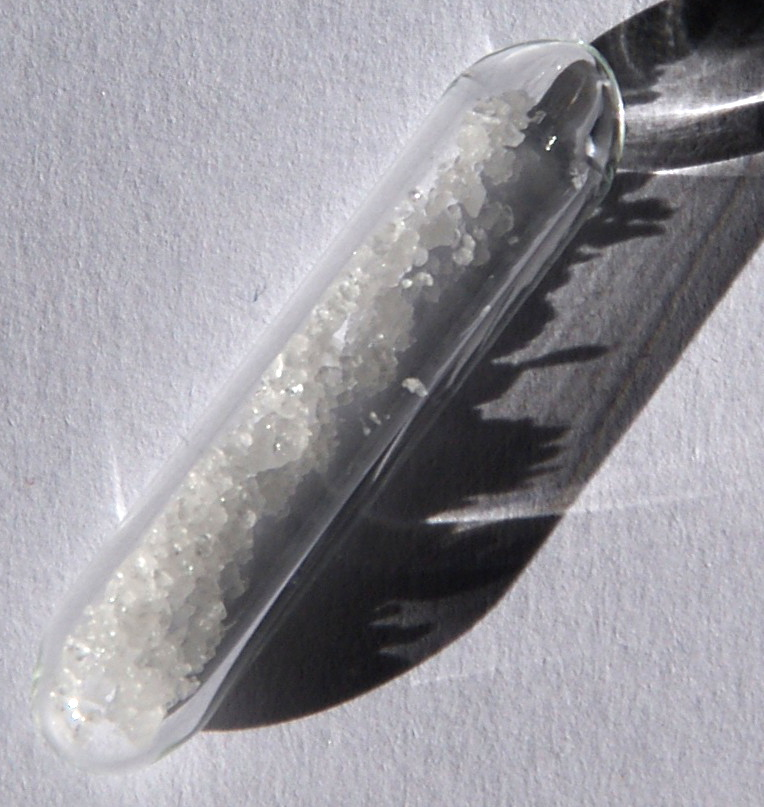
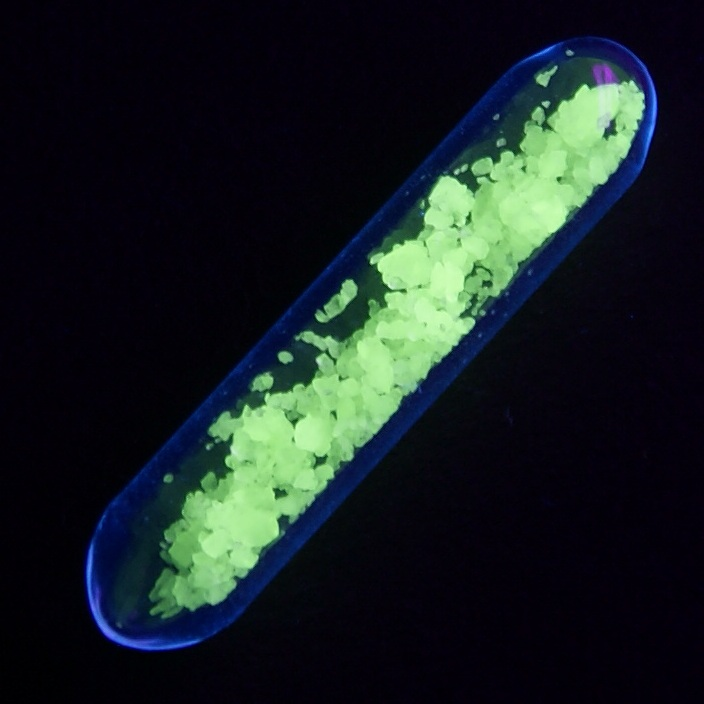
Terbium(III) sulfate (Tb_{2}(SO_{4})_{3}) is a colorless crystal (left) that fluoresces green under ultraviolet light (right).

Terbium(III) acetate reacts with caesium carbonate to form a precipitate of terbium hydroxycarbonate, which reacts with excess caesium carbonate and dissolves again. The reaction was irradiated with ultraviolet light with a wavelength of 365 nm, which produces the characteristic green light of terbium.

Terbium(III) sulfate can be obtained by the reaction of terbium(III,IV) oxide and concentrated sulfuric acid. It can crystallize colorless octahydrate crystals in water, which is isostructural with the corresponding praseodymium compound. The anhydrate can be obtained by heating the octahydrate, and an exothermic reaction occurs when the anhydrate is rehydrated. Terbium(III) hydroxide can be obtained by reacting terbium with water. It reacts with acids to produce terbium(III) salts. It decomposes to TbO(OH) at an elevated temperature, and upon further heating, will decompose to terbium(III) oxide.

Terbium(III) nitrate can be obtained by reacting terbium(III) oxide with nitric acid and crystallizing. The crystals are dried with 45~55% sulfuric acid to obtain the hexahydrate. The basic salt TbONO_{3} can be obtained by heating the hydrate, and its anhydrate can be obtained by the reaction of terbium(III) oxide and dinitrogen tetroxide. Terbium(III) phosphate can be obtained by the reaction of diammonium hydrogen phosphate and terbium(III) nitrate, and the reaction produces a hexagonal monohydrate, which can emit the characteristic green light of terbium (543 nm) under the excitation of 355 nm wavelength. It can also be obtained by the reaction of sodium phosphate and terbium(III) chloride in solution, and the precipitated dihydrate is calcined at 800 °C to obtain the anhydrous form. Terbium(III) arsenate is an orthorhombic crystal at 77 K with space group Fddd, and undergoes a phase transition at 27.7 K to form a tetragonal crystal with space group I4_{1}/amd, which is a ferromagnet below 1.5 K. It can be produced by reacting sodium arsenate and terbium(III) chloride. Terbium(III) antimonate (TbSbO_{4}) is a monoclinic crystal with space group P2_{1}/m (No. 11).

Terbium(III) carbonate can be obtained by reacting terbium(III) chloride with saturated carbon dioxide solution in sodium bicarbonate, and the product also needs to be washed with water saturated with carbon dioxide. The germanates Tb^{III}_{13}(GeO_{4})_{6}O_{7}(OH) and K_{2}Tb^{IV}Ge_{2}O_{7} can be synthesized at high temperature and pressure, and they are colorless crystals of trigonal and monoclinic systems, respectively. The tetrahydrate of terbium(III) acetate can lose hydration at 60 °C, obtaining the anhydrate at 180 °C, which starts to decompose at 220 °C, forming terbium oxide at 650 °C.

Terbium borate can be obtained by reacting terbium oxide with boric acid:

2 Tb_{4}O_{7} + 8 H_{3}BO_{3} → 8 TbBO_{3} + 12 H_{2}O + O_{2}↑

The single crystal of its hexagonal phase can be obtained by the Czochralski method; it can also form a solid of the triclinic system, which can be obtained by the sol-gel method. The composite borates TbFe_{3}(BO_{3})_{4} and TbAl_{3}(BO_{3})_{4} can also be obtained by a similar method. Terbium(III) oxide, terbium(III) chloride and boron trioxide react in a caesium chloride solution to obtain terbium oxychloride borate Tb_{4}O_{4}Cl(BO_{3}), which is a monoclinic crystal with space group P2_{1}/n. Both aluminate Tb_{3}Al_{5}O_{12} and gallate Tb_{3}Ga_{5}O_{12} can be used as magneto-optical materials.

=== Pnictides ===
All the terbium pnictides form crystals of the cubic crystal system, with the space group of Fm3m. Terbium phosphide can be obtained by reacting sodium phosphide and anhydrous terbium(III) chloride at 700 to 800˚C. It undergoes a phase transition at 40 GPa from a NaCl-structure to a CsCl-structure. It can be sintered with zinc sulfide to make a green phosphor layer.

== Alloys ==
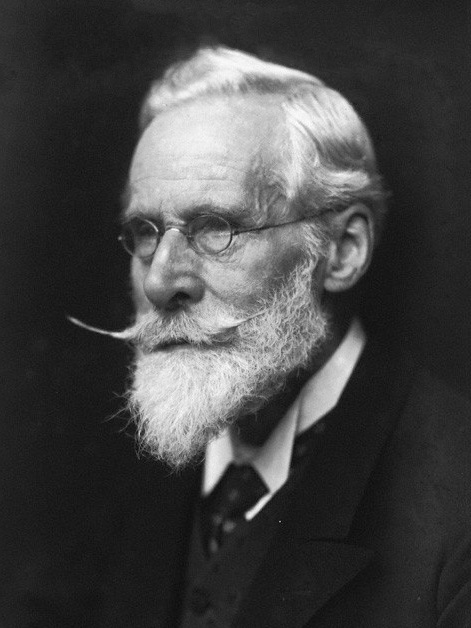
Sir William Crookes, the discoverer of victorium, in 1906

=== Terfenol-D ===
Terfenol-D is an alloy of terbium, iron and dysprosium, with the formula of Tb_{x}Dy_{1−x}Fe_{2}. It was initially developed in the 1970s by the Naval Ordnance Laboratory in the United States. The technology for manufacturing the material efficiently was developed in the 1980s at Ames Laboratory under a U.S. Navy-funded program. It has the highest magnetostriction of any alloy, with up to 0.002 m/m at saturation. It possess nearly zero magnetocrystalline anisotropy and so exhibits very large magnetostriction at low magnetic fields. Terfenol-D is mostly used for its magnetostrictive properties, in which it changes shape when exposed to magnetic fields in a process called magnetization. Magnetic heat treatment is shown to improve the magnetostrictive properties of Terfenol-D at low compressive stress for certain ratios of Tb and Dy.

=== Victorium ===
Victorium (also called monium, meaning "alone", because its spectral lines stood alone at the end of the ultraviolet spectrum) is an alloy of gadolinium and terbium, which was misidentified as a chemical element in 1898 by the English chemist William Crookes. He identified the new substance, based on an analysis of the unique phosphorescence and other ultraviolet-visible spectral phenomena, as a new chemical element. However, in 1905, French chemist Georges Urbain had proven that to be false, and in fact, a impurity of gadolinium and terbium.

== Applications ==
Terbium compounds do not have many applications. However, compounds of trivalent terbium can emit green light under excitation, such as terbium(III) oxide which can be used in cathode-ray tube televisions. Terbium compounds are also used in optics due to this property. In addition, terbium compounds have other applications. For example, TbFe_{2}-based compounds can be used as magnetostrictive materials, dielectric Tb_{3}Ga_{5}O_{12} and Tb_{3}Al_{5}O_{12} can be used as magneto-optical materials, terbium(III) fluoride is used for the production of fluoride glasses and electroluminescent thin films and luminescent zinc sulfide and terbium gatifloxacin can be used as drugs. Terbium phosphide is a semiconductor used in high power, high frequency applications and in laser diodes and other photo diodes. CePO_{4}:Tb (Cerium phosphate doped terbium) has potential application in biological imaging and cellular labeling.

Alloys containing terbium are used in the production of electronic devices, mostly as a component of Terfenol-D. The alloy is used in actuators, in sensors, in the SoundBug device (its first commercial application), hydraulic valve drivers and other magnetomechanical devices. It is also used in naval sonar systems. Its strain is also larger than that of another normally used material (PZT8), which allows Terfenol-D transducers to reach greater depths for ocean explorations than past transducers. Its low Young's Modulus brings some complications due to compression at large depths, which are overcome in transducer designs that may reach 1000 ft in depth and only lose a small amount of accuracy of around 1 dB. Due to its high temperature range, Terfenol-D is also useful in deep hole acoustic transducers where the environment may reach high pressure and temperatures like oil holes. Terfenol-D may also be used for hydraulic valve drivers due to its high strain and high force properties. Similarly, magnetostrictive actuators have also been considered for use in fuel injectors for diesel engines because of the high stresses that can be produced.

== Pictures of terbium compounds ==
Terbium compounds
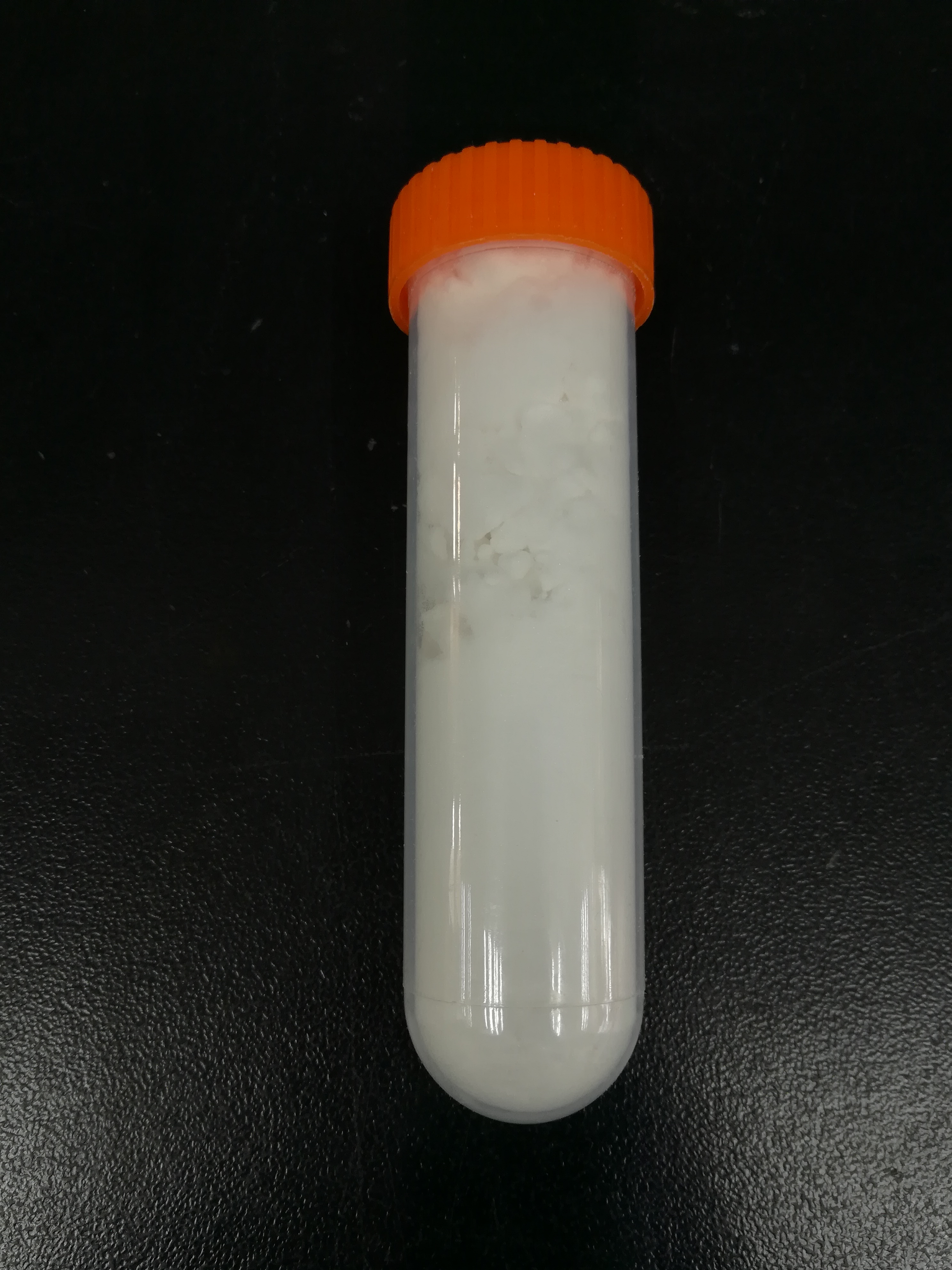
Terbium acetate tetrahydrate (Tb(CH_{3}COO)_{3}·4H_{2}O)

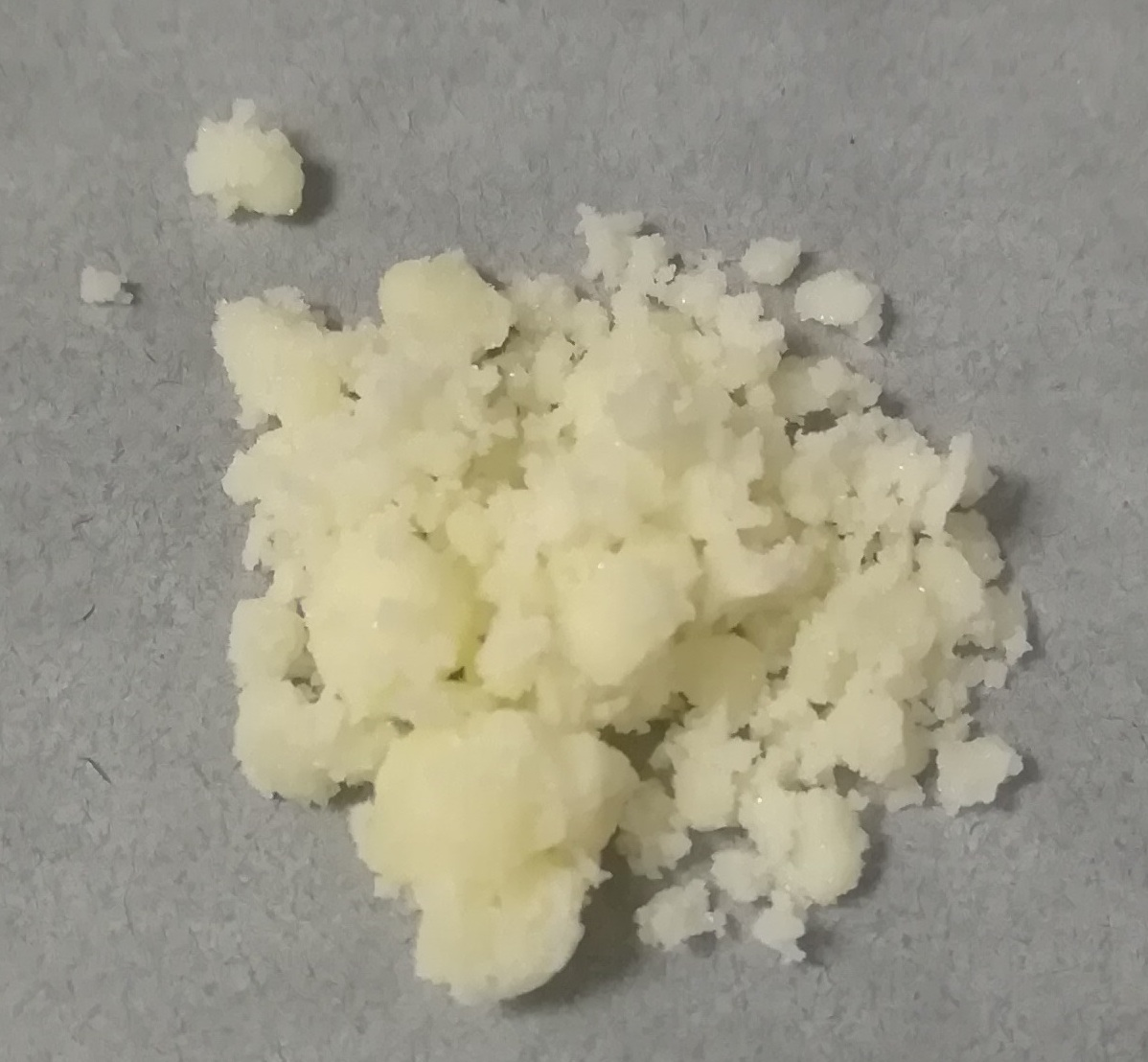
Terbium(III) chloride hexahydrate (TbCl_{3}·6H_{2}O)

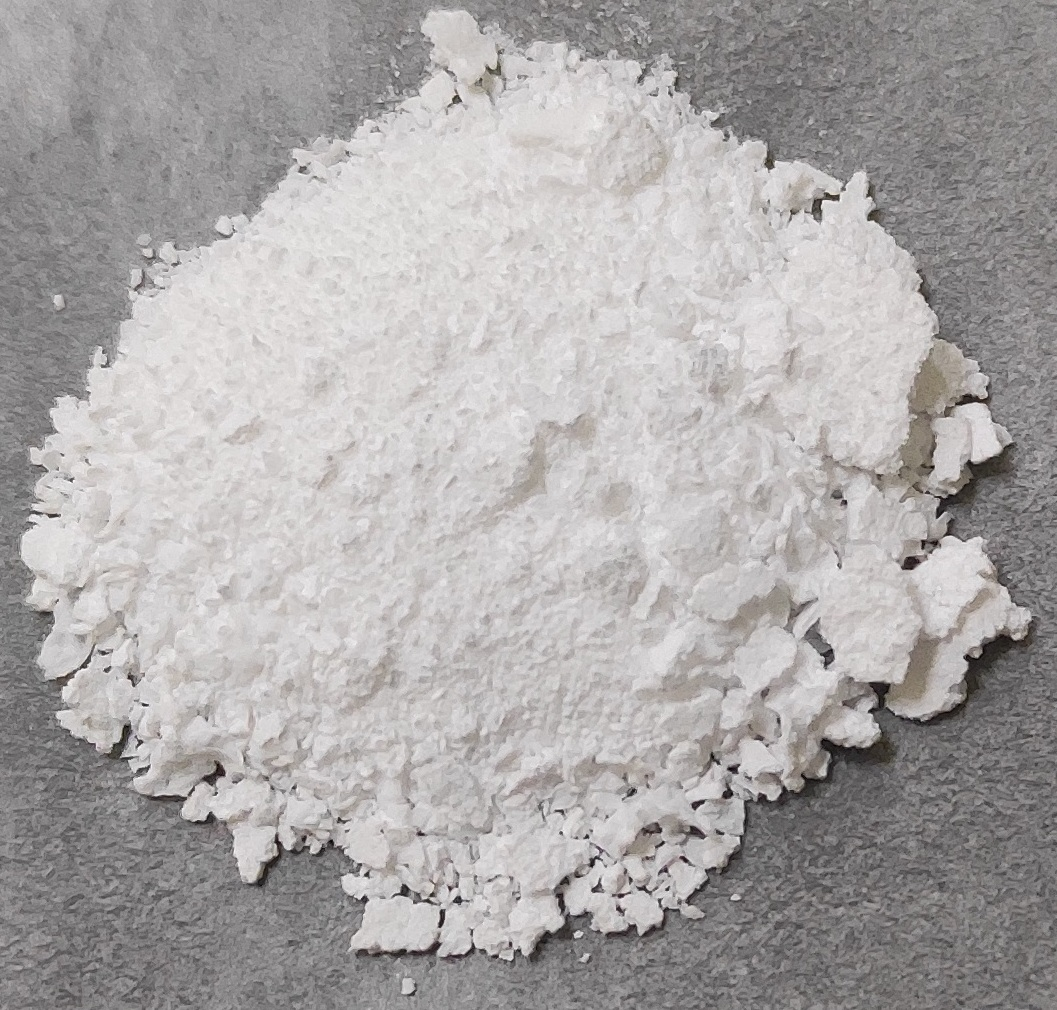
Terbium(III) hydroxide (Tb(OH)_{3})

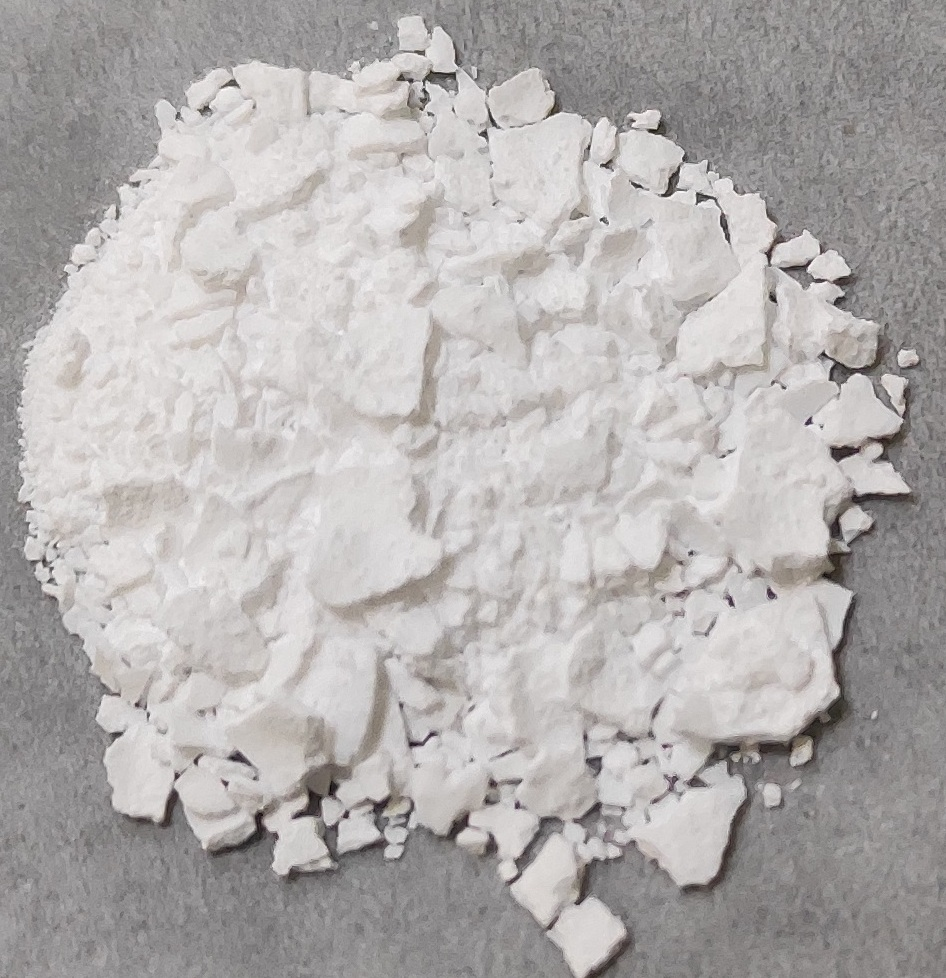
Terbium(III) phosphate (TbPO_{4})

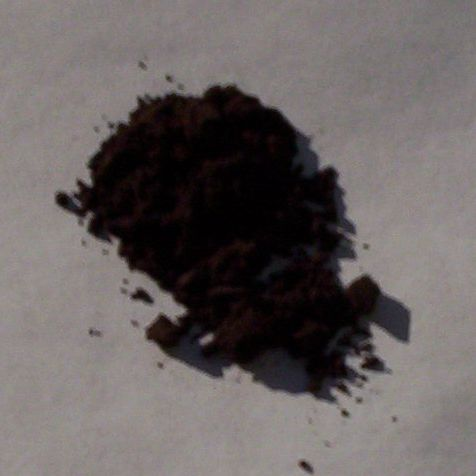
Terbium(III,IV) oxide (Tb_{4}O_{7})

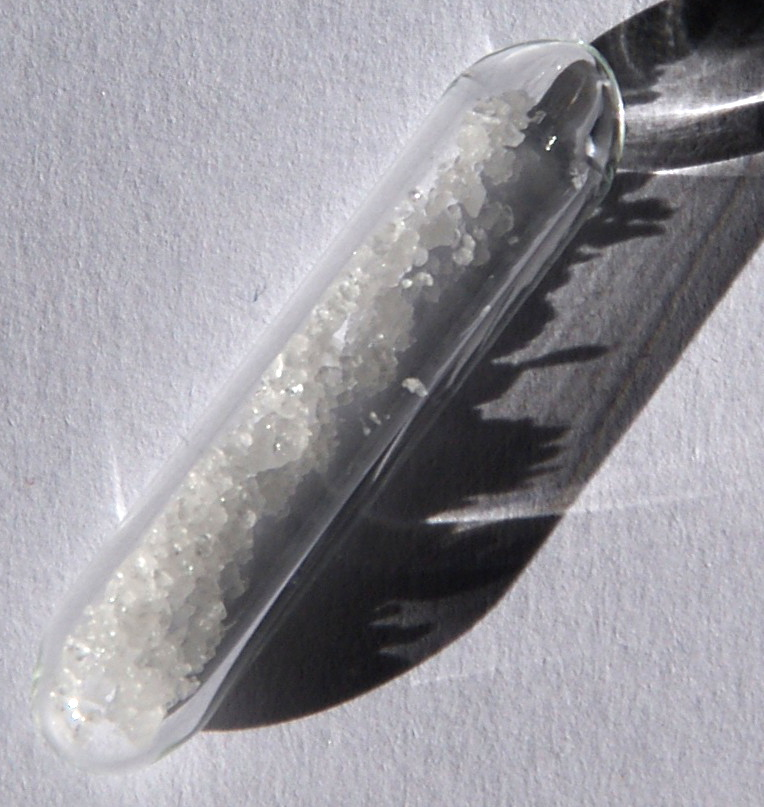
Terbium(III) sulfate (Tb_{2}(SO_{4})_{3})

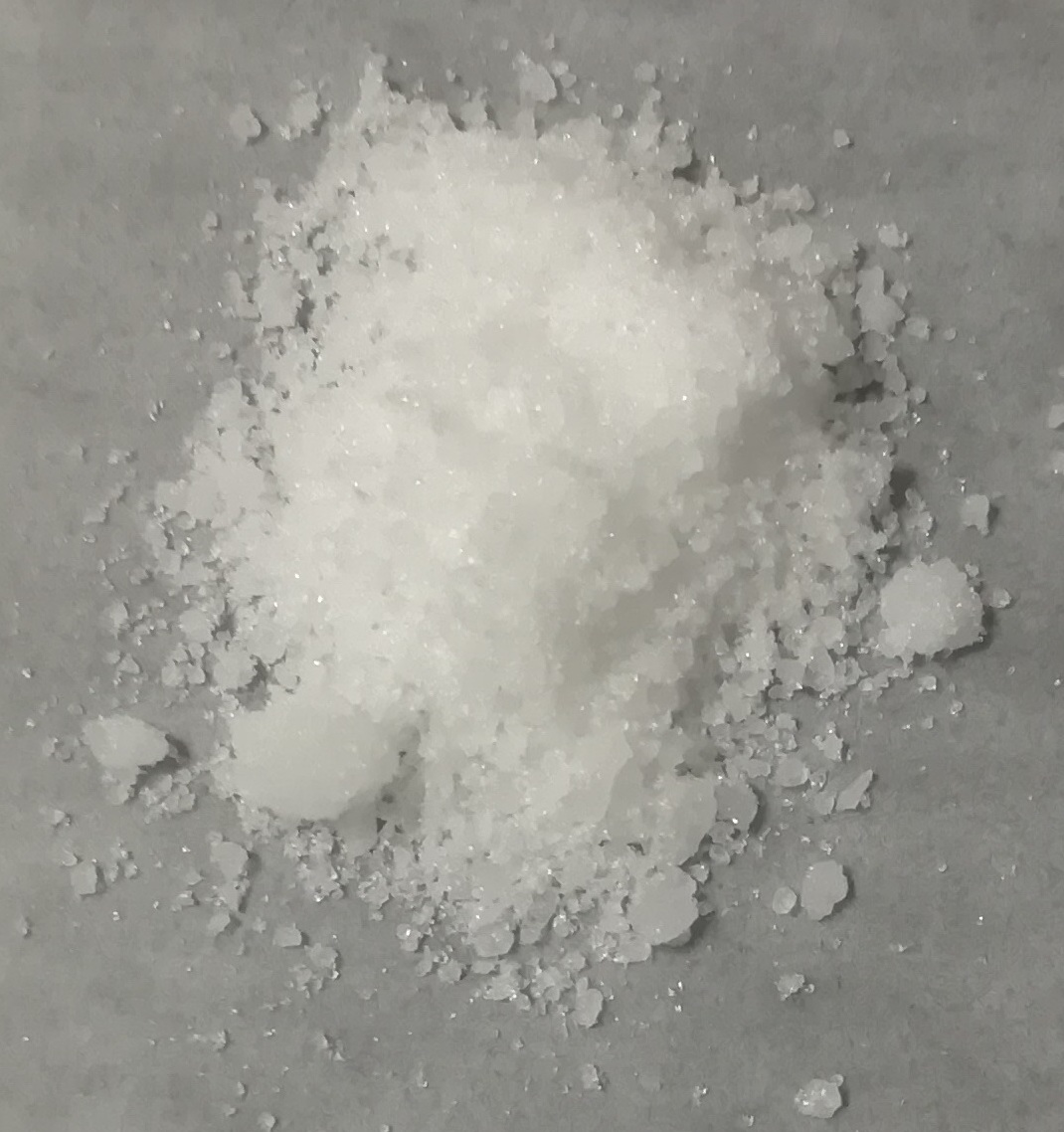
Terbium nitrate hexahydrate (Tb(NO_{3})_{3}·6H_{2}O)

== See also ==
- Europium compounds
- Berkelium compounds (the actinide analogue of terbium)
