= Terbium(III) fluoride =

Names
- Other names terbium trifluoride

Identifiers
CAS Number	13708-63-9
3D model (JSmol)	Interactive image
ChemSpider	75496
ECHA InfoCard	100.033.846
EC Number	237-247-0
PubChem CID	83673
UNII	YW5PJY3U68
CompTox Dashboard (EPA)	DTXSID8065589
- InChI: InChI=1S/3FH.Tb/h3*1H;/q;;;+3/p-3 Key: LKNRQYTYDPPUOX-UHFFFAOYSA-K
- SMILES: F[Tb](F)F

Properties
Chemical formula	TbF_{3}
Molar mass	215.92
Melting point	1172°C

Hazards
- Lethal dose or concentration (LD, LC)
LD_{50} (median dose)	10 g/kg（rabbit）

Related compounds
Other anions	terbium(III) chloride terbium(III) bromide terbium(III) iodide
Other cations	gadolinium(III) fluoride dysprosium(III) fluoride
- Except where otherwise noted, data are given for materials in their standard state (at 25 °C [77 °F], 100 kPa). Infobox references

Terbium(III) fluoride is an inorganic compound with chemical formula TbF_{3}. It is hard to dissolve in water. It can be produced by reacting terbium(III) carbonate and 40% hydrofluoric acid at 40°C.

== Uses ==
Terbium(III) fluoride is used for producing metallic terbium.

2 TbF_{3} + 3 Ca → 3 CaF_{2} + 2 Tb
