= Terbium arsenate =

Names
- Other names Terbium(III) arsenate

Identifiers
CAS Number	28548-41-6
3D model (JSmol)	Interactive image
PubChem CID	44135912
- InChI: InChI=1S/AsH3O4.Tb/c2-1(3,4)5;/h(H3,2,3,4,5);/q;+3/p-3 Key: ZEDPLXDRVDUOTO-UHFFFAOYSA-K
- SMILES: [O-][As](=O)([O-])[O-].[Tb+3]

Properties
Chemical formula	TbAsO_{4}
Molar mass	297.84 g/mol
Appearance	Colorless crystalline solid
Density	6.172 g/cm^{3} (calculated, 25 °C)
Solubility in water	Sparingly soluble in water

Structure
Crystal structure	Tetragonal, xenotime type
Space group	I4_{1}/amd, No. 141
Lattice constant	a = 0.71025 nm, c = 0.63536 nm
Formula units (Z)	4
- Except where otherwise noted, data are given for materials in their standard state (at 25 °C [77 °F], 100 kPa). Infobox references

Terbium arsenate is an inorganic compound of terbium and the arsenate ion, with the formula TbAsO_{4}. At room temperature it crystallizes in the tetragonal xenotime structure type. It is only sparingly soluble in water and undergoes structural and magnetic phase transitions at very low temperatures.

== Preparation ==
Terbium arsenate can be precipitated from aqueous solutions containing terbium(III) and arsenate ions. For example, terbium(III) chloride reacts with sodium arsenate:

TbCl_{3} + Na_{3}AsO_{4} → TbAsO_{4}↓ + 3 NaCl

This method has been reported as part of systematic preparations of rare-earth arsenates.

A sample used for standard powder-diffraction measurements was prepared from an aqueous solution of arsenic pentoxide and terbium trichloride, followed by drying at 110 °C.

Single crystals suitable for spectroscopic studies can be grown by high-temperature flux methods.

== Properties ==
=== Crystal structure ===
At room temperature, TbAsO_{4} crystallizes in the tetragonal crystal system, space group I4_{1}/amd (No. 141), with the xenotime or zircon structure type.

At 25 °C its lattice parameters are:

a = 7.1025 Å
c = 6.3536 Å

with four formula units per unit cell. The calculated density from these lattice parameters is 6.172 g/cm^{3}.

The structure contains isolated AsO^{3−}_{4} tetrahedra and eight-coordinate Tb^{3+} ions. TbAsO_{4} belongs to the series of heavy rare-earth arsenates from Sm through Lu that adopt the tetragonal xenotime-type structure.

Polarized Raman spectroscopy shows the characteristic internal vibrations of the AsO_{4} tetrahedra; across the rare-earth arsenate series these frequencies generally increase as the rare-earth ionic radius decreases.

=== Solubility ===
Terbium arsenate is very sparingly soluble in water. A concentration-based solubility-product value of

pK_{sp,c} = 23.07 ± 0.09

has been reported.

=== Low-temperature phase transition ===
TbAsO_{4} undergoes a cooperative Jahn–Teller structural transition at approximately 27.7 K.

Below this temperature, the tetragonal lattice distorts along the ⟨110⟩ directions to an orthorhombic structure. The low-temperature phase is generally described in space group Fddd, with approximate lattice parameters a = 10.12 Å, b = 9.95 Å and c = 6.31 Å.

The transition results from coupling between low-lying electronic states of Tb^{3+} and the crystal lattice and is analogous to the Jahn–Teller distortions observed in DyAsO_{4} and TmAsO_{4}.

=== Magnetic properties ===
A second phase transition occurs near 1.5 K and marks the onset of long-range magnetic order.

Early susceptibility and spectroscopic studies described the low-temperature state in terms of strongly anisotropic, induced-moment magnetism.

Later neutron-diffraction measurements showed that the magnetic ordering is more complicated than a simple collinear ferro- or antiferromagnet. At 0.4 K the magnetic reflections are consistent with an incommensurate structure having propagation vector approximately (0.041, 0.075, 0.018), with the terbium moments lying in the ab plane.

Depending on the magnetic model used to interpret the powder data, the ordered moment was estimated as approximately 7.1 μ_{B} for a flat spiral model or up to 9.9 μ_{B} for a sinusoidally modulated structure.
