= Terbium phosphate =

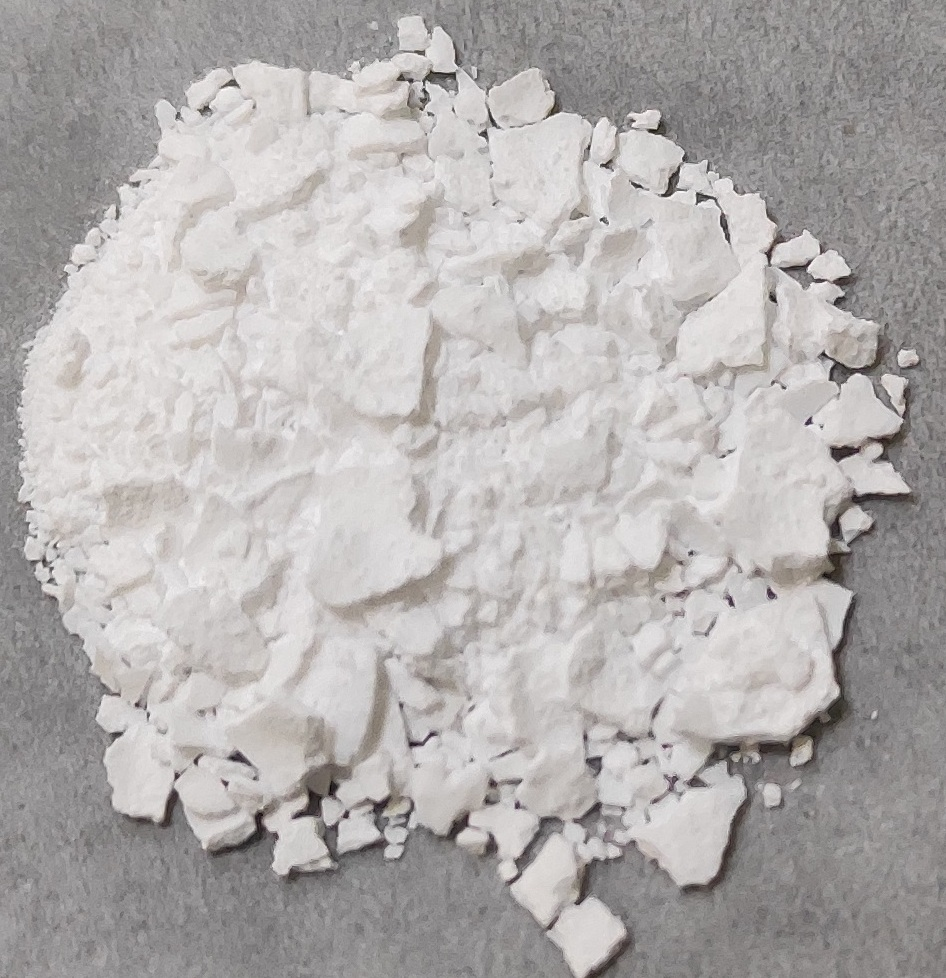

Names
- Other names Terbium orthophosphate

Identifiers
CAS Number	13863-48-4
3D model (JSmol)	Interactive image
ChemSpider	11226963
ECHA InfoCard	100.034.171
EC Number	237-604-0
PubChem CID	22218808
CompTox Dashboard (EPA)	DTXSID60930172
- InChI: InChI=1S/H3O4P.Tb/c1-5(2,3)4;/h(H3,1,2,3,4);/q;+3/p-3 Key: QQCIBICIISNSAY-UHFFFAOYSA-K
- SMILES: [O-]P(=O)([O-])[O-].[Tb+3]

Properties
Chemical formula	TbPO_{4}
Molar mass	253.89 g/mol
Appearance	Solid
- Except where otherwise noted, data are given for materials in their standard state (at 25 °C [77 °F], 100 kPa). Infobox references

Terbium phosphate is an inorganic compound of terbium and phosphate with the chemical formula TbPO_{4}. Hydrated and anhydrous forms are known. Depending on preparation conditions, anhydrous TbPO_{4} can occur in both xenotime- and monazite-type structures.

== Structure and properties ==
Terbium phosphate is unusual among the rare-earth orthophosphates because it lies close to the structural boundary between the monoclinic monazite and tetragonal xenotime structure types.

The xenotime form crystallizes in the tetragonal crystal system in space group I4_{1}/amd. Xenotime-type TbPO_{4} is metastable with respect to the denser monazite form under sufficiently high pressure.

Under pressure, xenotime-type TbPO_{4} transforms to the monoclinic monazite structure. Experiments place the onset of the transformation at about 9 GPa under near-hydrostatic conditions. The transformation is irreversible on decompression.

Hydrated TbPO_{4} commonly adopts a rhabdophane-type structure. TbPO_{4}·H_{2}O prepared hydrothermally forms nanorods and hierarchical spindle-like aggregates, with morphology strongly dependent on pH and reactant concentrations.

=== Luminescence ===
Terbium phosphate shows characteristic Tb^{3+} photoluminescence. Under ultraviolet excitation, TbPO_{4} exhibits emission from the ^{5}D_{4} excited state to the ^{7}F_{J} ground-state manifold, producing strong green to yellow-green emission.

An early study reported orange-yellow fluorescence under ultraviolet light near 366 nm, with a reversible change to the characteristic yellow-green terbium emission after heating in air to about 100 °C.

Nanostructured TbPO_{4}·H_{2} also shows strong photoluminescence, with hierarchical spindle-like particles giving greater emission intensity than comparable nano- and microscale particles.

=== Magnetic properties ===
TbPO_{4} orders antiferromagnetically at very low temperature. As of 2026, measurements place the transition near 2.3 K and report a sizeable low-temperature magnetocaloric effect, leading to interest in TbPO_{4} for cryogenic magnetic refrigeration.

== Preparation ==
Hydrated terbium phosphate can be prepared by precipitation from aqueous solutions containing Tb^{3+} and phosphate ions. For example, terbium(III) chloride reacts with sodium phosphate to give hydrated TbPO_{4}.

The precipitated hydrate can be converted to anhydrous TbPO_{4} by calcination at about 800 °C.

Hydrothermal synthesis has also been used to prepare TbPO_{4}·H_{2}O nanostructures with controlled morphologies.
