= Terbium phosphide =

Erbium compound

Names
- Other names Terbium monophosphide, phosphanylidyneterbium

Identifiers
CAS Number	12037-64-8
3D model (JSmol)	Interactive image
ChemSpider	74767
EC Number	234-861-0
PubChem CID	82855
- InChI: InChI=1S/P.Tb Key: YSYUNNARJACYRQ-UHFFFAOYSA-N
- SMILES: P#[Tb]

Properties
Chemical formula	PTb
Molar mass	189.899
Appearance	Black crystals
Density	6.82 g/cm^{3}

Structure
Crystal structure	Cubic

Related compounds
Other anions	Terbium nitride Terbium arsenide Terbium antimonide Terbium bismuthide
Other cations	Gadolinium phosphide Dysprosium phosphide
- Except where otherwise noted, data are given for materials in their standard state (at 25 °C [77 °F], 100 kPa). Infobox references

Terbium phosphide is an inorganic compound of terbium and phosphorus with the chemical formula TbP.

== Synthesis ==
TbP can be obtained by the reaction of terbium and red phosphorus at 800–1000 °C:

4 Tb + P_{4} → 4 TbP

The compound can also be obtained by the reaction of sodium phosphide and anhydrous terbium chloride at 700~800 °C.

== Physical properties ==
TbP undergoes a phase transition at 40 GPa from a NaCl-structure to a CsCl-structure. The compound can be sintered with zinc sulfide to make a green phosphor layer.

TbP forms crystals of a cubic system, space group Fm3m.

== Uses ==
The compound is a semiconductor used in high power, high frequency applications and in laser diodes and other photo diodes.
