= Terbium acetate =

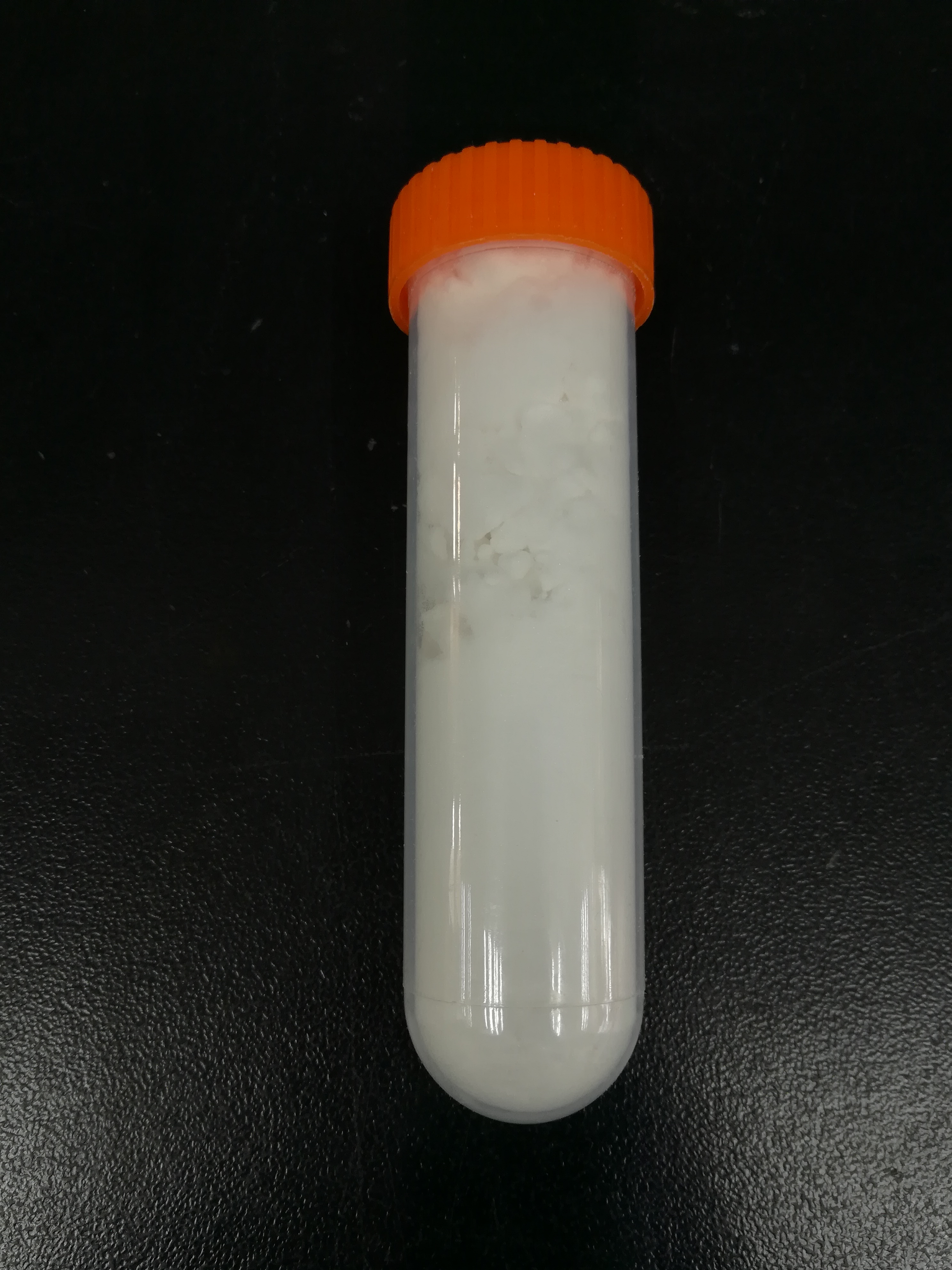

Names
- Other names Terbium acetate Terbium triacetate

Identifiers
CAS Number	25519-07-7
3D model (JSmol)	Interactive image
ChemSpider	147290
ECHA InfoCard	100.042.772
EC Number	247-065-3
PubChem CID	168383
CompTox Dashboard (EPA)	DTXSID40890801
- InChI: InChI=1S/3C2H4O2.Tb/c3*1-2(3)4;/h3*1H3,(H,3,4);/q;;;+3/p-3 Key: JQBILSNVGUAPMM-UHFFFAOYSA-K
- SMILES: CC(=O)[O-].CC(=O)[O-].CC(=O)[O-].[Tb+3]

Properties
Chemical formula	Tb(CH_{3}COO)_{3}
Appearance	White crystals

Related compounds
Other cations	Gadolinium acetate Dysprosium acetate
- Except where otherwise noted, data are given for materials in their standard state (at 25 °C [77 °F], 100 kPa). Infobox references

Terbium(III) acetate is the acetate salt of terbium, with a chemical formula of Tb(CH_{3}COO)_{3}.

== Physical properties ==
Terbium(III) acetate reacts with caesium carbonate to form a precipitation of terbium hydroxycarbonate, which reacts with excess caesium carbonate and dissolves again. The reaction was irradiated with ultraviolet light with a wavelength of 365 nm, which has the characteristic green light of terbium.

The tetrahydrate of terbium acetate can lose hydration at 60 °C, obtaining the anhydrate at 180 °C, which starts to decompose at 220 °C, forming terbium oxide at 650 °C.

== External reading ==
- Lossin, Adalbert; Meyer, Gerd. Anhydrous rare-earth acetates, M(CH_{3}COO)_{3} (M = samarium-lutetium, yttrium) with chain structures. Crystal structures of Lu(CH_{3}COO)3 and Ho(CH_{3}COO)_{3} (in German). Zeitschrift fuer Anorganische und Allgemeine Chemie, 1993. 619(9): 1609–1615. ISSN:0044-2313
