= Lutetium(III) sulfate =

Names
- Other names Lutetium sulfate

Identifiers
CAS Number	anhydrous: 14986-89-1; octahydrate: 13473-77-3
3D model (JSmol)	octahydrate: Interactive image
ChemSpider	anhydrous: 146304
ECHA InfoCard	100.035.507
PubChem CID	anhydrous: 167223; octahydrate: 56846288
CompTox Dashboard (EPA)	DTXSID30890754
- InChI: octahydrate: InChI=1S/2Lu.3H2O4S.8H2O/c;;3*1-5(2,3)4;;;;;;;;/h;;3*(H2,1,2,3,4);8*1H2/q2*+3;;;;;;;;;;;/p-6 Key: APHGKCKNWULWPE-UHFFFAOYSA-H
- SMILES: octahydrate: O.O.O.O.O.O.O.O.[O-]S(=O)(=O)[O-].[O-]S(=O)(=O)[O-].[O-]S(=O)(=O)[O-].[Lu+3].[Lu+3]

Properties
Chemical formula	Lu_{2}(SO_{4})_{3}
Molar mass	638.13 g/mol
Appearance	White crystalline solid
Solubility in water	Soluble in water

Hazards
- GHS labelling
Pictograms	(GHS07: Exclamation mark)
Signal word	Warning
Hazard statements	H315, H319, H335
Precautionary statements	P261, P305+P351+P338
- Except where otherwise noted, data are given for materials in their standard state (at 25 °C [77 °F], 100 kPa). Infobox references

Lutetium(III) sulfate is an inorganic compound of lutetium and sulfuric acid with the chemical formula Lu_{2}(SO_{4})_{3}. It commonly crystallizes from aqueous solution as the octahydrate, Lu_{2}(SO_{4})_{3}·8H_{2}O.

== Properties ==
Lutetium(III) sulfate is soluble in water. The octahydrate has a molar mass of 782.25 g/mol and forms colorless to white crystals.

Like the other heavy rare-earth sulfates, lutetium(III) sulfate exhibits retrograde solubility: its solubility decreases strongly as temperature increases. Between 25 and 95 °C, the octahydrate is the equilibrium solid phase in contact with saturated aqueous solutions.

Across the heavy rare-earth series from gadolinium to lutetium, sulfate solubility increases markedly with increasing atomic number; lutetium(III) sulfate is therefore substantially more soluble than the corresponding gadolinium or terbium sulfates at comparable temperatures.

At 20 °C, a solubility of approximately 42.3 g per 100 mL of water has been reported for the octahydrate.

A trihydrate, Lu_{2}(SO_{4})_{3}·3H_{2}O, is also known. Its crystal structure is considerably more complex than that of the common octahydrate, containing three crystallographically distinct Lu^{3+} sites with coordination numbers of six and eight.

== Preparation ==
Lutetium(III) sulfate can be prepared by dissolving lutetium(III) oxide in sulfuric acid:

Lu_{2}O_{3} + 3 H_{2}SO_{4} → Lu_{2}(SO_{4})_{3} + 3 H_{2}O

Crystallization from aqueous solution gives the octahydrate.

The octahydrate can also be crystallized by evaporation of aqueous solutions containing lutetium(III) ions and sulfate ions.

== Reactions ==
Lutetium(III) sulfate reacts with alkali hydroxides to precipitate lutetium(III) hydroxide:

Lu_{2}(SO_{4})_{3} + 6 NaOH → 2 Lu(OH)_{3}↓ + 3 Na_{2}SO_{4}

On strong heating, lutetium sulfate ultimately decomposes rather than boiling. Lutetium sulfate has also been used as a precursor for preparation of lutetium oxysulfate and lutetium oxide materials.
