= Terbium(III) iodide =

Names
- Other names terbium triiodide

Identifiers
CAS Number	13813-40-6
3D model (JSmol)	Interactive image
ChemSpider	75569
ECHA InfoCard	100.034.049
EC Number	237-469-8
PubChem CID	83747
CompTox Dashboard (EPA)	DTXSID0065644
- InChI: Key: OJXRJPFRTRETRN-UHFFFAOYSA-K; InChI=1S/3HI.Tb/h3*1H;/q;;;+3/p-3
- SMILES: I[Tb](I)I

Properties
Chemical formula	TbI_{3}
Molar mass	539.638 g/mol
Appearance	hygroscopic crystals
Density	5.2 g/cm^{3}, solid
Melting point	957 °C (1,755 °F; 1,230 K)

Structure
Crystal structure	hexagonal

Hazards
- GHS labelling
Pictograms	(GHS07: Exclamation mark) (GHS08: Health hazard)
Signal word	Warning
Hazard statements	H317, H361
Precautionary statements	P201, P202, P261, P264, P271, P272, P280, P281, P302+P352, P304+P340, P305+P351+P338, P308+P313, P312, P332+P313, P333+P313, P337+P313, P362, P363, P403+P233, P405, P501
- Except where otherwise noted, data are given for materials in their standard state (at 25 °C [77 °F], 100 kPa). verify (what is ?) Infobox references

Terbium(III) iodide (TbI_{3}) is an inorganic chemical compound.

== Preparation ==
Terbium(III) iodide can be produced by reacting terbium and iodine.

2 Tb + 3 I_{2} → 2 TbI_{3}

Terbium iodide hydrate can be crystallized from solution by reacting hydriodic acid with terbium, terbium(III) oxide, terbium hydroxide or terbium carbonate:

2 Tb + 6 HI → 2 TbI_{3} + 3 H_{2}↑
Tb_{2}O_{3} + 6 HI → 2 TbI_{3} + 3 H_{2}O
2 Tb(OH)_{3} + 6 HI → 2 TbI_{3} + 3 H_{2}O
Tb_{2}(CO_{3})_{3} + 6 HI → 2 TbI_{3} + 3 H_{2}O + 3 CO_{2}

An alternative method is reacting terbium and mercury(II) iodide at 500 °C.

== Structure ==
Terbium(III) iodide adopts the bismuth(III) iodide (BiI_{3}) crystal structure type, with octahedral coordination of each Tb^{3+} ion by 6 iodide ions.
