= Terbium oxide =

Terbium oxide may refer to any of the following:

- Terbium(III) oxide, Tb_{2}O_{3}
- Terbium(III,IV) oxide, Tb_{4}O_{7}
- Terbium(IV) oxide, TbO_{2}
