= Terbium silicide =

Names
- IUPAC name Terbium silicide
- Other names Terbium silicon Silicon terbium Terbium Disilicide; Terbium(IV) silicide

Identifiers
CAS Number	12039-80-4
3D model (JSmol)	Interactive image
ChemSpider	32816418
EC Number	234-903-8
PubChem CID	170843505
- InChI: InChI=1S/2Si.Tb Key: ANIPRLJNGJNJRK-UHFFFAOYSA-N
- SMILES: [Si].[Si].[Tb]

Properties
Chemical formula	TbSi_{2}
Molar mass	215.09 g/mol
Appearance	Gray powder
Solubility in water	Insoluble

Structure
Crystal structure	Orthorhombic or Hexagonal

Related compounds
Related compounds	Rare earth silicides
- Except where otherwise noted, data are given for materials in their standard state (at 25 °C [77 °F], 100 kPa). verify (what is ?) Infobox references

Terbium silicide is a chemical compound of the rare earth metal terbium with silicon having chemical formula TbSi_{2}. It is a gray solid first described in detail in the late 1950s.

The metallic resistivity and low Schottky barrier of TbSi_{2} (on n-type doped silicon) make it a potential candidate for applications such as infrared detectors, ohmic contacts, magnetoresistive devices, and thermoelectric devices.

It exhibits antiferromagnetism at 16K.
