= Terbium(III) hydroxide =

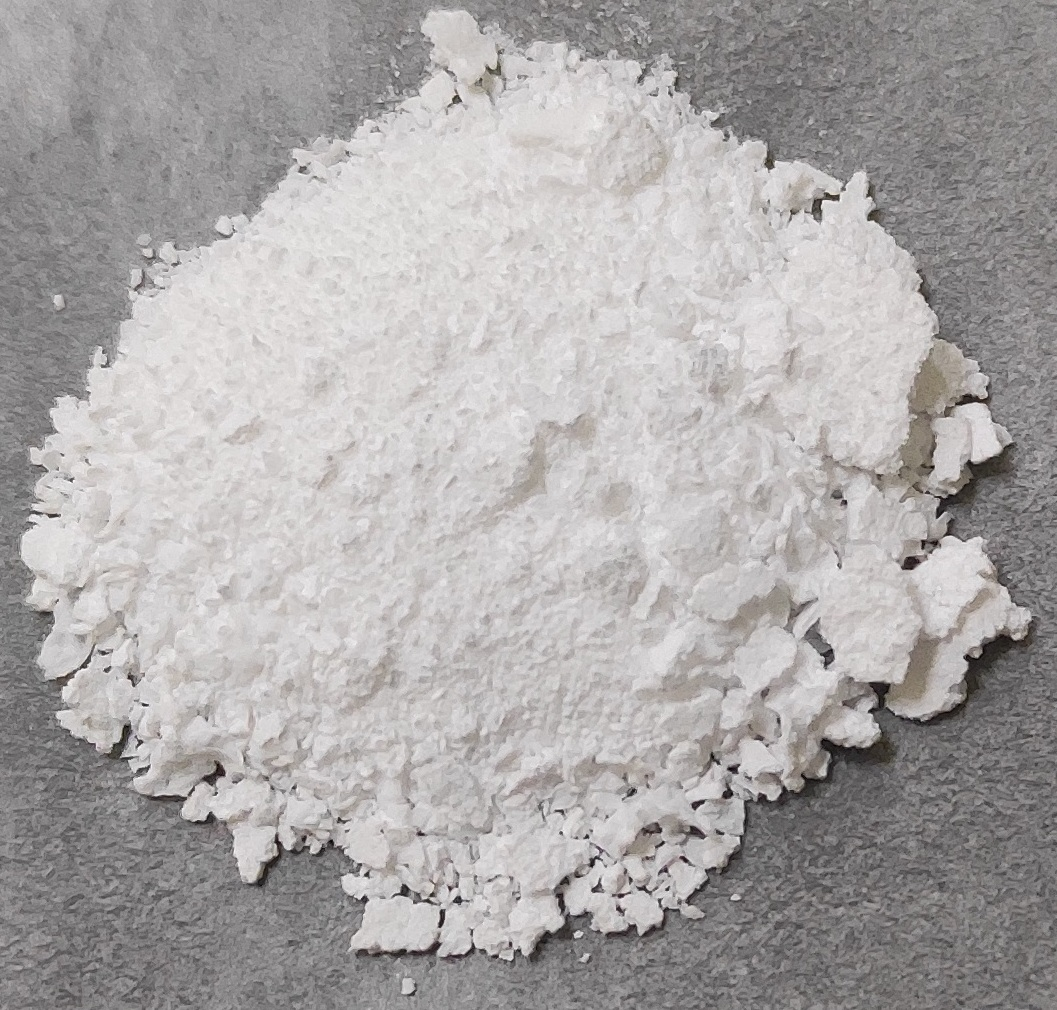

Identifiers
CAS Number	12054-65-8
3D model (JSmol)	Interactive image
ChemSpider	9565078
ECHA InfoCard	100.031.815
EC Number	235-010-6
PubChem CID	11390176
CompTox Dashboard (EPA)	DTXSID70923459
- InChI: InChI=1S/3H2O.Tb/h3*1H2;/q;;;+3/p-3 Key: HGBHINYCUZBWCK-UHFFFAOYSA-K
- SMILES: [Tb+3].[OH-].[OH-].[OH-]

Properties
Chemical formula	Tb(OH)_{3}
Molar mass	209.949
Appearance	white solid

Related compounds
Other anions	terbium oxide
Other cations	gadolinium(III) hydroxide dysprosium(III) hydroxide
- Except where otherwise noted, data are given for materials in their standard state (at 25 °C [77 °F], 100 kPa). Infobox references

Terbium(III) hydroxide is an inorganic compound with chemical formula Tb(OH)_{3}.

== Chemical properties ==
Terbium(III) hydroxide reacts with acids and produces terbium(III) salts:

Tb(OH)_{3} + 3 H^{+} → Tb^{3+} + 3 H_{2}O

Terbium(III) hydroxide decomposes to TbO(OH) at 340°C. Further decomposition at 500°C generates Tb_{4}O_{7} and O_{2}.
