= Dysprosium(III) acetate =

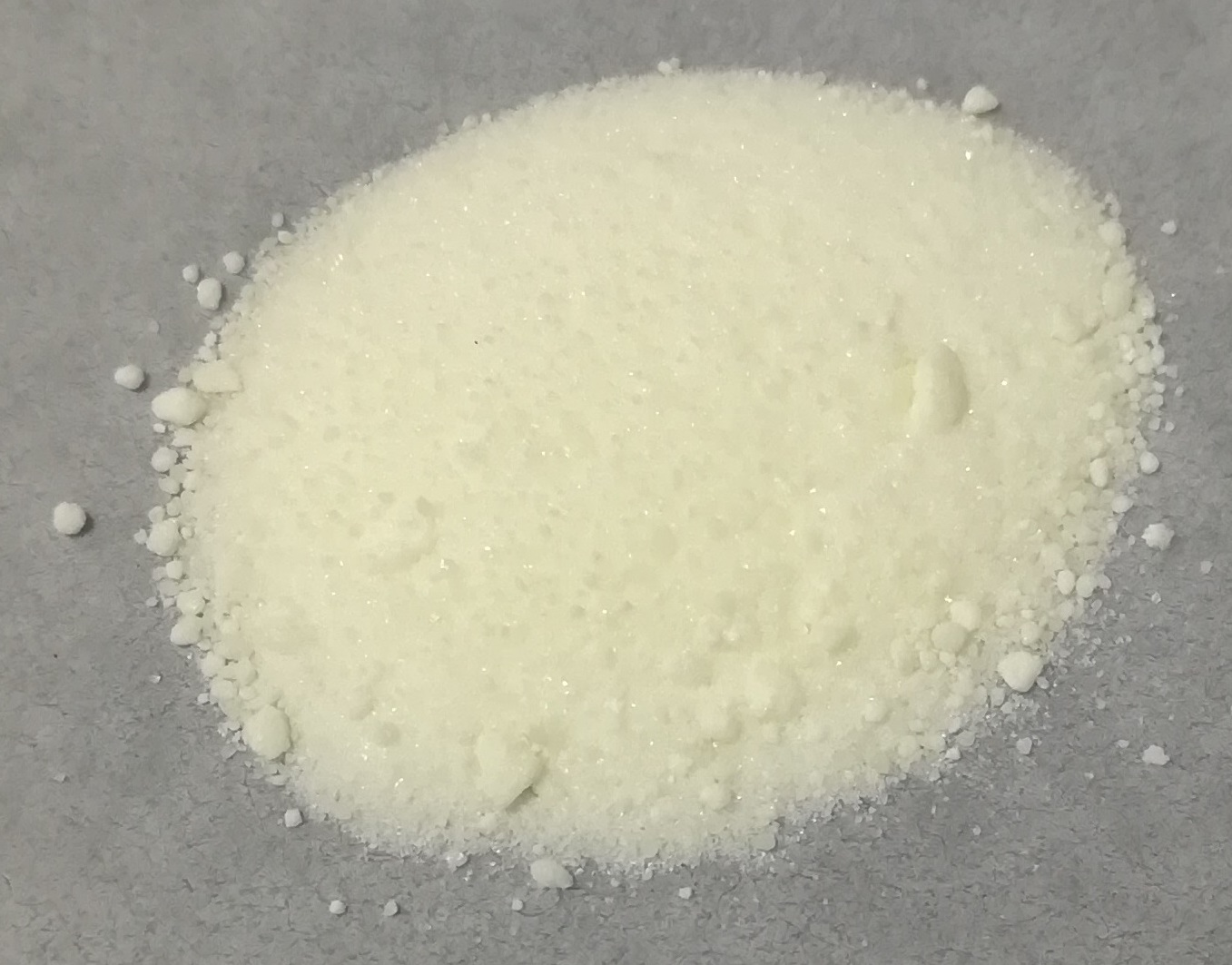

Names
- Other names Dysprosium triacetate

Identifiers
CAS Number	18779-07-2 anhydrous; 15280-55-4 tetrahydate
3D model (JSmol)	Interactive image
ChemSpider	146739
ECHA InfoCard	100.157.317
EC Number	242-565-8
PubChem CID	167746
CompTox Dashboard (EPA)	DTXSID40890780 DTXSID50934604, DTXSID40890780
- InChI: InChI=1S/3C2H4O2.Dy/c3*1-2(3)4;/h3*1H3,(H,3,4);/q;;;+3/p-3 Key: HKCSKROOVZMKSO-UHFFFAOYSA-K
- SMILES: CC(=O)[O-].CC(=O)[O-].CC(=O)[O-].[Dy+3]

Properties
Chemical formula	Dy(CH_{3}COO)_{3}
Molar mass	339.63 g/mol
Appearance	white powder
Solubility in water	soluble in water

Hazards
- GHS labelling
Pictograms	(GHS07: Exclamation mark)
Signal word	Warning
Hazard statements	H315, H319, H335
Precautionary statements	P261, P264, P264+P265, P271, P280, P302+P352, P304+P340, P305+P351+P338, P319, P321, P332+P317, P337+P317, P362+P364, P403+P233, P405, P501

Related compounds
Other cations	Terbium acetate Holmium acetate
Related compounds	Dysprosium oxide
- Except where otherwise noted, data are given for materials in their standard state (at 25 °C [77 °F], 100 kPa). Infobox references

Dysprosium acetate is an inorganic compound with the formula Dy(CH_{3}COO)_{3}. It forms hydrates including a tetrahydrate.

== Preparation ==
Dysprosium acetate can be obtained by treating dysprosium oxide with acetic acid:

Dy_{2}O_{3} + 6 CH_{3}COOH → 2 Dy(CH_{3}COO)_{3} + 3 H_{2}O

Its hydrate, when heated to 150 °C in vacuum, yields the anhydrous triacetate.

== Reactions ==
Dysprosium(III) acetate tetrahydrate catalyzes the cyclization of 2-{[2-(phenylsulfonyl)hydrazinylidene]methyl}benzoic acid (BSHOPA) to form 2-(phenylsulfonyl)phthalazin-1(2H)-one (PSP).

Dysprosium(III) acetate forms a variety of coordination polymers, e.g. with cymantrenecarboxylic acid.
