= Terbium(III) bromide =

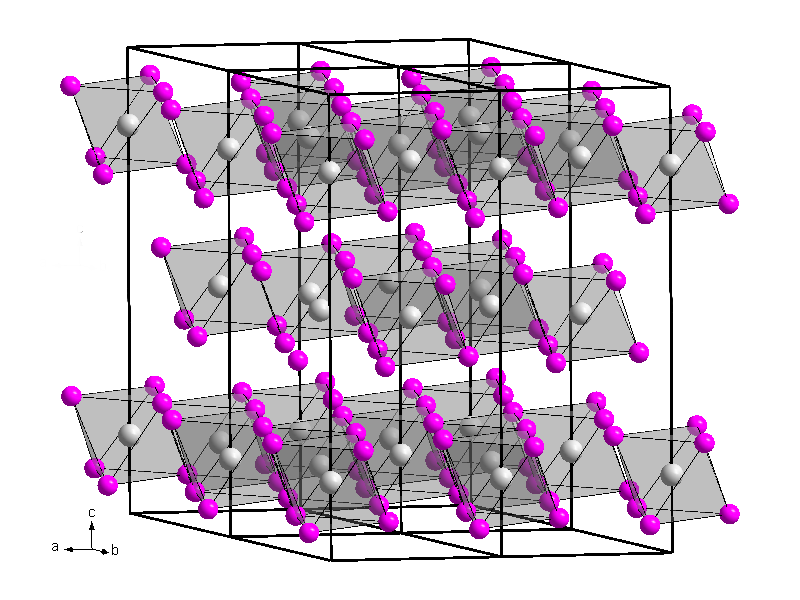
- Terbium(III) bromide

Names
- IUPAC name Terbium(III) bromide
- Other names Terbium tribromide

Identifiers
CAS Number	14456-47-4
3D model (JSmol)	Interactive image
ChemSpider	76181
ECHA InfoCard	100.034.932
EC Number	238-442-3
PubChem CID	84452
CompTox Dashboard (EPA)	DTXSID60932333
- InChI: InChI=1S/3BrH.Tb/h3*1H;/q;;;+3/p-3 Key: AZNZWHYYEIQIOC-UHFFFAOYSA-K
- SMILES: [Br-].[Br-].[Br-].[Tb+3]

Properties
Chemical formula	TbBr_{3}
Molar mass	398.637 g/mol
Appearance	white powder (hexahydrate)
Density	4.62 g/cm^{3}
Melting point	827 °C (1,521 °F; 1,100 K)
Boiling point	1,490 °C (2,710 °F; 1,760 K)
Solubility in water	soluble

Hazards
- GHS labelling
Pictograms	(GHS07: Exclamation mark)
Signal word	Warning
Hazard statements	H315, H319, H335
Precautionary statements	P261, P264, P271, P280, P302+P352, P304+P340, P305+P351+P338, P312, P321, P332+P313, P337+P313, P362, P403+P233, P405, P501
- Except where otherwise noted, data are given for materials in their standard state (at 25 °C [77 °F], 100 kPa). verify (what is ?) Infobox references

Terbium(III) bromide (TbBr_{3}) is a crystalline chemical compound.

== Production and properties ==
Terbiun(III) bromide can be produced by heating terbium metal or terbium(III) oxide with ammonium bromide.

Tb_{2}O_{3} + 6 NH_{4}Br → 2 TbBr_{3} + 6 NH_{3} + 3 H_{2}O

A solution of terbium(III) bromide can crystallize as a hexahydrate. When heating the hexahydrate, it will dehydrate and produce some terbium oxybromide (TbOBr).

Terbium(III) bromide is a white solid that is soluble in water. Its crystal structure is the same as bismuth iodide.
