= Terbium(IV) oxide =

Names
- IUPAC name Terbium(IV) oxide
- Other names Terbium dioxide

Identifiers
CAS Number	12036-15-6
3D model (JSmol)	Interactive image
PubChem CID	19784835
- InChI: InChI=1S/2O.Tb/q2*-2;+4 Key: PNHKKMHUOWDSEA-UHFFFAOYSA-N
- SMILES: [O-2].[O-2].[Tb+4]

Properties
Chemical formula	TbO_{2}
Molar mass	190.925
Appearance	dark red solid

Related compounds
Related compounds	Terbium(III) oxide Terbium(III,IV) oxide
- Except where otherwise noted, data are given for materials in their standard state (at 25 °C [77 °F], 100 kPa). Infobox references

Terbium(IV) oxide is an inorganic compound with a chemical formula TbO_{2}. It can be produced by oxidizing terbium(III) oxide by oxygen gas at 1000 atm and 300 °C.

== Decomposition ==
Terbium(IV) oxide starts to decompose at 340 °C, producing Tb_{5}O_{8} and oxygen:

5 TbO_{2} → Tb_{5}O_{8} + O_{2}

== See also ==
- Terbium(III) oxide
- Terbium(III,IV) oxide
