= Terbium(III,IV) oxide =

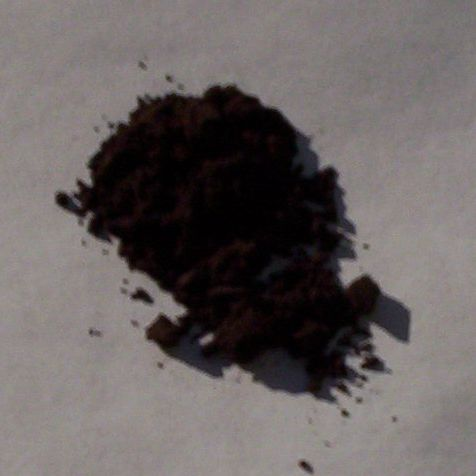
- Terbium(III,IV) oxide

Names
- IUPAC name Tetraterbium heptaoxide
- Other names Terbium(III,IV) oxide, Terbium peroxide

Identifiers
CAS Number	12037-01-3
3D model (JSmol)	Interactive image
ChemSpider	17339486
ECHA InfoCard	100.031.675
EC Number	234-856-3
PubChem CID	16211492
CompTox Dashboard (EPA)	DTXSID701027020 DTXSID40276469, DTXSID701027020
- InChI: InChI=1S/7O.4Tb Key: UWZVBPNIJCKCMC-UHFFFAOYSA-N
- SMILES: O=[Tb]O[Tb](=O)O[Tb](=O)O[Tb]=O

Properties
Chemical formula	Tb_{4}O_{7}
Molar mass	747.6972 g/mol
Appearance	Dark brown-black hygroscopic solid.
Density	7.3 g/cm^{3}
Melting point	Decomposes to Tb_{2}O_{3}
Solubility in water	Insoluble

Hazards
- Occupational safety and health (OHS/OSH)
Main hazards	Oxidising agent.

Related compounds
Other cations	Terbium(III) oxide Terbium(IV) oxide
Related compounds	Cerium(IV) oxide Praseodymium(III,IV) oxide
- Except where otherwise noted, data are given for materials in their standard state (at 25 °C [77 °F], 100 kPa). verify (what is ?) Infobox references

Terbium(III,IV) oxide, occasionally called tetraterbium heptaoxide, has the formula Tb_{4}O_{7}, though some texts refer to it as TbO_{1.75}. There is some debate as to whether it is a discrete compound, or simply one phase in an interstitial oxide system. Tb_{4}O_{7} is one of the main commercial terbium compounds, and the only such product containing at least some Tb(IV) (terbium in the +4 oxidation state), along with the more stable Tb(III). It is produced by heating the metal oxalate, and it is used in the preparation of other terbium compounds. It is also used in electronics and data storage, green energy technologies, medical imaging and diagnosis, and chemical processes. Terbium forms three other major oxides: Tb_{2}O_{3}, TbO_{2}, and Tb_{6}O_{11}.

== Synthesis ==
Tb_{4}O_{7} is most often produced by ignition of the oxalate or the sulfate in air. The oxalate (at 1000 °C) is generally preferred, since the sulfate requires a higher temperature, and it produces an almost black product contaminated with Tb_{6}O_{11} or other oxygen-rich oxides.

== Chemical properties ==
Terbium(III,IV) oxide loses O_{2} when heated at high temperatures; at more moderate temperatures (ca. 350 °C) it reversibly loses oxygen, as shown by exchange with^{18}O_{2}. This property, also seen in Pr_{6}O_{11} and V_{2}O_{5}, allows it to work like V_{2}O_{5} as a redox catalyst in reactions involving oxygen. It was found as early as 1916 that hot Tb_{4}O_{7} catalyses the reaction of coal gas (CO + H_{2}) with air, leading to incandescence and often ignition.

Tb_{4}O_{7} reacts with atomic oxygen to produce TbO_{2}, but more convenient preparations are available.

Tb_{4}O_{7} (s) + 6 HCl (aq) → 2 TbO_{2} (s) + 2 TbCl_{3} (aq) + 3 H_{2}O (l)

Tb_{4}O_{7} reacts with other hot concentrated acids to produce terbium(III) salts. For example, reaction with sulfuric acid gives terbium(III) sulfate. Terbium oxide reacts slowly with hydrochloric acid to form terbium(III) chloride solution, and elemental chlorine. At ambient temperature, complete dissolution might require a month; in a hot water bath, about a week.

Anhydrous terbium(III) chloride can be produced by the ammonium chloride route. In the first step, terbium oxide is heated with ammonium chloride to produce the ammonium salt of the pentachloride:

Tb_{4}O_{7} + 22 NH_{4}Cl → 4 (NH_{4})_{2}TbCl_{5} + 7 H_{2}O + 14 NH_{3}

In the second step, the ammonium chloride salt is converted to the trichlorides by heating in a vacuum at 350-400 °C:

(NH_{4})_{2}TbCl_{5} → TbCl_{3} + 2 HCl + 2 NH_{3}
