= Terbium nitride =

Names
- IUPAC name Azanylidyneterbium
- Other names Terbium mononitride

Identifiers
CAS Number	12033-64-6
3D model (JSmol)	Interactive image
EC Number	234-790-5
PubChem CID	82833
CompTox Dashboard (EPA)	DTXSID1065184
- InChI: InChI=1S/N.Tb Key: DOHQPUDBULHKAI-UHFFFAOYSA-N
- SMILES: [Tb]#N

Properties
Chemical formula	NTb
Molar mass	172.932 g·mol^{−1}
Appearance	black powder
Density	9.49 g/cm^{3}
Melting point	2,630 °C (4,770 °F; 2,900 K)

Structure
Crystal structure	cubic
- Except where otherwise noted, data are given for materials in their standard state (at 25 °C [77 °F], 100 kPa). Infobox references

Terbium nitride is a binary inorganic compound of terbium and nitrogen with the chemical formula TbN.

== Physical properties ==
Terbium nitride crystalyzes with cubic crystal system of the space group of F3m3.

== Uses ==
Terbium nitride is used for high-end electronics, ceramics, luminescent materials, special metallurgy, petrochemical, artificial crystal, magnetic materials.
