= Terbium =

Terbium, _{65}Tb
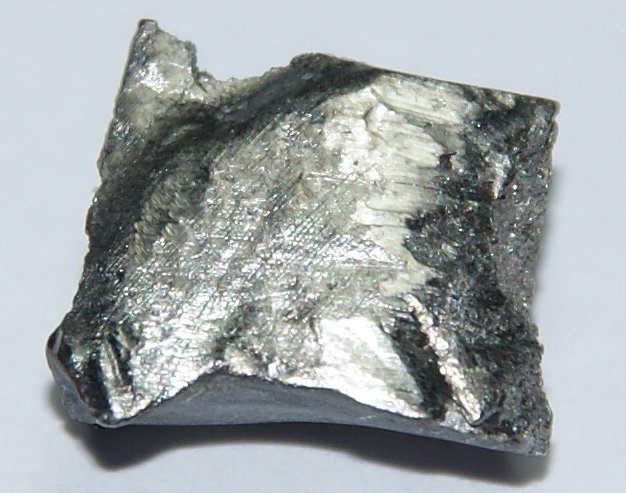

Terbium
- Pronunciation: /ˈtɜːrbiəm/ (TUR-bee-əm)
- Appearance: silvery white

Standard atomic weight A_{r}°(Tb)
- 158.925354±0.000007; 158.93±0.01 (abridged)

Terbium in the periodic table
Hydrogen																															Helium
Lithium	Beryllium																									Boron	Carbon	Nitrogen	Oxygen	Fluorine	Neon
Sodium	Magnesium																									Aluminium	Silicon	Phosphorus	Sulfur	Chlorine	Argon
Potassium	Calcium															Scandium	Titanium	Vanadium	Chromium	Manganese	Iron	Cobalt	Nickel	Copper	Zinc	Gallium	Germanium	Arsenic	Selenium	Bromine	Krypton
Rubidium	Strontium															Yttrium	Zirconium	Niobium	Molybdenum	Technetium	Ruthenium	Rhodium	Palladium	Silver	Cadmium	Indium	Tin	Antimony	Tellurium	Iodine	Xenon
Caesium	Barium	Lanthanum	Cerium	Praseodymium	Neodymium	Promethium	Samarium	Europium	Gadolinium	Terbium	Dysprosium	Holmium	Erbium	Thulium	Ytterbium	Lutetium	Hafnium	Tantalum	Tungsten	Rhenium	Osmium	Iridium	Platinum	Gold	Mercury (element)	Thallium	Lead	Bismuth	Polonium	Astatine	Radon
Francium	Radium	Actinium	Thorium	Protactinium	Uranium	Neptunium	Plutonium	Americium	Curium	Berkelium	Californium	Einsteinium	Fermium	Mendelevium	Nobelium	Lawrencium	Rutherfordium	Dubnium	Seaborgium	Bohrium	Hassium	Meitnerium	Darmstadtium	Roentgenium	Copernicium	Nihonium	Flerovium	Moscovium	Livermorium	Tennessine	Oganesson
–
↑
Tb
↓
Bk
gadolinium ← terbium → dysprosium
- Atomic number (Z): 65
- Group: f-block groups (no number)
- Period: period 6
- Block: f-block
- Electron configuration: [Xe] 4f^{9} 6s^{2}
- Electrons per shell: 2, 8, 18, 27, 8, 2

Physical properties
- Phase at STP: solid
- Melting point: 1629 K (1356 °C, 2473 °F)
- Boiling point: 3396 K (3123 °C, 5653 °F)
- Density (at 20° C): 8.229 g/cm^{3}
- when liquid (at m.p.): 7.65 g/cm^{3}
- Heat of fusion: 10.15 kJ/mol
- Heat of vaporization: 391 kJ/mol
- Molar heat capacity: 28.91 J/(mol·K)
- Specific heat capacity: 181.904 J/(kg·K)
Vapor pressure
P (Pa)	1	10	100	1 k	10 k	100 k
at T (K)	1789	1979	(2201)	(2505)	(2913)	(3491)

Atomic properties
- Oxidation states: common: +3; 0, +1, +2, +4
- Electronegativity: Pauling scale: 1.2 (?)
- Ionization energies: 1st: 565.8 kJ/mol; 2nd: 1110 kJ/mol; 3rd: 2114 kJ/mol
- Atomic radius: empirical: 177 pm
- Covalent radius: 194±5 pm
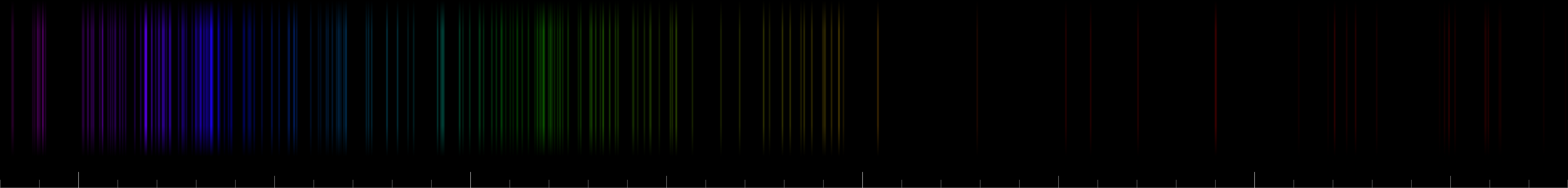
- Spectral lines of terbium

Other properties
- Natural occurrence: primordial
- Crystal structure: hexagonal close-packed (hcp) (hP2)
- Lattice constants: a = 360.56 pm c = 569.66 pm (at 20 °C)
- Thermal expansion: at r.t. poly: 10.3 µm/(m⋅K)
- Thermal conductivity: 11.1 W/(m⋅K)
- Electrical resistivity: α, poly: 1.150 µΩ⋅m (at r.t.)
- Magnetic ordering: paramagnetic at 300 K
- Molar magnetic susceptibility: +146000×10^{−6} cm^{3}/mol (273 K)
- Young's modulus: 55.7 GPa
- Shear modulus: 22.1 GPa
- Bulk modulus: 38.7 GPa
- Speed of sound thin rod: 2620 m/s (at 20 °C)
- Poisson ratio: 0.261
- Vickers hardness: 450–865 MPa
- Brinell hardness: 675–1200 MPa
- CAS Number: 7440-27-9

History
- Naming: after Ytterby (Sweden), where it was mined
- Discovery and first isolation: Carl Gustaf Mosander (1843)

Isotopes of terbium
Main isotopes			Decay	
Isotope	abundance	half-life (t_{1/2})	mode	product
^{157}Tb	synth	71 y	ε	^{157}Gd
^{158}Tb	synth	180 y	ε	^{158}Gd
^{158}Tb	synth	180 y	β^{−}	^{158}Dy
^{159}Tb	100%	stable		
^{160}Tb	synth	72.3 d	β^{−}	^{160}Dy
^{161}Tb	synth	6.948 d	β^{−}	^{161}Dy

Terbium is a chemical element; it has symbol Tb and atomic number 65. It is a silvery-white, rare earth metal that is malleable and ductile. The ninth member of the lanthanide series, terbium is a fairly electropositive metal that reacts with water, evolving hydrogen gas. Terbium is never found in nature as a free element, but it is contained in many minerals, including cerite, gadolinite, monazite, xenotime and euxenite.

Swedish chemist Carl Gustaf Mosander discovered terbium as a chemical element in 1843. He detected it as an impurity in yttrium oxide (Y_{2}O_{3}). Yttrium and terbium, as well as erbium and ytterbium, are named after the village of Ytterby in Sweden. Terbium was not isolated in pure form until the advent of ion exchange techniques.

Terbium is used to dope calcium fluoride, calcium tungstate and strontium molybdate in solid-state devices, and as a crystal stabilizer of fuel cells that operate at elevated temperatures. As a component of Terfenol-D (an alloy that expands and contracts when exposed to magnetic fields more than any other alloy), terbium is of use in actuators, in naval sonar systems and in sensors. Terbium is considered non-hazardous, though its biological role and toxicity have not been researched in depth.

Most of the world's terbium supply is used in green phosphors. Terbium oxide is used in fluorescent lamps and television and monitor cathode-ray tubes (CRTs). Terbium green phosphors are combined with divalent europium blue phosphors and trivalent europium red phosphors to provide trichromatic lighting technology, a high-efficiency white light used in indoor lighting.

== Characteristics ==
=== Physical properties ===
Terbium is a silvery-white rare earth metal that is malleable, ductile and soft enough to be cut with a knife. It is relatively stable in air compared to the more reactive lanthanides in the first half of the lanthanide series. Terbium exists in two crystal allotropes with a transformation temperature of 1289 °C between them. The 65 electrons of a terbium atom are arranged in the electron configuration [Xe]4f^{9}6s^{2}. The eleven 4f and 6s electrons are valence. Only three electrons can be removed before the nuclear charge becomes too great to allow further ionization, but in the case of terbium, the stability of the half-filled [Xe]4f^{7} configuration allows further ionization of a fourth electron in the presence of very strong oxidizing agents such as fluorine gas.

The terbium(III) cation (Tb^{3+}) is brilliantly fluorescent, in a bright lemon-yellow color that is the result of a strong green emission line in combination with other lines in the orange and red. The yttrofluorite variety of the mineral fluorite owes its creamy-yellow fluorescence in part to terbium. Terbium easily oxidizes, and is therefore used in its elemental form specifically for research. Single terbium atoms have been isolated by implanting them into fullerene molecules. Trivalent europium (Eu^{3+}) and Tb^{3+} ions are among the lanthanide ions that have garnered the most attention because of their strong luminosity and great color purity.

Terbium has a simple ferromagnetic ordering at temperatures below 219 K. Above 219 K, it turns into a helical antiferromagnetic state in which all of the atomic moments in a particular basal plane layer are parallel and oriented at a fixed angle to the moments of adjacent layers. This antiferromagnetism transforms into a disordered paramagnetic state at 230 K.

=== Chemical properties ===
Terbium metal is an electropositive element and oxidizes in the presence of most acids (such as sulfuric acid), all of the halogens, and water.

2 Tb(s) + 3 H_{2}SO_{4} → 2 Tb^{3+} + 3 SO_{4}^{2−} + 3 H_{2}(g)
2 Tb + 3 X_{2} → 2 TbX_{3} (X = F, Cl, Br, I)
2 Tb(s) + 6 H_{2}O → 2 Tb(OH)_{3} + 3 H_{2}(g)

Terbium oxidizes readily in air to form a mixed terbium(III,IV) oxide:

8 Tb + 7 O_{2} → 2 Tb_{4}O_{7}

The most common oxidation state of terbium is +3 (trivalent), such as in TbCl_{3}. In the solid state, tetravalent terbium is also known, in compounds such as terbium oxide (TbO_{2}) and terbium tetrafluoride. In solution, terbium typically forms trivalent species, but can be oxidized to the tetravalent state with ozone in highly basic aqueous conditions.

The coordination and organometallic chemistry of terbium is similar to other lanthanides. In aqueous conditions, terbium can be coordinated by nine water molecules, which are arranged in a tricapped trigonal prismatic molecular geometry. Complexes of terbium with lower coordination number are also known, typically with bulky ligands like bis(trimethylsilyl)amide, which forms the three-coordinate tris[N,N-bis(trimethylsilyl)amide]terbium(III) (Tb[N(SiMe_{3})_{2}]_{3}) complex.

Most coordination and organometallic complexes contain terbium in the trivalent oxidation state. Divalent Tb^{2+} complexes are also known, usually with bulky cyclopentadienyl-type ligands. A few coordination compounds containing terbium in its tetravalent state are also known.

==== Oxidation states ====
Like most rare-earth elements and lanthanides, terbium is usually found in the +3 oxidation state. Like cerium and praseodymium, terbium can also form a +4 oxidation state, although it is unstable in water. It is possible for terbium to be found in the 0, +1, and +2 oxidation states.

=== Compounds ===
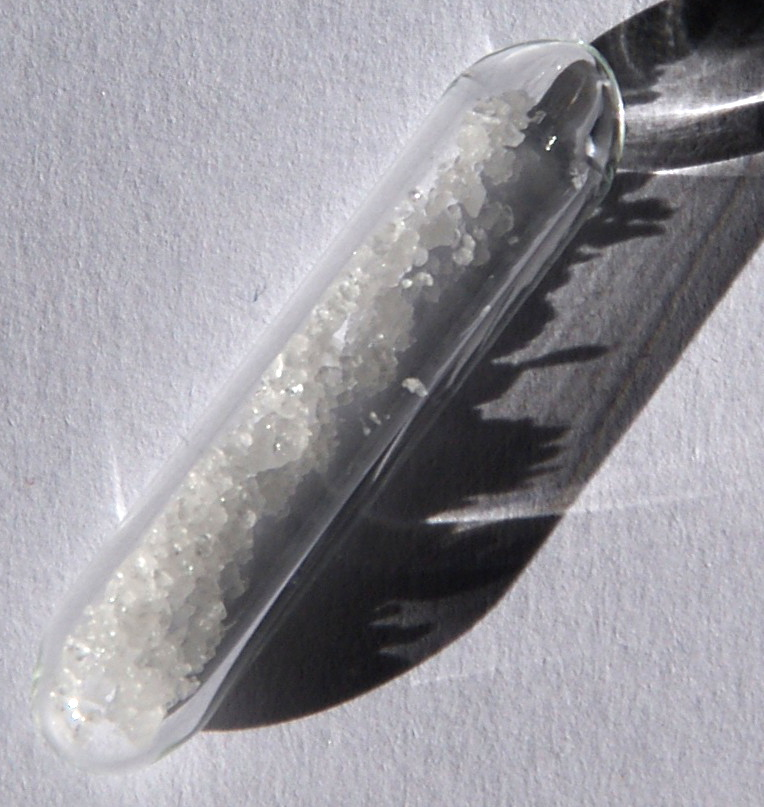

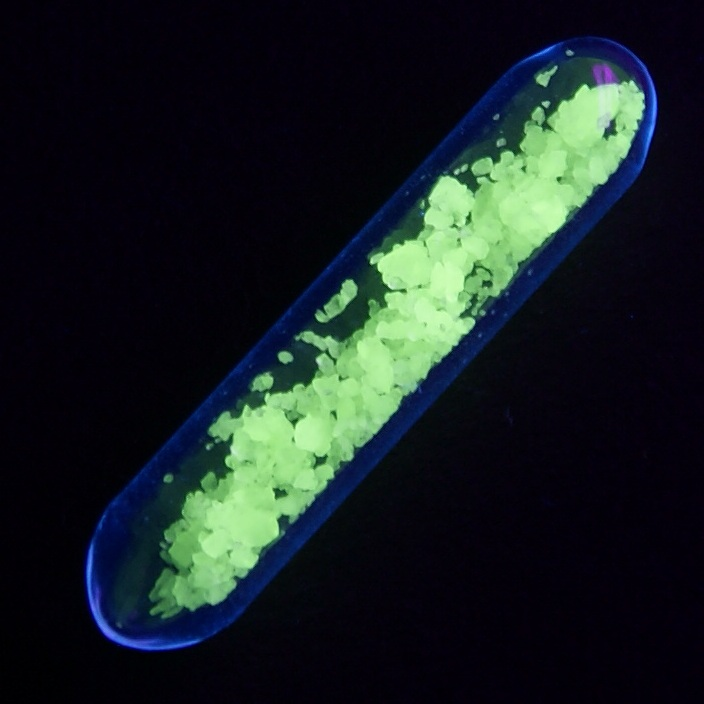
Terbium sulfate, Tb_{2}(SO_{4})_{3} (top), fluoresces green under ultraviolet light (bottom)

Terbium combines with nitrogen, carbon, sulfur, phosphorus, boron, selenium, silicon and arsenic at elevated temperatures, forming various binary compounds such as TbH_{2}, TbH_{3}, TbB_{2}, TbSi_{2}, TbN, TbP, TbS, Tb_{2}S_{3}, TbSe, and TbTe. In these compounds, terbium mainly exhibits the oxidation state +3, with the +2 state appearing rarely. Terbium(II) halides are obtained by annealing terbium(III) halides in presence of metallic terbium in tantalum containers. Terbium also forms the sesquichloride Tb_{2}Cl_{3}, which can be further reduced to terbium(I) chloride (TbCl) by annealing at 800 °C; this compound forms platelets with layered graphite-like structure.

Terbium(IV) fluoride (TbF_{4}) is the only halide that tetravalent terbium can form. It has strong oxidizing properties and is a strong fluorinating agent, emitting relatively pure atomic fluorine when heated, rather than the mixture of fluoride vapors emitted from cobalt(III) fluoride or cerium(IV) fluoride. It can be obtained by reacting terbium(III) chloride or terbium(III) fluoride with fluorine gas at 320 °C:

2 TbF_{3} + F_{2} → 2 TbF_{4}

When TbF_{4} and caesium fluoride (CsF) is mixed in a stoichiometric ratio in a fluorine gas atmosphere, caesium pentafluoroterbate (CsTbF_{5}) is obtained. It is an orthorhombic crystal with space group Cmca and a layered structure composed of TbF_{8}^{4−} and 11-coordinated Cs^{+}. The compound barium hexafluoroterbate (BaTbF_{6}), an orthorhombic crystal with space group Cmma, can be prepared in a similar method. The terbium fluoride ion TbF_{8}^{4−} also exists in the structure of potassium terbium fluoride crystals.

Terbium(III) oxide or terbia is the main oxide of terbium, and appears as a dark brown water-insoluble solid. It is slightly hygroscopic and is the main terbium compound found in rare earth-containing minerals and clays.

Other compounds include:

- Chlorides: TbCl_{3}
- Bromides: TbBr_{3}
- Iodides: TbI_{3}
- Fluorides: TbF_{3}, TbF_{4}

=== Isotopes ===
Naturally occurring terbium is composed of its only stable isotope, terbium-159; the element is thus mononuclidic and monoisotopic. Thirty-nine radioisotopes have been characterized from ^{135}Tb to ^{174}Tb. The most stable synthetic radioisotopes of terbium are ^{158}Tb, with a half-life of 180 years, and ^{157}Tb, with a half-life of 71 years. All of the remaining radioactive isotopes have half-lives that are less than three months, and the majority of these have half-lives that are less than half a minute. The primary decay mode before the most abundant stable isotope, ^{159}Tb, is electron capture, which results in production of gadolinium isotopes, and the primary mode after is beta minus decay, resulting in dysprosium isotopes. It is also the heaviest element where every stable nuclide has no confirmed energetically allowed decay mode, though the heaviest element with any such isotopes is dysprosium.

The element also has 31 nuclear isomers, with masses of 141–154, 156, 158, 162, and 164–168 (not every mass number corresponds to only one isomer). The most stable of them are terbium-156m2, with a half-life of 24.4 hours, and terbium-154m2, with a half-life of 22.7 hours; this is more stable than ground states of terbium isotopes, except outside the mass range 155–161.

Terbium-149, with its half-life of 4.1 hours, is a promising candidate in targeted alpha therapy and positron emission tomography.

== History ==
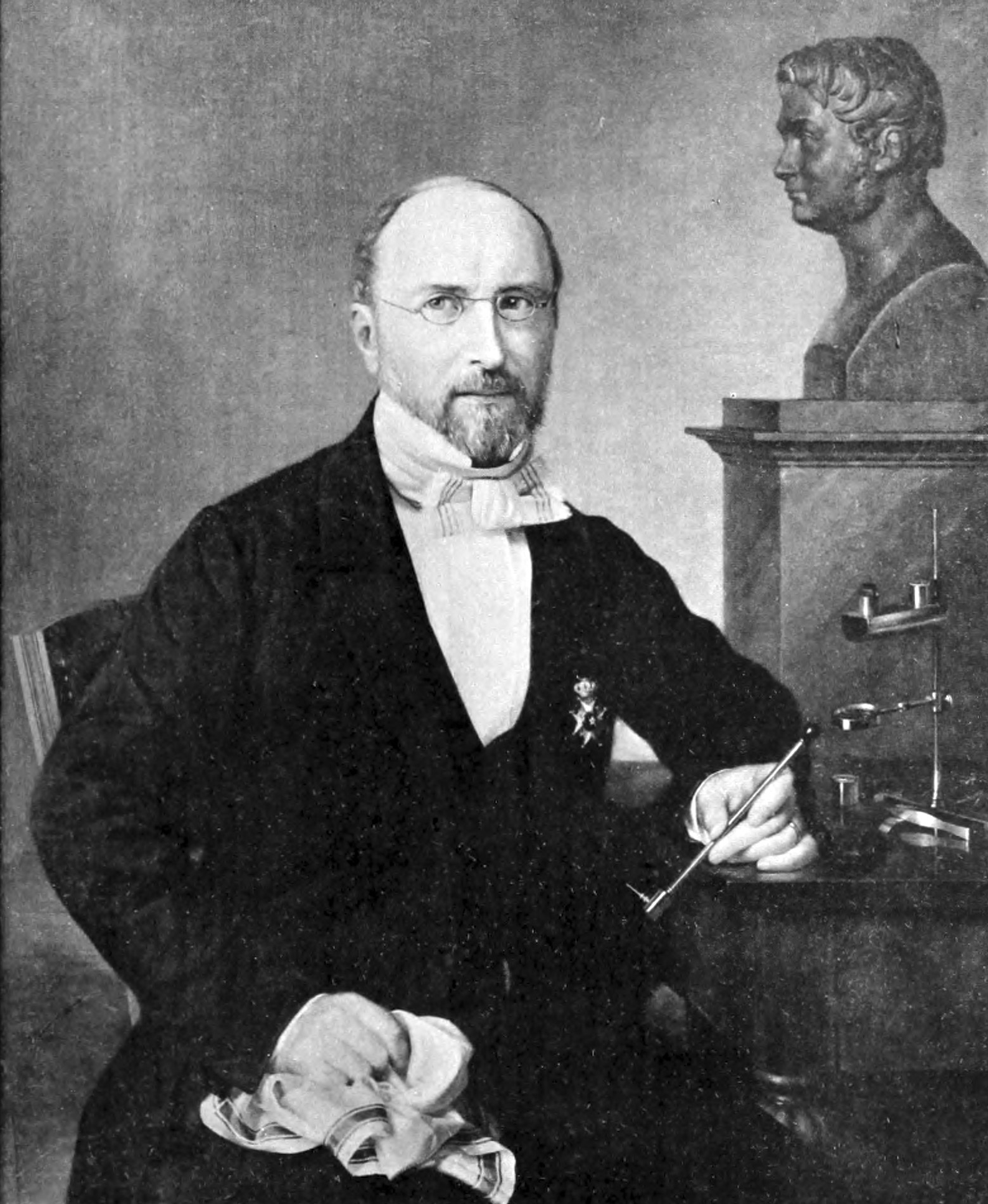
Carl Gustaf Mosander, the scientist who discovered terbium, lanthanum and erbium

Swedish chemist Carl Gustaf Mosander discovered terbium in 1843. He detected it as an impurity in yttrium oxide, Y_{2}O_{3}, then known as yttria. Yttrium, erbium, and terbium are all named after the village of Ytterby in Sweden. Terbium was not isolated in pure form until the advent of ion exchange techniques.

Mosander first separated yttria into three fractions, all named for the ore: yttria, erbia, and terbia. "Terbia" was originally the fraction that contained the pink color, due to the element now known as erbium. "Erbia", the oxide containing what is now known as terbium, originally was the fraction that was yellow or dark orange in solution. The insoluble oxide of this element was noted to be tinged brown, and soluble oxides after combustion were noted to be colorless. Until the advent of spectral analysis, arguments went back and forth as to whether erbia even existed. Spectral analysis by Marc Delafontaine allowed the separate elements and their oxides to be identified, but in his publications, the names of erbium and terbium were switched, following a brief period where terbium was renamed "mosandrum", after Mosander. The names have remained switched ever since.

The early years of preparing terbium (as terbium oxide) were difficult. Metal oxides from gadolinite and samarskite were dissolved in nitric acid, and the solution was further separated using oxalic acid and potassium sulfate. There was great difficulty in separating erbia from terbia; in 1881, it was noted that there was no satisfactory method to separate the two. By 1914, different solvents had been used to separate terbium from its host minerals, but the process of separating terbium from its neighbor elements - gadolinium and dysprosium - was described as "tedious" but possible. Modern terbium extraction methods are based on the liquid–liquid extraction process developed by Werner Fischer et al., in 1937.

== Occurrence ==
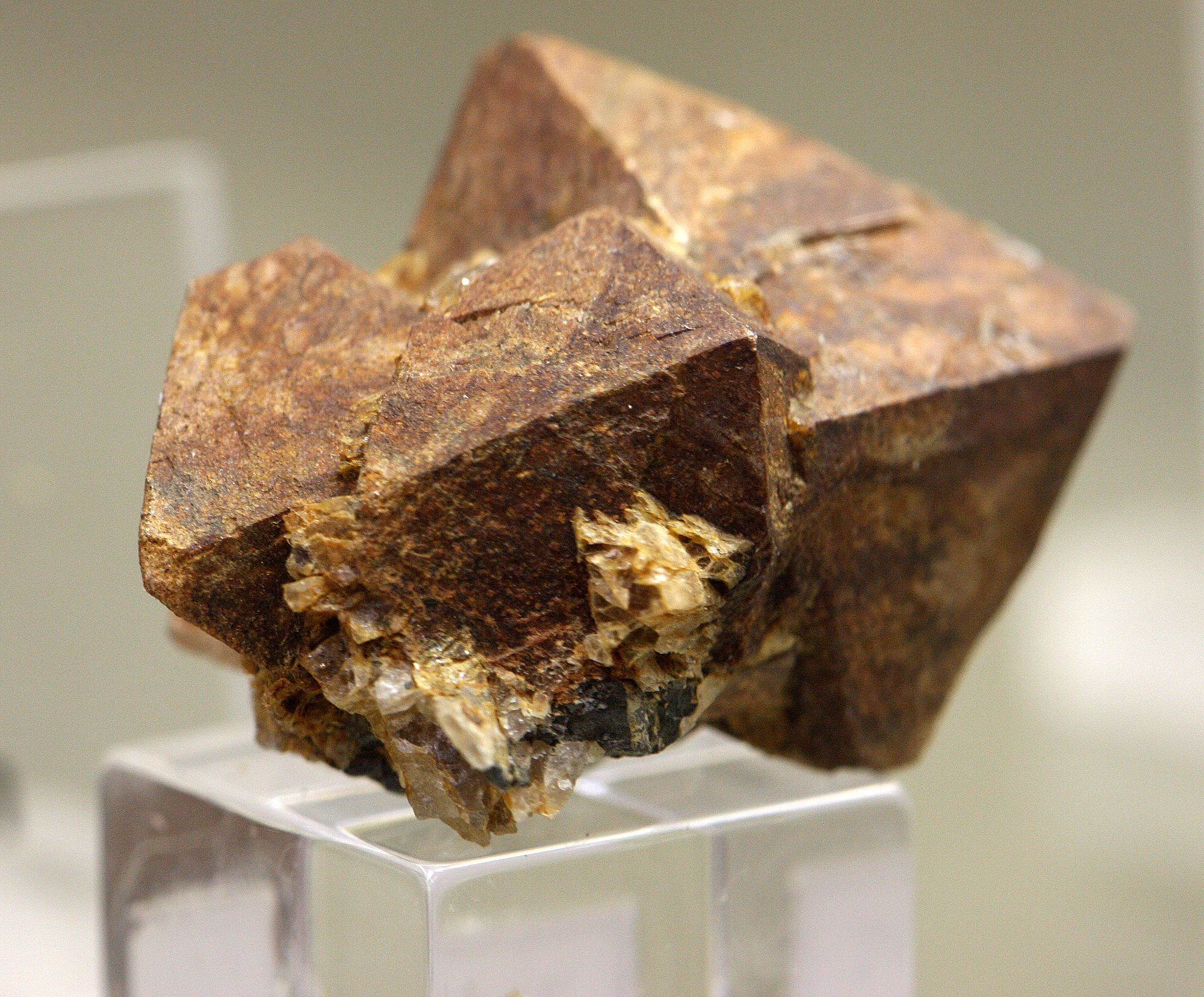
Xenotime, a mineral source of rare earth elements including terbium

Terbium occurs with other rare earth elements in many minerals, including monazite ((Ce,La,Th,Nd,Y)PO_{4} with up to 0.03% terbium), xenotime (YPO_{4}) and euxenite ((Y,Ca,Er,La,Ce,U,Th)(Nb,Ta,Ti)_{2}O_{6} with 1% or more terbium). The crust abundance of terbium is estimated as 1.2 mg/kg. No terbium-dominant mineral has yet been found.

Terbium (as the species Tb II) has been detected in the atmosphere of KELT-9b, a hot-Jupiter planet outside the Solar System.

Currently, the richest commercial sources of terbium are the ion-adsorption clays of southern China; the concentrates with about two-thirds yttrium oxide by weight have about 1% terbia. Small amounts of terbium occur in bastnäsite and monazite; when these are processed by solvent extraction to recover the valuable heavy lanthanides as samarium-europium-gadolinium concentrate, terbium is recovered therein. Due to the large volumes of bastnäsite processed relative to the ion-adsorption clays, a significant proportion of the world's terbium supply comes from bastnäsite.

In 2018, a rich terbium supply was discovered off the coast of Japan's Minamitori Island, with the stated supply being "enough to meet the global demand for 420 years".

== Production ==
Crushed terbium-containing minerals are treated with hot concentrated sulfuric acid to produce water-soluble sulfates of rare earths. The acidic filtrates are partially neutralized with caustic soda to pH 3–4. Thorium precipitates out of solution as hydroxide and is removed. The solution is treated with ammonium oxalate to convert rare earths into their insoluble oxalates. The oxalates are decomposed to oxides by heating. The oxides are dissolved in nitric acid that excludes one of the main components, cerium, whose oxide is insoluble in HNO_{3}. Terbium is separated as a double salt with ammonium nitrate by crystallization.

The most efficient separation routine for terbium salt from the rare-earth salt solution is ion exchange. In this process, rare-earth ions are sorbed onto suitable ion-exchange resin by exchange with hydrogen, ammonium or cupric ions present in the resin. The rare earth ions are then selectively washed out by suitable complexing agents. As with other rare earths, terbium metal is produced by reducing the anhydrous chloride or fluoride with calcium metal. Calcium and tantalum impurities can be removed by vacuum remelting, distillation, amalgam formation or zone melting.

In 2020, the annual demand for terbium was estimated at 340 tonnes (750,000 lb). Terbium is not distinguished from other rare earths in the United States Geological Survey's Mineral Commodity Summaries, which in 2024 estimated the global reserves of rare earth minerals at 110,000,000 tonnes (2.4×10^{11} lb).

== Applications ==
Terbium is used as a dopant in calcium fluoride, calcium tungstate, and strontium molybdate, materials that are used in solid-state devices, and as a crystal stabilizer of fuel cells which operate at elevated temperatures, together with zirconium dioxide (ZrO_{2}).

Terbium is also used in alloys and in the production of electronic devices. As a component of Terfenol-D, terbium is used in actuators, in naval sonar systems, sensors, and other magnetomechanical devices. Terfenol-D is a terbium alloy that expands or contracts in the presence of a magnetic field. It has the highest magnetostriction of any alloy. It is used to increase verdet constant in long-distance fiber optic communication. Terbium-doped garnets are also used in optical isolators, which prevents reflected light from traveling back along the optical fiber.

Terbium oxides are used in green phosphors in fluorescent lamps, color TV tubes, and flat screen monitors. Terbium, along with all other lanthanides except lanthanum and lutetium, is luminescent in the 3+ oxidation state. The brilliant fluorescence allows terbium to be used as a probe in biochemistry, where it somewhat resembles calcium in its behavior. Terbium "green" phosphors (which fluoresce a brilliant lemon-yellow) are combined with divalent europium blue phosphors and trivalent europium red phosphors to provide trichromatic lighting, which is by far the largest consumer of the world's terbium supply. Trichromatic lighting provides much higher light output for a given amount of electrical energy than does incandescent lighting.

In 2023, terbium compounds were used to create a lattice with a single iron atom that was then examined by synchrotron x-ray beam. This was the first successful attempt to characterize a single atom at sub-atomic levels.

== Safety ==
Terbium, along with many of the other rare earth elements, is poorly studied in terms of its toxicology and environmental impacts. Few health-based guidance values for safe exposure to terbium are available. No values are established in the United States by the Occupational Safety and Health Administration or American Conference of Governmental Industrial Hygienists at which terbium exposure becomes hazardous, and it is not considered a hazardous substance under the Globally Harmonized System of Classification and Labelling of Chemicals.

Reviews of the toxicity of the rare earth elements place terbium and its compounds as "of low to moderately toxicity", remarking on the lack of detailed studies on their hazards and the lack of market demand forestalling evidence of toxicity.

Some studies demonstrate environmental accumulation of terbium as hazardous to fish and plants. High exposures of terbium may enhance the toxicity of other substances causing endocytosis in plant cells.

== See also ==
- Terbium compounds
- List of elements facing shortage
