= Terbium(III) sulfate =

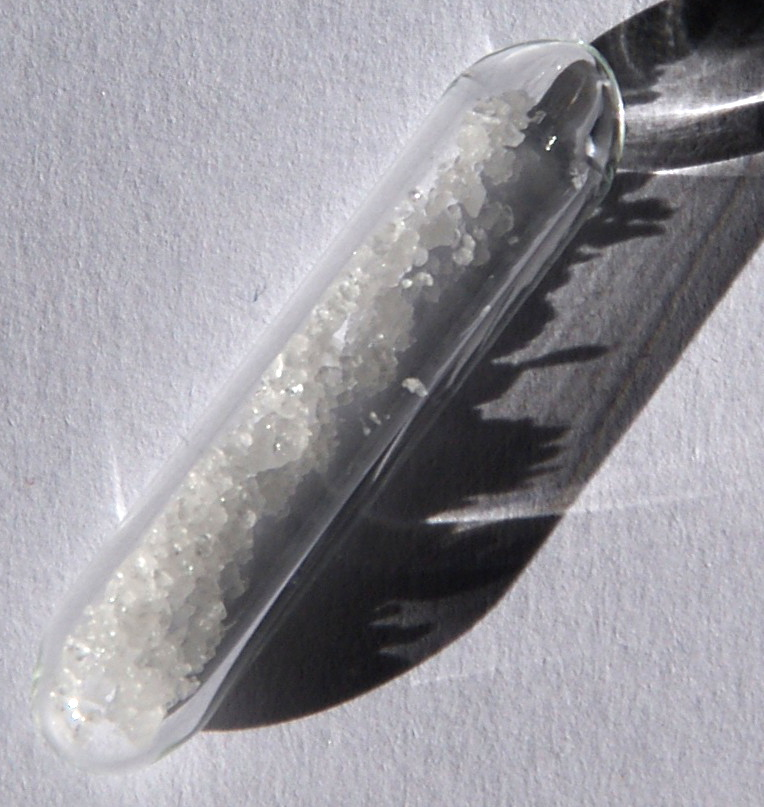

Names
- Other names: Diterbium trisulphate; Terbium trisulfate

Identifiers
CAS Number	anhydrous: 13692-99-4; octahydrate: 13842-67-6
3D model (JSmol)	anhydrous: Interactive image; octahydrate: Interactive image
ChemSpider	anhydrous: 146015; octahydrate: 17339487
ECHA InfoCard	100.033.815
EC Number	anhydrous: 237-213-5; octahydrate: 634-368-4
PubChem CID	anhydrous: 166885; octahydrate: 16211493
CompTox Dashboard (EPA)	DTXSID30890714
- InChI: anhydrous: InChI=1S/3H2O4S.2Tb/c3*1-5(2,3)4;;/h3*(H2,1,2,3,4);;/q;;;2*+3/p-6 Key: UFPWIQQSPQSOKM-UHFFFAOYSA-H; octahydrate: InChI=1S/3H2O4S.8H2O.2Tb/c3*1-5(2,3)4;;;;;;;;;;/h3*(H2,1,2,3,4);8*1H2;;/q;;;;;;;;;;;2*+3/p-6 Key: SRSFZSUHOIHUFR-UHFFFAOYSA-H
- SMILES: anhydrous: [O-]S(=O)(=O)[O-].[O-]S(=O)(=O)[O-].[O-]S(=O)(=O)[O-].[Tb+3].[Tb+3]; octahydrate: O.O.O.O.O.O.O.O.[O-]S(=O)(=O)[O-].[O-]S(=O)(=O)[O-].[O-]S(=O)(=O)[O-].[Tb+3].[Tb+3]

Properties
Chemical formula	Tb_{2}(SO_{4})_{3}
Molar mass	606.02 g·mol^{−1}
Appearance	colorless solid
Solubility in water	soluble

Structure
Crystal structure	monoclinic (octahydrate)
Space group	C2/c (No. 15)
Lattice constant	a = 13.493 Å, b = 6.714 Å, c = 18.231 Å α = 90°, β = 102.16°, γ = 90°
Lattice volume (V)	1614.5 Å^{3}
Formula units (Z)	4 units per cell

Hazards
- GHS labelling
Pictograms	(GHS07: Exclamation mark)
Signal word	Warning
Hazard statements	H315, H319, H335
Precautionary statements	P261, P264, P264+P265, P271, P280, P302+P352, P304+P340, P305+P351+P338, P319, P321, P332+P317, P337+P317, P362+P364, P403+P233, P405, P501
- Except where otherwise noted, data are given for materials in their standard state (at 25 °C [77 °F], 100 kPa). Infobox references

Terbium(III) sulfate is an inorganic compound with the chemical formula Tb_{2}(SO_{4})_{3}. It is a colorless solid, forming monoclinic crystals.

== Properties ==
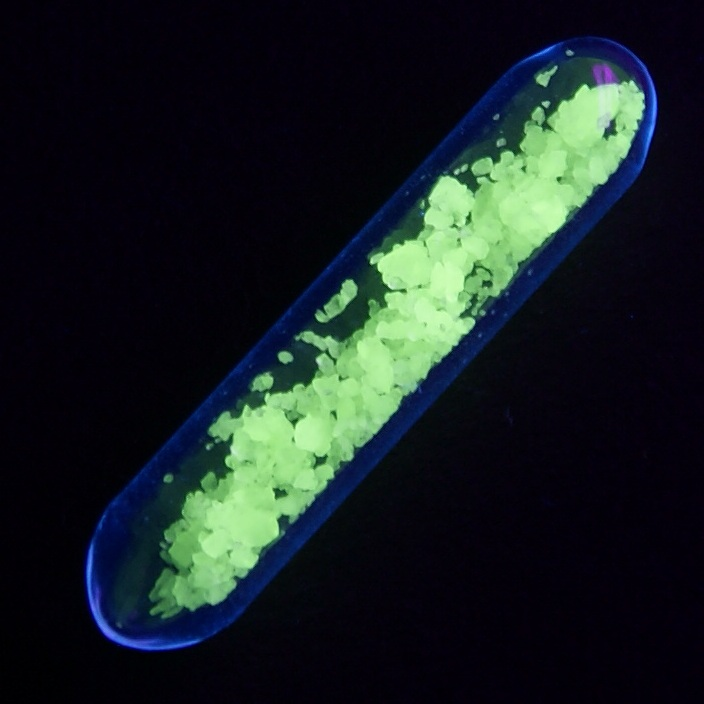
Green fluorescence of terbium sulfate under ultraviolet light

The octahydrate is isostructural with the octahydrates of praseodymium sulfate and dysprosium sulfate.

It exhibits many forms of luminescence including triboluminescence, chemiluminescence (such as during the thermal degradation of sodium persulfate in the presence of terbium sulfate), and sonoluminescence (as a suspension in benzene, toluene, or p-xylene).

== Preparation ==
The octahydrate can be prepared by treating terbium(III,IV) oxide with sulfuric acid. The anhydrous form is obtained by heating to 360 °C.

== Reactions ==
Terbium oxysulfide (Tb_{2}O_{2}S) is obtained by heating the hydrate under a reductive CO atmosphere at 1,033 K (760 °C; 1,400 °F). If an air atmosphere is used instead, a terbium oxysulfate (Tb_{2}O_{2}SO_{4}) forms at 1,323 K (1,050 °C; 1,922 °F).

== Related compounds ==
Double sulfates such as sodium terbium sulfate are formed in the separation of lanthanides by fractional precipitation, a historically employed method.

A hydrogensulfate sulfate (Tb(HSO_{4})(SO_{4})) has been characterized. It is prepared by solvothermal synthesis, crystallizes in the P2_{1} space group, and exhibits second-harmonic generation.

Several terbium sulfate-based solid state materials have been characterized by single-crystal X-ray diffraction. For example, inorganic frameworks such as the 1D (H_{3}O)_{2}(C_{2}H_{8}N)[Tb(SO_{4})_{3}] and 3D (C_{2}H_{8}N)_{9}[Tb_{5}(SO_{4})_{12}]·2H_{2}O. Such compounds are of research interest due to their photoluminescent properties.
