= Terbium(III) oxide =

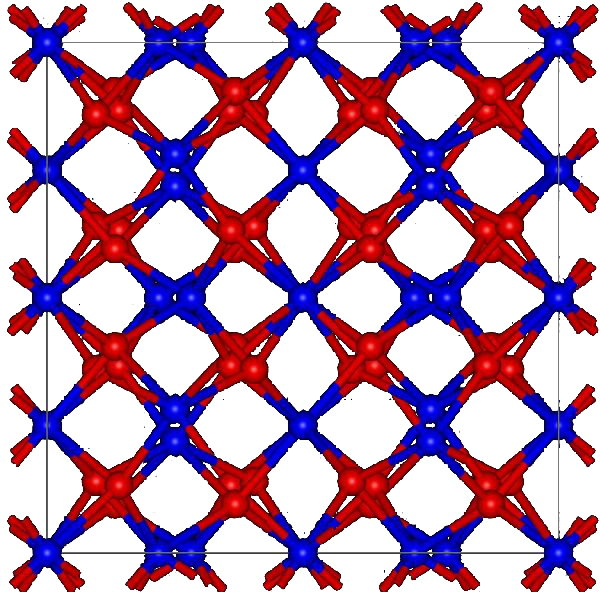

Names
- IUPAC name terbium(III) oxide
- Other names terbium trioxide, terbia, terbium sesquioxide

Identifiers
CAS Number	12036-41-8
3D model (JSmol)	Interactive image
ChemSpider	140187
ECHA InfoCard	100.031.668
EC Number	234-849-5
PubChem CID	159410
CompTox Dashboard (EPA)	DTXSID401014252 DTXSID40276469, DTXSID401014252
- InChI: Key: SCRZPWWVSXWCMC-UHFFFAOYSA-N; InChI=1/3O.2Tb/q3*-2;2*+3
- SMILES: O=[Tb]O[Tb]=O

Properties
Chemical formula	O_{3}Tb_{2}
Molar mass	365.848 g·mol^{−1}
Appearance	white crystals
Density	7.91 g/cm^{3}
Melting point	2,410 °C (4,370 °F; 2,680 K)
Magnetic susceptibility (χ)	0.07834 cm^{3}/mol

Structure
Crystal structure	Cubic, cI80
Space group	Ia3̅, No. 206
Lattice constant	a = 1.057 nm

Thermochemistry
Std molar entropy (S^{⦵}_{298})	156.90 J/mol·K
Std enthalpy of formation (Δ_{f}H^{⦵}_{298})	−1865.23 kJ/mol
Gibbs free energy (Δ_{f}G^{⦵})	−1776.553 kJ/mol

Hazards
- GHS labelling
Pictograms	(GHS07: Exclamation mark) (GHS09: Environmental hazard)
Signal word	Warning
Hazard statements	H319, H410
Precautionary statements	P264, P273, P280, P305+P351+P338, P337+P313, P391, P501

Related compounds
Other anions	Terbium(III) chloride
Other cations	Gadolinium(III) oxide Dysprosium(III) oxide
- Except where otherwise noted, data are given for materials in their standard state (at 25 °C [77 °F], 100 kPa). verify (what is ?) Infobox references

Terbium(III) oxide, also known as terbium sesquioxide, is a sesquioxide of the rare earth metal terbium, having chemical formula Tb_{2}O_{3}. It is a p-type semiconductor, which conducts protons, which is enhanced when doped with calcium. It may be prepared by the reduction of Tb_{4}O_{7} in hydrogen at 1300 °C for 24 hours.

Tb_{4}O_{7} + H_{2} → 2 Tb_{2}O_{3} + H_{2}O

It is a basic oxide and easily dissolved to dilute acids, and then almost colourless terbium salt is formed.

Tb_{2}O_{3} + 6 H^{+} → 2 Tb^{3+} + 3 H_{2}O

The crystal structure is cubic and the lattice constant is a = 1057 pm.
