= Terbium(III) chloride =

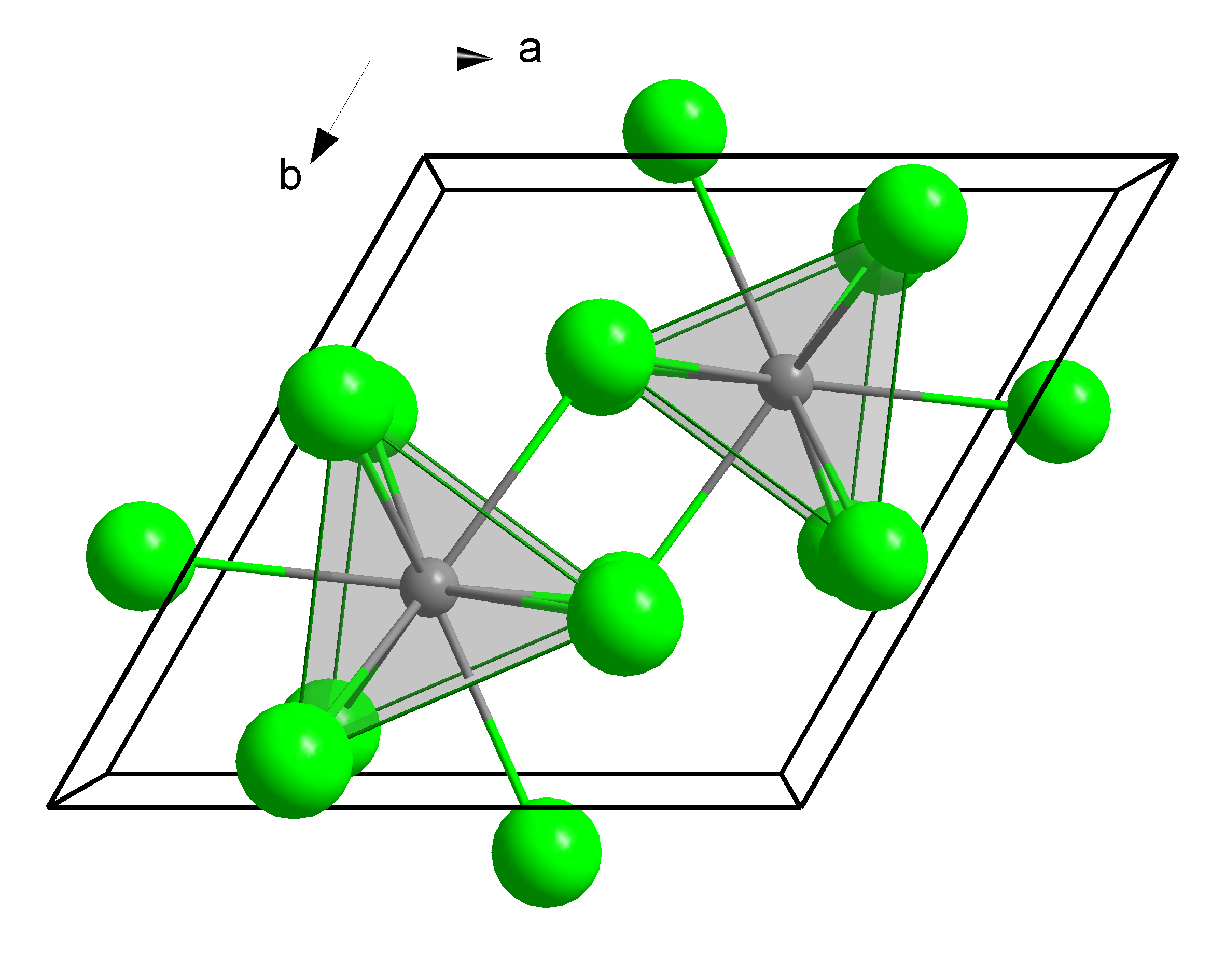

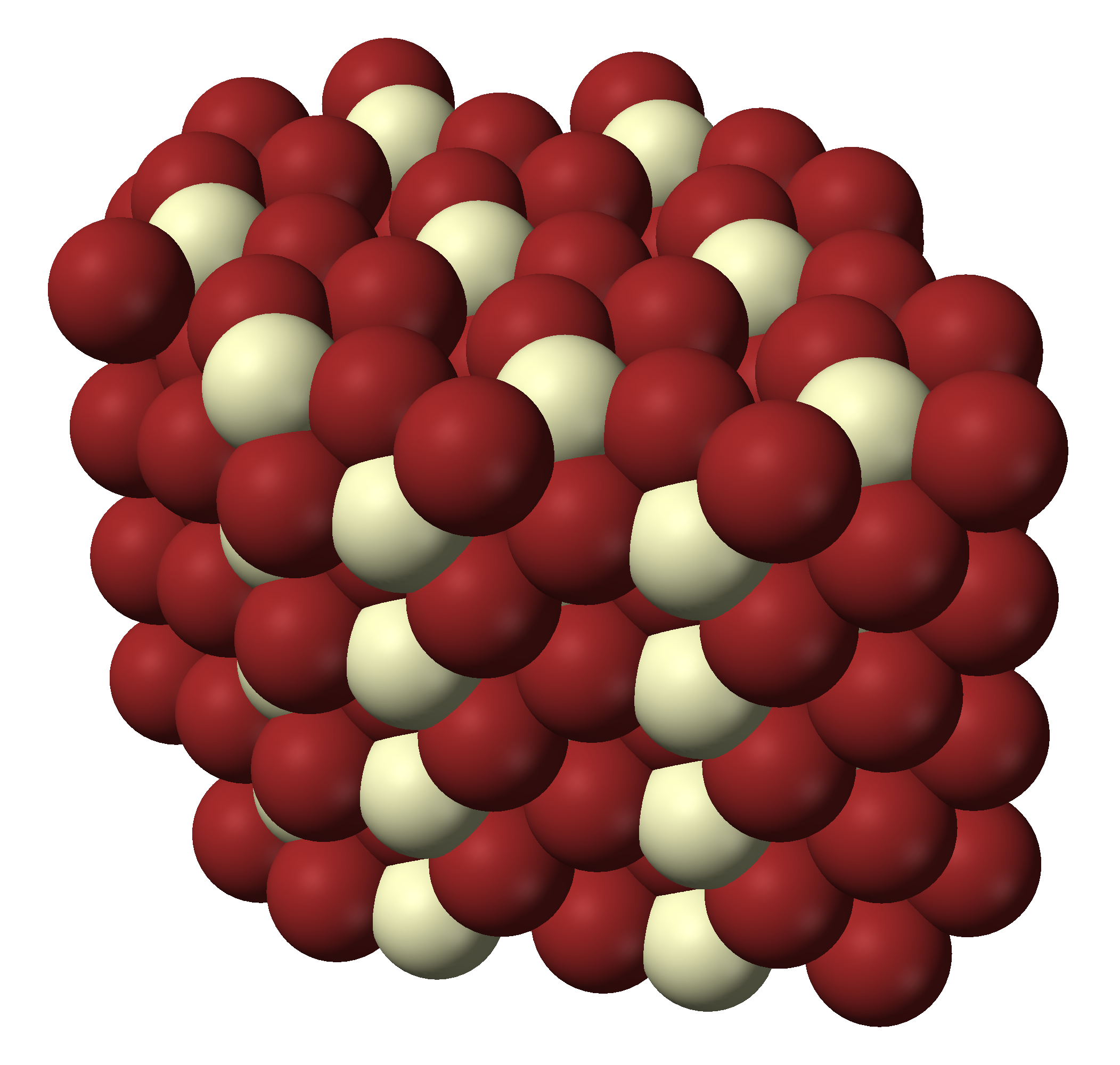

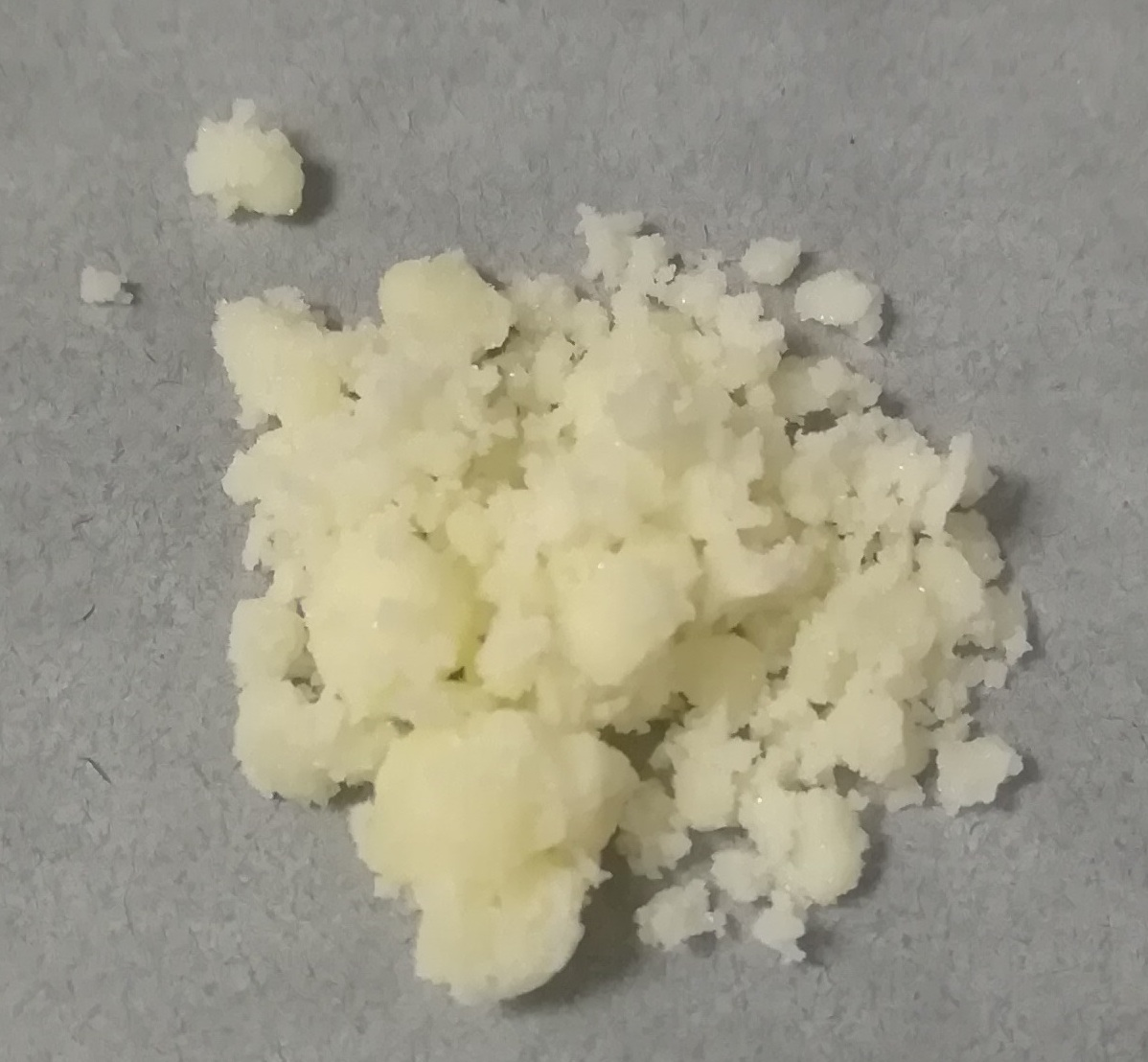

Names
- Other names terbium trichloride

Identifiers
CAS Number	10042-88-3
3D model (JSmol)	Interactive image
ChemSpider	55380
ECHA InfoCard	100.030.108
EC Number	233-132-4
PubChem CID	61458
UNII	804HI855F8
CompTox Dashboard (EPA)	DTXSID9064926
- InChI: InChI=1S/3ClH.Tb/h3*1H;/q;;;+3/p-3 Key: GFISHBQNVWAVFU-UHFFFAOYSA-K
- SMILES: Cl[Tb](Cl)Cl

Properties
Chemical formula	TbCl_{3}
Molar mass	265.2834 g/mol
Appearance	white powder
Density	4.35 g/cm^{3}, solid
Melting point	558 °C (1,036 °F; 831 K)
Boiling point	180 to 200 °C (356 to 392 °F; 453 to 473 K) (in HCl gas atmosphere)
Solubility in water	soluble

Structure
Crystal structure	hexagonal (UCl_{3} type), hP8
Space group	P6_{3}/m, No. 176
Coordination geometry	Tricapped trigonal prismatic (nine-coordinate)

Hazards
- GHS labelling
Pictograms	(GHS07: Exclamation mark)
Signal word	Warning
Hazard statements	H315, H319
Precautionary statements	P302+P352, P305+P351+P338

Related compounds
Other anions	Terbium(III) oxide
Other cations	Gadolinium(III) chloride Dysprosium(III) chloride
- Except where otherwise noted, data are given for materials in their standard state (at 25 °C [77 °F], 100 kPa). verify (what is ?) Infobox references

Terbium(III) chloride (TbCl_{3}) is a chemical compound. In the solid state TbCl_{3} has the YCl_{3} layer structure. Terbium(III) chloride frequently forms a hexahydrate.

== Preparation ==
The hexahydrate of terbium(III) chloride can be obtained by the reaction of terbium(III) oxide and hydrochloric acid:

Tb_{2}O_{3} + 6 HCl → 2 TbCl_{3} + 3 H_{2}O

It can also be obtained by direct reaction of the elements:

2 Tb + 3 Cl_{2} → 2 TbCl_{3}

== Properties ==
Terbium(III) chloride is a white, hygroscopic powder. It crystallizes in an orthorhombic plutonium(III) bromide crystal structure with space group Cmcm (No. 63). It can form a complex Tb(gly)_{3}Cl_{3}·3H_{2}O with glycine.

== Applications ==
The hexahydrate plays an important role as an activator of green phosphors in color TV tubes and is also used in specialty lasers and as a dopant in solid-state devices.

== Hazards ==
Terbium(III) chloride causes hyperemia of the iris.
