= Holmium arsenide =

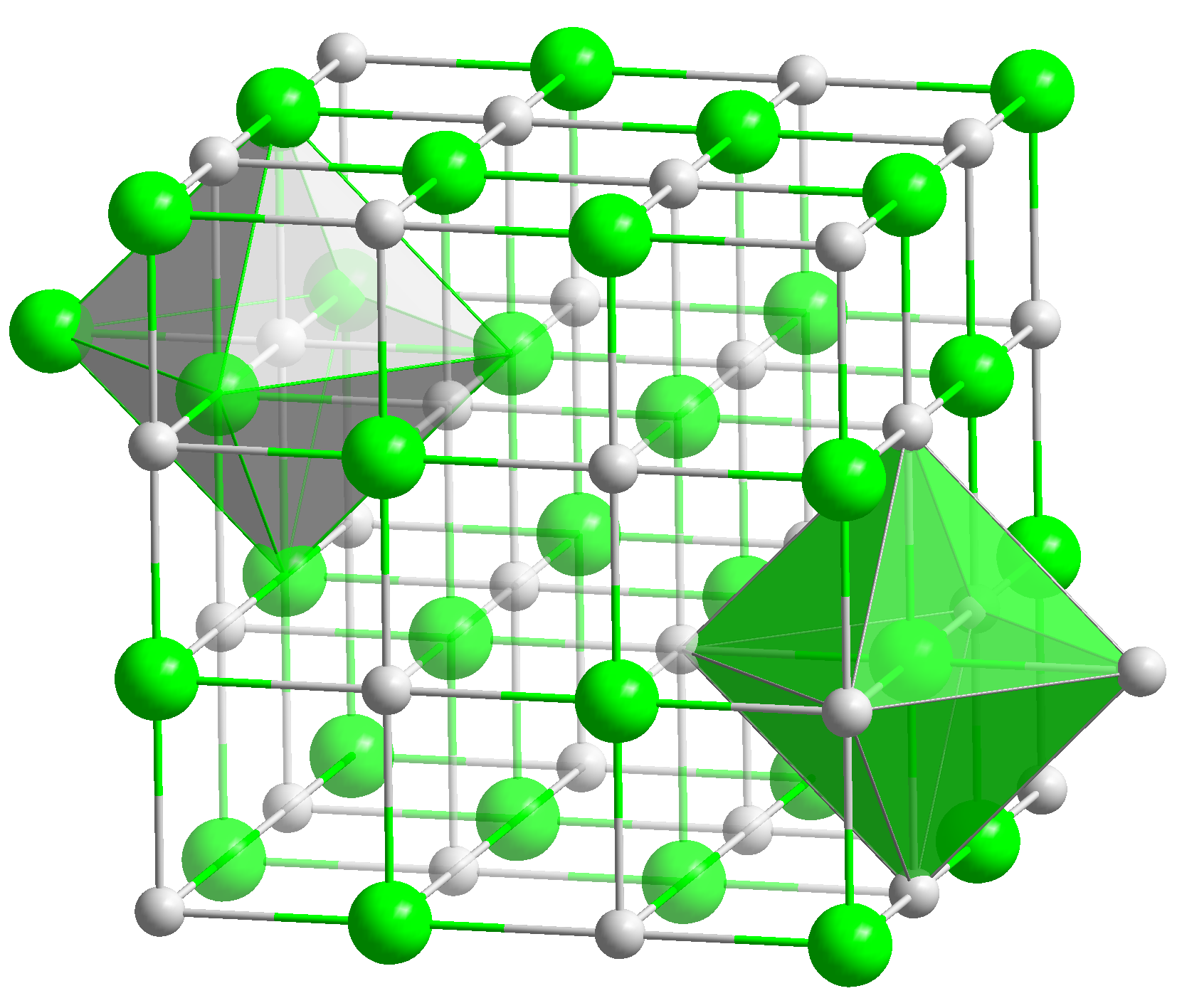

Names
- Other names Holmium monoarsenide, arsanylidyneholmium

Identifiers
CAS Number	12005-92-4
3D model (JSmol)	Interactive image
ChemSpider	74703
EC Number	234-476-8
PubChem CID	82781
CompTox Dashboard (EPA)	DTXSID201191880
- InChI: InChI=1S/As.Ho Key: TZCMHASVZNWCGN-UHFFFAOYSA-N
- SMILES: [As]#[Ho]

Properties
Chemical formula	AsHo
Molar mass	239.851923 g·mol^{−1}
Appearance	Black crystalline powder
Density	8.17 g/cm^{3}

Related compounds
Other anions	Holmium nitride Holmium phosphide Holmium antimonide Holmium bismuthide
Other cations	Dysprosium phosphide Erbium phosphide
- Except where otherwise noted, data are given for materials in their standard state (at 25 °C [77 °F], 100 kPa). Infobox references

Holmium arsenide is a binary inorganic compound of holmium and arsenide with the chemical formula HoAs.

== Physical properties ==
HoAs demonstrates arsenic volatilization upon heating. The compound is halite or rock-salt structured, crystallizing in the cubic Fm3̅m space group.
