= Holmium bismuthide =

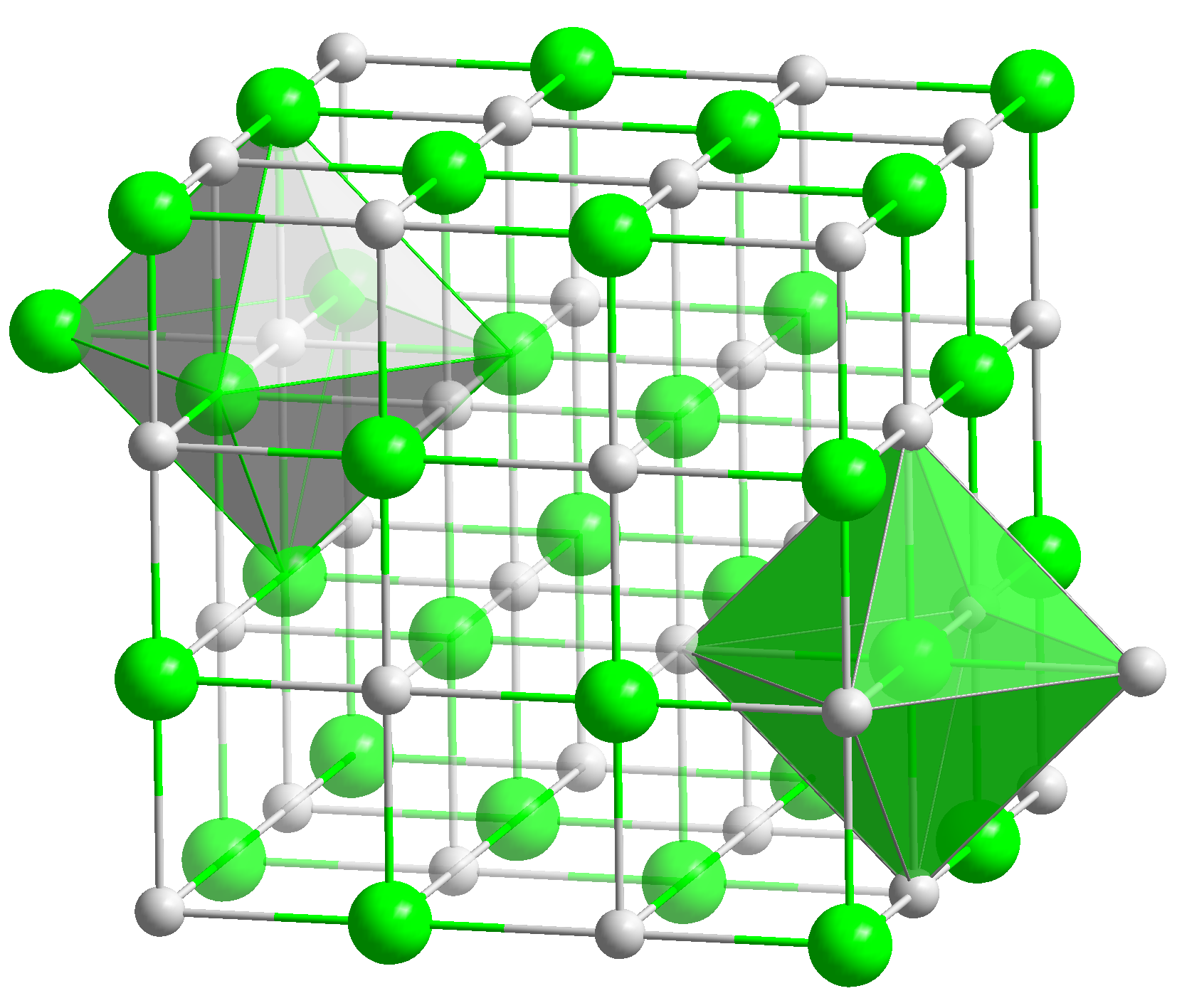

Names
- Other names Holmium monobismuthide

Identifiers
CAS Number	12010-45-6
3D model (JSmol)	Interactive image
ChemSpider	20137869
EC Number	234-552-0
PubChem CID	6336865
CompTox Dashboard (EPA)	DTXSID4065159
- InChI: InChI=1S/Bi.Ho Key: ZENJQEGOGPMIBF-UHFFFAOYSA-N
- SMILES: [Ho].[Bi]

Properties
Chemical formula	HoSb
Molar mass	286.690 g·mol^{−1}

Related compounds
Other anions	Holmium nitride Holmium phosphide Holmium arsenide Holmium antimonide
Other cations	Dysprosium phosphide Erbium phosphide
- Except where otherwise noted, data are given for materials in their standard state (at 25 °C [77 °F], 100 kPa). Infobox references

Holmium bismuthide is a binary inorganic compound of holmium and bismuth with the chemical formula HoBi.

== Physical properties ==
The compound is rock-salt structured, crystallizing in the cubic cF8 space group.

== Related ==
The bismuthide oxide compound Ho_{2}BiO_{2} has a tetragonal structure.
