= Holmium phosphate =

Names
- Other names Holmium orthophosphate

Identifiers
CAS Number	anhydrous: 14298-39-6; dihydrate: 16827-78-4
3D model (JSmol)	Interactive image
ChemSpider	13658170
EC Number	238-235-8
PubChem CID	16217787
CompTox Dashboard (EPA)	DTXSID20162270
- InChI: InChI=1S/Ho.H3O4P/c;1-5(2,3)4/h;(H3,1,2,3,4)/q+3;/p-3 Key: ZFEZZRFBMNCXLQ-UHFFFAOYSA-K
- SMILES: [O-]P(=O)([O-])[O-].[Ho+3]

Properties
Chemical formula	HoPO_{4}
Molar mass	259.90 g/mol
Appearance	Solid
Solubility in water	Very slightly soluble in water

Structure
Crystal structure	Tetragonal, xenotime type
Space group	I4_{1}/amd, No. 141
- Except where otherwise noted, data are given for materials in their standard state (at 25 °C [77 °F], 100 kPa). Infobox references

Holmium phosphate is an inorganic compound of holmium and phosphate with the chemical formula HoPO_{4}. Hydrated forms are also known.

== Structure and properties ==
Anhydrous holmium phosphate crystallizes in the tetragonal crystal system with the xenotime structure, which is isostructural with zircon. It belongs to space group I4_{1}/amd (No. 141).

Its structure consists of isolated PO_{4} tetrahedra and eight-coordinate Ho^{3+} ions. Alternating HoO_{8} and PO_{4} polyhedra form chains parallel to the crystallographic c axis.

Hydrated holmium phosphate has also been reported in an orthorhombic form. Early powder diffraction work assigned this hydrated phase to space group P222, with eight formula units per unit cell. Other work on hydrated rare-earth orthophosphates found HoPO_{4} hydrates to be closely related to tetragonal xenotime-type structures, with water occupying interstitial positions.

=== Magnetic properties ===
HoPO_{4} is strongly magnetically anisotropic at low temperature. Magnetic susceptibility and heat capacity measurements show an antiferromagnetic transition at approximately 1.39 K.

The magnetic behaviour is approximately Ising-like, with the easy axis along the tetragonal c direction. The ordered state has been described as a simple two-sublattice antiferromagnetic structure.

Crystal field spectroscopy and magnetic susceptibility measurements have also been used to determine the low-lying Ho^{3+} crystal-field levels in HoPO_{4}.

=== High-pressure behaviour ===
Single-crystal X-ray diffraction and first-principles calculations show that xenotime-type HoPO_{4} remains mechanically stable over a substantial pressure range. Under compression, its elastic anisotropy increases and the material is more resistant to volume compression than to shear deformation.

== Preparation ==
Hydrated holmium phosphate can be prepared by precipitation from aqueous solutions containing Ho^{3+} and phosphate ions. A dihydrate has been obtained by reaction of holmium(III) nitrate with dilute phosphoric acid.

Anhydrous HoPO_{4} single crystals can be grown from a PbO–P_{2}O_{5} flux using holmium(III) oxide and ammonium dihydrogen phosphate.

== Reactions ==
At high temperature, HoPO_{4} reacts with sodium molybdate to form the mixed phosphate molybdate Na_{2}Ho(MoO_{4})(PO_{4}).

The resulting Na_{2}Ho(MoO_{4})(PO_{4}) is orthorhombic and belongs to a family of layered rare-earth phosphate molybdates.
