= Holmium antimonide =

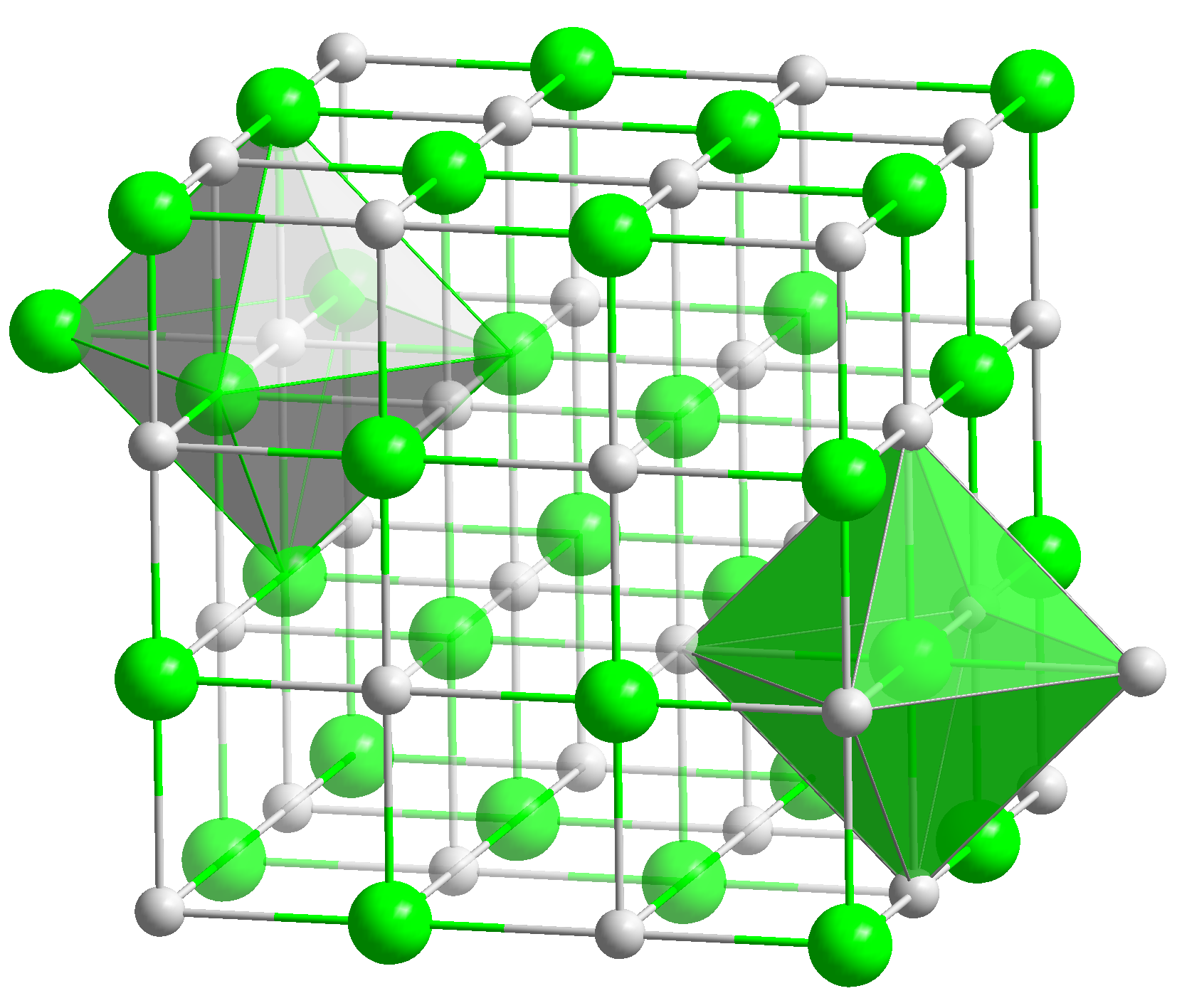

Names
- Other names Holmium monoantimonide

Identifiers
CAS Number	12029-86-6
3D model (JSmol)	Interactive image
ChemSpider	20137705
EC Number	234-738-1
PubChem CID	20835930
- InChI: InChI=1S/Ho.Sb Key: YKTSXCSFAGWXCQ-UHFFFAOYSA-N
- SMILES: [Ho].[Sb]

Properties
Chemical formula	HoSb
Molar mass	286.690 g·mol^{−1}
Density	8.06 g/cm^{3}

Related compounds
Other anions	Holmium nitride Holmium phosphide Holmium arsenide Holmium bismuthide
Other cations	Dysprosium phosphide Erbium phosphide
- Except where otherwise noted, data are given for materials in their standard state (at 25 °C [77 °F], 100 kPa). Infobox references

Holmium antimonide is a binary inorganic compound of holmium and antimony with the chemical formula HoSb.

== Physical properties ==
HoSb orders antiferromagnetically below 5.7 K.

The compound is rock-salt structured, crystallizing in the cubic Fm3̅m space group.
