= Dysprosium arsenide =

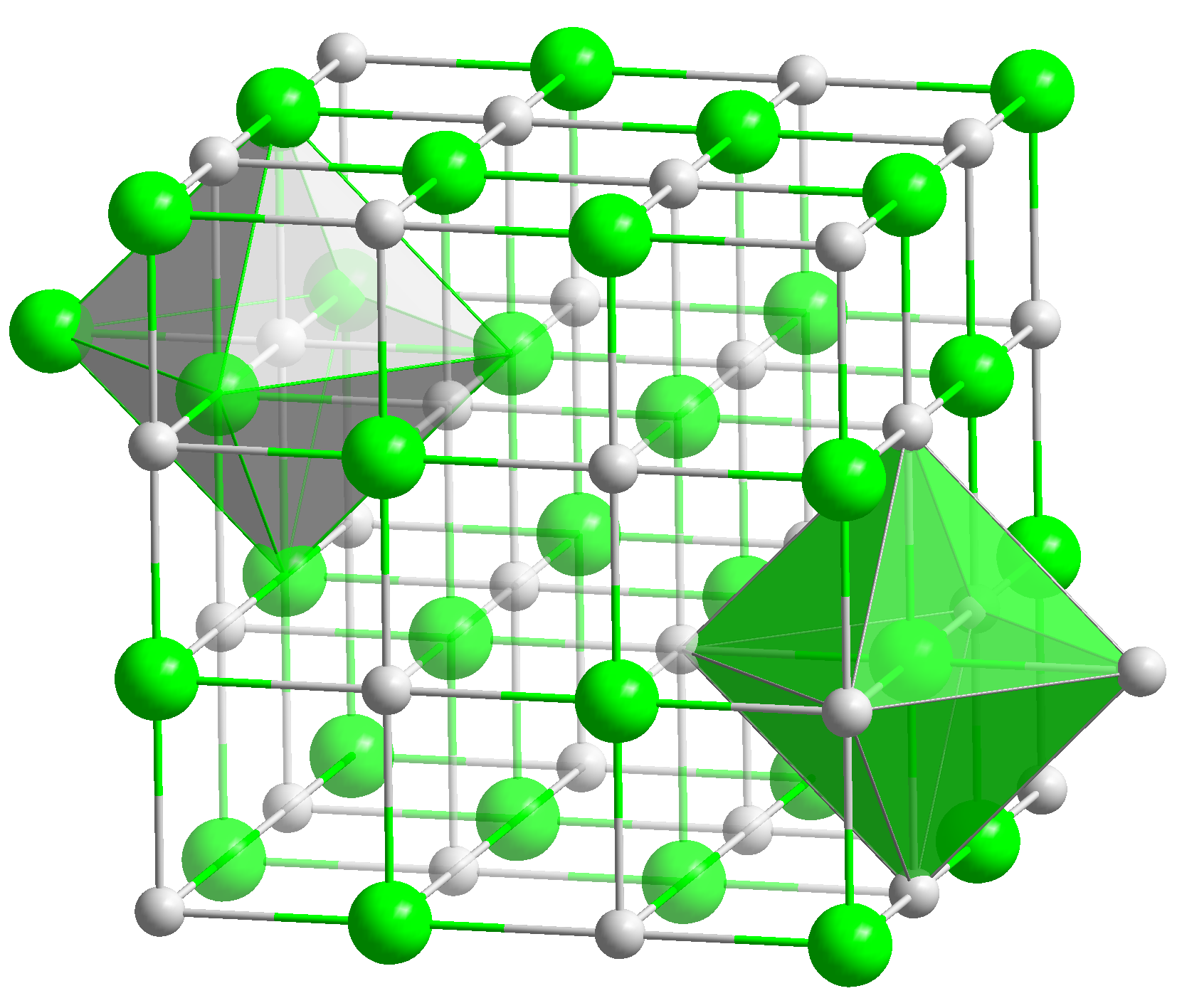

Names
- Other names Dysprosium monoarsenide, arsanylidynedysprosium

Identifiers
CAS Number	12005-81-1
3D model (JSmol)	Interactive image
ChemSpider	74701
EC Number	234-473-1
PubChem CID	82779
CompTox Dashboard (EPA)	DTXSID601104394
- InChI: InChI=1S/As.Dy Key: TXXIVYCVWJEMOA-UHFFFAOYSA-N
- SMILES: [As]#[Dy]

Properties
Chemical formula	AsDy
Molar mass	237.422 g·mol^{−1}
Appearance	Crystalline
Density	g/cm^{3}

Related compounds
Other anions	Dysprosium nitride Dysprosium phosphide Dysprosium antimonide Dysprosium bismuthide
Other cations	Terbium phosphide Holmium phosphide
- Except where otherwise noted, data are given for materials in their standard state (at 25 °C [77 °F], 100 kPa). Infobox references

Dysprosium arsenide is a binary inorganic compound of dysprosium and arsenide with the chemical formula DyAs.

== Physical properties ==
The compound is rock-salt structured, crystallizing in the cubic Fm3̅m space group.

== Uses ==
DyAs could be used as a semiconductor and in photo optic applications.

== Related ==
DyRuAsO is an arsenide oxide that also include ruthenium.
