= Dysprosium bismuthide =

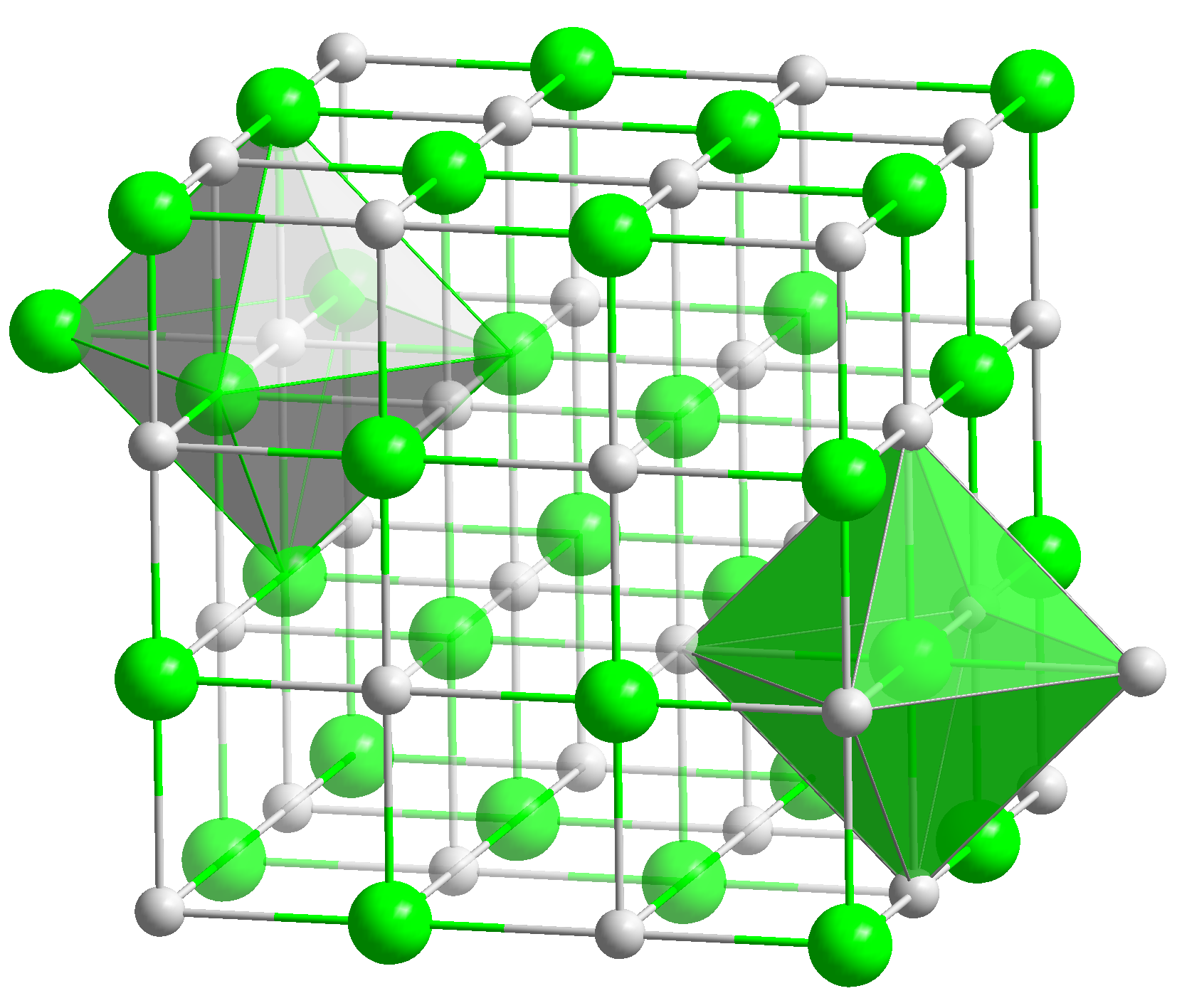

Names
- Other names Dysprosium monobismuthide

Identifiers
CAS Number	12010-41-2
3D model (JSmol)	Interactive image
ChemSpider	4891856
ECHA InfoCard	100.031.396
EC Number	234-549-4
PubChem CID	6336863
CompTox Dashboard (EPA)	DTXSID4065157
- InChI: InChI=1S/Bi.Dy Key: BVHFJALZPBQLLT-UHFFFAOYSA-N
- SMILES: [Dy].[Bi]

Properties
Chemical formula	BiDy
Molar mass	371.480 g·mol^{−1}
Appearance	powder
Density	10.11 g/cm^{3}
Melting point	2,050 °C (3,720 °F; 2,320 K)

Related compounds
Other anions	Dysprosium nitride Dysprosium phosphide Dysprosium arsenide Dysprosium antimonide
Other cations	Terbium phosphide Holmium phosphide
Related compounds	Dy_{5}Bi_{3}
- Except where otherwise noted, data are given for materials in their standard state (at 25 °C [77 °F], 100 kPa). Infobox references

Dysprosium bismuthide is a binary inorganic compound of dysprosium and bismuth with the chemical formula DyBi.

== Physical properties ==
The compound is rock-salt structured, crystallizing in the cubic Fm3̅m space group with unit cell dimension of a=6.249 Å.
