= Holmium arsenate =

Names
- Other names Holmium(III) arsenate

Identifiers
CAS Number	28548-43-8
3D model (JSmol)	Interactive image
PubChem CID	173858118
- InChI: InChI=1S/AsH3O4.Ho/c2-1(3,4)5;/h(H3,2,3,4,5);/q;+3/p-3 Key: NMYCNFKAWDKWTM-UHFFFAOYSA-K
- SMILES: [Ho+3].[O-][As]([O-])([O-])=O

Properties
Chemical formula	HoAsO_{4}
Molar mass	303.85 g/mol
Appearance	Very pale pinkish-white crystalline solid
Density	6.420 g/cm^{3} (calculated, 25 °C)
Solubility in water	Sparingly soluble in water

Structure
Crystal structure	Tetragonal, xenotime type
Space group	I4_{1}/amd, No. 141
Lattice constant	a = 0.70548 nm, c = 0.63159 nm
Formula units (Z)	4
- Except where otherwise noted, data are given for materials in their standard state (at 25 °C [77 °F], 100 kPa). Infobox references

Holmium arsenate is an inorganic compound of holmium and the arsenate ion, with the chemical formula HoAsO_{4}. It is a very pale pinkish-white, sparingly soluble crystalline solid and adopts the tetragonal xenotime structure type.

== Preparation ==
Holmium arsenate can be prepared by precipitation from aqueous solutions containing holmium(III) and arsenate ions. For example, holmium(III) chloride reacts with sodium arsenate:

HoCl_{3} + Na_{3}AsO_{4} → HoAsO_{4}↓ + 3 NaCl

This preparation has been reported as part of systematic syntheses of rare-earth arsenates.

A reference sample for powder-diffraction measurements was prepared from an aqueous solution of arsenic pentoxide and holmium trichloride.

== Properties ==
=== Crystal structure ===
Holmium arsenate crystallizes in the tetragonal crystal system, space group I4_{1}/amd (No. 141), with the xenotime or zircon structure type.

At 25 °C, the lattice parameters are a = 7.0548 Å, c = 6.3159 Å with four formula units per unit cell. The calculated density is 6.420 g/cm^{3}.

The structure consists of isolated AsO^{3−}_{4} tetrahedra and eight-coordinate Ho^{3+} ions. The HoO_{8} polyhedra form edge-sharing chains that are linked by arsenate tetrahedra into a three-dimensional framework.

Reported interatomic distances are approximately 1.684 Å for As–O and 2.294–2.422 Å for Ho–O.

=== Solubility ===
Holmium arsenate is very sparingly soluble in water. A concentration-based solubility-product value of pK_{sp,c} = 23.87±0.08 has been reported.

=== Vibrational properties ===
Polarized Raman spectroscopy of HoAsO_{4} shows the characteristic internal vibrations of the AsO_{4} tetrahedra and lattice modes of the xenotime structure.
