= Holmium perchlorate =

Names
- Other names Holmium(III) perchlorate

Identifiers
CAS Number	14017-54-0; 14692-19-4 octahydrate; 14692-16-1 nonahydrate

Properties
Chemical formula	Ho(ClO_{4})_{3}
Molar mass	463.28 g/mol
Appearance	Crystalline solid
Solubility in water	Soluble in water

Structure
Crystal structure	Hexagonal (anhydrous)
Space group	P6_{3}/m, No. 176
Lattice constant	a = 0.9218 nm, c = 0.5618 nm
Formula units (Z)	2
- Except where otherwise noted, data are given for materials in their standard state (at 25 °C [77 °F], 100 kPa). Infobox references

Holmium perchlorate is an inorganic compound of holmium and the perchlorate ion, with the formula Ho(ClO_{4})_{3}. It is known in anhydrous form and as several hydrates, including octa- and nonahydrates. In dilute aqueous solution, Ho^{3+} occurs principally as the octaaqua ion [Ho(H_{2}O)_{8}]^{3+}.

== Preparation ==
Hydrated holmium perchlorate can be prepared by dissolving holmium(III) oxide in aqueous perchloric acid:

Ho_{2}O_{3} + 6 HClO_{4} → 2 Ho(ClO_{4})_{3} + 3 H_{2}O

A modern spectroscopic study prepared aqueous Ho(ClO_{4})_{3} by dissolving Ho_{2}O_{3} in 6 mol/L perchloric acid and subsequently diluting the resulting stock solution.

Anhydrous Ho(ClO_{4})_{3} has been prepared from hydrated material using chlorine oxide dehydrating agents under reduced pressure. Because anhydrous rare-earth perchlorates are strong oxidizers and can be sensitive to shock or contact with oxidizable substances, such preparations require careful handling.

== Properties ==
=== Anhydrous structure ===
Anhydrous Ho(ClO_{4})_{3} crystallizes in the hexagonal crystal system, space group P6_{3}/m (No. 176), with two formula units per unit cell.

Its lattice parameters are a = 9.218(1) Å, c = 5.618(1) Å. It belongs to the common structural family of anhydrous lanthanide perchlorates extending from lanthanum through the low-temperature form of thulium.

In this structure the lanthanide ions are nine-coordinate. The oxygen atoms belong to tridentate perchlorate groups, producing a channel-containing three-dimensional structure.

The progressive decrease in the lattice parameters from La(ClO_{4})_{3} to the later lanthanides reflects the lanthanide contraction.

=== Hydrates ===
Several hydrated forms of holmium perchlorate have been reported, including the octahydrate Ho(ClO_{4})_{3}·8H_{2}O and nonahydrate Ho(ClO_{4})_{3}·9H_{2}O.

Hydrated rare-earth perchlorates are readily obtained from aqueous perchloric-acid solutions, while controlled dehydration gives lower hydrates and ultimately the anhydrous compound.

=== Aqueous solution ===
Raman spectroscopy shows that in dilute aqueous Ho(ClO_{4})_{3}, the holmium ion is predominantly present as the octaaqua complex [Ho(H_{2}O)_{8}]^{3+}.

A broad, strongly polarized Raman band at approximately 387 cm^{−1} has been assigned to the symmetric Ho–O breathing vibration of this ion. Among the heavy rare-earth ions studied, the Ho–O distance is the largest, decreasing progressively through Er, Tm, Yb and Lu as a consequence of the lanthanide contraction.

In dilute solutions, perchlorate behaves mainly as a weakly coordinating counterion. At higher concentrations, outer-sphere and contact ion pairing become increasingly important in heavy rare-earth perchlorate solutions.

== Coordination chemistry ==
Holmium perchlorate is often used as a soluble source of Ho^{3+} for the synthesis of coordination compounds.

For example, reaction with silver nitrate, isonicotinic acid and 2,2′-biphenyldicarboxylic acid under hydrothermal conditions has been used to prepare a heterometallic Ho(III)–Ag(I) coordination framework.

== Safety ==
Holmium perchlorate is an oxidizing perchlorate salt. Anhydrous lanthanide perchlorates in particular can react strongly with reducing or combustible materials and should be handled accordingly.
