= Holmium(III) sulfate =

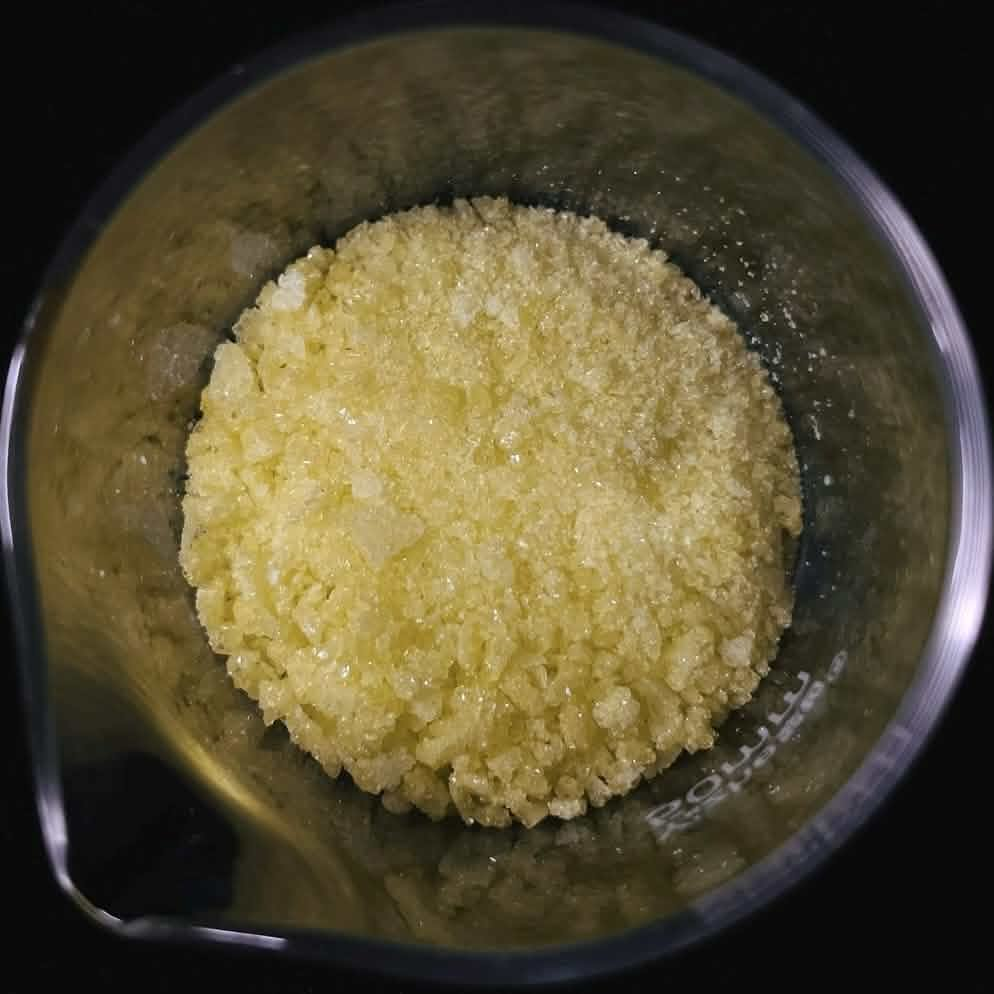
- Octahydrate

Names
- Other names: Holmium sulfate

Identifiers
CAS Number	15622-40-9; octahyddrate: 13473-57-9
3D model (JSmol)	Interactive image; monohydrate: Interactive image; octahyddrate: Interactive image
ChemSpider	146390; monohydrate: 21242007; octahyddrate: 32818082
ECHA InfoCard	100.036.073
EC Number	239-697-3; octahyddrate: 630-442-5
PubChem CID	167320; monohydrate: 25021756; octahyddrate: 57348038
CompTox Dashboard (EPA)	DTXSID60890762; octahyddrate: DTXSID90721555
- InChI: InChI=1S/2Ho.3H2O4S/c;;3*1-5(2,3)4/h;;3*(H2,1,2,3,4)/q2*+3;;;/p-6 Key: MKPJADFELTTXAV-UHFFFAOYSA-H; monohydrate: InChI=1S/2Ho.3H2O4S.H2O/c;;3*1-5(2,3)4;/h;;3*(H2,1,2,3,4);1H2/q2*+3;;;;/p-6 Key: NTBVQHGZWAVKKD-UHFFFAOYSA-H; octahyddrate: InChI=1S/2Ho.3H2O4S.8H2O/c;;3*1-5(2,3)4;;;;;;;;/h;;3*(H2,1,2,3,4);8*1H2/q2*+3;;;;;;;;;;;/p-6 Key: BGUKVZHPVQVULL-UHFFFAOYSA-H
- SMILES: [O-]S(=O)(=O)[O-].[O-]S(=O)(=O)[O-].[O-]S(=O)(=O)[O-].[Ho+3].[Ho+3]; monohydrate: O.O=S(=O)([O-])[O-].O=S(=O)([O-])[O-].O=S(=O)([O-])[O-].[Ho+3].[Ho+3]; octahyddrate: O.O.O.O.O.O.O.O.O=S(=O)([O-])[O-].O=S(=O)([O-])[O-].O=S(=O)([O-])[O-].[Ho+3].[Ho+3]

Properties
Chemical formula	Ho_{2}(SO_{4})_{3}
Molar mass	618.03 g·mol^{−1}
Appearance	Orange-yellow solid
Density	1.031 g/cm^{3}
Solubility in water	45.56 g/L (25 °C); 14.77 g/L (95 °C)

Hazards
- GHS labelling
Pictograms	(GHS07: Exclamation mark)
Signal word	Warning
Hazard statements	H315, H319, H335
Precautionary statements	P261, P264, P264+P265, P271, P280, P302+P352, P304+P340, P305+P351+P338, P319, P321, P332+P317, P337+P317, P362+P364, P403+P233, P405, P501
- Except where otherwise noted, data are given for materials in their standard state (at 25 °C [77 °F], 100 kPa). Infobox references

Holmium(III) sulfate is a holmium compound with the chemical formula Ho_{2}(SO_{4})_{3}. A hygroscopic orange-yellow octahydrate exists.

== Preparation ==
Holmium(III) sulfate can be prepared by dissolving holmium(III) oxide in sulfuric acid:

Ho_{2}O_{3} + 3 H_{2}SO_{4} → Ho_{2}(SO_{4})_{3} + 3 H_{2}O

Adding triethylamine produces a 1-D amine templated holmium(III) sulfate material.

== Reactions ==
Holmium(III) sulfate reacts with hydrogen sulfide to form holmium(III) sulfide at elevated temperatures.

Holmium(III) sulfate is a catalyst for orthohydrogen-parahydrogen conversion at cryogenic temperatures.

A holmium-silver sulfate (AgHo(SO_{4})_{2}) can be synthesized from holmium(III) sulfate and silver sulfate:

Ag_{2}SO_{4} + Ho_{2}(SO_{4})_{3} → 2AgHo(SO_{4})_{2}
