= Dysprosium antimonide =

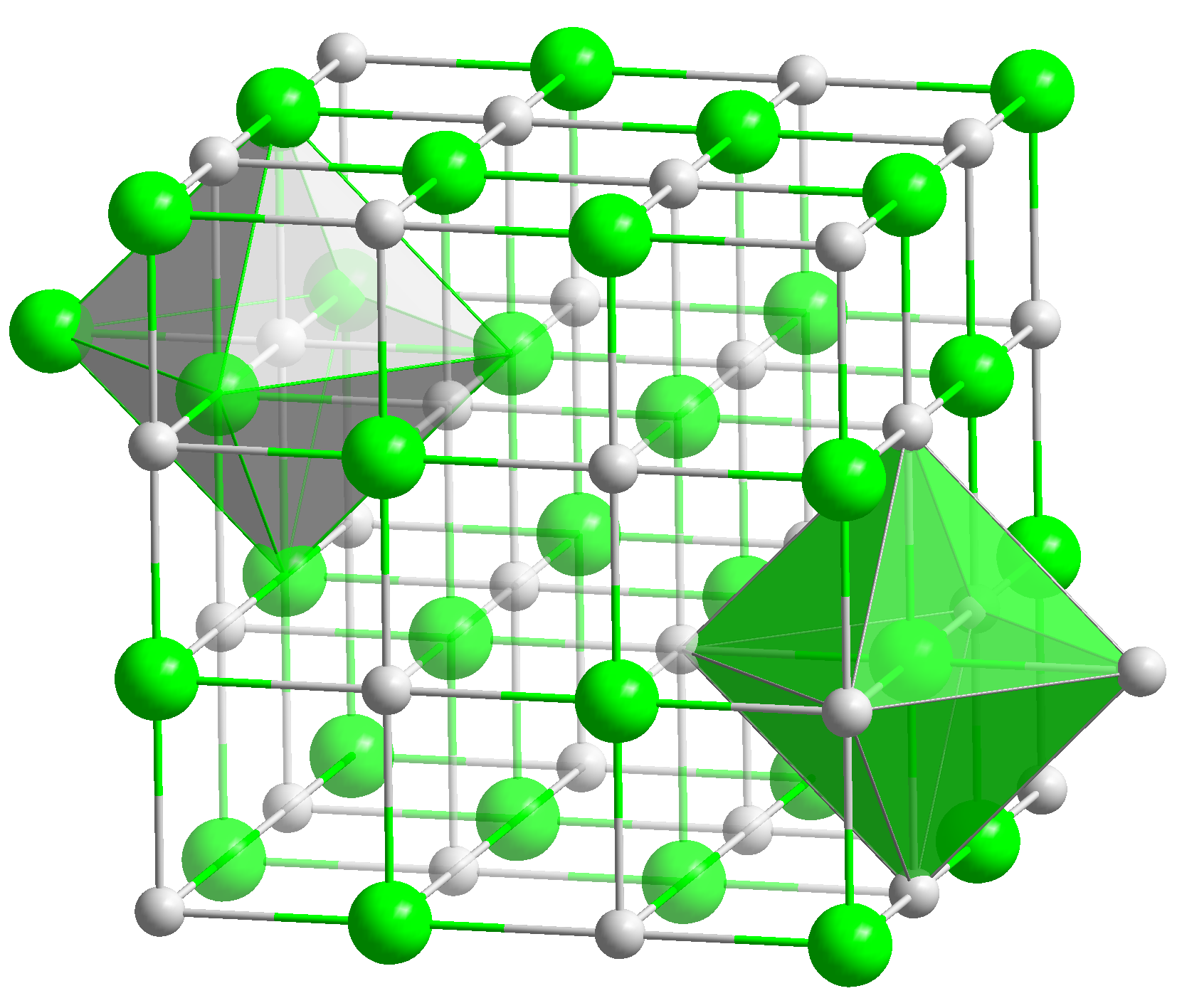

Names
- Other names Dysprosium monoantimonide

Identifiers
3D model (JSmol)	Interactive image
ChemSpider	20137701
EC Number	234-651-9
PubChem CID	20835926
- InChI: InChI=1S/Dy.Sb Key: LORQYBGBGJXRFG-UHFFFAOYSA-N
- SMILES: [Dy].[Sb]

Properties
Chemical formula	DySb
Molar mass	284.260 g·mol^{−1}
Appearance	powder
Density	8.104 g/cm^{3}

Related compounds
Other anions	Dysprosium nitride Dysprosium phosphide Dysprosium arsenide Dysprosium bismuthide
Other cations	Terbium phosphide Holmium phosphide
- Except where otherwise noted, data are given for materials in their standard state (at 25 °C [77 °F], 100 kPa). Infobox references

Dysprosium antimonide is a binary inorganic compound of dysprosium and antimony with the chemical formula DySb.

== Physical properties ==
The compound is rock-salt structured, crystallizing in the cubic Fm3̅m space group.
