= Holmium acetate =

Compound of holmium

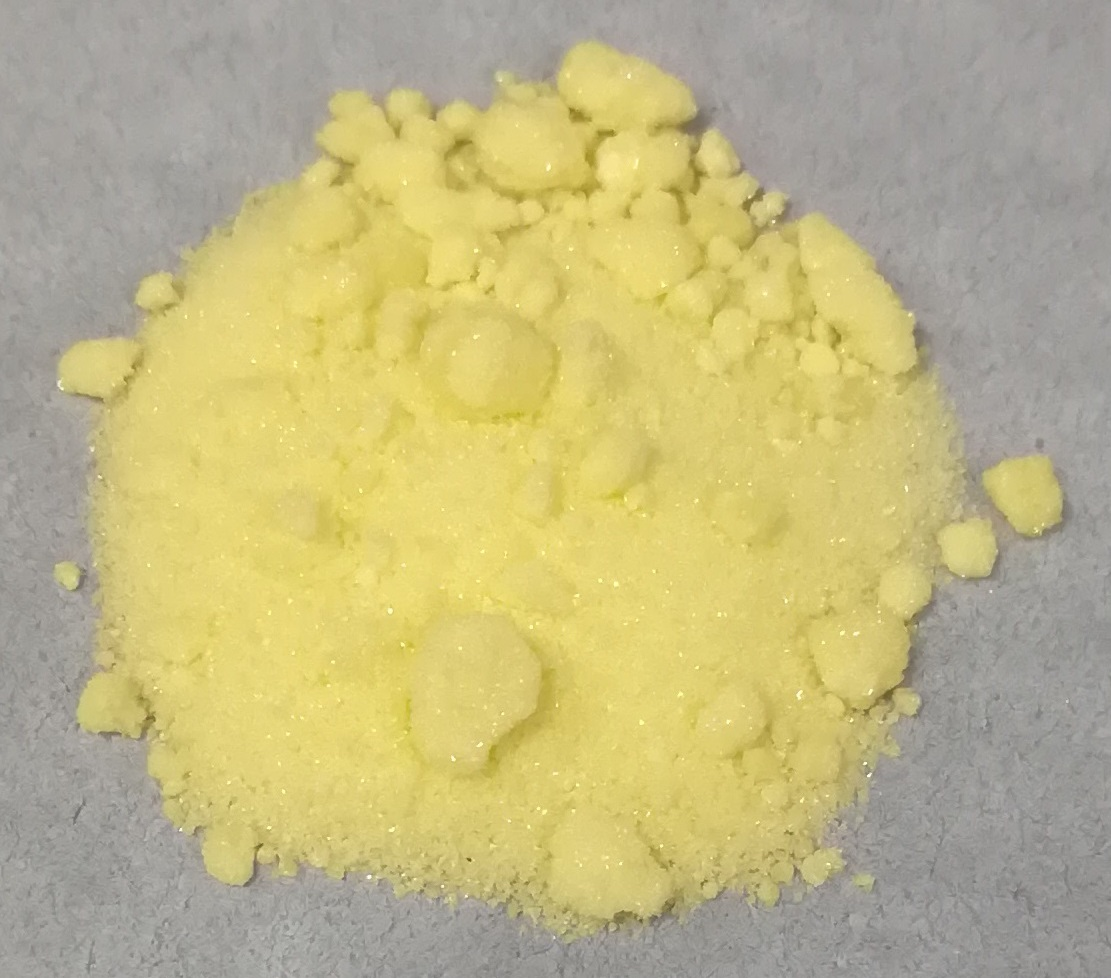

Names
- Other names Holmium(III) acetate

Identifiers
| CAS Number | 25519-09-9 anhydrous |
| 3D model (JSmol) | Interactive image |
| ChemSpider | 147291 |
| ECHA InfoCard | 100.042.773 |
| EC Number | 247-066-9 |
| PubChem CID | 168384 |
| CompTox Dashboard (EPA) | DTXSID00890802 |
- InChI: InChI=1S/3C2H4O2.Ho/c3*1-2(3)4;/h3*1H3,(H,3,4);/q;;;+3/p-3 Key: HWQRVFRWLQGBFV-UHFFFAOYSA-K
- SMILES: CC(=O)[O-].CC(=O)[O-].CC(=O)[O-].[Ho+3]

Properties
| Chemical formula | Ho(CH_{3}COO)_{3} |
| Appearance | crystals |
| Solubility in water | soluble |

Related compounds
| Other anions | Holmium oxide Holmium hydroxide |
| Other cations | Dysprosium acetate Erbium acetate |
- Except where otherwise noted, data are given for materials in their standard state (at 25 °C [77 °F], 100 kPa). Infobox references

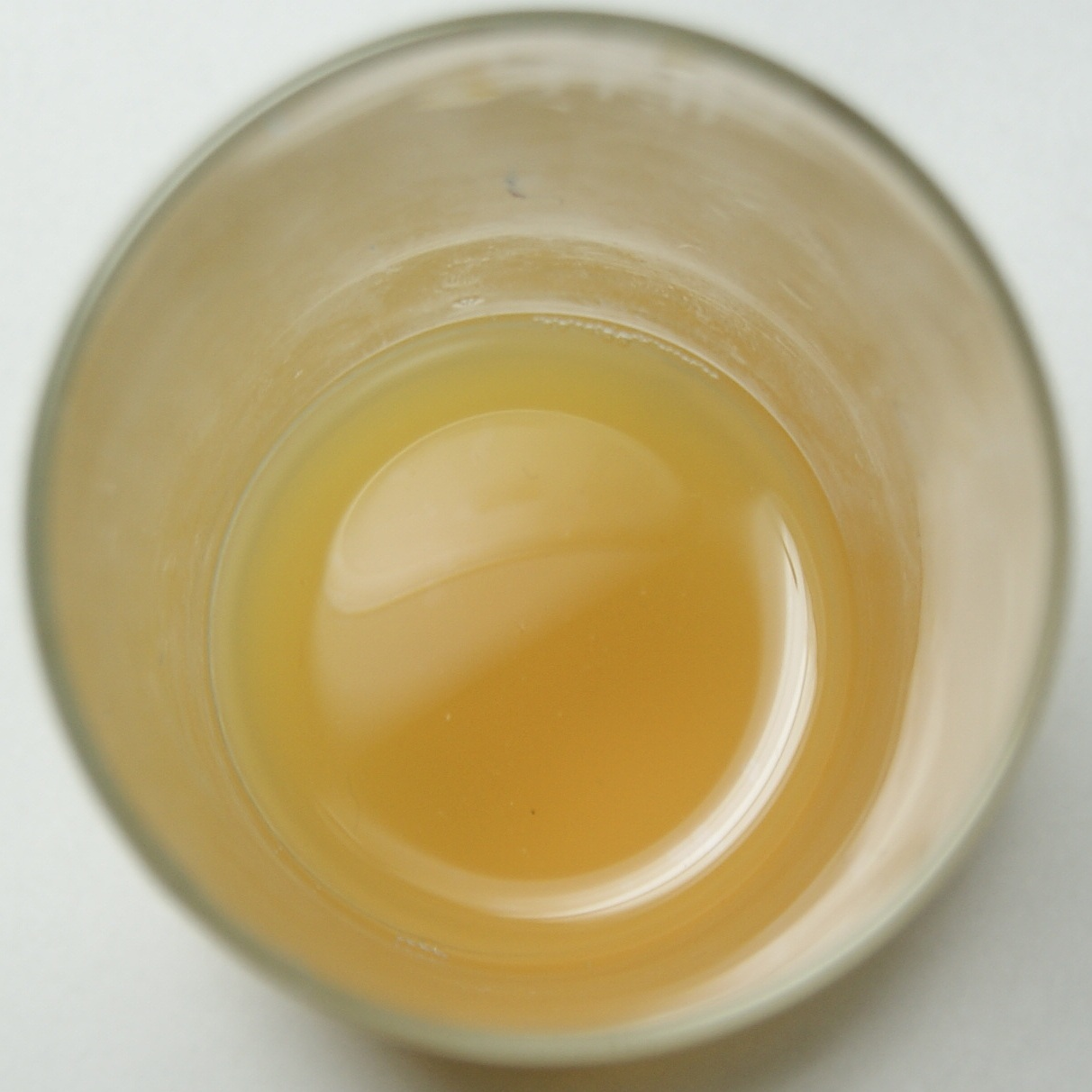
Holmium in acetic acid

Holmium acetate is the acetate salt of holmium, with a chemical formula of Ho(CH_{3}COO)_{3} as well as at least one hydrate.

== Preparation ==
Holmium acetate can be obtained by dissolving holmium oxide in hot acetic acid

Ho_{2}O_{3} + 6 CH_{3}CO_{2}H → 2 Ho(O_{2}CH_{3})_{3} + 3 H_{2}O

Dissolving holmium oxide in acetic acid at a pH of 4 will form the tetrahydrate of holmium acetate (Ho_{2}(CH_{3}COO)_{6}·4H_{2}O): The anhydrous material can be obtained by heating the hydrated acetate in acetic acid.

== Physical properties and structure ==
Holmium acetate hemihepthydate decomposes at 105 °C, forming into a hemihydrate, further decomposing at 135 °C into an anhydride. Further adding heat will form Ho(OH)(CH_{3}COO)_{2}, HoO(CH_{3}COO) then Ho_{2}O_{2}CO_{3}, forming holmium oxide at 590 °C.

According to X-ray crystallography, anhydrous holmium acetate is a coordination polymer. Each Ho(III) center is nine-coordinate, with two bidentate acetate ligands and the remaining sites occupied by oxygens provided by bridging acetate ligands. The lanthanum and praseodymium compounds are isostructural. In a second polymorph, holmium acetate has 8-coordination. A tetrahydrate has also been crystallized.

== Applications ==
Holmium acetate is used in the manufacture of ceramics, glass, phosphors, metal halide lamps, and as a dopant in garnet lasers. It is also used in nuclear reactors to keep the chain reaction in check.

== External reading ==
- R. S. Kolat, J. E. Powell (1962-05-01). "Acetate Complexes of the Rare Earth and Several Transition Metal Ions". Inorganic Chemistry. 1 (2): 293–296. doi:10.1021/ic50002a019. ISSN 0020-1669.
