= Holmium(III) fluoride =

Identifiers
CAS Number	13760-78-6
3D model (JSmol)	Interactive image
ChemSpider	75531
ECHA InfoCard	100.033.942
EC Number	237-352-1
PubChem CID	83709
UNII	XU9F7TR3LU
CompTox Dashboard (EPA)	DTXSID3065611
- InChI: InChI=1S/3FH.Ho/h3*1H;/q;;;+3/p-3 Key: FDIFPFNHNADKFC-UHFFFAOYSA-K
- SMILES: F[Ho](F)F

Properties
Chemical formula	HoF_{3}
Molar mass	221.93
Appearance	yellowish powder
Density	7.64g/cm^{3}
Melting point	1145 °C
Boiling point	>2200 °C

Hazards
- GHS labelling
Pictograms	(GHS06: Toxic) (GHS07: Exclamation mark)
Signal word	Danger
Hazard statements	H301, H311, H315, H319, H331, H335
Precautionary statements	P261, P264, P270, P271, P280, P301+P310, P302+P352, P304+P340, P305+P351+P338, P311, P312, P321, P322, P330, P332+P313, P337+P313, P361, P362, P363, P403+P233, P405, P501
- Except where otherwise noted, data are given for materials in their standard state (at 25 °C [77 °F], 100 kPa). Infobox references

Holmium(III) fluoride is an inorganic compound with a chemical formula of HoF_{3}.

== Preparation ==
Holmium(III) fluoride can be produced by reacting holmium oxide and ammonium fluoride, then crystallising it from the ammonium salt formed in solution:

Ho_{2}O_{3} + 6NH_{4}F ⟶ 2HoF_{3} + 6NH_{3} + 2H_{2}O

It can also be prepared by directly reacting holmium with fluorine:

2Ho + 3F_{2} → 2HoF_{3}

== Properties ==
Holmium(III) fluoride is a yellowish powder that is insoluble in water. It has an orthorhombic crystal system (corresponding to β-YF_{3}) with the space group Pnma (space group no. 62). However, there is also a trigonal low-temperature form of the lanthanum(III) fluoride type.
