= Holmium(III) nitrate =

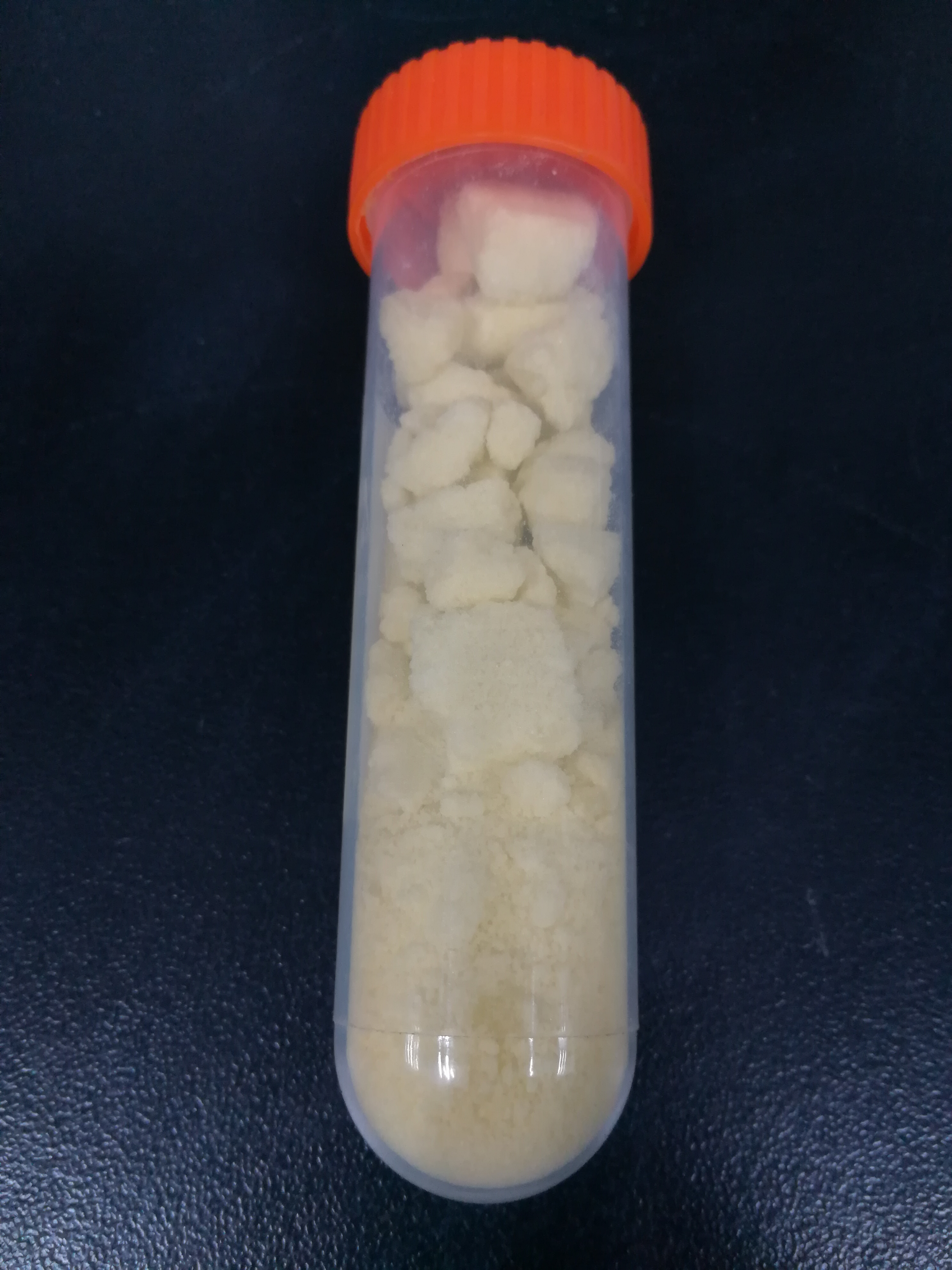

Names
- Other names Holmium trinitrate, Holmium nitrate

Identifiers
CAS Number	anhydrous: 10168-82-8; pentahydrate: 14483-18-2; hexahydrate: 35725-31-6
3D model (JSmol)	Interactive image; pentahydrate: Interactive image; hexahydrate: Interactive image
ChemSpider	anhydrous: 26948008; pentahydrate: 21241428; hexahydrate: 34196
ECHA InfoCard	100.030.386
EC Number	233-438-8
PubChem CID	pentahydrate: 25021754; hexahydrate: 37257
CompTox Dashboard (EPA)	DTXSID40890649; pentahydrate: DTXSID80648469; hexahydrate: DTXSID10189254
- InChI: InChI=1S/Ho.3NO3/c;3*2-1(3)4/q+3;3*-1 Key: WDVGLADRSBQDDY-UHFFFAOYSA-N; pentahydrate: InChI=1S/Ho.3NO3.5H2O/c;3*2-1(3)4;;;;;/h;;;;5*1H2/q+3;3*-1;;;;; Key: BJUGWWDCFYEYOA-UHFFFAOYSA-N; hexahydrate: InChI=1S/Ho.3NO3.6H2O/c;3*2-1(3)4;;;;;;/h;;;;6*1H2/q+3;3*-1;;;;;; Key: OMTYKYWUMGRKES-UHFFFAOYSA-N
- SMILES: [N+](=O)([O-])[O-].[N+](=O)([O-])[O-].[N+](=O)([O-])[O-].[Ho+3]; pentahydrate: [N+](=O)([O-])[O-].[N+](=O)([O-])[O-].[N+](=O)([O-])[O-].O.O.O.O.O.[Ho+3]; hexahydrate: [N+](=O)([O-])[O-].[N+](=O)([O-])[O-].[N+](=O)([O-])[O-].O.O.O.O.O.O.[Ho+3]

Properties
Chemical formula	Ho(NO_{3})_{3}
Molar mass	350,95
Appearance	Yellowish crystals
Melting point	754 °C (1,389 °F; 1,027 K)
Solubility in water	Soluble

Hazards
- GHS labelling
Pictograms	(GHS03: Oxidizing) (GHS07: Exclamation mark)
Signal word	Warning
Hazard statements	H272, H315, H319, H335
Precautionary statements	P210, P220, P221, P261, P264, P271, P280, P302+P352, P304+P340, P305+P351+P338, P312, P321, P332+P313, P337+P313, P362, P370+P378, P403+P233, P405, P501

Related compounds
Related compounds	Terbium(III) nitrate
- Except where otherwise noted, data are given for materials in their standard state (at 25 °C [77 °F], 100 kPa). Infobox references

Holmium (III) nitrate is an inorganic compound, a salt of holmium and nitric acid with the chemical formula Ho(NO_{3})_{3}. The compound forms yellowish crystals, dissolves in water, also forms crystalline hydrates.

== Synthesis ==
Anhydrous salt is obtained by the action of nitrogen dioxide on holmium(III) oxide:

$$\mathsf{2Ho_2O_3 + 9N_2O_4 \ \xrightarrow{150^oC}\ 4Ho(NO_3)_3 + 6NO }$$

Effect of nitrogen dioxide on metallic holmium:

$$\mathsf{Ho + 3N_2O_4 \ \xrightarrow{200^oC}\ Ho(NO_3)_3 + 3NO }$$

Reaction of holmium hydroxide and nitric acid:

$$\mathsf{Ho(OH)_3 + 3NHO_3 \ \xrightarrow{150^oC}\ Ho(NO_3)_3 + 3H_2O }$$

== Physical properties ==
Holmium(III) nitrate forms yellowish crystals.

Forms a crystalline hydrate of the composition Ho(NO_{3})_{3}•5H_{2}O.

Soluble in water and ethanol.

== Chemical properties ==
Hydrated holmitic nitrate thermally decomposes to form HoONO_{3} and decomposes to holmium oxide upon subsequent heating.

== Application ==
The compound is used for the production of ceramics and glass.

Also used to produce metallic holmium and as a chemical reagent.
