= Holmium(III) sulfide =

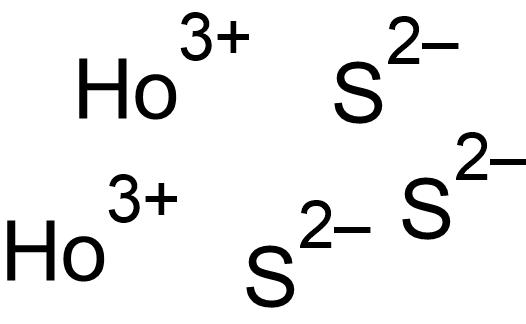

Identifiers
CAS Number	12162-59-3
3D model (JSmol)	Interactive image
ChemSpider	145818
ECHA InfoCard	100.032.081
EC Number	235-302-3
PubChem CID	166640
CompTox Dashboard (EPA)	DTXSID10923892
- InChI: InChI=1S/2Ho.3S/q2*+3;3*-2 Key: NJMYJOBJCDACOG-UHFFFAOYSA-N
- SMILES: [Ho+3].[Ho+3].[S-2].[S-2].[S-2]

Properties
Chemical formula	Ho_{2}S_{3}
Molar mass	426.04 g·mol^{−1}
Appearance	orange-yellow solid
Density	5.92 g/cm^{−3}

Related compounds
Other anions	holmium(III) oxide; holmium(III) selenide
Other cations	dysprosium(III) sulfide erbium(III) sulfide
- Except where otherwise noted, data are given for materials in their standard state (at 25 °C [77 °F], 100 kPa). Infobox references

Holmium(III) sulfide is the sulfide salt of holmium, with the chemical formula of Ho_{2}S_{3}.

== Preparation ==
Holmium(III) sulfide can be obtained by the reaction of holmium(III) oxide and hydrogen sulfide at 1325 °C.

Ho_{2}O_{3} + 3 H_{2}S → Ho_{2}S_{3} + 3 H_{2}O

It can also be prepared by treating holmium(III) sulfate with hydrogen sulfide at elevated temperatures.

In another preparation, it can be produced by treating metallic holmium with sulfur:

2Ho + 3S → Ho_{2}S_{3}

Once prepared, holmium(III) sulfide can be purified by chemical vapor transport using iodine.

== Properties ==
Holmium(III) sulfide has orange-yellow crystals in the monoclinic crystal system, with the space group P2_{1}/m (No. 11). Under high pressure, holmium(III) sulfide can form in the cubic and orthorhombic crystal systems.
