= Holmium(III) selenide =

Identifiers
CAS Number	12162-60-6
3D model (JSmol)	Interactive image
ChemSpider	145819
EC Number	235-303-9
PubChem CID	166641
- InChI: InChI=1S/2Ho.3Se/q2*+3;3*-2 Key: XDJRCWPMKKSKGI-UHFFFAOYSA-N
- SMILES: [Se-2].[Se-2].[Se-2].[Ho+3].[Ho+3]

Properties
Chemical formula	Ho_{2}Se_{3}
Molar mass	566.774 g·mol^{−1}
Appearance	brown
- Except where otherwise noted, data are given for materials in their standard state (at 25 °C [77 °F], 100 kPa). Infobox references

Holmium(III) selenide is an inorganic compound with the chemical formula Ho_{2}Se_{3}.

== Preparation ==
Holmium(III) selenide can be obtained from the reaction of holmium and selenium (in the presence of iodine):

2 Ho + 3 Se → Ho_{2}Se_{3}

It can also be prepared by reacting holmium oxide and hydrogen selenide at high temperature.

Ho_{2}O_{3} + 3 H_{2}Se → Ho_{2}Se_{3} + 3 H_{2}O

== Properties ==
Holmium(III) selenide can form orthorhombic AgHoSe_{2} in the binary system of silver selenide.
