= Holmium(III) iodide =

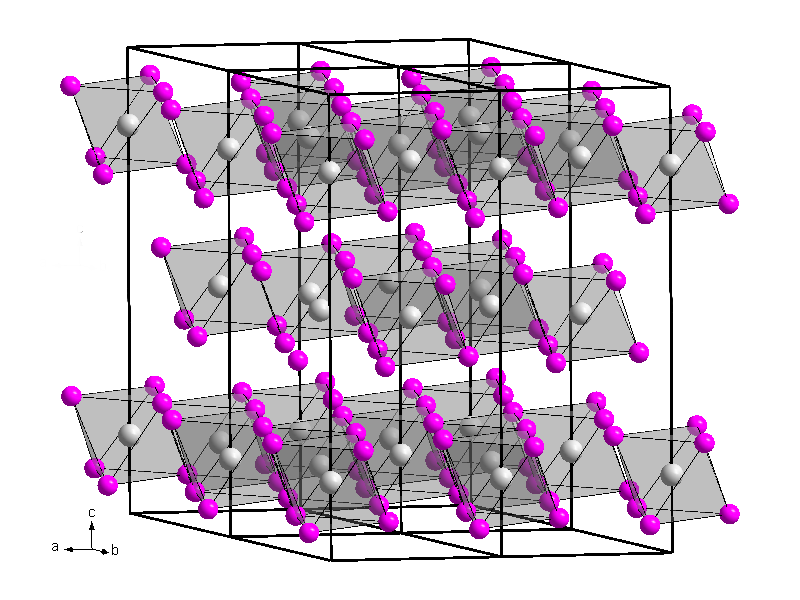

Names
- Other names Holmium iodide Holmium triiodide

Identifiers
CAS Number	13813-41-7
3D model (JSmol)	Interactive image
ChemSpider	75570
ECHA InfoCard	100.034.050
EC Number	237-470-3
PubChem CID	83748
UNII	F83S1HBF6W
CompTox Dashboard (EPA)	DTXSID5065645
- InChI: InChI=1S/Ho.3HI/h;3*1H/q+3;;;/p-3 Key: KXCRAPCRWWGWIW-UHFFFAOYSA-K
- SMILES: [Ho+3].[I-].[I-].[I-]

Properties
Chemical formula	HoI_{3}
Molar mass	545.6437 g/mol
Appearance	Pale-yellow solid
Density	5.4 g/cm^{3}
Melting point	994 °C
Boiling point	1300 °C
Solubility in water	soluble in water

Hazards
- GHS labelling
Pictograms	(GHS07: Exclamation mark) (GHS08: Health hazard)
Signal word	Danger
Hazard statements	H315, H319, H335, H360
Precautionary statements	P203, P233, P260, P264, P264+P265, P271, P272, P280, P284, P302+P352, P304+P340, P305+P351+P338, P318, P319, P321, P333+P317, P337+P317, P342+P316, P362+P364, P403, P403+P233, P405, P501
- Except where otherwise noted, data are given for materials in their standard state (at 25 °C [77 °F], 100 kPa). Infobox references

Holmium(III) iodide is an iodide of holmium, with the chemical formula of HoI_{3}. It is used as a component of metal halide lamps.

== Preparation ==
Holmium(III) iodide can be obtained by directly reacting holmium and iodine:

2 Ho + 3 I_{2} → 2 HoI_{3}

Holmium(III) iodide can also be obtained via the direct reaction between holmium and mercury(II) iodide:

2 Ho + 3 HgI_{2} → 2 HoI_{3} + 3 Hg

The mercury produced in the reaction can be removed by distillation.

Holmium(III) iodide hydrate can be converted to the anhydrous form by dehydration with a large excess of ammonium iodide (since the compound is prone to hydrolysis).

== Properties ==
Holmium(III) iodide is a highly hygroscopic substance that dissolves in water. It forms yellow hexagonal crystals with a crystal structure similar to bismuth(III) iodide. In air, it quickly absorbs moisture and forms hydrates. The corresponding oxide iodide is also readily formed at elevated temperature.
