= Erbium(III) acetate =

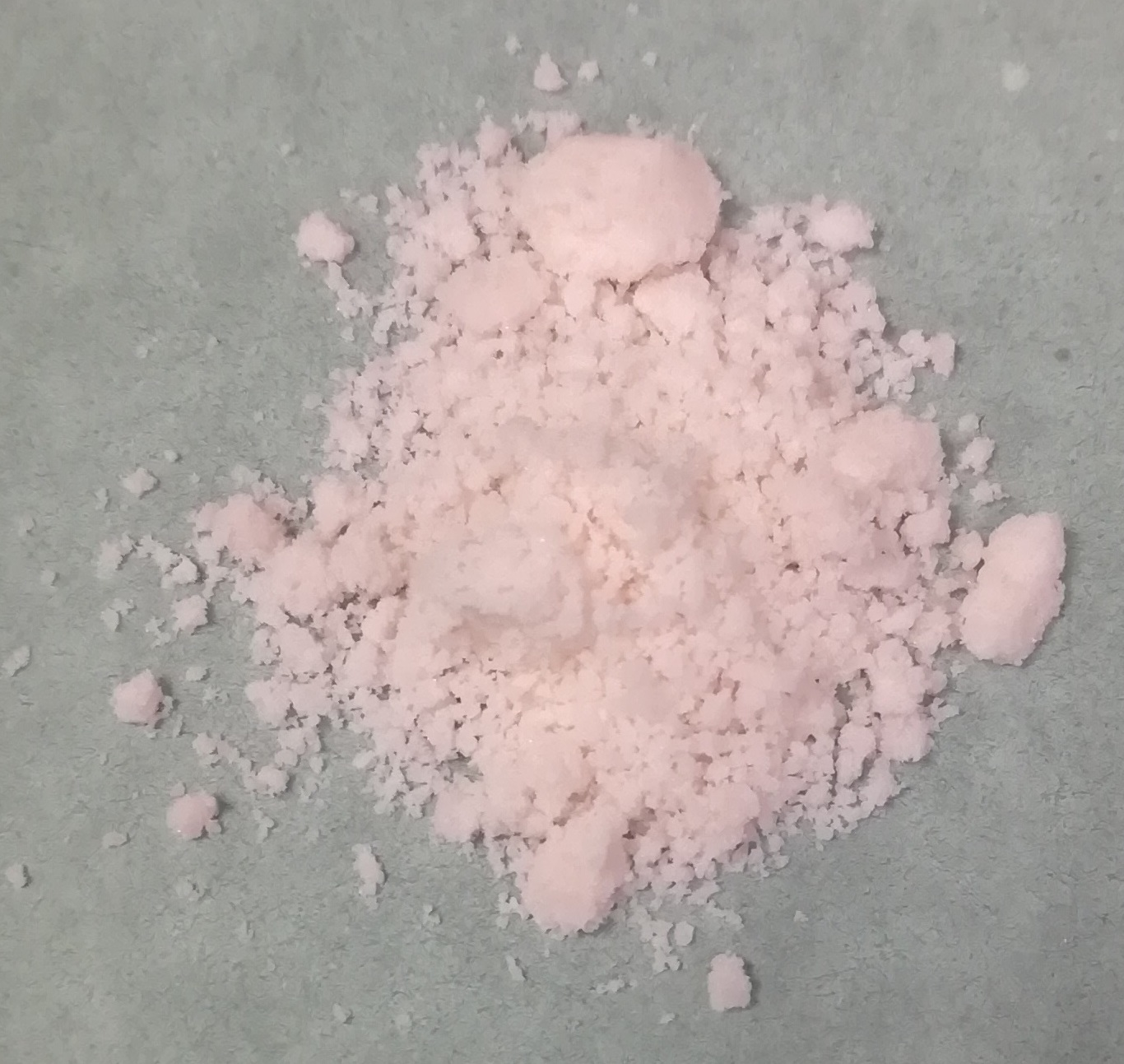

Names
- Other names Erbium acetate Erbium triacetate

Identifiers
CAS Number	25519-10-2
3D model (JSmol)	Interactive image
ChemSpider	147292
ECHA InfoCard	100.042.774
EC Number	247-067-4
PubChem CID	168385
CompTox Dashboard (EPA)	DTXSID60890803
- InChI: InChI=1S/3C2H4O2.Er/c3*1-2(3)4;/h3*1H3,(H,3,4);/q;;;+3/p-3 Key: DBUHPIKTDUMWTR-UHFFFAOYSA-K
- SMILES: CC(=O)[O-].CC(=O)[O-].CC(=O)[O-].[Er+3]

Properties
Chemical formula	Er(CH_{3}COO)_{3}
Appearance	light pink solid
Solubility in water	soluble

Hazards
- GHS labelling
Pictograms	(GHS07: Exclamation mark)
Signal word	Warning
Hazard statements	H315, H319, H335
Precautionary statements	P261, P264, P264+P265, P271, P280, P302+P352, P304+P340, P305+P351+P338, P319, P321, P332+P317, P337+P317, P362+P364, P403+P233, P405, P501

Related compounds
Other cations	Holmium(III) acetate Thulium(III) acetate
Related compounds	Erbium oxide
- Except where otherwise noted, data are given for materials in their standard state (at 25 °C [77 °F], 100 kPa). Infobox references

Erbium(III) acetate is the acetate salt of erbium, with the proposed chemical formula of Er(CH_{3}COO)_{3}. It can be used to synthesize some optical materials.

== Physical properties ==
The tetrahydrate of erbium(III) acetate is thermally decomposed at 90 °C, giving a proposed anhydride:

Er(CH_{3}COO)_{3}·4H_{2}O → Er(CH_{3}COO)_{3} + 4 H_{2}O

Continued heating to 310 °C will form ketene:

Er(CH_{3}COO)_{3} → Er(OH)(CH_{3}COO)_{2} + CH_{2}=C=O

At 350 °C, the proposed Er(OH)(CH_{3}COO)_{2} loses acetic acid to yield a material of the formula ErOCH_{3}COO, forming Er_{2}O_{2}CO_{3} at 390 °C, finally obtaining Er_{2}O_{3} at 590 °C.
