= Holmium phosphide =

Names
- Other names Phosphanylidyneholmium, holmium monophosphide

Identifiers
CAS Number	12029-85-5
3D model (JSmol)	Interactive image
ChemSpider	38073060
ECHA InfoCard	100.031.566
EC Number	234-737-6
PubChem CID	82819
- InChI: InChI=1S/Ho.P Key: MPCFEQUPROVEQK-UHFFFAOYSA-N
- SMILES: P#[Ho]

Properties
Chemical formula	HoP
Molar mass	195.90
Appearance	Dark crystals
Density	7.90 g/cm^{3}
Solubility in water	Insoluble

Related compounds
Other anions	Holmium nitride Holmium arsenide Holmium antimonide Holmium bismuthide
Other cations	Dysprosium phosphide Erbium phosphide
- Except where otherwise noted, data are given for materials in their standard state (at 25 °C [77 °F], 100 kPa). Infobox references

Holmium phosphide is a binary inorganic compound of holmium and phosphorus with the chemical formula HoP. The compound forms dark crystals, is stable in air, and does not dissolve in water.

== Synthesis ==
Heating powdered holmium and red phosphorus in an inert atmosphere or vacuum:

4Ho + P_{4} → 4HoP

== Properties ==
HoP belongs to the large class of NaCl-structured rare earth monopnictides.

Ferromagnetic at low temperatures.

HoP actively reacts with nitric acid.

== Uses ==
The compound is a semiconductor used in high power, high frequency applications and in laser diodes.
