= Holmium(III) chloride =

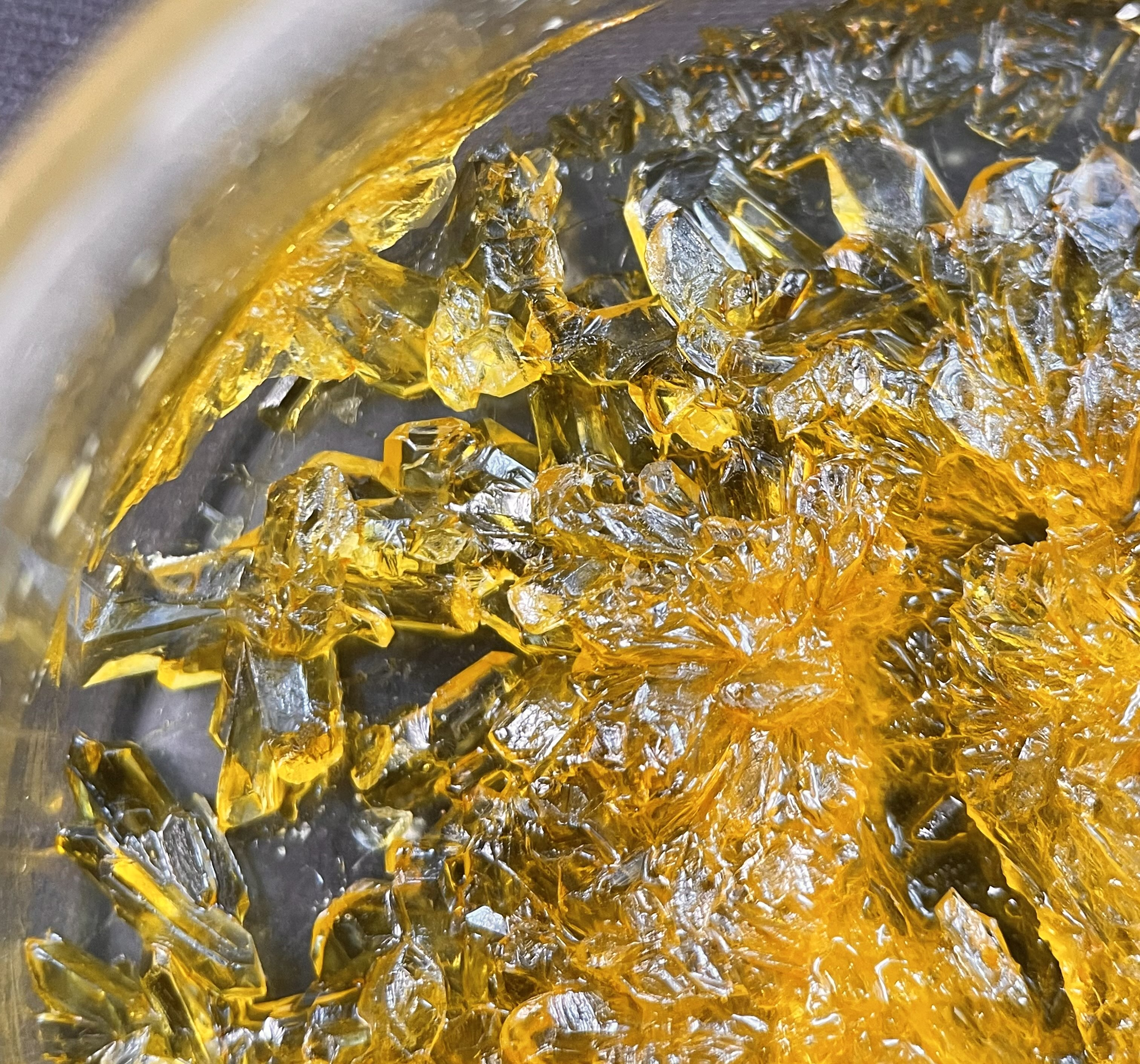
- Hexahydrate

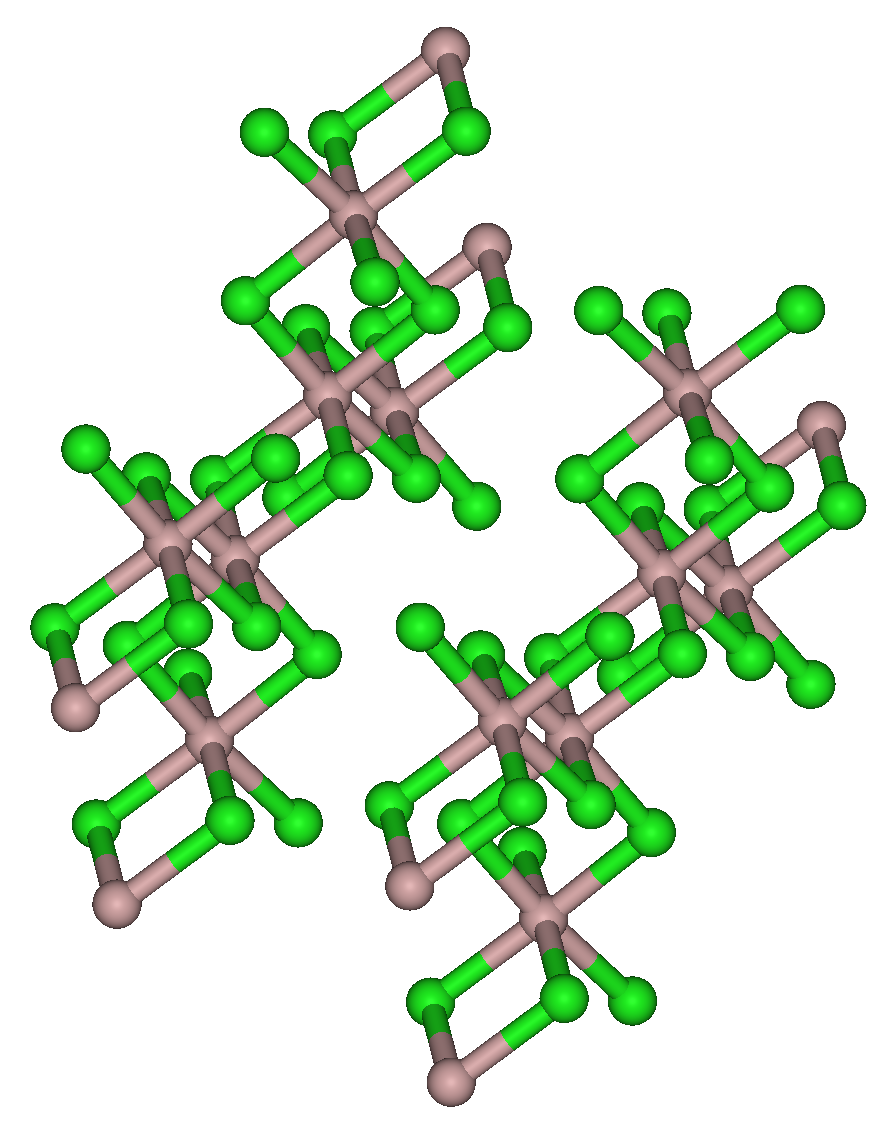

Names
- Other names Holmium trichloride Holmiumchlorid

Identifiers
CAS Number	10138-62-2; 14914-84-2 (hexahydrate)
3D model (JSmol)	Interactive image
ChemSpider	23362
ECHA InfoCard	100.030.339
EC Number	233-387-1
PubChem CID	24992
UNII	CAR334HOLD
CompTox Dashboard (EPA)	DTXSID0064967
- InChI: InChI=1S/3ClH.Ho/h3*1H;/q;;;+3/p-3 Key: PYOOBRULIYNHJR-UHFFFAOYSA-K
- SMILES: Cl[Ho](Cl)Cl

Properties
Chemical formula	HoCl_{3}
Molar mass	271.289 g/mol
Appearance	yellow crystals hygroscopic
Density	3.7 g/cm^{3}
Melting point	720 °C (1,328 °F; 993 K)
Boiling point	1,500 °C (2,730 °F; 1,770 K) (decomposes)
Solubility in water	dissolves

Structure
Crystal structure	Monoclinic, mS16
Space group	C12/m1, No. 12

Related compounds
Other anions	Holmium(III) oxide
Other cations	Dysprosium(III) chloride, Erbium(III) chloride
- Except where otherwise noted, data are given for materials in their standard state (at 25 °C [77 °F], 100 kPa). verify (what is ?) Infobox references

Holmium(III) chloride is the inorganic compound with the formula HoCl_{3}. It is a common salt but is mainly used in research. It can be used to produce pure holmium. It exhibits the same color-changing behavior seen in holmium oxide, being a yellow in natural lighting and a bright pink color in fluorescent lighting.

== Preparation ==
The most commonly used method to obtain holmium(III) chloride involves heating a mixture of holmium(III) oxide and ammonium chloride at 200-250 °C:

Ho_{2}O_{3} + 6 NH_{4}Cl → 2 HoCl_{3} + 6 NH_{3} + 2 H_{2}O

The hexahydrate of holmium(III) chloride can be obtained by reaction between holmium and hydrochloric acid:

2 Ho + 6 HCl → 2 HoCl_{3} + 3 H_{2}

It can also be prepared by the direct reaction between holmium and chlorine:

2 Ho + 3 Cl_{2} → 2 HoCl_{3}

== Properties ==
Holmium(III) chloride and its hexahydrate are light yellow solids in daylight that are soluble in water. The hexahydrate starts to release water of crystallization at 64 °C. Holmium(III) chloride has a monoclinic crystal structure analogous to that of aluminum(III) chloride. In the solid state it has the YCl_{3} layer structure.
