= Dysprosium phosphide =

Dysprosium compound

Names
- Other names Dysprosium monophosphide, phosphanylidynedysprosium

Identifiers
CAS Number	12019-91-9
3D model (JSmol)	Interactive image
ChemSpider	74724
EC Number	234-650-3
PubChem CID	82804
CompTox Dashboard (EPA)	DTXSID701311047
- InChI: InChI=1S/Dy.P Key: NAUXLTDHJZDBHT-UHFFFAOYSA-N
- SMILES: P#[Dy]

Properties
Chemical formula	DyP
Molar mass	193.474
Appearance	Crystals
Density	7.06 g/cm^{3}

Structure
Crystal structure	Cubic

Hazards
- GHS labelling
Pictograms	(GHS07: Exclamation mark)
Signal word	Warning
Hazard statements	H315, H319, H335
Precautionary statements	P261, P280, P304, P305, P338, P340, P351, P405, P501

Related compounds
Other anions	Dysprosium nitride Dysprosium arsenide Dysprosium antimonide Dysprosium bismuthide
Other cations	Terbium phosphide Holmium phosphide
- Except where otherwise noted, data are given for materials in their standard state (at 25 °C [77 °F], 100 kPa). Infobox references

Dysprosium phosphide is an inorganic compound of dysprosium and phosphorus with the chemical formula DyP.

== Synthesis ==
The compound can be obtained by the reaction of phosphorus and dysprosium at high temperature.

4 Dy + P_{4} → 4 DyP

== Physical properties ==
DyP has a NaCl structure (a=5.653 Å), where dysprosium is +3 valence. Its band gap is 1.15 eV, and the Hall mobility (μH) is 8.5 cm^{3}/V·s.

DyP forms crystals of a cubic system, space group Fm3m.

== Uses ==
The compound is a semiconductor used in high power, high frequency applications and in laser diode.
