= Holmium nitride =

Names
- Other names holmium mononitride, azanylidyneholmium

Identifiers
CAS Number	12029-81-1
3D model (JSmol)	Interactive image
ChemSpider	21241596
ECHA InfoCard	100.031.565
EC Number	234-736-0
PubChem CID	82818
CompTox Dashboard (EPA)	DTXSID401314878
- InChI: InChI=1S/Ho.N Key: YKIJUSDIPBWHAH-UHFFFAOYSA-N
- SMILES: [Ho]#N

Properties
Chemical formula	HoN
Molar mass	178.937 g·mol^{−1}
Density	10.6 g/cm^{3}
- Except where otherwise noted, data are given for materials in their standard state (at 25 °C [77 °F], 100 kPa). Infobox references

Holmium nitride is a binary inorganic compound of holmium and nitrogen with the chemical formula HoN.

== Synthesis ==
To produce holmium nitride nanoparticles, a plasma arc discharge technique can be employed.

In this process, holmium granules are placed in a copper crucible, which acts as the anode, while a tungsten cathode is used. Before starting, the furnace is evacuated, and this step is repeated twice to eliminate most of the air. Afterward, the furnace is filled with argon and nitrogen gas to a partial pressure of 4 kPa and a mixture ratio of 80% nitrogen to 20% argon.

Once the furnace is prepared, a current of ~220 A is applied along ~50 V, creating an arc plasma that generates holmium vapor. The holmium vapor then continues to react with the nitrogen gas in the surrounding environment, resulting in the formation of holmium nitride nanoparticles.

2 Ho (g) + N_{2} (g) → 2 HoN (s)

== Physical properties ==
The compound forms crystals of cubic system.
