= Dysprosium nitride =

Names
- Other names Dysprosium mononitride, azanylidynedysprosium

Identifiers
CAS Number	12019-88-4
3D model (JSmol)	Interactive image
ChemSpider	11551434
ECHA InfoCard	100.031.487
EC Number	234-649-8
PubChem CID	82803
CompTox Dashboard (EPA)	DTXSID40904270
- InChI: InChI=1S/Dy.N Key: IBIOTXDDKRNYMC-UHFFFAOYSA-N
- SMILES: [Dy]#N

Properties
Chemical formula	DyN
Molar mass	176.507 g·mol^{−1}
Appearance	solid
Density	9.93 g/cm^{3}
Solubility in water	reacts with water
- Except where otherwise noted, data are given for materials in their standard state (at 25 °C [77 °F], 100 kPa). Infobox references

Dypsrosium nitride is a binary inorganic compound of dysprosium and nitride with the chemical formula DyN.

== Preparation ==
Dysprosium can be prepared from the reaction of finely ground dysprosium, dysprosium hydride, or the dysprosium amalgam with nitrogen at 800–1000°C:

2Dy + N_{2} → 2DyN

The reaction is usually carried out under pressures higher than the atmospheric pressure. Studies have synthesised dysprosium nitride at pressures greater than 250 kPa.

== Physical properties ==
Dypsrosium nitride forms gray crystals of cubic system; cell parameter a = 0.490 nm, Z = 4. It is a good conductor of electricity and reacts with water. It is known for its magnetic properties and high melting point.
