= Holmium(III) oxide =

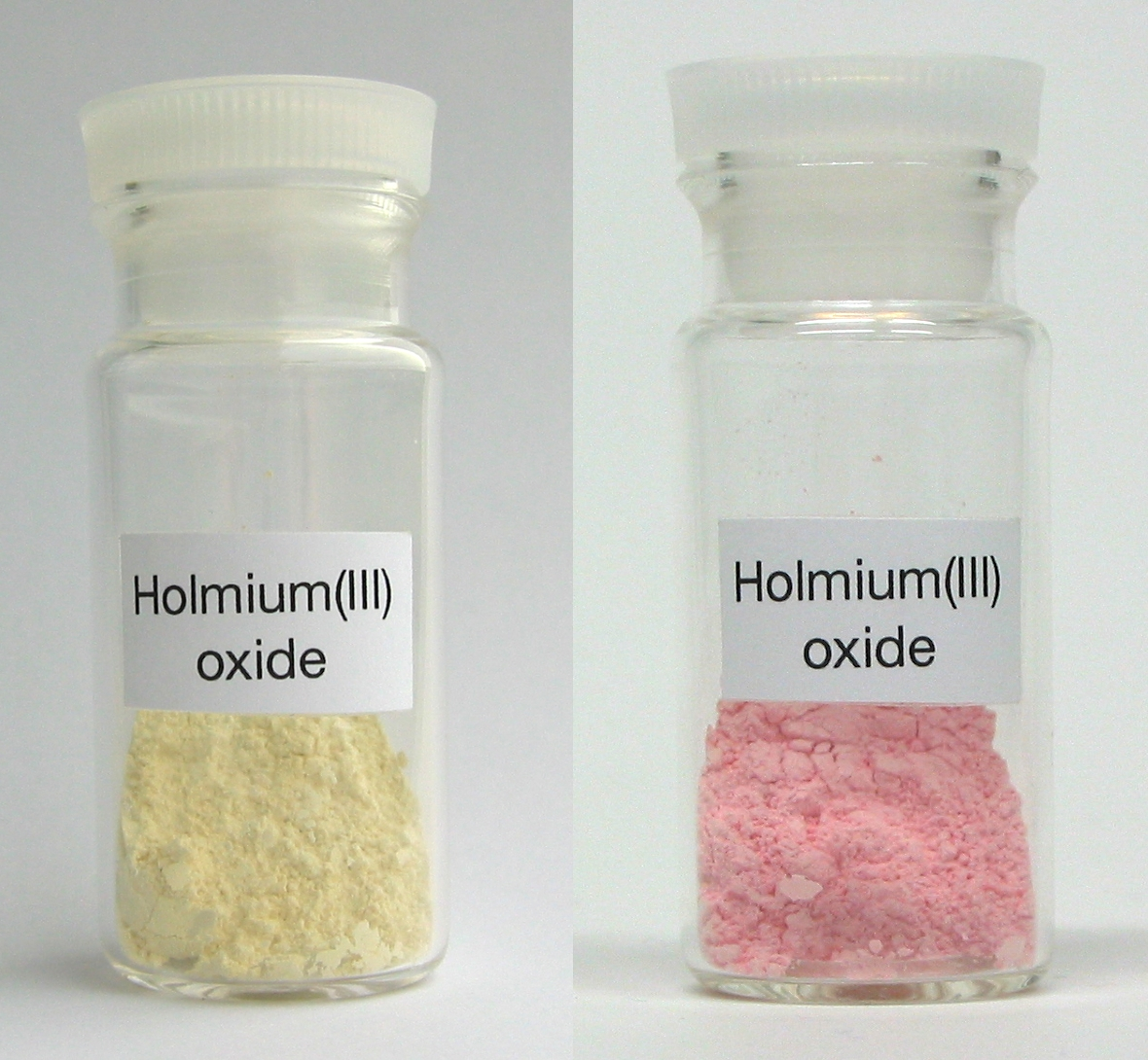
- Samples of holmium(III) oxide under ambient light, and trichromatic light

Names
- IUPAC name Holmium(III) oxide
- Other names: Holmium oxide; Holmia

Identifiers
CAS Number	12055-62-8
3D model (JSmol)	Interactive image
ChemSpider	3441223
ECHA InfoCard	100.031.820
EC Number	235-015-3
PubChem CID	4232365
UNII	6A1MAM6A4J
CompTox Dashboard (EPA)	DTXSID30894772
- InChI: InChI=1S/2Ho.3O Key: JYTUFVYWTIKZGR-UHFFFAOYSA-N; InChI=1/2Ho.3O/rHo2O3/c3-1-5-2-4 Key: JYTUFVYWTIKZGR-VLHOCPAZAL
- SMILES: O=[Ho]O[Ho]=O

Properties
Chemical formula	Ho_{2}O_{3}
Molar mass	377.858 g·mol^{−1}
Appearance	Pale yellow, opaque powder
Density	8.41 g cm^{−3}
Melting point	2,415 °C (4,379 °F; 2,688 K)
Boiling point	3,900 °C (7,050 °F; 4,170 K)
Band gap	5.3 eV
Magnetic susceptibility (χ)	+88,100·10^{−6} cm^{3}/mol
Refractive index (n_{D})	1.8

Structure
Crystal structure	Cubic, cI80
Space group	Ia-3, No. 206

Thermochemistry
Heat capacity (C)	115.0 J mol^{−1} K^{−1}
Std molar entropy (S^{⦵}_{298})	158.2 J mol^{−1} K^{−1}
Std enthalpy of formation (Δ_{f}H^{⦵}_{298})	−1880.7 kJ mol^{−1}

Hazards
- GHS labelling
Pictograms	(GHS07: Exclamation mark) (GHS09: Environmental hazard)
Signal word	Warning
Hazard statements	H319, H410
Precautionary statements	P264, P273, P280, P305+P351+P338, P337+P313, P391, P501
Safety data sheet (SDS)	External MSDS

Related compounds
Other anions	Holmium(III) chloride
Other cations	Dysprosium(III) oxide; Erbium(III) oxide
Related compounds	Bismuth(III) oxide; Europium(III) oxide; Gold(III) oxide; Lanthanum(III) oxide; Lutetium(III) oxide; Praseodymium(III) oxide; Promethium(III) oxide; Terbium(III) oxide; Thallium(III) oxide; Thulium(III) oxide
- Except where otherwise noted, data are given for materials in their standard state (at 25 °C [77 °F], 100 kPa). verify (what is ?) Infobox references

Holmium(III) oxide, or holmium oxide is a chemical compound of the rare-earth element holmium and oxygen with the formula Ho_{2}O_{3}. Together with dysprosium(III) oxide (Dy_{2}O_{3}), holmium oxide is one of the most powerfully paramagnetic substances known. The oxide, also called holmia, occurs as a component of the related erbium oxide mineral called erbia. Typically, the oxides of the trivalent lanthanides coexist in nature, and separation of these components requires specialized methods. Holmium oxide is used in making specialty colored glasses. Glass containing holmium oxide and holmium oxide solutions have a series of sharp optical absorption peaks in the visible spectral range. They are therefore traditionally used as a convenient calibration standard for optical spectrophotometers.

== Properties ==
=== Appearance ===
Holmium oxide has some fairly dramatic color changes depending on the lighting conditions. In daylight, it is a tannish yellow color. Under trichromatic light, it is a fiery orange red, almost indistinguishable from the way erbium oxide looks under this same lighting. This is related to the sharp emission bands of the phosphors. Holmium oxide has a wide band gap of 5.3 eV and thus should appear colorless. The yellow color originates from abundant lattice defects (such as oxygen vacancies) and is related to internal transitions at the Ho^{3+} ions.

=== Crystalline structure ===
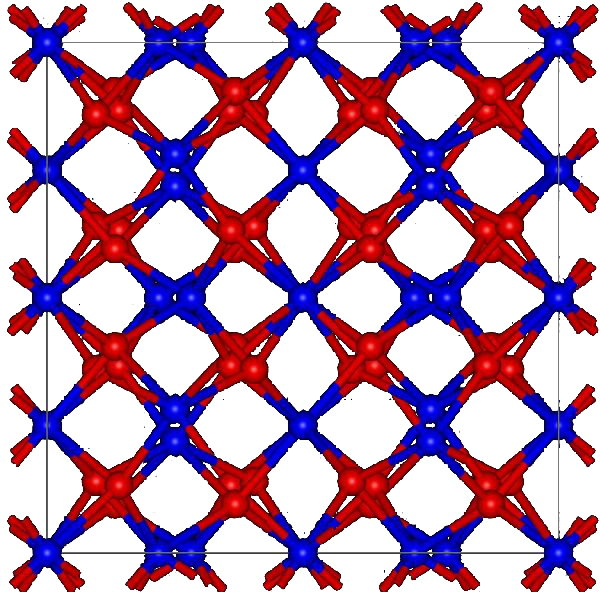
Room-temperature structure of Ho_{2}O_{3} viewed along a cubic axis. Red atoms are oxygens

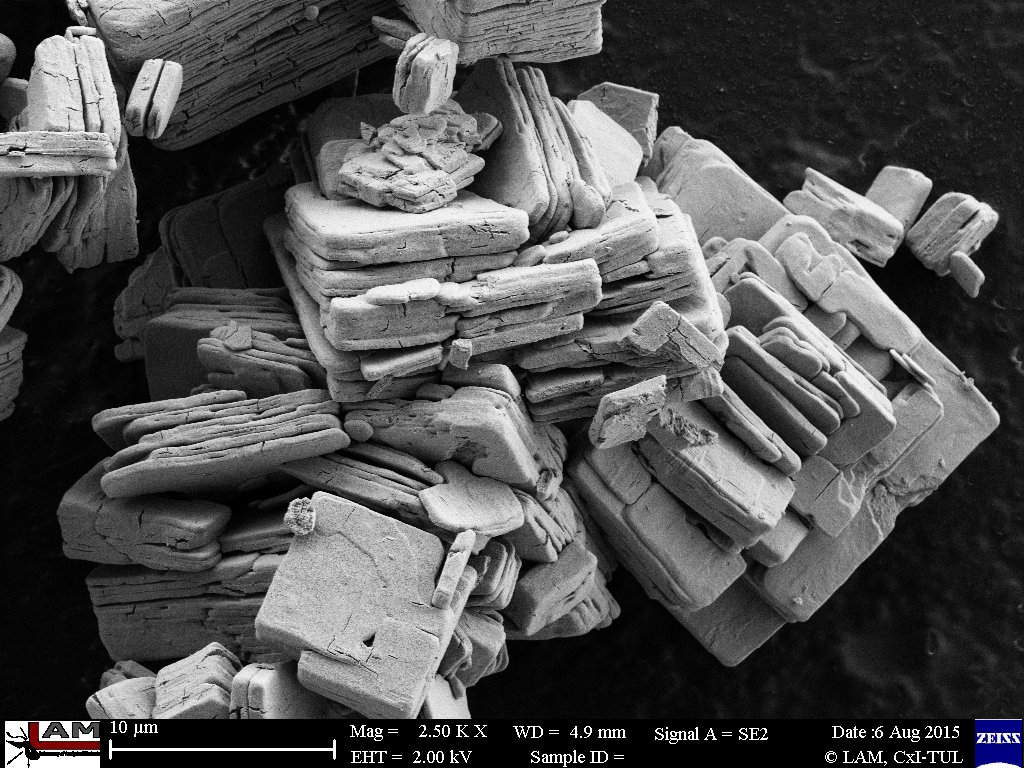
Electron micrograph of lamellar particles and aggregates of holmium oxide. Scale bar at bottom shows 10 μm.

Holmium oxide has a cubic, yet rather complex bixbyite structure, with many atoms per unit cell and a large lattice constant of 1.06 nm. This structure is characteristic of oxides of heavy rare-earth elements, such as Tb_{2}O_{3}, Dy_{2}O_{3}, Er_{2}O_{3}, Tm_{2}O_{3}, Yb_{2}O_{3} and Lu_{2}O_{3}. The thermal expansion coefficient of Ho_{2}O_{3} is also relatively large at 7.4 ×10^{−6}/°C.

=== Chemical ===
Treating holmium oxide with hydrogen chloride or with ammonium chloride affords the corresponding holmium chloride:

Ho_{2}O_{3} + 6 NH_{4}Cl → 2 HoCl_{3} + 6 NH_{3} + 3 H_{2}O

Holmium(III) oxide can also react with hydrogen sulfide to form holmium(III) sulfide at high temperatures.

== History ==
Holmium (Holmia, Latin name for Stockholm) was discovered by Marc Delafontaine and Jacques-Louis Soret in 1878 who noticed the aberrant spectrographic absorption bands of the then-unknown element (they called it "Element X"). Later in 1878, Per Teodor Cleve independently discovered the element while he was working on erbia earth (erbium oxide).

Using the method developed by Carl Gustaf Mosander, Cleve first removed all of the known contaminants from erbia. The result of that effort was two new materials, one brown and one green. He named the brown substance holmia (after the Latin name for Cleve's home town, Stockholm) and the green one thulia. Holmia was later found to be the holmium oxide and thulia was thulium oxide.

== Occurrence ==
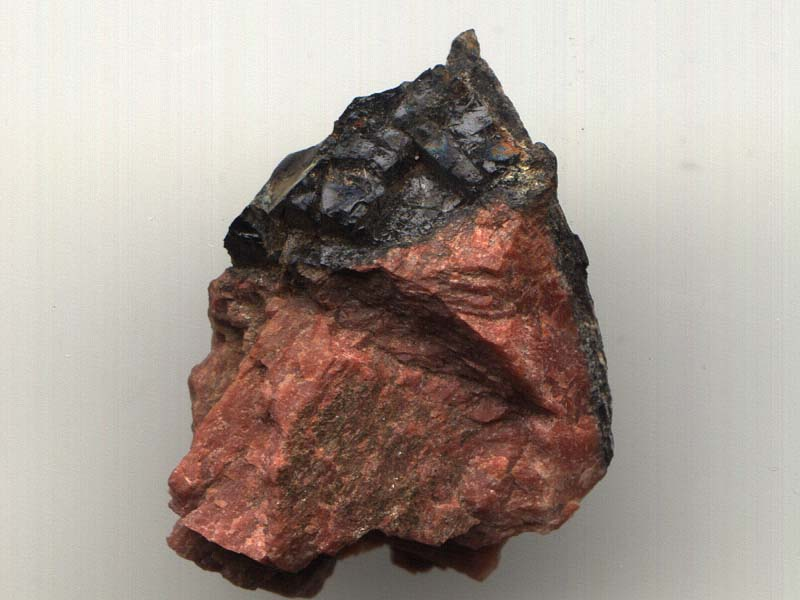
Gadolinite contains traces of holmium(III) oxide

Holmium readily oxidizes in air; therefore presence of holmium in nature is synonymous with that of holmia. Holmium oxide occurs in trace amounts in the minerals gadolinite, monazite, and in other rare-earth minerals.

== Production ==
A typical extraction process of holmium oxide can be simplified as follows: the mineral mixtures are crushed and ground. Monazite, because of its magnetic properties can be separated by repeated electromagnetic separation. After separation, it is treated with hot concentrated sulfuric acid to produce water-soluble sulfates of several rare earth elements. The acidic filtrates are partially neutralized with sodium hydroxide to pH 3–4. Thorium precipitates out of solution as hydroxide and is removed. After that, the solution is treated with ammonium oxalate to convert rare earths in to their insoluble oxalates. The oxalates are converted to oxides by annealing. The oxides are dissolved in nitric acid that excludes one of the main components, cerium, whose oxide is insoluble in HNO_{3}.

The most efficient separation routine for holmium oxide from the rare-earths is ion exchange. In this process, rare-earth ions are adsorbed onto suitable ion-exchange resin by exchange with hydrogen, ammonium or cupric ions present in the resin. The rare earth ions are then selectively washed out by suitable complexing agent, such as ammonium citrate or nitrilotriacetate.

== Applications ==
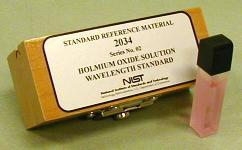
A solution of 4% holmium oxide in 10% perchloric acid, permanently fused into a quartz cuvette as an optical calibration standard

Holmium oxide is one of the colorants used for cubic zirconia and glass, providing yellow or red coloring. Glass containing holmium oxide and holmium oxide solutions (usually in perchloric acid) have sharp optical absorption peaks in the spectral range 200-900 nm. They are therefore used as a calibration standard for optical spectrophotometers and are available commercially. As most other oxides of rare-earth elements, holmium oxide is used as a specialty catalyst, phosphor and a laser material. Holmium laser operates at wavelength of about 2.08 micrometres, either in pulsed or continuous regime. This laser is eye safe and is used in medicine, lidars, wind velocity measurements and atmosphere monitoring.

== Health effects ==
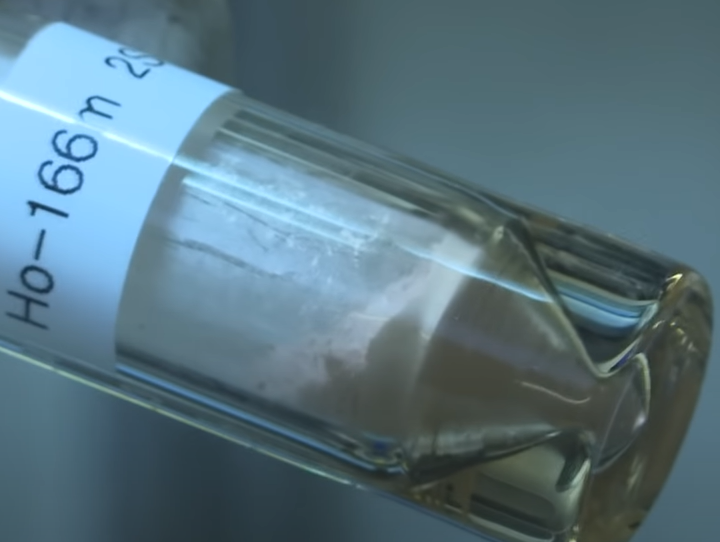
Holmium-166m oxide, an isotopologue

Holmium(III) oxide is, compared to many other compounds, not very dangerous, although repeated overexposure can cause granuloma and hemoglobinemia. It has low oral, dermal and inhalation toxicities and is non-irritating. The acute oral median lethal dose (LD_{50}) is greater than 1 g per kilogram of body weight.
