= Holmium =

Holmium, _{67}Ho
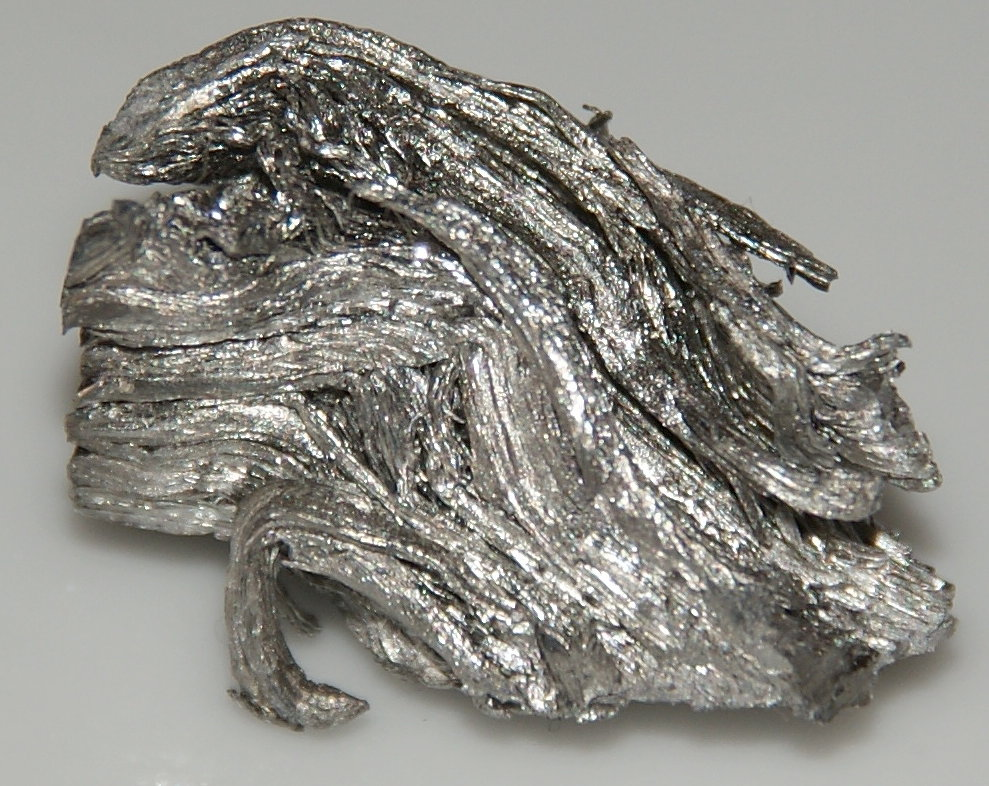

Holmium
- Pronunciation: /ˈhoʊlmiəm/ (HOHL-mee-əm)
- Appearance: silvery white

Standard atomic weight A_{r}°(Ho)
- 164.930329±0.000005; 164.93±0.01 (abridged)

Holmium in the periodic table
Hydrogen																															Helium
Lithium	Beryllium																									Boron	Carbon	Nitrogen	Oxygen	Fluorine	Neon
Sodium	Magnesium																									Aluminium	Silicon	Phosphorus	Sulfur	Chlorine	Argon
Potassium	Calcium															Scandium	Titanium	Vanadium	Chromium	Manganese	Iron	Cobalt	Nickel	Copper	Zinc	Gallium	Germanium	Arsenic	Selenium	Bromine	Krypton
Rubidium	Strontium															Yttrium	Zirconium	Niobium	Molybdenum	Technetium	Ruthenium	Rhodium	Palladium	Silver	Cadmium	Indium	Tin	Antimony	Tellurium	Iodine	Xenon
Caesium	Barium	Lanthanum	Cerium	Praseodymium	Neodymium	Promethium	Samarium	Europium	Gadolinium	Terbium	Dysprosium	Holmium	Erbium	Thulium	Ytterbium	Lutetium	Hafnium	Tantalum	Tungsten	Rhenium	Osmium	Iridium	Platinum	Gold	Mercury (element)	Thallium	Lead	Bismuth	Polonium	Astatine	Radon
Francium	Radium	Actinium	Thorium	Protactinium	Uranium	Neptunium	Plutonium	Americium	Curium	Berkelium	Californium	Einsteinium	Fermium	Mendelevium	Nobelium	Lawrencium	Rutherfordium	Dubnium	Seaborgium	Bohrium	Hassium	Meitnerium	Darmstadtium	Roentgenium	Copernicium	Nihonium	Flerovium	Moscovium	Livermorium	Tennessine	Oganesson
–
↑
Ho
↓
Es
dysprosium ← holmium → erbium
- Atomic number (Z): 67
- Group: f-block groups (no number)
- Period: period 6
- Block: f-block
- Electron configuration: [Xe] 4f^{11} 6s^{2}
- Electrons per shell: 2, 8, 18, 29, 8, 2

Physical properties
- Phase at STP: solid
- Melting point: 1734 K (1461 °C, 2662 °F)
- Boiling point: 2873 K (2600 °C, 4712 °F)
- Density (at 20° C): 8.795 g/cm^{3}
- when liquid (at m.p.): 8.34 g/cm^{3}
- Heat of fusion: 17.0 kJ/mol
- Heat of vaporization: 251 kJ/mol
- Molar heat capacity: 27.15 J/(mol·K)
- Specific heat capacity: 164.615 J/(kg·K)
Vapor pressure
P (Pa)	1	10	100	1 k	10 k	100 k
at T (K)	1432	1584	(1775)	(2040)	(2410)	(2964)

Atomic properties
- Oxidation states: common: +3; 0, +2
- Electronegativity: Pauling scale: 1.23
- Ionization energies: 1st: 581.0 kJ/mol; 2nd: 1140 kJ/mol; 3rd: 2204 kJ/mol
- Atomic radius: empirical: 176 pm
- Covalent radius: 192±7 pm
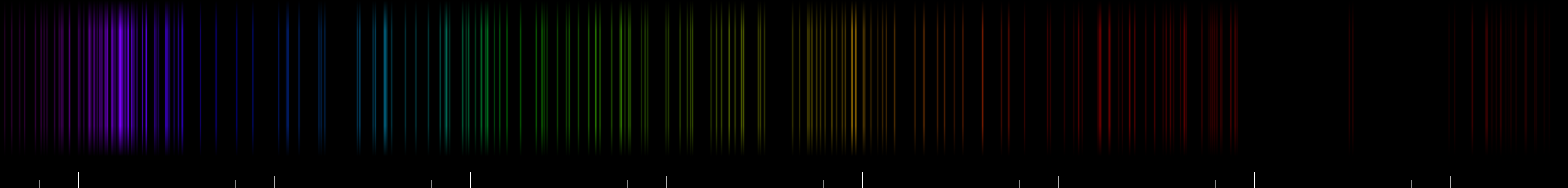
- Spectral lines of holmium

Other properties
- Natural occurrence: primordial
- Crystal structure: hexagonal close-packed (hcp) (hP2)
- Lattice constants: a = 357.80 pm c = 561.77 pm (at 20 °C)
- Thermal expansion: poly: 11.2 µm/(m⋅K) (at r.t.)
- Thermal conductivity: 16.2 W/(m⋅K)
- Electrical resistivity: poly: 814 nΩ⋅m (at r.t.)
- Magnetic ordering: paramagnetic
- Young's modulus: 64.8 GPa
- Shear modulus: 26.3 GPa
- Bulk modulus: 40.2 GPa
- Speed of sound thin rod: 2760 m/s (at 20 °C)
- Poisson ratio: 0.231
- Vickers hardness: 410–600 MPa
- Brinell hardness: 500–1250 MPa
- CAS Number: 7440-60-0

History
- Naming: from Holmia, the Latin name for the city of Stockholm, home town of its discoverer
- Discovery: Per Theodor Cleve, Jacques-Louis Soret and Marc Delafontaine (1878)
- First isolation: Heinrich Bommer (1939)

Isotopes of holmium
Main isotopes			Decay	
Isotope	abundance	half-life (t_{1/2})	mode	product
^{163}Ho	synth	4570 y	ε	^{163}Dy
^{164}Ho	synth	28.8 min	ε	^{164}Dy
^{164}Ho	synth	28.8 min	β^{−}	^{164}Er
^{165}Ho	100%	stable		
^{166}Ho	synth	26.812 h	β^{−}	^{166}Er
^{166m1}Ho	synth	1133 y	β^{−}	^{166}Er
^{167}Ho	synth	3.1 h	β^{−}	^{167}Er

Holmium is a chemical element; it has symbol Ho and atomic number 67. It is a rare-earth element and the eleventh member of the lanthanide series of elements. It is a relatively soft, silvery, fairly corrosion-resistant and malleable metal. Like many other lanthanides, holmium is too reactive to be found in native form, as pure holmium slowly forms a yellowish oxide coating when exposed to air. When isolated, holmium is relatively stable in dry air at room temperature. However, it reacts with water and corrodes readily, and also burns in air when heated.

In nature, no free holmium or even an ore with significant amounts of holmium has been found. Holmium occurs together with the other rare-earth metals and it is difficult to separate. Holmium was discovered through isolation by Swedish chemist Per Theodor Cleve. It was also independently discovered by Jacques-Louis Soret and Marc Delafontaine, who together observed it spectroscopically in 1878. Its oxide was first isolated from rare-earth ores by Cleve in 1878. The element's name comes from Holmia, the Latin name for the city of Stockholm.

Like many other lanthanides, holmium is found in the minerals monazite and gadolinite and is usually commercially extracted from monazite using ion-exchange techniques. Its compounds in nature and in nearly all of its laboratory chemistry are trivalently oxidized, containing Ho(III) ions. Trivalent holmium ions have fluorescent properties similar to many other rare-earth ions (while yielding their own set of unique emission light lines), and thus are used in the same way as some other rare earths in certain laser and glass-colorant applications.

Holmium has the highest magnetic permeability and magnetic saturation of any element and is thus used for the pole pieces of the strongest static magnets. Because holmium strongly absorbs neutrons, it is also used as a burnable poison in nuclear reactors.

== Properties ==
Holmium is the eleventh member of the lanthanide series. In the periodic table, it appears in period 6, between the lanthanides dysprosium to its left and erbium to its right, and above the actinide einsteinium.

=== Physical properties ===
With a boiling point of 3,000 K (2,727 °C; 4,940 °F), holmium is the sixth most volatile lanthanide after ytterbium, europium, samarium, thulium and dysprosium. At standard temperature and pressure, holmium, like many of the second half of the lanthanides, normally assumes a hexagonally close-packed (hcp) structure. Its 67 electrons are arranged in the configuration [Xe] 4f^{11} 6s^{2}, so that it has thirteen valence electrons filling the 4f and 6s subshells.

Holmium, like all of the lanthanides, is paramagnetic at standard temperature and pressure. However, holmium is ferromagnetic at temperatures below 19 K (−254.2 °C; −425.5 °F). It has the highest magnetic moment (10.6 μ_{B}) of any naturally occurring element and possesses other unusual magnetic properties.

=== Chemical properties ===
Holmium metal tarnishes slowly in air, forming a yellowish oxide layer that has an appearance similar to that of iron rust. It burns readily to form holmium(III) oxide:

4 Ho + 3 O_{2} → 2 Ho_{2}O_{3}

It is a relatively soft and malleable element that is fairly corrosion-resistant and chemically stable in dry air at standard temperature and pressure. In moist air and at higher temperatures, however, it quickly oxidizes, forming a yellowish oxide. In pure form, holmium possesses a metallic, bright silvery luster.

Holmium is quite electropositive: on the Pauling electronegativity scale, it has an electronegativity of 1.23. It is generally trivalent. It reacts slowly with cold water and quickly with hot water to form holmium(III) hydroxide:

2 Ho(s) + 6 H_{2}O(l) → 2 Ho(OH)_{3}(aq) + 3 H_{2}(g)

Holmium metal reacts with all the stable halogens:

2 Ho(s) + 3 F_{2}(g) → 2 HoF_{3}(s) [pink]

2 Ho(s) + 3 Cl_{2}(g) → 2 HoCl_{3}(s) [yellow]

2 Ho(s) + 3 Br_{2}(g) → 2 HoBr_{3}(s) [yellow]

2 Ho(s) + 3 I_{2}(g) → 2 HoI_{3}(s) [yellow]

Holmium dissolves readily in dilute sulfuric acid to form solutions containing the yellow Ho(III) ions, which exist as [Ho(H_{2}O)_{9}]^{3+} complexes:

2 Ho(s) + 3 H_{2}SO_{4}(aq) → 2 Ho^{3+}(aq) + 3 SO_{4}^{2−}(aq) + 3 H_{2}(g)

==== Oxidation states ====
As with many lanthanides, holmium is usually found in the +3 oxidation state, forming compounds such as holmium(III) fluoride (HoF_{3}) and holmium(III) chloride (HoCl_{3}). Holmium in solution is in the form of Ho^{3+} surrounded by nine molecules of water. Holmium dissolves in acids. However, holmium is also found to exist in +2, +1 and 0 oxidation states.

=== Isotopes ===
Natural holmium consists of one primordial isotope, holmium-165. It is observationally stable, though theoretically should undergo alpha decay to terbium-161 with a very long half-life.

The known isotopes of holmium range from ^{140}Ho to ^{175}Ho. The primary decay mode before the stable ^{165}Ho, is beta plus decay to dysprosium isotopes, and the primary mode after is beta minus decay to erbium isotopes. Of the 35 synthetic radioactive isotopes among these, the most stable one is holmium-163 (^{163}Ho), with a half-life of 4570 years. The next most stable is holmium-166 (^{166}Ho) having a half-life of 26.812 hours, and others have half-lives under 4 hours.

The metastable isomer ^{166m1}Ho has the unusually long half-life of 1133 years. With a very low excitation energy, it does not decay to the ground state but beta-decays directly, having a particularly rich spectrum of gamma rays, making this isotope useful as a means for calibrating gamma ray spectrometers.

Holmium-166 (ground state) has been studied for medical application.

== Compounds ==
=== Oxides and chalcogenides ===
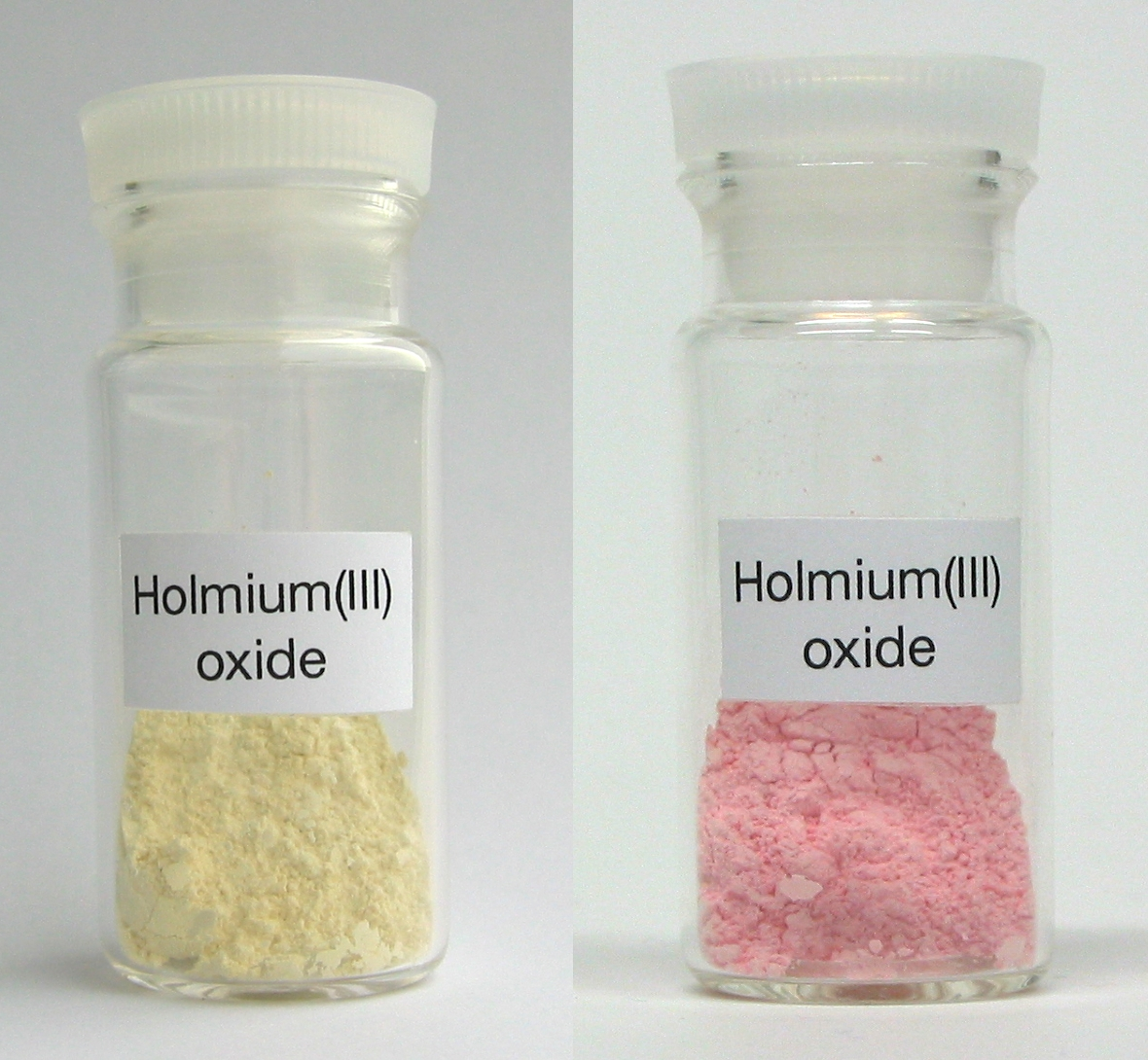
Ho_{2}O_{3}, left: natural light, right: under a cold-cathode fluorescent lamp

Holmium(III) oxide is the only oxide of holmium. It changes its color depending on the lighting conditions. In daylight, it has a yellowish color. Under trichromatic light, it appears orange red, almost indistinguishable from the appearance of erbium oxide under the same lighting conditions. The color change is related to the sharp emission lines of trivalent holmium ions acting as red phosphors. Holmium(III) oxide appears pink under a cold-cathode fluorescent lamp.

Other chalcogenides are known for holmium. Holmium(III) sulfide has orange-yellow crystals in the monoclinic crystal system, with the space group P2_{1}/m (No. 11). Under high pressure, holmium(III) sulfide can form in the cubic and orthorhombic crystal systems. It can be obtained by the reaction of holmium(III) oxide and hydrogen sulfide at 1,598 K (1,325 °C; 2,417 °F). Holmium(III) selenide is also known. It is antiferromagnetic below 6 K.

=== Halides ===
All four trihalides of holmium are known. Holmium(III) fluoride is a yellowish powder that can be produced by reacting holmium(III) oxide and ammonium fluoride, then crystallising it from the ammonium salt formed in solution. Holmium(III) chloride can be prepared in a similar way, with ammonium chloride instead of ammonium fluoride. It has the YCl_{3} layer structure in the solid state. These compounds, as well as holmium(III) bromide and holmium(III) iodide, can be obtained by the direct reaction of the elements:

2 Ho + 3 X_{2} → 2 HoX_{3}

In addition, holmium(III) iodide can be obtained by the direct reaction of holmium and mercury(II) iodide, then removing the mercury by distillation.

=== Organoholmium compounds ===
Organoholmium compounds are very similar to those of the other lanthanides, as they all share an inability to undergo π backbonding. They are thus mostly restricted to the mostly ionic cyclopentadienides (isostructural with those of lanthanum) and the σ-bonded simple alkyls and aryls, some of which may be polymeric.

== History ==
Holmium (Holmia, Latin name for Stockholm) was discovered by the Swiss chemists Jacques-Louis Soret and Marc Delafontaine in 1878 who noticed the aberrant spectrographic emission spectrum of the then-unknown element (they called it "Element X").

The Swedish chemist Per Teodor Cleve also independently discovered the element while he was working on erbia earth (erbium oxide). He was the first to isolate impure oxide of the new element. Using the method developed by the Swedish chemist Carl Gustaf Mosander, Cleve first removed all of the known contaminants from erbia. The result of that effort was two new materials, one brown and one green. He named the brown substance holmia (after the Latin name for Cleve's home town, Stockholm) and the green one thulia. Holmia was later found to be the holmium oxide, and thulia was thulium oxide. The pure oxide was only isolated in 1911 and the metal in 1939 by Heinrich Bommer.

In the English physicist Henry Moseley's classic paper on atomic numbers, holmium was assigned the value 66. The holmium preparation he had been given to investigate had been impure, dominated by neighboring dysprosium. He would have seen x-ray emission lines for both elements, but assumed that the dominant ones belonged to holmium, instead of the dysprosium impurity.

== Occurrence and production ==
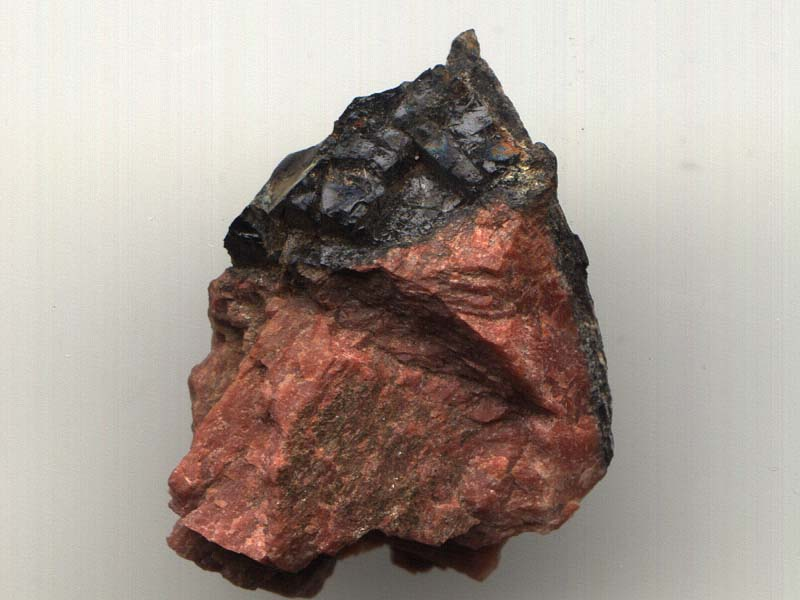
A specimen of gadolinite

Like all the other rare-earth elements, holmium is not naturally found as a free element. It occurs combined with other elements in gadolinite, monazite and other rare-earth minerals. No holmium-dominant mineral has yet been found. The main mining areas are China, United States, Brazil, India, Sri Lanka, and Australia with reserves of holmium estimated as 400,000 tonnes. The annual production of holmium metal is of about 10 tonnes per year.

Holmium makes up 1.3 parts per million of the Earth's crust by mass. Holmium makes up 1 part per million of the soils, 400 parts per quadrillion of seawater, and almost none of Earth's atmosphere, which is very rare for a lanthanide. It makes up 500 parts per trillion of the universe by mass.

Holmium is commercially extracted by ion exchange from monazite sand (0.05% holmium), but is still difficult to separate from other rare earths. The element has been isolated through the reduction of its anhydrous chloride or fluoride with metallic calcium. Holmium obeys the Oddo–Harkins rule: as an odd-numbered element, it is less abundant than both dysprosium and erbium. However, it is the most abundant of the odd-numbered heavy lanthanides. Of the lanthanides, only promethium, thulium, lutetium and terbium are less abundant on Earth. The principal current source are some of the ion-adsorption clays of southern China. Some of these have a rare-earth composition similar to that found in xenotime or gadolinite. Yttrium makes up about two-thirds of the total by mass; holmium is around 1.5%. Holmium is relatively inexpensive for a rare-earth metal with the price about 1000 USD/kg.

== Applications ==
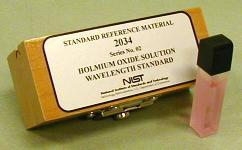
A solution of 4% holmium oxide in 10% perchloric acid, permanently fused into a quartz cuvette as an optical calibration standard

Glass containing holmium oxide and holmium oxide solutions (usually in perchloric acid) have sharp optical absorption peaks in the spectral range 200 to 900 nm. They are therefore used as a calibration standard for optical spectrophotometers. The radioactive but long-lived ^{166m1}Ho is used in calibration of gamma-ray spectrometers.

Holmium is used to create the strongest artificially generated magnetic fields, when placed within high-strength magnets as a magnetic pole piece (also called a magnetic flux concentrator). Holmium is also used in the manufacture of some permanent magnets.

Holmium can act as a sensitizer in sodium yttrium fluoride which takes advantage of its absorption in the NIR-II window. Holmium allows for lanthanide nanomaterials to have tunable emission and excitation in the NIR-II. Under 1143 nm excitation the interfacial energy transfer to other lanthanides allows a redshift in emission for biological applications. This allows deeper penetration than typically used 980 nm and 808 nm lasers.

Holmium-doped yttrium iron garnet (YIG) and yttrium lithium fluoride have applications in solid-state lasers, and Ho-YIG has applications in optical isolators and in microwave equipment (e.g., YIG spheres). Holmium lasers emit at 2.1 micrometres. They are used in medical, dental, and fiber-optical applications. It is also used in the enucleation of the prostate.

Since holmium can absorb nuclear fission-bred neutrons, it is used as a burnable poison to regulate nuclear reactors. It is used as a colorant for cubic zirconia, providing pink coloring, and for glass, providing yellow-orange coloring. In March 2017, IBM announced that they had developed a technique to store one bit of data on a single holmium atom set on a bed of magnesium oxide. With sufficient quantum and classical control techniques, holmium may be a good candidate to make quantum computers.

Holmium is used in the medical field, particularly in laser surgery for procedures such as kidney stone removal and prostate treatment, due to its precision and minimal tissue damage. Its isotope, holmium-166, is applied in targeted cancer therapies, especially for liver cancer, and it also enhances MRI imaging as a contrast agent.

== Biological role and precautions ==
Holmium plays no biological role in humans, but its salts are able to stimulate metabolism. Humans typically consume about a milligram of holmium a year. Plants do not readily take up holmium from the soil. Some vegetables have had their holmium content measured, and it amounted to 100 parts per trillion. Holmium and its soluble salts are slightly toxic if ingested, but insoluble holmium salts are nontoxic. Metallic holmium in dust form presents a fire and explosion hazard. Large amounts of holmium salts can cause severe damage if inhaled, consumed orally, or injected. The biological effects of holmium over a long period of time are not known. Holmium has a low level of acute toxicity.

== See also ==
- Category:Holmium compounds
- Period 6 element

== Bibliography ==
- Emsley, John (2011). Nature's Building Blocks: An A-Z Guide to the Elements. Oxford University Press. ISBN 978-0-19-960563-7.
- Greenwood, Norman N.; Earnshaw, Alan (1997). Chemistry of the Elements (2nd ed.). Butterworth-Heinemann. ISBN 978-0-08-037941-8.
- Stwertka, Albert (1998). A guide to the elements (2nd ed.). Oxford University Press. ISBN 0-19-508083-1.
- Cullity, B. D.; Graham, C. D. (2005). Introduction to Magnetic Materials. John Wiley & Sons. ISBN 978-1-118-21149-6.
- Jiles, David (1998). Introduction to magnetism and magnetic materials. CRC Press. ISBN 0-412-79860-3.
- Ganjali, Mohammad Reza; Gupta, Vinod Kumar; Faridbod, Farnoush; Norouzi, Parviz (2016-02-25). Lanthanides Series Determination by Various Analytical Methods. Elsevier. ISBN 978-0-12-420095-1.
- Tonkov, E. Yu (1998). Compounds and Alloys Under High Pressure A Handbook. CRC Press. ISBN 978-90-5699-047-3.
- G. Meyer; Lester R. Morss, eds. (1991). Synthesis of Lanthanide and Actinide Compounds. Kluwer Academic Publishers. ISBN 0-7923-1018-7.
- Riedel, moderne anorganische Chemie (in German). Erwin Riedel, Christoph Janiak, Hans-Jürgen Meyer (4. Aufl ed.). Berlin: De Gruyter. 2012. ISBN 978-3-11-024900-2. OCLC 781540844.
- Wells, A. F. (1984). Structural inorganic chemistry (5th ed.). Oxford [Oxfordshire]: Clarendon Press. ISBN 978-0-19-855370-0. OCLC 8866491.
- Weeks, Mary Elvira (1956). The discovery of the elements (6th ed.). Easton, PA: Journal of Chemical Education.
