= Thulium compounds =

Thulium compounds are compounds containing the chemical element thulium (Tm). As with most lanthanides, the chemistry of thulium is dominated by the +3 oxidation state, corresponding to the Tm^{3+} ion with a 4f^{12} electron configuration. Thulium(III) compounds are generally highly ionic, and hydrated salts commonly contain highly coordinated Tm^{3+} ions. Unlike many of the lighter lanthanides, however, thulium also has substantial chemistry in the +2 oxidation state, which is stabilized by the nearly filled 4f shell. Well-characterized divalent compounds include TmCl_{2}, TmBr_{2} and TmI_{2}, while a formally monovalent iodide, TmI, has also been reported.

A wide range of binary thulium compounds are known, including thulium(III) oxide and other chalcogenides, halides, hydrides, borides, carbides, silicides and pnictides. The monochalcogenides TmS, TmSe and TmTe are particularly notable because the average valence of thulium changes across the series from predominantly trivalent in TmS, through intermediate valence in TmSe, to predominantly divalent in TmTe. Several thulium borides and pnictides also display magnetic ordering or other unusual low-temperature electronic behaviour.

Thulium also forms numerous hydrated oxoacid salts and coordination compounds, including nitrates, sulfates and oxalates. The optical and magnetic properties of Tm^{3+}, together with the accessible Tm^{2+} state, have led to extensive study of thulium compounds in solid-state, coordination and materials chemistry.

== Chalcogenides ==
=== Oxides ===
Thulium(III) oxide, Tm_{2}O_{3}, also known as thulia, is the principal oxide of thulium. It has the cubic bixbyite structure, a fluorite-related structure adopted by many heavier rare-earth sesquioxides, with a lattice parameter of approximately 1.049 nm. Thulium metal burns in oxygen to form the oxide:

4Tm + 3O_{2} → 2Tm_{2}O_{3}

Thin films of Tm_{2}O_{3} have been investigated as high-k dielectric materials. Single-crystalline films have been grown on silicon by molecular-beam epitaxy using metallic thulium and atomic oxygen, and reported dielectric constants are around 10.

=== Other chalcogenides ===
Thulium forms both mono- and sesquichalcogenides with sulfur, selenium and tellurium. The monochalcogenides TmS, TmSe and TmTe are especially notable because the mean oxidation state of thulium changes markedly across the series. TmS is predominantly trivalent and metallic, TmSe is a homogeneous intermediate-valence compound, and TmTe is predominantly divalent and semiconducting. All three have structures based on the sodium chloride lattice.

Thulium monoselenide, TmSe, is one of the best-studied mixed-valence thulium compounds. Its thulium ions fluctuate between configurations corresponding approximately to Tm^{2+} and Tm^{3+}, giving a mean valence intermediate between the two integer states. Stoichiometric TmSe crystallizes in the cubic sodium chloride structure; reported room-temperature lattice parameters are around 0.57 nm, although the value varies noticeably with stoichiometry and thulium valence.

Thulium monotelluride, TmTe, is predominantly a Tm^{2+} compound and crystallizes in the sodium chloride structure. Single crystals of stoichiometric TmTe have a lattice parameter of approximately 0.636 nm. Thulium-deficient telluride of composition close to Tm_{2}Te_{3} instead adopts a vacancy-ordered structure related to the Sc_{2}S_{3} type, showing that changes in stoichiometry are closely linked to the valence of thulium.

Thulium(III) sulfide, Tm_{2}S_{3}, is known in several structural modifications. The δ form crystallizes in the monoclinic δ-Ho_{2}S_{3} structure type, space group P2_{1}/m, with thulium atoms in six- and seven-coordinate sulfur environments. A second monoclinic modification, F-Tm_{2}S_{3}, contains four crystallographically distinct thulium sites with coordination numbers of six, seven and eight. Under pressure, Tm_{2}S_{3} undergoes further structural transformations; the ambient-pressure δ phase has also been studied for its pressure-dependent optical and electronic properties.

== Halides ==
=== Trihalides ===
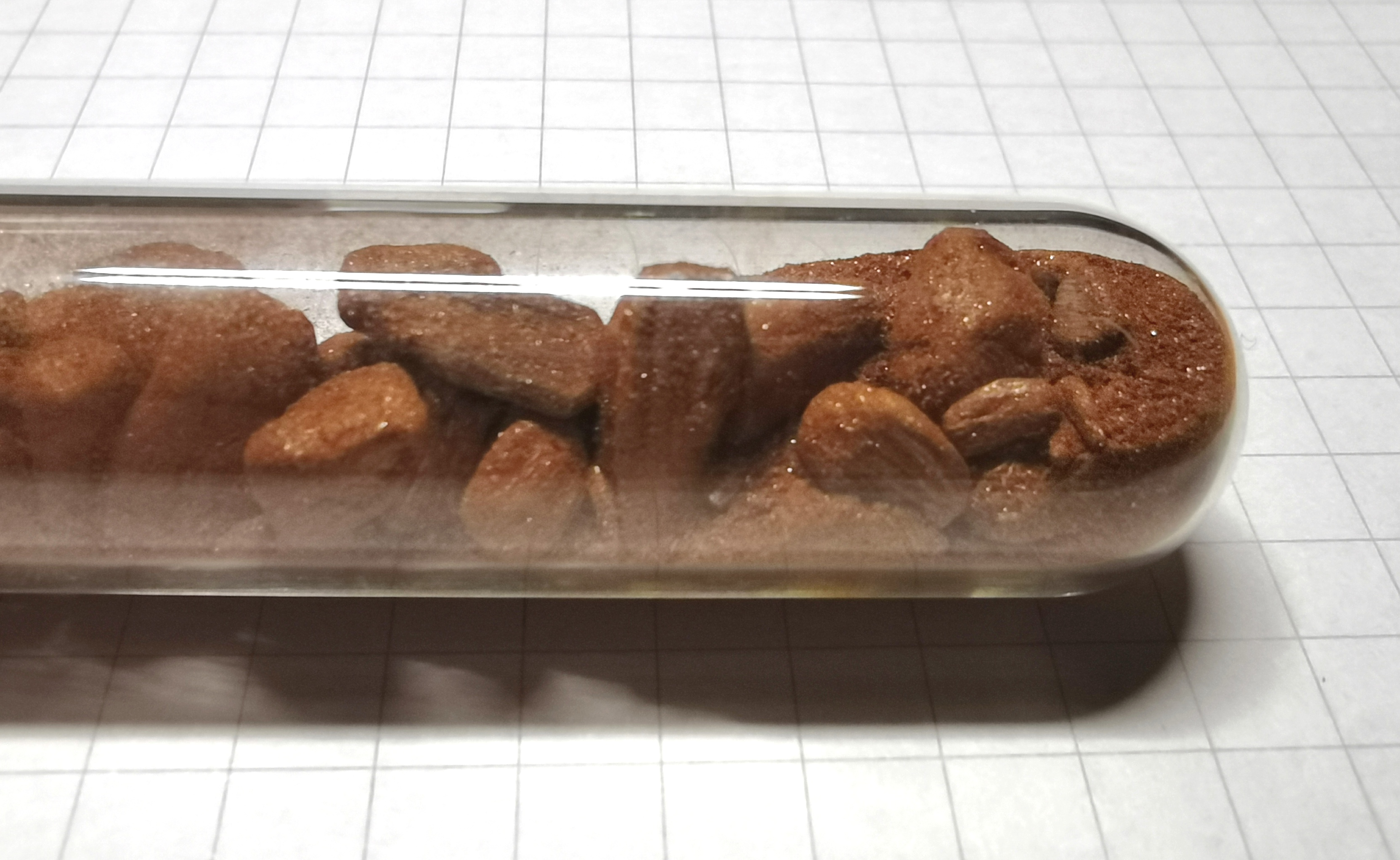
Thulium(III) iodide crystals sealed in a glass ampoule

Thulium forms the four trihalides TmF_{3}, TmCl_{3}, TmBr_{3} and TmI_{3}. Their structures follow the trends found among the heavier rare-earth halides.

Thulium(III) fluoride, TmF_{3}, crystallizes at ambient conditions in the orthorhombic YF_{3} structure type, space group Pnma. Its room-temperature lattice parameters are approximately a = 0.6283 nm, b = 0.6811 nm and c = 0.4408 nm. At high temperature TmF_{3} transforms to a hexagonal modification. Its low-temperature magnetic behaviour is dominated by crystal-field splitting of the Tm^{3+} ground state.

Thulium(III) chloride, TmCl_{3}, is a yellow solid and adopts the monoclinic AlCl_{3} structure type, space group C2/m. In this structure the Tm^{3+} ions are octahedrally coordinated by chloride ions. The same structure type is adopted by several neighbouring heavy-lanthanide trichlorides.

Thulium(III) bromide, TmBr_{3}, adopts the layered BiI_{3} structure type. In the hexagonal setting its lattice parameters are approximately a = 0.7005 nm and c = 1.9092 nm. Thulium(III) iodide, TmI_{3}, likewise belongs to the BiI_{3} structure family; the heavier lanthanide triiodides form layered structures of this type.

=== Divalent and lower halides ===
Unlike most lanthanides, thulium also forms well-characterized binary halides in the +2 oxidation state. Thulium(II) chloride (TmCl_{2}), thulium(II) bromide (TmBr_{2}) and thulium(II) iodide (TmI_{2}) contain genuine Tm^{2+} ions rather than the delocalized electrons found in some other nominal rare-earth dihalides. TmCl_{2} and TmBr_{2} adopt the orthorhombic SrI_{2} structure type, in which Tm^{2+} is seven-coordinate, whereas TmI_{2} adopts the layered CdI_{2} structure type with six-coordinate thulium.

TmCl_{2} can be obtained by reduction of TmCl_{3} with thulium metal. It melts congruently at 718 ± 3 °C and has orthorhombic lattice parameters of approximately a = 0.655 nm, b = 0.668 nm and c = 0.693 nm. When dissolved in water it gives a short-lived red solution as the divalent state is rapidly destroyed.

TmBr_{2} and TmI_{2} can be prepared by metallothermic reduction of the corresponding trihalides with lithium or sodium at 700–800 °C in sealed tantalum containers. TmI_{2} was first characterized as a divalent thulium compound in 1960; magnetic measurements confirmed the 4f^{13} configuration expected for Tm^{2+}.

Thulium(II) iodide is a strong reducing agent and also forms solvated molecular complexes, showing that divalent thulium chemistry is not confined to solid binary compounds. For example, dissolution of TmI_{2} in isopropylamine gives crystalline TmI_{2}(i^{−}PrNH_{2})_{4}, whose divalent oxidation state and molecular structure have been established spectroscopically and by X-ray diffraction.

An even lower formal oxidation state has been reported for thulium iodide. Reaction of thulium metal with iodine at 680 °C produced a mixture containing metallic thulium, TmI_{2} and approximately 21% TmI. Although pure TmI could not be isolated, its formation was supported by magnetic measurements and by its reactions with aromatic hydrocarbons.

== Hydrides ==
The thulium–hydrogen system contains two principal hydride phases, conventionally described as thulium dihydride and thulium trihydride. The hydrogen-poorer phase has a composition range of approximately TmH_{1.94}^{−}_{2.02} and is cubic, with a lattice parameter of 0.50894(8) nm. The hydrogen-rich phase, TmH_{2.87}^{−}_{2.97}, is hexagonal, with lattice parameters a = 0.35964(7) nm and c = 0.6493(2) nm.

A two-phase region separates the cubic and hexagonal hydrides and persists to at least 350 °C. The corresponding deuterides, TmD_{2.02} and TmD_{2.91}, have lattice parameters about 0.2% smaller than those of the analogous hydrides.

== Borides ==
Several binary borides of thulium are known, including TmB_{2}, TmB_{4} and TmB_{12}.

Thulium diboride, TmB_{2}, crystallizes in the hexagonal aluminium diboride structure type, space group P6/mmm, with lattice parameters a = 0.326016(5) nm and c = 0.375351(8) nm. It is a metallic ferromagnet, with long-range magnetic ordering below a Curie temperature of 7.2 K. Its measured effective magnetic moment of 7.49 μ_{B} per thulium atom is consistent with Tm^{3+}, and electronic-structure calculations indicate that its magnetic ordering is mediated by an RKKY interaction.

Thulium tetraboride, TmB_{4}, crystallizes in the tetragonal space group P4/mbm. The Tm^{3+} ions form a two-dimensional geometrically frustrated network equivalent to a Shastry–Sutherland lattice. It orders antiferromagnetically below approximately 11.7 K and has very strong Ising-like magnetic anisotropy. When a magnetic field is applied parallel to the crystallographic c axis, a sequence of fractional magnetization plateaus has been observed, including plateaus at 1/9, 1/8, 1/7 and 1/2 of the saturation magnetization.

Thulium dodecaboride, TmB_{12}, crystallizes in the cubic UB_{12} structure type, space group Fm3̅m. It orders antiferromagnetically at about 3.2–3.3 K. Mössbauer measurements indicate a non-magnetic Γ_{1} crystal-field singlet ground state; its ordered magnetic moment is induced by interaction with a magnetically split Γ_{4} triplet lying about 5 K above the ground state.

== Carbides and silicides ==
Thulium dicarbide, TmC_{2}, is an established binary carbide of thulium. At ambient conditions it crystallizes in the tetragonal calcium carbide structure type, space group I4/mmm, with lattice parameters of approximately a = 0.3602 nm and c = 0.6012 nm. High-temperature direct-synthesis calorimetry gives a standard enthalpy of formation of −31.5±2.5 kJ per mole of atoms for TmC_{2}.

The thulium–silicon system contains three well-established bulk silicides with substantially different compositions and structures: hexagonal Tm_{5}Si_{3}, orthorhombic TmSi and hexagonal Tm_{3}Si_{5}, the latter also being described approximately as TmSi_{1.7}. Direct-synthesis calorimetry gives standard enthalpies of formation of −86.1±2.3 and −76.1±2.3 kJ per mole of atoms for TmSi and Tm_{5}Si_{3}, respectively.

Thulium silicides can form epitaxial nanostructures on Si(001). Deposition of thulium on silicon followed by annealing produces both silicide islands and nanowires; the anisotropic lattice matching of the hexagonal Tm_{3}Si_{5} phase and orthorhombic TmSi allows one-dimensional epitaxial growth.

== Pnictides ==
Thulium forms binary compounds with all five pnictogens, including the monopnictides TmN, TmP, TmAs, TmSb and TmBi.

Thulium nitride, TmN, crystallizes in the cubic sodium chloride structure type at ambient pressure. Thin films of TmN can be prepared by direct-current reactive magnetron sputtering of thulium in nitrogen. Such films are initially largely amorphous and crystallize after annealing at approximately 800 °C.

Thulium phosphide, TmP, has the cubic sodium chloride structure at ambient pressure. Synchrotron X-ray diffraction measurements show that it undergoes a pressure-induced structural transition at approximately 53 GPa.

Thulium arsenide, TmAs, likewise adopts the sodium chloride structure at ambient pressure. First-principles calculations predict a transition to a caesium chloride-type structure at approximately 33 GPa, accompanied by a volume decrease of about 6.8%. The magnetic susceptibility and high-field magnetization of TmP and TmAs have long been interpreted largely in terms of crystal-field effects acting on thulium ions with a singlet ground state.

Thulium antimonide, TmSb, is another sodium-chloride-type monopnictide with a crystal-field singlet ground state. High-field measurements reveal an anomalous rise in magnetization near 450 kOe for fields applied along the [100] direction, attributed to a crystal-field level crossing.

Thulium bismuthide, TmBi, is an experimentally established phase in the thulium–bismuth system. Density-functional calculations describe rocksalt-type TmBi as a non-magnetic semimetal and predict a spin–orbit-driven band inversion and non-trivial topological surface states.

== Organothulium compounds ==
Organothulium chemistry includes compounds of both Tm^{3+} and Tm^{2+}. As with other lanthanides, the metal–carbon bonds are highly polar, but thulium is unusual in that comparatively stable divalent organometallic compounds can be isolated. Bulky cyclopentadienyl ligands are especially important for stabilizing Tm^{2+} centres.

One of the best-characterized divalent organothulium compounds is the neutral metallocene (Cp^ttt)_{2}Tm, where Cp^{ttt} is 1,2,4-tris(tert-butyl)cyclopentadienyl. It can be prepared either by reaction of TmI_{2} with sodium Cp^{ttt}, or by reduction of the corresponding Tm^{3+} iodide complex (Cp^ttt)_{2}TmI in non-polar solvents. Related Tm^{2+} complexes containing substituted cyclopentadienyl and phospholyl ligands have also been prepared from TmI_{2}. For example, reaction of TmI_{2}(THF)_{3} with sodium 1,2,4-tris(trimethylsilyl)cyclopentadienide gives the solvated divalent complex [(Cp''' )_{2}Tm(THF)].

Thulium also forms alkylidene complexes containing direct Tm–C multiple-bond character. The first such compounds were reported in 2006 using a dianionic bis(thiophosphinoyl)methylene ligand. Both an iodide-bridged dimer and a homoleptic bis(alkylidene) complex were characterized crystallographically. Their reaction with benzophenone produces an alkene, supporting substantial carbenic and nucleophilic character of the Tm–C bond. Structural studies also indicate a contribution from π overlap between carbon and thulium in stabilizing the homoleptic complex.

More recently, highly reducing Tm^{2+} sandwich compounds containing cyclooctatetraenyl ligands have been isolated. Bis(cyclooctatetraenyl) thulium(II) complexes behave as single-molecule magnets and were among the first examples showing that divalent thulium can combine strong reducing character with slow magnetic relaxation.

The high reducing power of divalent organothulium compounds also enables unusual small-molecule activation. For example, (Cp^ttt)_{2}Tm reductively couples carbon monoxide to form C_{2} ethynediolate and C_{3} ketenecarboxylate products, which can subsequently react with carbon dioxide.

== Other compounds ==
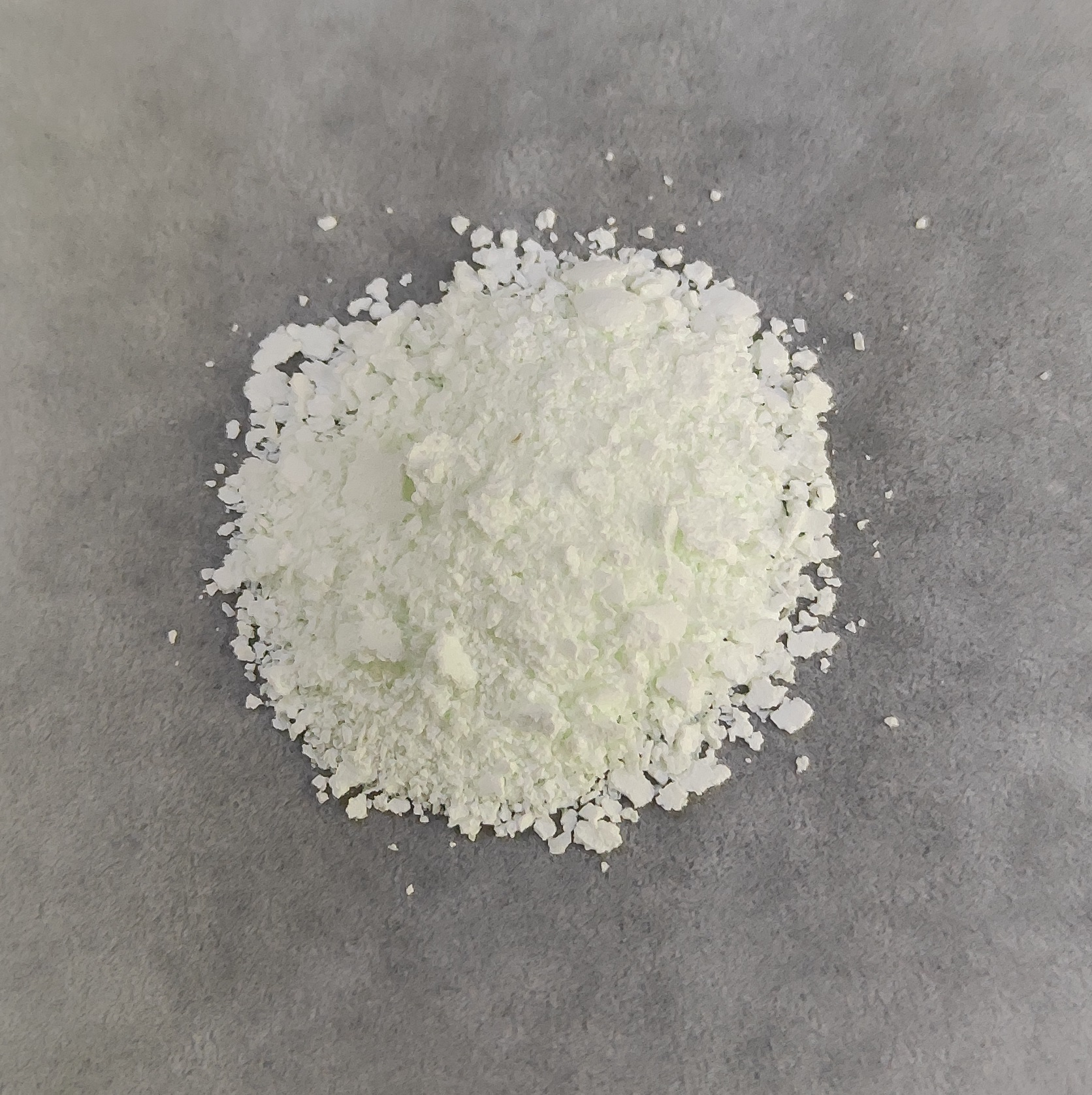
Thulium(III) hydroxide

Thulium(III) hydroxide, Tm(OH)_{3}, can be precipitated from aqueous solutions of soluble thulium(III) salts by addition of a base. On heating, it decomposes first to thulium oxyhydroxide, TmOOH, and on further heating to thulium(III) oxide, Tm_{2}O_{3}.

Thulium(III) nitrate, Tm(NO_{3})_{3}, forms several hydrates. The pentahydrate and hexahydrate have been structurally characterized and are more precisely formulated as [Tm(NO_{3})_{3}(H_{2}O)_{4}]·H_{2}O and [Tm(NO_{3})_{3}(H_{2}O)_{4}]·2H_{2}O, respectively. Both crystallize in the triclinic space group P1̅ and contain neutral molecular [Tm(NO_{3})_{3}(H_{2}O)_{4}] units. The Tm^{3+} ion is ten-coordinate, with three bidentate nitrate ions and four coordinated water molecules; the remaining water molecules occupy lattice sites and participate in hydrogen bonding. The compounds can be obtained by dissolving Tm_{2}O_{3} in hot concentrated nitric acid. The hexahydrate is the most highly hydrated thulium nitrate known and is also the heaviest rare-earth nitrate for which a hexahydrate has been structurally characterized.

Thulium(III) sulfate, Tm_{2}(SO_{4})_{3}, is known in both anhydrous and hydrated forms. The octahydrate, Tm_{2}(SO_{4})_{3}·8H_{2}O, forms single crystals and has been extensively studied spectroscopically because its well-defined crystal field splits the 4f^{12} energy levels of Tm^{3+}.

Thulium(III) oxalate, Tm_{2}(C_{2}O_{4})_{3}, forms hydrated compounds. A structurally characterized hexahydrate is more precisely formulated as [Tm_{2}(C_{2}O_{4})_{3}(H_{2}O)_{4}]·2H_{2}O. It crystallizes in the triclinic space group P1̅ and consists of two-dimensional layers in which oxalate ions bridge adjacent thulium centres. Each Tm^{3+} ion has an eight-coordinate environment that can be described as a distorted dicapped trigonal prism. Hydrogen bonding between coordinated and lattice water molecules links the layers into a three-dimensional network. Other hydrated thulium oxalates have also been reported.

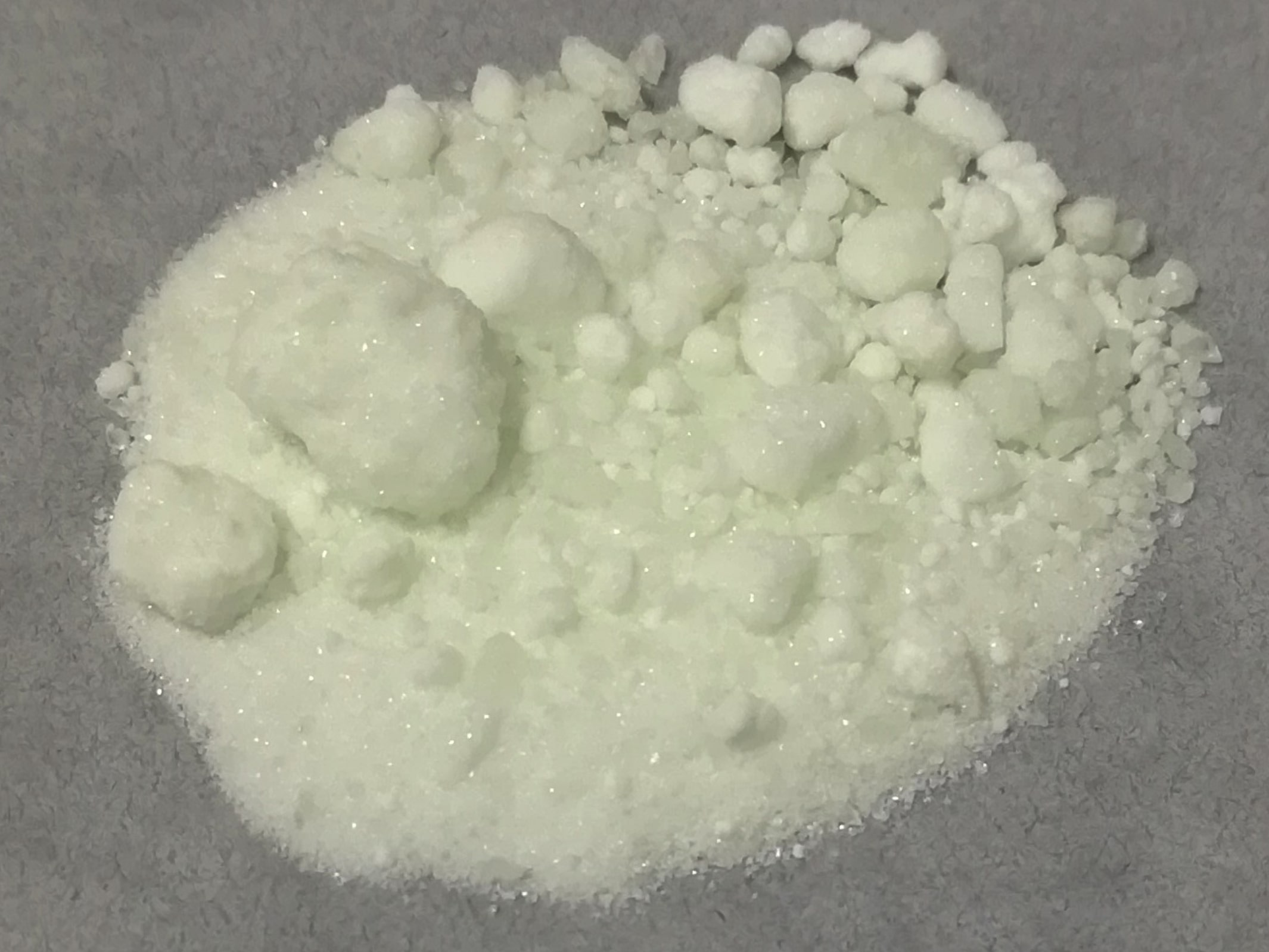
Thulium(III) acetate

Thulium(III) acetate, Tm(CH_{3}COO)_{3}, is known in anhydrous and hydrated forms. Single crystals of the tetrahydrate, Tm(CH_{3}COO)_{3}·4H_{2}O, have been studied by optical spectroscopy; their spectra show the characteristic crystal-field-split transitions of Tm^{3+}.

== Applications ==
The most important applications of thulium compounds arise from the optical properties of Tm^{3+}. Thulium-doped silica fibres and crystalline laser hosts emit broadly in the near-infrared around 1.8–2.1 μm, principally through the ^{3}F_{4} → ^{3}H_{6} transition. Tm^{3+}-doped fibres can be pumped efficiently near 790–800 nm; at sufficiently high thulium concentrations, cross-relaxation between neighbouring ions can produce two excited Tm^{3+} ions for each absorbed pump photon, contributing to high laser efficiencies.

Thulium-doped fibre lasers are used as sources of radiation near 2 μm. Their broad gain bandwidth and high achievable output power have led to applications in spectroscopy, remote and environmental sensing, materials processing and medicine. Thulium-doped crystals such as Tm:YAG and Tm:YLF are likewise used as solid-state laser gain media in the 1.9–2.0 μm region. The strong absorption of water at these wavelengths makes thulium lasers suitable for cutting and ablating water-rich biological tissue. Pulsed Tm:YAG lasers, for example, have been investigated for lithotripsy and endoscopic soft-tissue surgery.

Tm^{3+} is also widely used as an activator in phosphors and upconversion materials. When combined with sensitizers such as Yb^{3+}, near-infrared excitation can produce characteristic blue, red and near-infrared emission from thulium. Such materials have been investigated for optical thermometry, colour-tunable luminescence, imaging and security applications. In Tm^{3+}/Yb^{3+}-doped hosts, visible blue emission commonly occurs near 470–480 nm under excitation around 980 nm.

Thulium(III) oxide, Tm_{2}O_{3}, has also been investigated as a high-dielectric-constant material for microelectronics. Thin Tm_{2}O_{3} films can be grown epitaxially on silicon, and metal–oxide–semiconductor structures containing Tm_{2}O_{3} have been studied as potential high-k gate dielectrics because of their relatively large band gap and favourable band offsets with silicon.
