= Thulium(III) nitrate =

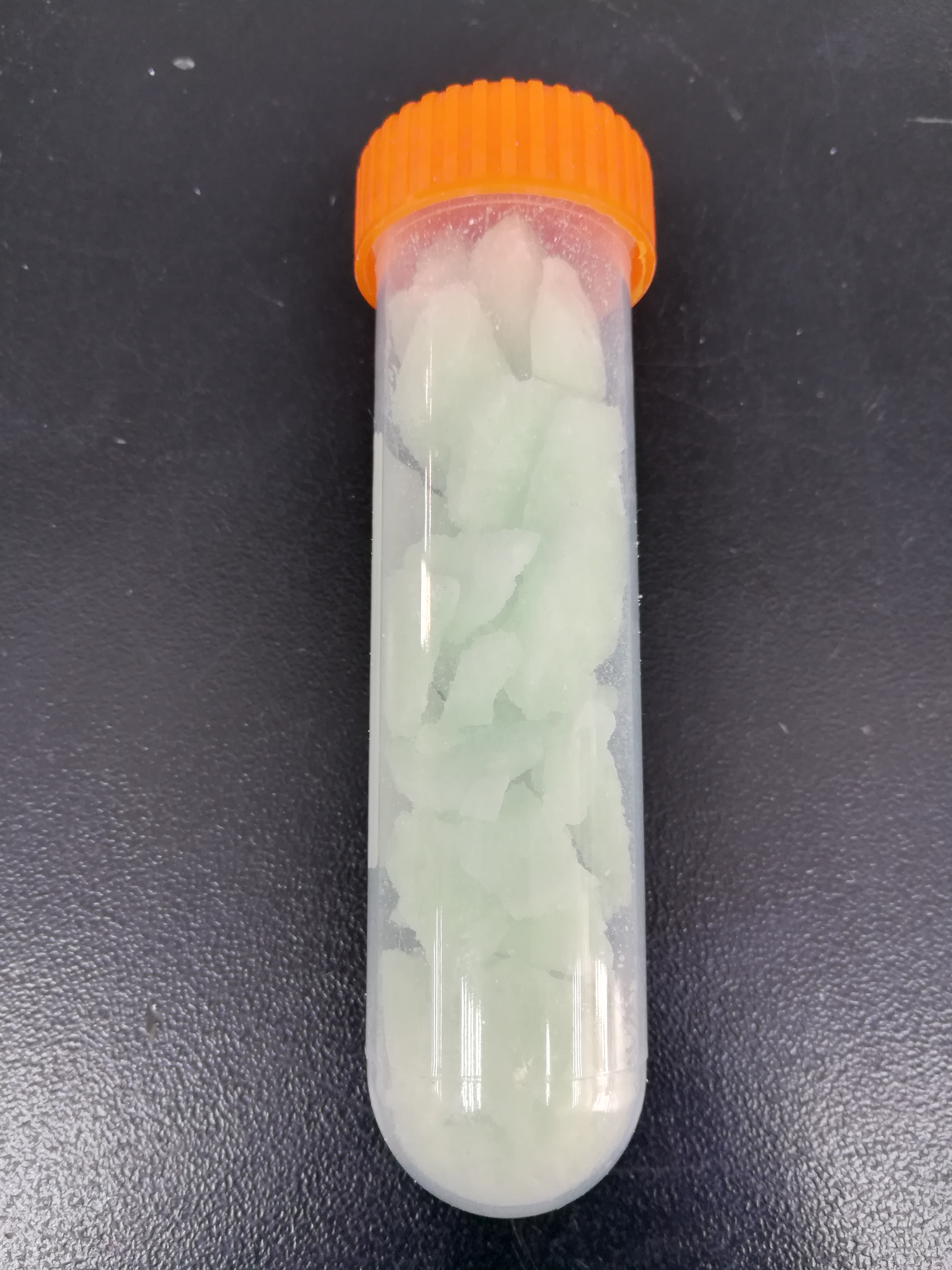

Names
- Other names Thulium trinitrate, Thulium nitrate

Identifiers
CAS Number	14985-19-4; pentahydrate: 36548-87-5; hexahydrate: 35725-33-8
3D model (JSmol)	Interactive image; pentahydrate: Interactive image; hexahydrate: Interactive image; tetrahydrate: Interactive image
ChemSpider	7974477
EC Number	pentahydrate: 628-321-7
PubChem CID	pentahydrate: 71311313; hexahydrate: 215464; tetrahydrate: 140412984
CompTox Dashboard (EPA)	DTXSID70890753; pentahydrate: DTXSID70189255
- InChI: pentahydrate: InChI=1S/3NO3.5H2O.Tm/c3*2-1(3)4;;;;;;/h;;;5*1H2;/q3*-1;;;;;;+3 Key: PEYIBPJKEYRLDB-UHFFFAOYSA-N; hexahydrate: InChI=1S/3NO3.6H2O.Tm/c3*2-1(3)4;;;;;;;/h;;;6*1H2;/q3*-1;;;;;;;+3 Key: FMAWDVZGWCKHEX-UHFFFAOYSA-N; tetrahydrate: InChI=1S/3NO3.4H2O.Tm/c3*2-1(3)4;;;;;/h;;;4*1H2;/q3*-1;;;;;+3 Key: HUSGBQPUDXPWPT-UHFFFAOYSA-N
- SMILES: [N+](=O)([O-])[O-].[N+](=O)([O-])[O-].[N+](=O)([O-])[O-].[Tm+3]; pentahydrate: [N+](=O)([O-])[O-].[N+](=O)([O-])[O-].[N+](=O)([O-])[O-].O.O.O.O.O.[Tm+3]; hexahydrate: [N+](=O)([O-])[O-].[N+](=O)([O-])[O-].[N+](=O)([O-])[O-].O.O.O.O.O.O.[Tm+3]; tetrahydrate: [N+](=O)([O-])[O-].[N+](=O)([O-])[O-].[N+](=O)([O-])[O-].O.O.O.O.[Tm+3]

Properties
Chemical formula	Tm(NO_{3})_{3}
Molar mass	354.949 g/mol
Appearance	Dark-green crystals
Solubility in water	Soluble

Hazards
- GHS labelling
Pictograms	(GHS03: Oxidizing) (GHS07: Exclamation mark)
Signal word	Warning
Hazard statements	H272, H315, H319, H335
Precautionary statements	P210, P220, P221, P261, P264, P271, P280, P302+P352, P304+P340, P305+P351+P338, P312, P321, P332+P313, P337+P313, P362, P370+P378, P403+P233, P405, P501

Related compounds
Related compounds	Terbium(III) nitrate, Lutetium(III) nitrate, Cerium(III) nitrate
- Except where otherwise noted, data are given for materials in their standard state (at 25 °C [77 °F], 100 kPa). Infobox references

Thulium(III) nitrate is an inorganic compound, a salt of thulium and nitric acid with the chemical formula Tm(NO_{3})_{3}. The compound forms dark-green crystals, readily soluble in water, also forms crystalline hydrates.

== Synthesis ==
Reaction of thulium and nitric acid:

Tm + 6 HNO_{3} → Tm(NO_{3})_{3} + 3 NO_{2} + 3 H_{2}O

Reaction of thulium hydroxide and nitric acid:

Tm(OH)_{3} + 3 HNO_{3} → Tm(NO_{3})_{3} + 3 H_{2}O

== Physical properties ==
Thulium(III) nitrate forms dark-green hygroscopic crystals.

Forms crystalline hydrates of the composition Tm(NO_{3})_{3}·5H_{2}O.

Soluble in water and ethanol.

== Chemical properties ==
Both the compound and its crystalline hydrate decompose on moderate heating.

Hydrated thulium nitrate thermally decomposes to form TmONO_{3} and decomposes to thulium oxide upon further heating.

== Applications ==
Thulium(III) nitrate hydrate is used as a reagent. Also used in optical glasses, ceramics, catalysts, electrical components, and photo-optical materials.
