= Curium(III) nitrate =

Names
- Other names Curium trinitrate, Curium nitrate

Identifiers
CAS Number	35311-12-7
3D model (JSmol)	Interactive image
ChemSpider	19989284
EC Number	252-508-9
PubChem CID	161867
CompTox Dashboard (EPA)	DTXSID40203290
- InChI: InChI=1S/Cm.3NO3/c;3*2-1(3)4/q;3*-1 Key: CUPQBVMHCGLRHY-UHFFFAOYSA-N
- SMILES: [N+](=O)([O-])[O-].[N+](=O)([O-])[O-].[N+](=O)([O-])[O-].[Cm]

Properties
Chemical formula	Cm(NO_{3})_{3}
Molar mass	433.09 g/mol
Melting point	400 °C (752 °F; 673 K)

Hazards
- GHS labelling
Signal word	Warning

Related compounds
Related compounds	Terbium(III) nitrate, Lutetium(III) nitrate, Cerium(III) nitrate
- Except where otherwise noted, data are given for materials in their standard state (at 25 °C [77 °F], 100 kPa). Infobox references

Curium(III) nitrate is an inorganic compound, a salt of curium and nitric acid with the chemical formula Cm(NO_{3})_{3}.

== Synthesis ==
Reaction of curium and nitric acid:

Cm + 4 HNO_{3} → Cm(NO_{3})_{3} + NO + 2 H_{2}O

== Physical properties ==
Curium(III) nitrate is a solid that exists as a hydrate or anhydrate, depending on the synthesis. The hydrates melt at 90 and 180 °C in crystallization water. The anhydrate decomposes to curium(IV) oxide at temperatures above 400 °C.

== Applications ==
Curium(III) nitrate can be used to make curium(IV) oxide.
