= Thulium arsenate =

Names
- Other names Thulium(III) arsenate

Identifiers
CAS Number	28548-45-0
3D model (JSmol)	Interactive image
PubChem CID	173858178
- InChI: InChI=1S/AsH3O4.Tm/c2-1(3,4)5;/h(H3,2,3,4,5);/q;+3/p-3 Key: VETOXQYCBYBXLQ-UHFFFAOYSA-K
- SMILES: [O-][As](=O)([O-])[O-].[Tm+3]

Properties
Chemical formula	TmAsO_{4}
Molar mass	307.85 g/mol
Appearance	Colorless crystalline solid
Solubility in water	Sparingly soluble in water

Structure
Crystal structure	Tetragonal, xenotime type
Space group	I4_{1}/amd, No. 141
Lattice constant	a = 0.69939 nm, c = 0.62595 nm
Formula units (Z)	4
- Except where otherwise noted, data are given for materials in their standard state (at 25 °C [77 °F], 100 kPa). Infobox references

Thulium arsenate is an inorganic compound of thulium and the arsenate ion, with the formula TmAsO_{4}. It is a sparingly soluble crystalline solid with the tetragonal xenotime structure type. At very low temperature it undergoes a cooperative Jahn–Teller structural transition.

== Preparation ==
Thulium arsenate can be prepared by precipitation from aqueous solutions containing Tm^{3+} and arsenate ions.

Single crystals have also been grown by a high-temperature flux method. In one procedure, thulium(III) oxide was reacted in molten lead pyroarsenate, Pb_{2}As_{2}O_{7}, at approximately 1300 °C.

== Properties ==
=== Crystal structure ===
At room temperature, TmAsO_{4} crystallizes in the tetragonal crystal system with the xenotime/zircon structure type, space group I4_{1}/amd (No. 141), with four formula units per unit cell.

Room-temperature lattice parameters of approximately a = 6.9939 Å and c = 6.2595 Å have been reported.

The structure consists of isolated AsO^{3−}_{4} tetrahedra and eight-coordinate Tm^{3+} ions. TmAsO_{4} belongs to the heavy rare-earth arsenate series, for which the xenotime structure is favored over the monoclinic monazite structure.

Polarized Raman spectroscopy shows the internal vibrational frequencies of the AsO_{4} tetrahedron increasing across the rare-earth arsenate series as the rare-earth ionic radius decreases.

=== Solubility ===
Thulium arsenate is sparingly soluble in water. Firsching reported a concentration-based solubility-product value of

pK_{sp,c} = 23.08 ± 0.01

for TmAsO_{4}.

=== Low-temperature phase transition ===
TmAsO_{4} is a well-studied cooperative Jahn–Teller material. At room temperature it is tetragonal and paramagnetic, but below a critical temperature of approximately 6.13 K it undergoes a symmetry-lowering distortion to an orthorhombic phase.

The transition arises because the crystal field leaves the lowest Tm^{3+} electronic state as a doublet. The cooperative Jahn–Teller distortion removes this degeneracy and creates ferroelastic domains with principal axes along the [110] and [11̅0] directions.

Optical absorption, magnetic susceptibility and enhanced ^{169}Tm NMR measurements show that the size of the Jahn–Teller splitting below the transition closely follows mean-field behavior.

Applied stress or magnetic field can alter the balance between the distorted domain states. First-order transitions between different distortion modes have been observed below the Jahn–Teller transition temperature.
