= Thulium perchlorate =

Names
- Other names Thulium(III) perchlorate

Identifiers
CAS Number	14014-10-9; hexahydrate: 64777-90-8
3D model (JSmol)	Interactive image; hexahydrate: Interactive image
ChemSpider	21160218; hexahydrate: 21395212
EC Number	237-827-3
PubChem CID	15335706; hexahydrate: 24884463
- InChI: InChI=1S/3ClHO4.Tm/c3*2-1(3,4)5;/h3*(H,2,3,4,5);/q;;;+3/p-3 Key: JNNWMYZIHRZEKX-UHFFFAOYSA-K; hexahydrate: InChI=1S/3ClHO4.6H2O.Tm/c3*2-1(3,4)5;;;;;;;/h3*(H,2,3,4,5);6*1H2;/q;;;;;;;;;+3/p-3 Key: IBWYNRXHGAOPRB-UHFFFAOYSA-K
- SMILES: [O-]Cl(=O)(=O)=O.[O-]Cl(=O)(=O)=O.[O-]Cl(=O)(=O)=O.[Tm+3]; hexahydrate: O.O.O.O.O.O.[O-]Cl(=O)(=O)=O.[O-]Cl(=O)(=O)=O.[O-]Cl(=O)(=O)=O.[Tm+3]

Properties
Chemical formula	Tm(ClO_{4})_{3}
Molar mass	467.29 g/mol
Appearance	Green crystals (hexahydrate)
Solubility in water	Soluble in water
- Except where otherwise noted, data are given for materials in their standard state (at 25 °C [77 °F], 100 kPa). Infobox references

Thulium perchlorate is an inorganic compound of thulium in the +3 oxidation state and the perchlorate ion, with the formula Tm(ClO_{4})_{3}. It is known in hydrated and anhydrous forms. Anhydrous Tm(ClO_{4})_{3} is polymorphic, with a hexagonal low-temperature phase and a trigonal high-temperature phase.

== Preparation ==
Hydrated thulium perchlorate can be prepared by dissolving thulium(III) oxide in aqueous perchloric acid:

Tm_{2}O_{3} + 6 HClO_{4} → 2 Tm(ClO_{4})_{3} + 3 H_{2}O

A modern Raman study prepared aqueous Tm(ClO_{4})_{3} solutions by dissolving Tm_{2}O_{3} in 6 mol/L perchloric acid.

Anhydrous Tm(ClO_{4})_{3} can be prepared by dehydrating hydrated thulium perchlorate with chlorine oxide dehydrating agents under reduced pressure.

== Properties ==
=== Anhydrous polymorphs ===
Two polymorphs of anhydrous Tm(ClO_{4})_{3} have been characterized.

The low-temperature form crystallizes in the hexagonal crystal system, space group P6_{3}/m (No. 176), with lattice parameters a = 9.211(3) Å, c = 5.563(1) Å and two formula units per unit cell.

It belongs to the same structure family as the anhydrous perchlorates of La through Er. The Tm^{3+} ion is nine-coordinate, with oxygen atoms supplied by tridentate perchlorate groups that link the metal centres into a channel-containing three-dimensional framework.

The high-temperature form crystallizes in the trigonal crystal system, space group R3c (No. 161), with lattice parameters a = 8.13286(2) Å, c = 24.1586(1) Å and six formula units per unit cell.

This structure is closely related to that of anhydrous Lu(ClO_{4})_{3}. In the trigonal phase, the Tm atoms form layers connected through bridging and chelating perchlorate groups.

=== Hydrates ===
A hexahydrate, Tm(ClO_{4})_{3}·6H_{2}O, is a commonly reported hydrated form and has been described as forming green crystals.

The hydrate is readily soluble in water and can serve as a precursor to the anhydrous salt.

=== Aqueous solution ===
In dilute aqueous thulium perchlorate, Tm^{3+} occurs predominantly as the octaaqua ion [Tm(H_{2}O)_{8}]^{3+}.

Raman spectroscopy assigns a strongly polarized band near 391 cm^{−1} to the symmetric Tm–O breathing vibration of [Tm(H_{2}O)_{8}]^{3+}.

Perchlorate behaves mainly as a weakly coordinating counterion in dilute solution, although ion pairing becomes more important at higher concentrations.

== Safety ==
Thulium(III) perchlorate is an oxidizing perchlorate salt and should be kept away from combustible and strongly reducing materials.
