= Thulium iodide =

Thulium iodide may refer to:

- Thulium(II) iodide (thulium diiodide), TmI_{2}
- Thulium(III) iodide (thulium triiodide), TmI_{3}
