= Thulium selenide =

Thulium selenide may refer to:

- Thulium monoselenide, TmSe
- Thulium(III) selenide, Tm_{2}Se_{3}
