= Thulium(III) sulfate =

Chemical compound

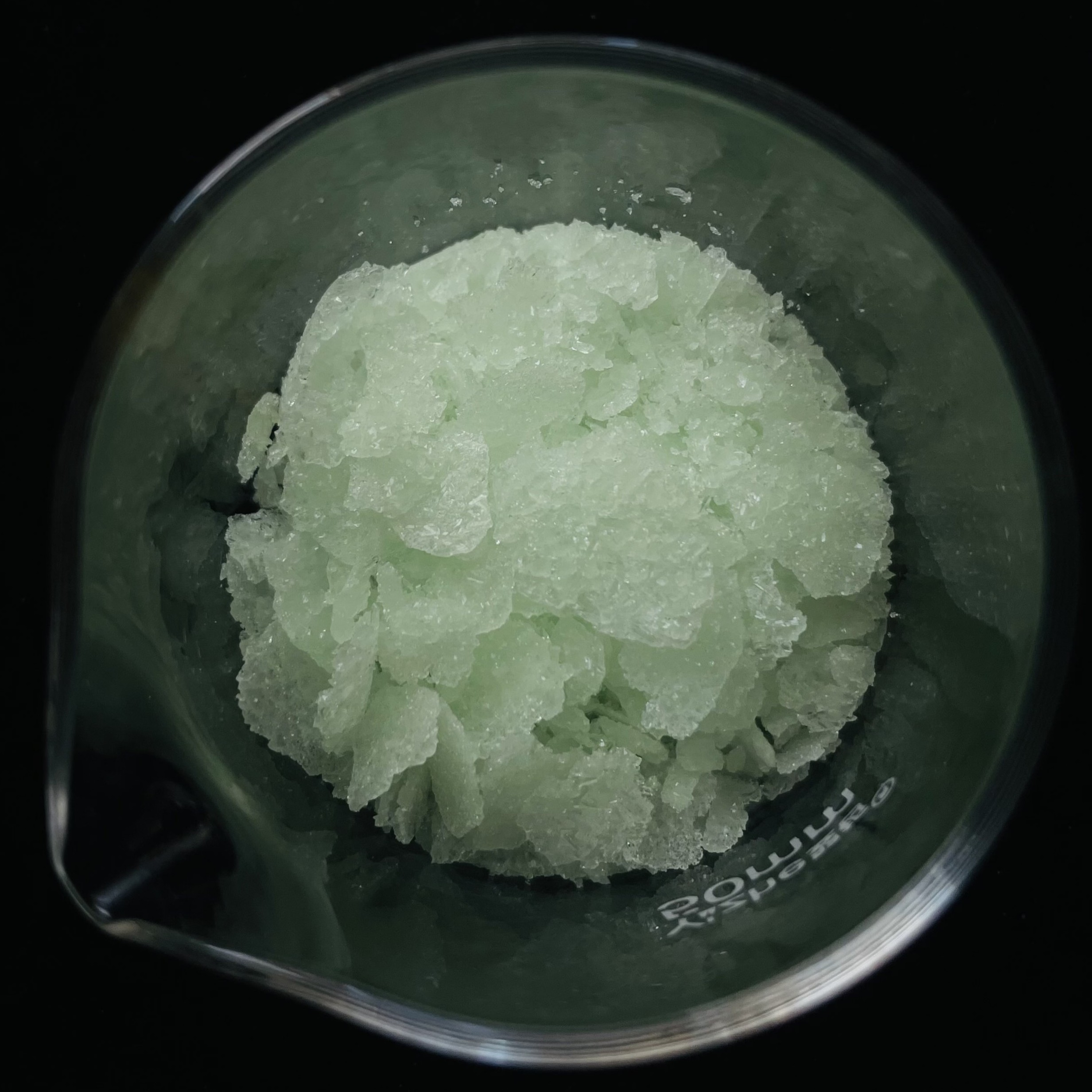

Identifiers
CAS Number	anhydrous: 20731-62-8; octahydrate: 13778-40-0
3D model (JSmol)	anhydrous: Interactive image; monohydrate: Interactive image; octahydrate: Interactive image
ChemSpider	anhydrous: 146895; monohydrate: 17339489; octahydrate: 21242012
ECHA InfoCard	100.039.982
EC Number	anhydrous: 243-996-4; octahydrate: 621-969-1
PubChem CID	anhydrous: 167926; 71310074
UNII	anhydrous: X0HEC0BF2W; octahydrate: 8ZGZ55L20J
CompTox Dashboard (EPA)	anhydrous: DTXSID20890788; octahydrate: DTXSID80746050
- InChI: InChI=1S/3H2O4S.2Tm/c3*1-5(2,3)4;;/h3*(H2,1,2,3,4);;/q;;;2*+3/p-6 Key: NEEAOWXTIOQDFM-UHFFFAOYSA-H; monohydrate: InChI=1S/3H2O4S.H2O.2Tm/c3*1-5(2,3)4;;;/h3*(H2,1,2,3,4);1H2;;/q;;;;2*+3/p-6 Key: UHRIULLMPAUAOV-UHFFFAOYSA-H; octahydrate: InChI=1S/3H2O4S.8H2O.2Tm/c3*1-5(2,3)4;;;;;;;;;;/h3*(H2,1,2,3,4);8*1H2;;/q;;;;;;;;;;;2*+3/p-6 Key: GPBYLGMJMIXKMU-UHFFFAOYSA-H
- SMILES: anhydrous: [O-]S(=O)(=O)[O-].[O-]S(=O)(=O)[O-].[O-]S(=O)(=O)[O-].[Tm+3].[Tm+3]; monohydrate: O.O=S(=O)([O-])[O-].O=S(=O)([O-])[O-].O=S(=O)([O-])[O-].[Tm+3].[Tm+3]; octahydrate: O.O.O.O.O.O.O.O.O=S(=O)([O-])[O-].O=S(=O)([O-])[O-].O=S(=O)([O-])[O-].[Tm+3].[Tm+3]

Properties
Chemical formula	Tm_{2}(SO_{4})_{3}
Molar mass	626.04 g·mol^{−1}
Density	1.130 g/cm^{3} (25 °C)
Solubility in water	160.32 g/L (25 °C)

Hazards
- GHS labelling
Pictograms	(GHS07: Exclamation mark)
Signal word	Warning
Hazard statements	H315, H319, H335
Precautionary statements	P261, P264, P264+P265, P271, P280, P302+P352, P304+P340, P305+P351+P338, P319, P321, P332+P317, P337+P317, P362+P364, P403+P233, P405, P501
- Except where otherwise noted, data are given for materials in their standard state (at 25 °C [77 °F], 100 kPa). Infobox references

Thulium(III) sulfate is an inorganic compound of thulium, with the molecular formula Tm_{2}(SO_{4})_{3}.

It has received little scientific attention as its solubility in water was only determined in 2023 despite the compound being known since at least 1911.

== Preparation ==
Thulium(III) oxide has been reported to react with strong acids with hydrochloric acid being explicitly mentioned. Sulfuric acid is also a strong acid that forms sulfate salts.

Tm_{2}O_{3} + 3 H_{2}SO_{4} → Tm_{2}(SO_{4})_{3} + 3 H_{2}O

== Properties ==
Thulium sulfate can form an octahydrate.

It can also be used as a dopant for e.g. lithium borate glass that contains copper nanoparticles in order to limit photo-darkening or in thermoluminescent dosimeters.

It undergoes ion exchange with barium bromate to yield thulium(III) bromate and barium sulfate which precipitates from the aqueous solution.

Tm_{2}(SO_{4})_{3} + 3 Ba(BrO_{3})_{2} → 2 Tm(BrO_{3})_{3} + 3 BaSO_{4}↓
