= Terbium(III) iodate =

Identifiers
CAS Number	14732-20-8 anhydrous; 54261-47-1 dihydrate
3D model (JSmol)	Interactive image
ChemSpider	20082426
ECHA InfoCard	100.035.252
EC Number	238-793-2
PubChem CID	21149366
CompTox Dashboard (EPA)	DTXSID30163672
- InChI: InChI=1S/3HIO3.Tb/c3*2-1(3)4;/h3*(H,2,3,4);/q;;;+3/p-3 Key: BQNHJSVUMZSXKE-UHFFFAOYSA-K
- SMILES: [O-]I(=O)=O.[O-]I(=O)=O.[O-]I(=O)=O.[Tb+3]

Properties
Chemical formula	Tb(IO_{3})_{3}
Molar mass	683.63
Density	5.735 g·cm^{−3}
- Except where otherwise noted, data are given for materials in their standard state (at 25 °C [77 °F], 100 kPa). Infobox references

Terbium(III) iodate is an inorganic compound with the chemical formula Tb(IO_{3})_{3}. It can be obtained by the reaction of terbium(III) periodate and periodic acid in water at 160 °C, or by the hydrothermal reaction of terbium(III) nitrate or terbium(III) chloride and iodic acid at 200 °C . It crystallizes in the monoclinic crystal system, with space group P2_{1}/c and unit cell parameters a=7.102, b=8.468, c=13.355 Å, β=99.67°.
