= Thulium(III) selenate =

thulium(III) selenate

Identifiers
CAS Number	20148-61-2 anhydrous; 26299-26-3 octahydrate
3D model (JSmol)	Interactive image
- InChI: InChI=1S/3H2O4Se.2Tm/c3*1-5(2,3)4;;/h3*(H2,1,2,3,4);;/q;;;2*+3/p-6 Key: JIJSNYDPFOBPCU-UHFFFAOYSA-H
- SMILES: [Tm+3].[Tm+3].[O-][Se](=O)(=O)[O-].[O-][Se](=O)(=O)[O-].[O-][Se](=O)(=O)[O-]

Properties
Chemical formula	O_{12}Se_{3}Tm_{2}
Molar mass	766.769 g·mol^{−1}
- Except where otherwise noted, data are given for materials in their standard state (at 25 °C [77 °F], 100 kPa). Infobox references

Thulium(III) selenate is an inorganic compound, with the chemical formula Tm_{2}(SeO_{4})_{3}. It can be obtained by reacting a thulium(III) oxide and selenic acid solution and crystallizing it. It crystallises with ammonium selenate in an aqueous solution to obtain NH_{4}Tm(SeO_{4})_{2}·3H_{2}O.

Thulium(III) selenate decomposes at high temperatures and passes through Tm_{2}(SeO_{3})_{3} to finally obtain the oxide Tm_{2}O_{3}.
