= Thulium acetylacetonate =

Names
- IUPAC name Tris(acetylacetonato)thulium(III)
- Systematic IUPAC name Tris[(Z)-4-oxopent-2-en-2-olato-κ^{2}O,O′]thulium(III)
- Other names Thulium(III) acetylacetonate

Identifiers
CAS Number	14589-44-7 anhydrous; trihydrate: 21826-63-1
3D model (JSmol)	Interactive image; trihydrate: Interactive image
ChemSpider	48063949; trihydrate: 22199481
PubChem CID	57369571
CompTox Dashboard (EPA)	DTXSID00724537
- InChI: InChI=1S/3C5H8O2.Tm/c3*1-4(6)3-5(2)7;/h3*3,6H,1-2H3;/q;;;+3/p-3 Key: ASFMKHGVRGERPB-UHFFFAOYSA-K; trihydrate: InChI=1S/3C5H8O2.3H2O.Tm/c3*1-4(6)3-5(2)7;;;;/h3*3,6H,1-2H3;3*1H2;/q;;;;;;+3/p-3/b3*4-3-;;;; Key: UZKSYWPAPWYRSV-VBBOVLQFSA-K
- SMILES: CC(=CC(=O)C)[O-].CC(=CC(=O)C)[O-].CC(=CC(=O)C)[O-].[Tm+3]; trihydrate: CC(=CC(=O)C)[O-].CC(=CC(=O)C)[O-].CC(=CC(=O)C)[O-].[Tm+3].O.O.O

Properties
Chemical formula	C_{15}H_{21}O_{6}Tm
Molar mass	466.261 g·mol^{−1}
Appearance	powder white powder (trihydrate)
- Except where otherwise noted, data are given for materials in their standard state (at 25 °C [77 °F], 100 kPa). Infobox references

Thulium acetylacetonate is a coordination compound with the formula Tm(C_{5}H_{7}O_{2})_{3}. This anhydrous acetylacetonate complex is often discussed but unlikely to exist per se. The 8-coordinated dihydrate Tm(C_{5}H_{7}O_{2})_{3}(H_{2}O)_{2} is a more plausible formula based on the behavior of other lanthanide acetylacetonates. The dihydrate has been characterized by X-ray crystallography. Upon attempted dehydration by heating under vacuum, other hydrated lanthanide tris(acetylacetonate) complexes decompose to give oxo-clusters.

Thulium acetylacetonate can be prepared by the reaction of thulium hydroxide and acetylacetone. Its monohydrate is not volatile. The acetonitrile solution of its dihydrate and the dichloromethane solution of 5-[(4-fluorobenzylidene)amino]-8-hydroxyquinoline (HL) react by heating to obtain the complex [Tm_{4}(acac)_{6}(L)_{6}(μ_{3}-OH)_{2}].

== External reading ==
- Gschneidner, K.A.; Bunzli, J.C.G.; Pecharsky, V.K. (2005). Handbook on the Physics and Chemistry of Rare Earths. ISSN. Elsevier Science. ISBN 978-0-08-046102-1. Archived from the original on 2021-09-16.
