= Thulium(III) hydroxide =

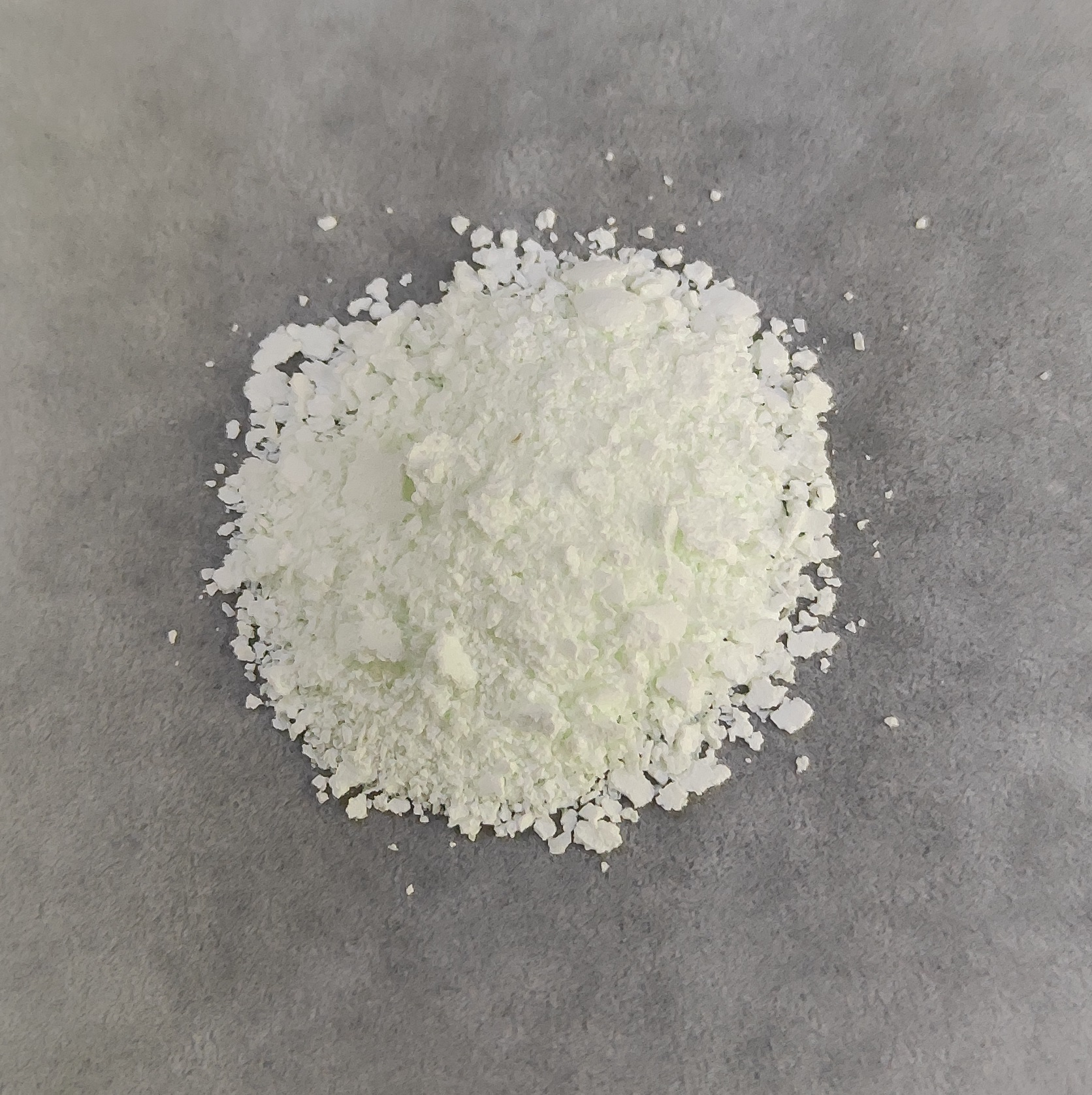

Names
- Other names Thulium hydroxide

Identifiers
| CAS Number | 1311-33-7 |
| 3D model (JSmol) | Interactive image |
| ChemSpider | 66595 |
| ECHA InfoCard | 100.013.810 |
| EC Number | 215-190-2 |
| PubChem CID | 73966 |
| UNII | Q0Q1UR916I |
| CompTox Dashboard (EPA) | DTXSID1061657 |
- InChI: InChI=1S/3H2O.Tm/h3*1H2;/q;;;+3/p-3 Key: VZLHRXBDVXNVPC-UHFFFAOYSA-K
- SMILES: [OH-].[OH-].[OH-].[Tm+3]

Properties
| Chemical formula | Tm(OH)_{3} |
| Molar mass | 219.958 |
| Appearance | green solid |

Related compounds
| Other anions | Thulium oxide |
| Other cations | Erbium(III) hydroxide Ytterbium(III) hydroxide |
- Except where otherwise noted, data are given for materials in their standard state (at 25 °C [77 °F], 100 kPa). Infobox references

Thulium(III) hydroxide is an inorganic compound with the chemical formula Tm(OH)_{3}. It can be prepared by the addition of ammonia solution to a solution containing a soluble thulium salt.

== Chemical properties ==
Thulium(III) hydroxide reacts with acids and produces thulium(III) salts:

Tm(OH)_{3} + 3 H^{+} → Tm^{3+} + 3 H_{2}O

Thulium(III) hydroxide decomposes to TmO(OH) at elevated temperature. Further decomposition produces Tm_{2}O_{3}.

Thulium(III) hydroxide reacts to form thulium acetylacetonate in the presence of absolute ethanol and acetylacetone. The product precipitates upon cooling of the solution.

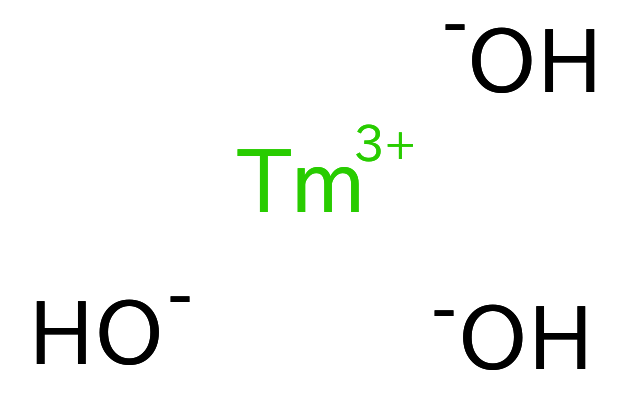
Structure of thulium(III) hydroxide
