= Thulium(III) selenide =

Identifiers
CAS Number	12166-49-3
3D model (JSmol)	Interactive image
ChemSpider	21428676
PubChem CID	25022215
- InChI: InChI=1S/3Se.2Tm/q3*-2;2*+3 Key: TUWAHSUSQXPMCI-UHFFFAOYSA-N
- SMILES: [Se-2].[Se-2].[Se-2].[Tm+3].[Tm+3]

Properties
Chemical formula	Se_{3}Tm_{2}
Molar mass	574.781 g·mol^{−1}
Appearance	light brown or black solid
- Except where otherwise noted, data are given for materials in their standard state (at 25 °C [77 °F], 100 kPa). Infobox references

Thulium(III) selenide is an inorganic compound with the chemical formula Tm_{2}Se_{3}.

== Preparation ==
Thulium(III) selenide can be obtained by the reaction of thulium and selenium:

2 Tm + 3 Se → Tm_{2}Se_{3}

It can also be prepared by reacting thulium oxide and hydrogen selenide at high temperature:

Tm_{2}O_{3} + 3 H_{2}Se → Tm_{2}Se_{3} + 3 H_{2}O

Thulium(III) selenide is also generated in the thermal decomposition of (py)_{3}Tm(SePh)_{3}.

== Preparation ==
In the binary system of thulium(III) selenide and antimony triselenide, TmSb_{3}Se_{6}, Tm_{6}Sb_{8}Se_{21}, TmSbSe_{3} and Tm_{8}Sb_{2}Se_{15} can be formed.
