= Thulium phosphide =

Names
- Other names Phosphanylidynethulium

Identifiers
CAS Number	12037-68-2
3D model (JSmol)	Interactive image
ChemSpider	32816410
EC Number	234-863-1
PubChem CID	82857
CompTox Dashboard (EPA)	DTXSID301313489
- InChI: InChI=1S/P.Tm Key: XSKLKLHDOPCDAC-UHFFFAOYSA-N
- SMILES: P#[Tm]

Properties
Chemical formula	PTm
Molar mass	199.90
Appearance	Crystals
Density	7.62 g/cm^{3}

Structure
Crystal structure	Cubic

Related compounds
Other anions	Thulium nitride Thulium arsenide Thulium antimonide Thulium bismuthide
Other cations	Erbium phosphide Ytterbium phosphide
- Except where otherwise noted, data are given for materials in their standard state (at 25 °C [77 °F], 100 kPa). Infobox references

Thulium phosphide is an inorganic compound of thulium and phosphorus with the chemical formula TmP.

== Synthesis ==
Reaction of thulium metal with phosphorus:

4 Tm + P_{4} → 4 TmP

== Physical properties ==
The dense phosphide film will prevent further reactions inside the metal. After etching gallium arsenide, an epitaxial layer of thulium phosphide can be grown on the surface to obtain a TmP/GaAs heterostructure.

The compound forms crystals of a cubic system, space group Fm3m. TmP crystallizes in a NaCl-type structure at ambient pressure.

== Uses ==
The compound is a semiconductor used in high power, high frequency applications and in lasers and other photo diodes.
