= Thulium monoselenide =

Identifiers
CAS Number	12039-53-1
3D model (JSmol)	Interactive image
ChemSpider	74779
ECHA InfoCard	100.031.711
EC Number	234-896-1
PubChem CID	82871
CompTox Dashboard (EPA)	DTXSID2065208
- InChI: InChI=1S/Se.Tm Key: GFKHZESYKBWHEV-UHFFFAOYSA-N
- SMILES: [Se]=[Tm]

Properties
Chemical formula	TmSe
Molar mass	247.89
Density	9.1 g/cm^{3}
Melting point	2,060 °C (3,740 °F; 2,330 K)

Related compounds
Other anions	TmS; TmTe
Other cations	ErSe; YbSe
Related compounds	Tm_{2}Se_{3}
- Except where otherwise noted, data are given for materials in their standard state (at 25 °C [77 °F], 100 kPa). Infobox references

Thulium monoselenide is a mixed valence compound of selenium and thulium with the chemical formula TmSe.

== Preparation ==
Thulium monoselenide can be prepared by directly reacting thulium and selenium:

Tm + Se → TmSe

== Properties ==
Thulium monoselenide forms reddish-brown cubic crystals, space group Fm3̅m, unit cell parameters a = 0.5640 nm, Z = 4, and a structure similar to that of sodium chloride.

The compound melts congruently at 2060 °C, and at 1100 °C and 1730 °C, phase transitions occur in the compound. The Néel temperature of thulium monoselenide is 1.85–2.8 K.
