= Thulium(II) iodide =

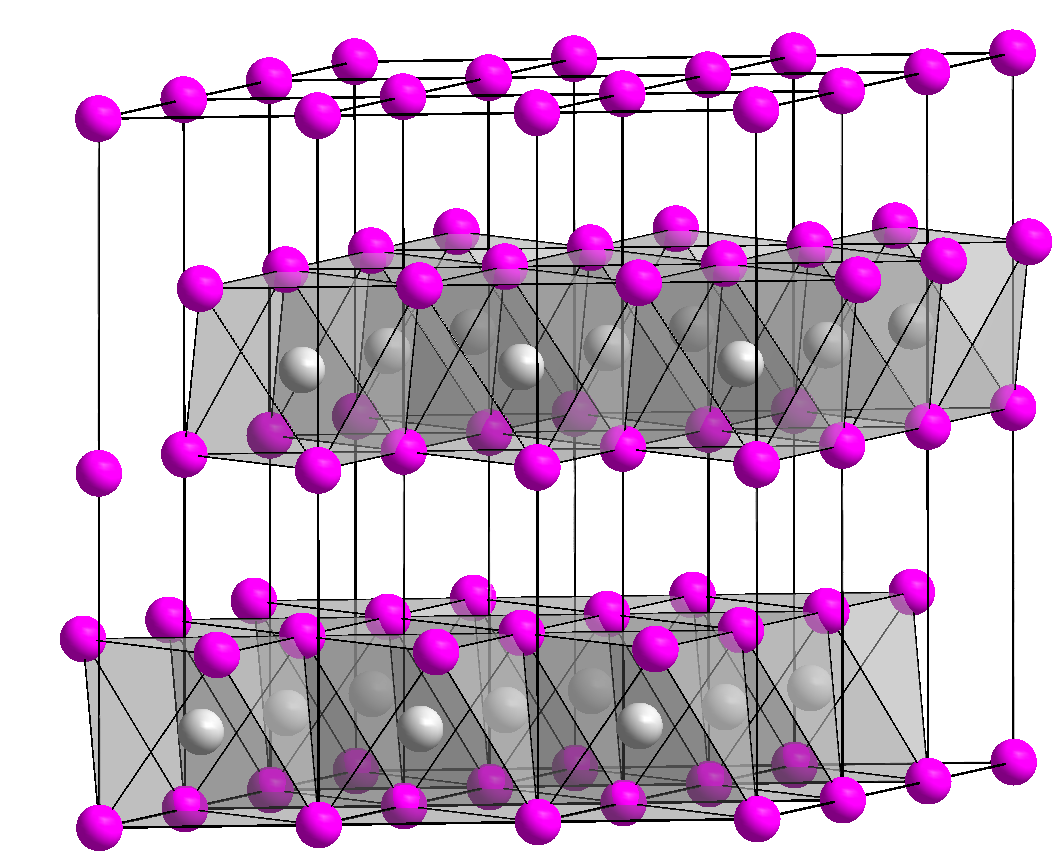

Names
- Other names Thulium diiodide

Identifiers
CAS Number	60864-26-8
3D model (JSmol)	Interactive image
ChemSpider	4401179
ECHA InfoCard	100.151.436
EC Number	622-686-6
PubChem CID	5231385
CompTox Dashboard (EPA)	DTXSID40411818
- InChI: InChI=1S/2HI.Tm/h2*1H;/q;;+2/p-2 Key: XGGRJQVPUOEAEU-UHFFFAOYSA-L
- SMILES: I[Tm]I

Properties
Chemical formula	I_{2}Tm
Molar mass	422.74316 g·mol^{−1}
Appearance	Dark brown hexagonal crystals
- Except where otherwise noted, data are given for materials in their standard state (at 25 °C [77 °F], 100 kPa). Infobox references

Thulium(II) iodide is an inorganic compound with the chemical formula TmI_{2}.

== Preparation and properties ==
Thulium(II) iodide can be obtained by reacting thulium(III) iodide and alkali metals in a tantalum container at 700~800°C. TmI_{2} can be obtained by using lithium and sodium as reducing agents, while potassium, rubidium and caesium can generate the perovskite structure MTmI_{3}. TmI_{2} can also react directly with CsI (340 °C) to generate CsTmI_{3}.

Thulium(II) iodide can also be prepared by reacting thulium and mercury(I) iodide. The reaction process is as follows:

2 Tm + 3 HgI_{2} → 2 TmI_{3} + 3 Hg
Tm + HgI_{2} → TmI_{2} + Hg
Tm + 2 TmI_{3} → 3 TmI_{2}
