= Thulium nitride =

Names
- IUPAC name azanylidynethulium
- Other names Thulium mononitride Thulium(III) nitride

Identifiers
CAS Number	12033-68-0
3D model (JSmol)	Interactive image
ChemSpider	74747
EC Number	234-791-0
PubChem CID	82834
CompTox Dashboard (EPA)	DTXSID6065185
- InChI: InChI=1S/N.Tm Key: PTXUCVLZGJKEFB-UHFFFAOYSA-N
- SMILES: [Tm+3].[N-3]

Properties
Chemical formula	NTm
Molar mass	182.937
Density	9.321 g/cm^{3}

Related compounds
Other anions	TmP; TmAs
Other cations	ErN; YbN
- Except where otherwise noted, data are given for materials in their standard state (at 25 °C [77 °F], 100 kPa). Infobox references

Thulium nitride is a binary inorganic compound of thulium and nitrogen with the chemical formula TmN. It can be prepared by reacting thulium amalgam with nitrogen at high temperature.

== Physical properties ==
Thulium nitride crystallises cubic system with Fm3m space group. It has a sodium chloride structure.

== Chemical properties ==
It reacts with Tm_{2}In at 1220 K to form (Tm_{3}N)In.
