= Lutetium(III) nitrate =

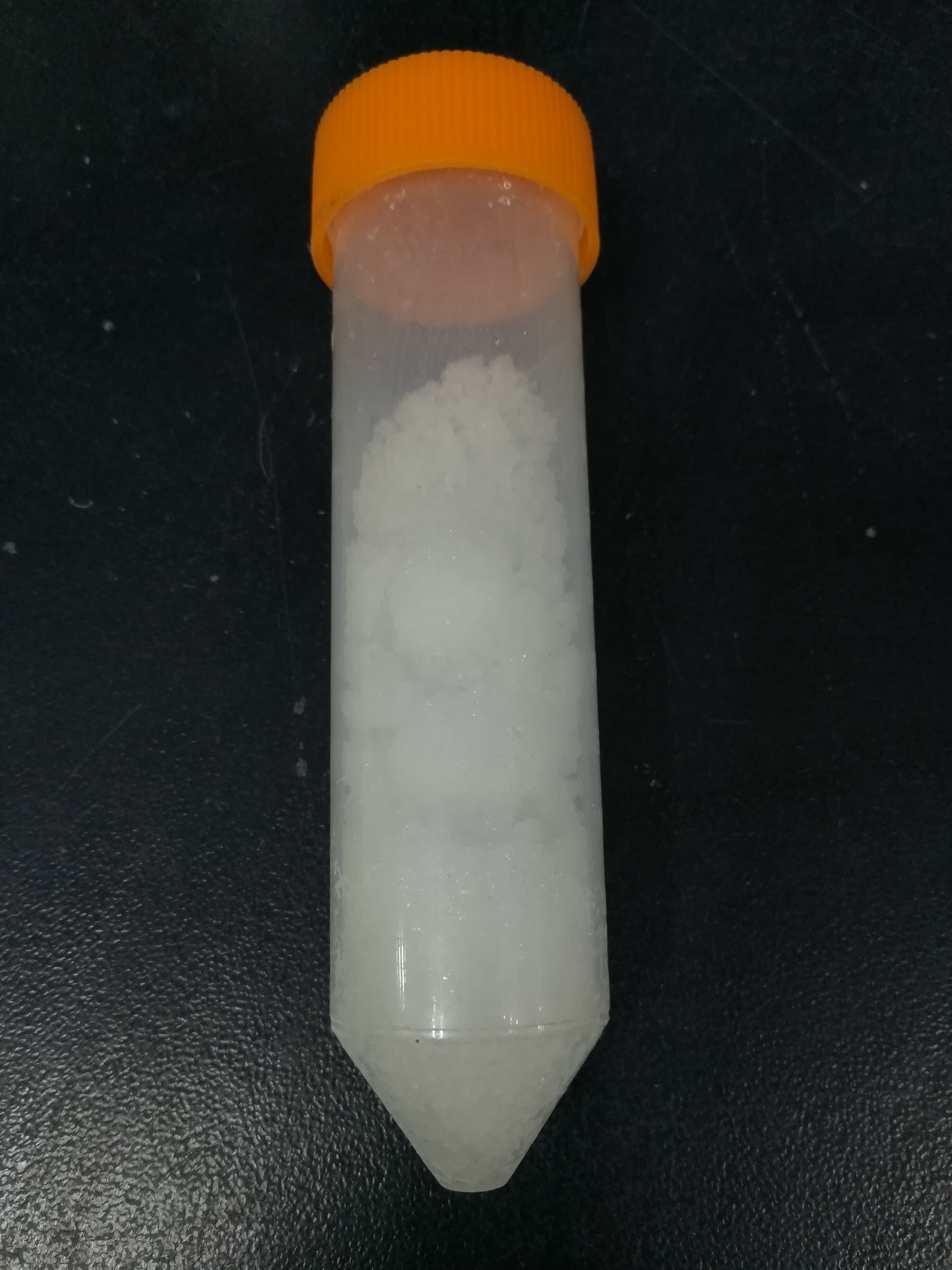

Names
- Other names Lutetium trinitrate, Lutetium nitrate

Identifiers
CAS Number	10099-67-9; monohydrate: 100641-16-5
3D model (JSmol)	Interactive image; trihydrate: Interactive image
ChemSpider	32749148; monohydrate: 17340627
ECHA InfoCard	100.030.206
EC Number	233-241-7
PubChem CID	24920; monohydrate: 16212852; trihydrate: 132279168; hexahydrate: 37480
UNII	N434Y42LL8
CompTox Dashboard (EPA)	DTXSID60890641
- InChI: InChI=1S/Lu.3NO3/c;3*2-1(3)4/q+3;3*-1 Key: APRNQTOXCXOSHO-UHFFFAOYSA-N; trihydrate: InChI=1S/Lu.3NO3.3H2O/c;3*2-1(3)4;;;/h;;;;3*1H2/q+3;3*-1;;; Key: HKTJSOAKUURDRI-UHFFFAOYSA-N
- SMILES: [N+](=O)([O-])[O-].[N+](=O)([O-])[O-].[N+](=O)([O-])[O-].[Lu+3]; trihydrate: [N+](=O)([O-])[O-].[N+](=O)([O-])[O-].[N+](=O)([O-])[O-].O.O.O.[Lu+3]

Properties
Chemical formula	Lu(NO_{3})_{3}
Molar mass	360.98 g/mol
Appearance	Colorless solid
Solubility in water	Soluble

Hazards
- GHS labelling
Signal word	Warning

Related compounds
Related compounds	Terbium(III) nitrate
- Except where otherwise noted, data are given for materials in their standard state (at 25 °C [77 °F], 100 kPa). Infobox references

Lutetium(III) nitrate is an inorganic compound, a salt of lutetium and nitric acid with the chemical formula Lu(NO_{3})_{3}. The compound forms colorless crystals, dissolves in water, and also forms crystalline hydrates. The compound is poisonous.

== Synthesis ==
Dissolving lutetium oxide in nitric acid:

$$\mathsf{ Lu_2O_3 + 6HNO_3 \ \xrightarrow{90^oC}\ 2Lu(NO_3)_3 + 3H_2O }$$

To obtain anhydrous nitrate, the powdered metal is added to nitrogen dioxide dissolved in ethyl acetate:

$$\mathsf{ Lu + 3N_2O_4 \ \xrightarrow{77^oC}\ Lu(NO_3)_3 + 3NO }$$

== Physical properties ==
Lutetium(III) nitrate forms colorless hygroscopic crystals.

Soluble in water and ethanol.

Forms crystalline hydrates of the composition Lu(NO_{3})_{3}•nH_{2}O, where n = 3, 4, 5, 6.

== Chemical properties ==
The hydrated lutetium nitrate thermally decomposes to form LuONO_{3} and decomposes to lutetium oxide upon further heating.

The compound forms ammonium hexafluoroluthenate with ammonium fluoride:

$$\mathsf{ Lu(NO_3)_3 + 6 NH_4F \ \xrightarrow{}\ (NH_4)_3[LuF_6]\downarrow + 3NH_4NO_3 }$$

== Applications ==
Lutetium(III) nitrate is used to obtain metallic lutetium and also as a chemical reagent.

It is used as a component of materials for the production of laser crystals.
