= Thulium chloride =

Thulium chloride may refer to:

- Thulium(II) chloride (thulium dichloride), TmCl_{2}
- Thulium(III) chloride (thulium trichloride), TmCl_{3}
