= Thulium(III) iodide =

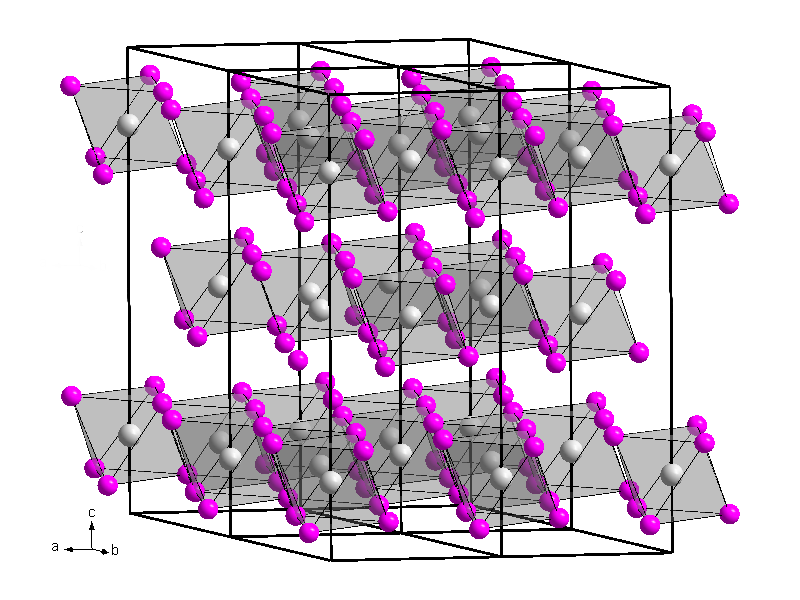

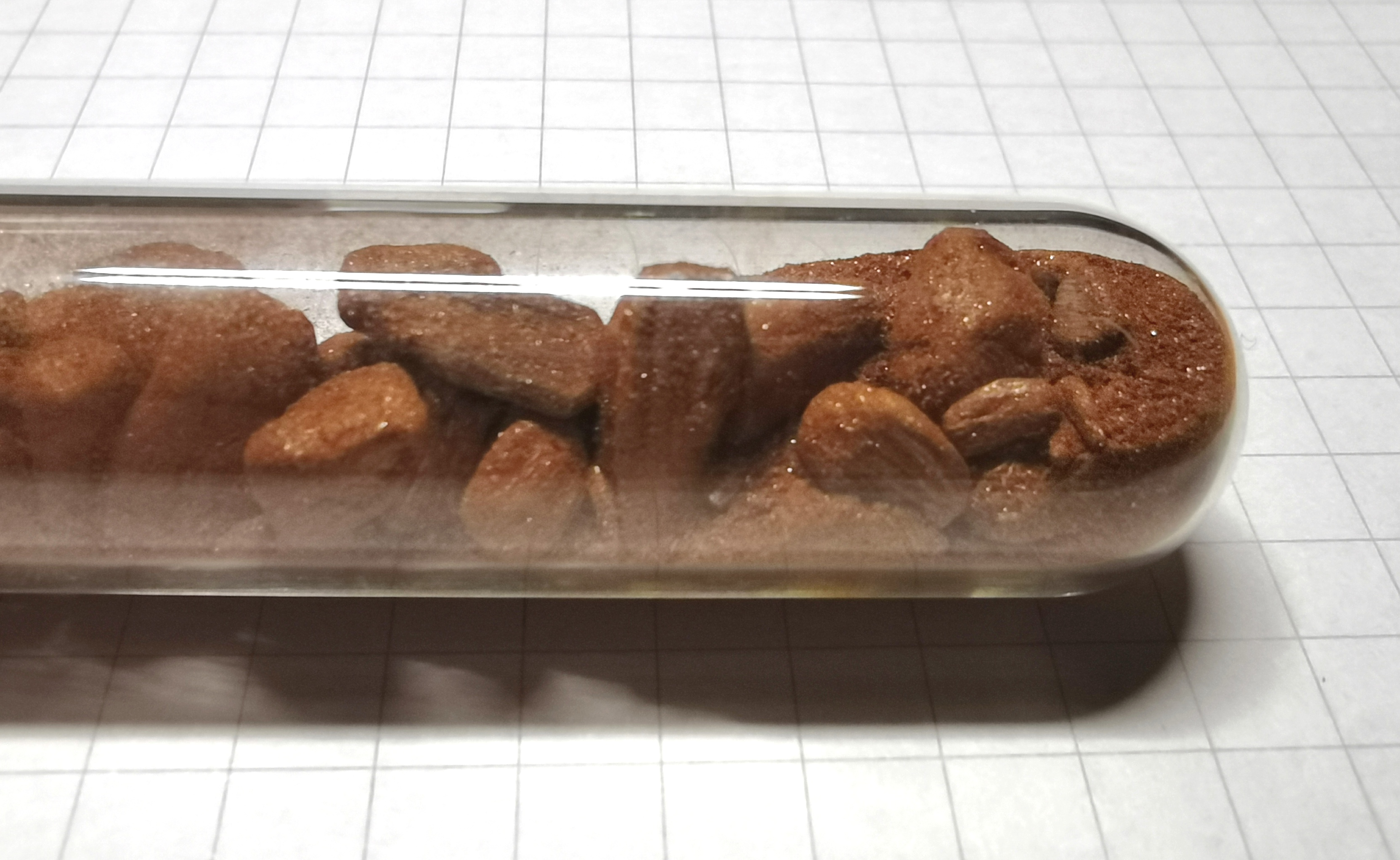

Names
- Other names Thulium iodide Thulium triiodide

Identifiers
CAS Number	13813-43-9
3D model (JSmol)	Interactive image
ChemSpider	75572
ECHA InfoCard	100.034.052
EC Number	237-472-4
PubChem CID	83750
CompTox Dashboard (EPA)	DTXSID5065647
- InChI: InChI=1S/3HI.Tm/h3*1H;/q;;;+3/p-3 Key: LZOMHYVAEHYDST-UHFFFAOYSA-K
- SMILES: I[Tm](I)I

Properties
Chemical formula	TmI_{3}
Appearance	Yellow hexagonal crystal
Melting point	1015 °C
- Except where otherwise noted, data are given for materials in their standard state (at 25 °C [77 °F], 100 kPa). Infobox references

Thulium(III) iodide is an iodide of thulium, with the chemical formula of TmI_{3}. Thulium(III) iodide is used as a component of metal halide lamps.

== Preparation ==
Mercury(II) iodide can be heated with thulium to obtain thulium(III) iodide:

2 Tm + 3 HgI_{2} → 2 TmI_{3} + 3 Hg

The mercury produced in the reaction can be removed by distillation.

The thulium(III) iodide hydrate crystallized from solution can be heated with ammonium iodide to obtain the anhydrous form.

== Properties ==
Thulium(III) iodide is a yellow, highly hygroscopic solid with a bismuth(III) iodide-type crystal structure. It forms in the hexagonal crystal system. Its hydrate can be heated in air to obtain TmOI. Its anhydrous form can be heated with thulium to obtain TmI_{2}:

2 TmI_{3} + Tm → 3 TmI_{2}
