= Terbium(III) nitrate =

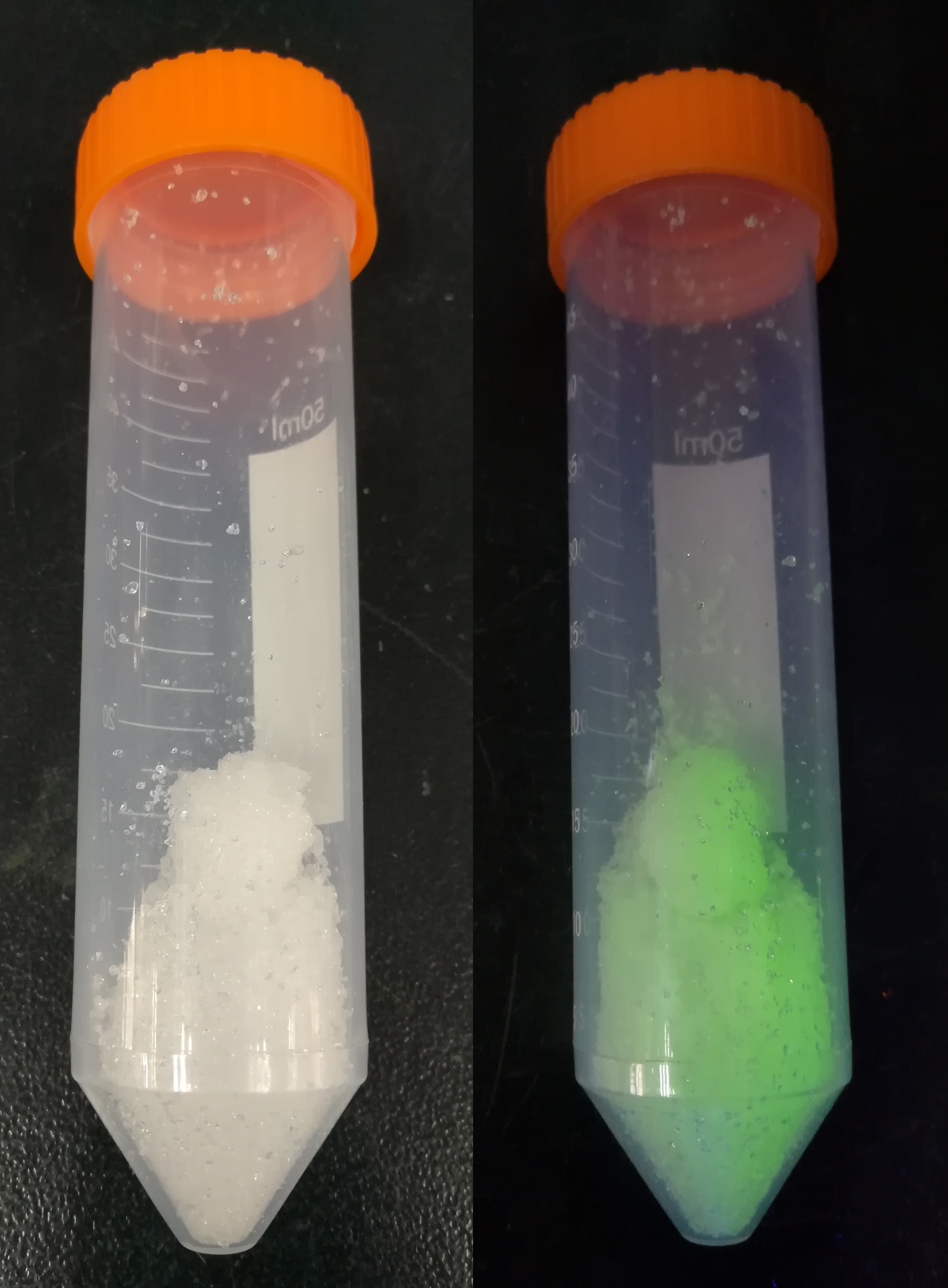
- Hydrate form of terbium nitrate (left) and luminescence under 254 nm UV light (right)

Names
- Other names Terbium nitrate

Identifiers
CAS Number	10043-27-3 (anhydrous); 57584-27-7 (pentahydrate); hexahydrate: 13451-19-9
3D model (JSmol)	Interactive image; hexahydrate: Interactive image
ChemSpider	23236
ECHA InfoCard	100.030.113
EC Number	233-138-7; hexahydrate: 627-823-3
PubChem CID	24853; hexahydrate: 202879
UNII	GVA407Y0IC
CompTox Dashboard (EPA)	DTXSID30890618; hexahydrate: DTXSID10158763
- InChI: InChI=1S/3NO3.Tb/c3*2-1(3)4;/q3*-1;+3 Key: YJVUGDIORBKPLC-UHFFFAOYSA-N; hexahydrate: InChI=1S/3NO3.6H2O.Tb/c3*2-1(3)4;;;;;;;/h;;;6*1H2;/q3*-1;;;;;;;+3 Key: UTCARTSNNKGRTD-UHFFFAOYSA-N
- SMILES: [N+](=O)([O-])[O-].[N+](=O)([O-])[O-].[N+](=O)([O-])[O-].[Tb+3]; hexahydrate: [N+](=O)([O-])[O-].[N+](=O)([O-])[O-].[N+](=O)([O-])[O-].O.O.O.O.O.O.[Tb+3]

Properties
Chemical formula	Tb(NO_{3})_{3}
Molar mass	344.946
Appearance	Colorless crystals (hexahydrate)
- Except where otherwise noted, data are given for materials in their standard state (at 25 °C [77 °F], 100 kPa). Infobox references

Terbium(III) nitrate is an inorganic chemical compound, a salt of terbium and nitric acid, with the formula Tb(NO_{3})_{3}. The hexahydrate crystallizes as triclinic colorless crystals with the formula [Tb(NO_{3})_{3}(H_{2}O)_{4}]·2H_{2}O. It can be used to synthesize materials with green emission.

== Preparation ==
Terbium(III) nitrate can be prepared by dissolving terbium(III,IV) oxide in a mixture of aqueous HNO_{3} and H_{2}O_{2} solution.

Terbium(III) nitrate can be obtained by reacting terbium(III) oxide with nitric acid and crystallizing then drying the crystals with 45~55% sulfuric acid to obtain the hexahydrate.

== Properties ==
It reacts with NH_{4}HCO_{3} to produce Tb_{2}(CO_{3})_{3} along with its basic carbonate. It forms Tb(NO_{3})^{2−}_{5} in CH_{3}CN with excess nitrate anions.
