= Thulium(III) oxide =

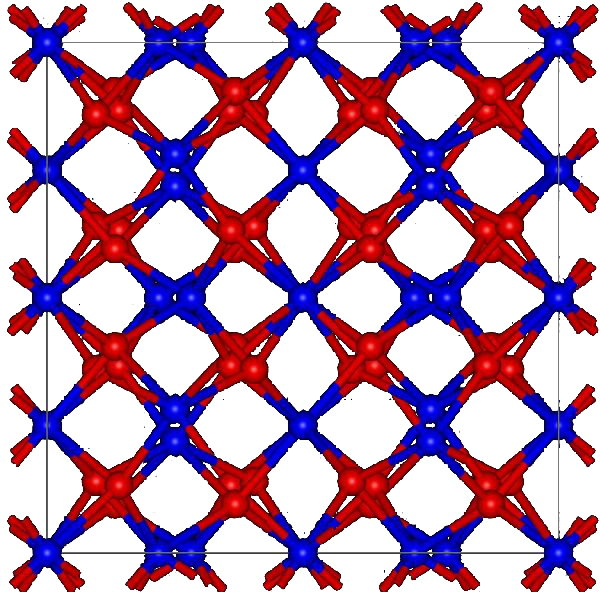
- Thulium(III) oxide

Names
- IUPAC name Thulium(III) oxide
- Other names Thulium oxide, thulium sesquioxide

Identifiers
CAS Number	12036-44-1
3D model (JSmol)	Interactive image
ChemSpider	140188
ECHA InfoCard	100.031.670
EC Number	234-851-6
PubChem CID	159411
UNII	DZJ5EE05EB
CompTox Dashboard (EPA)	DTXSID50894774
- InChI: InChI=1S/3O.2Tm/q3*-2;2*+3
- SMILES: [O-2].[O-2].[O-2].[Tm+3].[Tm+3]

Properties
Chemical formula	Tm_{2}O_{3}
Molar mass	385.866 g/mol
Appearance	greenish-white cubic crystals
Density	8.6 g/cm^{3}
Melting point	2,341 °C (4,246 °F; 2,614 K)
Boiling point	3,945 °C (7,133 °F; 4,218 K)
Solubility	Slightly soluble in acids
Magnetic susceptibility (χ)	+51,444·10^{−6} cm^{3}/mol

Structure
Crystal structure	Cubic, cI80
Space group	Ia-3, No. 206
Lattice constant	a = 10.49 Å
Formula units (Z)	16

Thermochemistry
Heat capacity (C)	2.515 °C_{p} (25 °C)

Hazards
- GHS labelling
Pictograms	(GHS07: Exclamation mark)
Safety data sheet (SDS)	Sigma-Aldrich

Related compounds
Other anions	Thulium(III) chloride
Other cations	Erbium(III) oxide Ytterbium(III) oxide
- Except where otherwise noted, data are given for materials in their standard state (at 25 °C [77 °F], 100 kPa). verify (what is ?) Infobox references

Thulium(III) oxide is a pale green crystalline compound, with the formula Tm_{2}O_{3}. It was first isolated in 1879, from an impure sample of erbia, by Swedish chemist Per Teodor Cleve, who named it thulia.

== Synthesis ==
Thulium(III) oxide has been made in the laboratory using various methods. One method involves burning thulium metal or its various salts in air.

Thulium(III) oxide can be made using a hydrothermal method where thulium(III) acetate is mixed with an ammonia solution, which causes thulium(III) oxide to precipitate as a white solid.

== Properties ==
Thulium(III) oxide is a pale green, thermally stable powder with a high melting point of 2341 °C and a density of 8.6 g/cm^{3}, typically forming a cubic crystal structure. It is resistant to oxidation and dissolves in strong acids like hydrochloric acid, allowing it to form soluble thulium salts. Due to its unique f-electron configuration, Tm_{2}O_{3} has notable optical properties. Thulium oxide is considered fibrogenic; it has the potential to induce tissue injury and fibrosis when inhaled or otherwise introduced to biological tissue.
