= Thulium =

Thulium, _{69}Tm
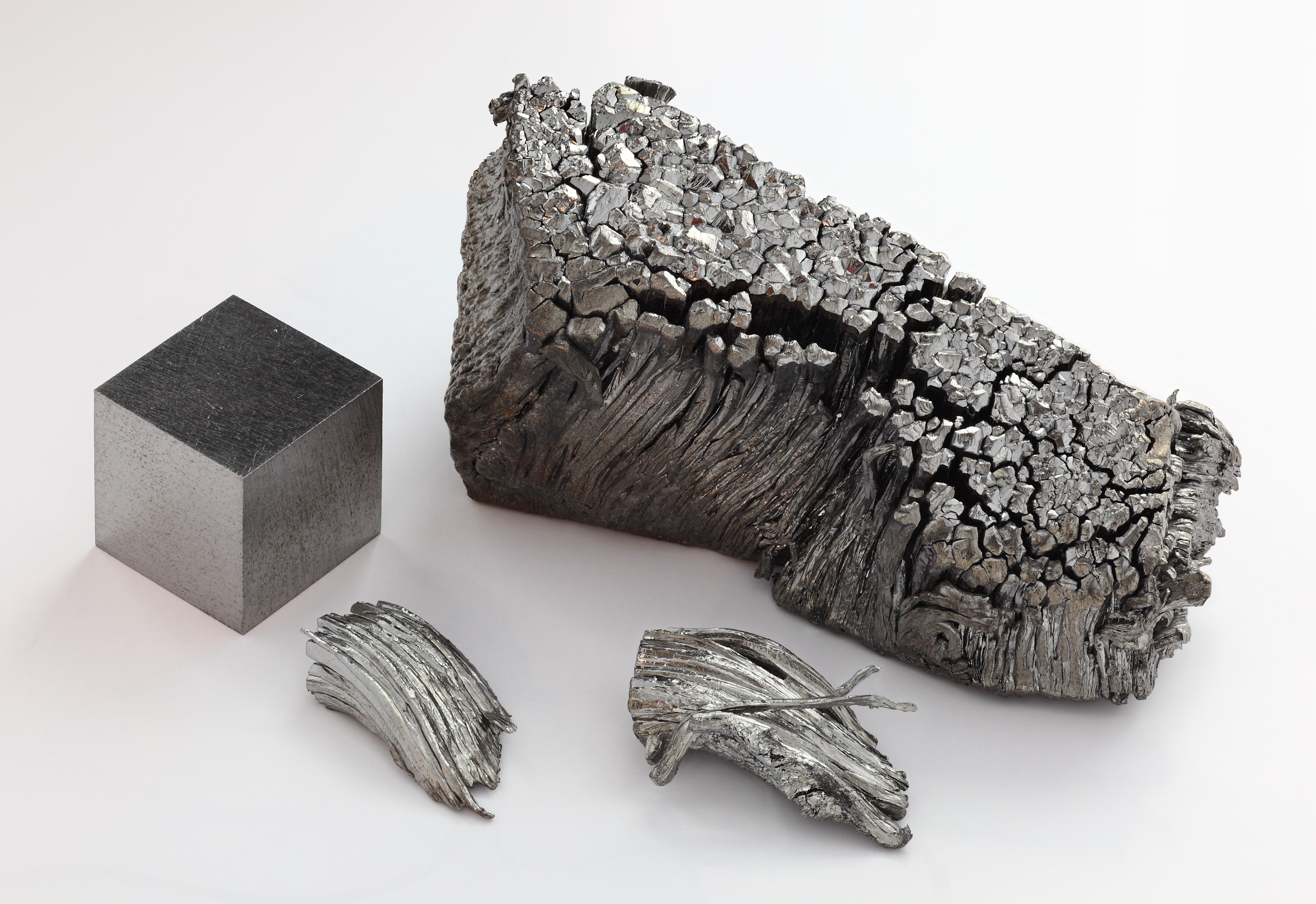

Thulium
- Pronunciation: /ˈθjuːliəm/ (THEW-lee-əm)
- Appearance: silvery gray

Standard atomic weight A_{r}°(Tm)
- 168.934219±0.000005; 168.93±0.01 (abridged)

Thulium in the periodic table
Hydrogen																															Helium
Lithium	Beryllium																									Boron	Carbon	Nitrogen	Oxygen	Fluorine	Neon
Sodium	Magnesium																									Aluminium	Silicon	Phosphorus	Sulfur	Chlorine	Argon
Potassium	Calcium															Scandium	Titanium	Vanadium	Chromium	Manganese	Iron	Cobalt	Nickel	Copper	Zinc	Gallium	Germanium	Arsenic	Selenium	Bromine	Krypton
Rubidium	Strontium															Yttrium	Zirconium	Niobium	Molybdenum	Technetium	Ruthenium	Rhodium	Palladium	Silver	Cadmium	Indium	Tin	Antimony	Tellurium	Iodine	Xenon
Caesium	Barium	Lanthanum	Cerium	Praseodymium	Neodymium	Promethium	Samarium	Europium	Gadolinium	Terbium	Dysprosium	Holmium	Erbium	Thulium	Ytterbium	Lutetium	Hafnium	Tantalum	Tungsten	Rhenium	Osmium	Iridium	Platinum	Gold	Mercury (element)	Thallium	Lead	Bismuth	Polonium	Astatine	Radon
Francium	Radium	Actinium	Thorium	Protactinium	Uranium	Neptunium	Plutonium	Americium	Curium	Berkelium	Californium	Einsteinium	Fermium	Mendelevium	Nobelium	Lawrencium	Rutherfordium	Dubnium	Seaborgium	Bohrium	Hassium	Meitnerium	Darmstadtium	Roentgenium	Copernicium	Nihonium	Flerovium	Moscovium	Livermorium	Tennessine	Oganesson
–
↑
Tm
↓
Md
erbium ← thulium → ytterbium
- Atomic number (Z): 69
- Group: f-block groups (no number)
- Period: period 6
- Block: f-block
- Electron configuration: [Xe] 4f^{13} 6s^{2}
- Electrons per shell: 2, 8, 18, 31, 8, 2

Physical properties
- Phase at STP: solid
- Melting point: 1818 K (1545 °C, 2813 °F)
- Boiling point: 2223 K (1950 °C, 3542 °F)
- Density (at 20° C): 9.320 g/cm^{3}
- when liquid (at m.p.): 8.56 g/cm^{3}
- Heat of fusion: 16.84 kJ/mol
- Heat of vaporization: 191 kJ/mol
- Molar heat capacity: 27.03 J/(mol·K)
- Specific heat capacity: 160.007 J/(kg·K)
Vapor pressure
P (Pa)	1	10	100	1 k	10 k	100 k
at T (K)	1117	1235	1381	1570	(1821)	(2217)

Atomic properties
- Oxidation states: common: +3 +1, +2
- Electronegativity: Pauling scale: 1.25
- Ionization energies: 1st: 596.7 kJ/mol; 2nd: 1160 kJ/mol; 3rd: 2285 kJ/mol
- Atomic radius: empirical: 176 pm
- Covalent radius: 190±10 pm
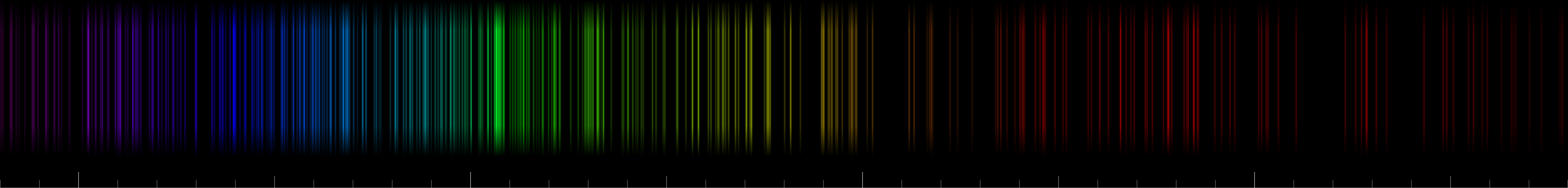
- Spectral lines of thulium

Other properties
- Natural occurrence: primordial
- Crystal structure: hexagonal close-packed (hcp) (hP2)
- Lattice constants: a = 353.77 pm c = 555.39 pm (at 20 °C)
- Thermal expansion: poly: 13.3 µm/(m⋅K) (at r.t.)
- Thermal conductivity: 16.9 W/(m⋅K)
- Electrical resistivity: poly: 676 nΩ⋅m (at r.t.)
- Magnetic ordering: paramagnetic (at 300 K)
- Molar magnetic susceptibility: +25500×10^{−6} cm^{3}/mol (291 K)
- Young's modulus: 74.0 GPa
- Shear modulus: 30.5 GPa
- Bulk modulus: 44.5 GPa
- Poisson ratio: 0.213
- Vickers hardness: 470–650 MPa
- Brinell hardness: 470–900 MPa
- CAS Number: 7440-30-4

History
- Naming: after Thule, a mythical region in Scandinavia
- Discovery: Per Teodor Cleve (1879)
- First isolation: Wilhelm Klemm and Heinrich Bommer (1936)

Isotopes of thulium
Main isotopes			Decay	
Isotope	abundance	half-life (t_{1/2})	mode	product
^{167}Tm	synth	9.25 d	ε	^{167}Er
^{168}Tm	synth	93.1 d	β^{+}	^{168}Er
^{169}Tm	100%	stable		
^{170}Tm	synth	128.6 d	β^{−}	^{170}Yb
^{171}Tm	synth	1.92 y	β^{−}	^{171}Yb

Thulium is a chemical element; it has symbol Tm and atomic number 69. It is the thirteenth element in the lanthanide series of metals. It is the second-least abundant lanthanide in the Earth's crust, after radioactively unstable promethium. It is an easily workable metal with a bright silvery-gray luster. It is fairly soft and slowly tarnishes in air. Despite its high price and rarity, thulium is used as a dopant in solid-state lasers. It has no significant biological role and is not particularly toxic. Artificial radioactive isotopes of thulium are used as radiation sources in some portable X-ray devices.

In 1879, the Swedish chemist Per Teodor Cleve separated two previously unknown components, which he called holmia and thulia, from the rare-earth mineral erbia; these were the oxides of holmium and thulium, respectively. His example of thulium oxide contained impurities of ytterbium oxide. A relatively pure sample of thulium oxide was first obtained in 1911. The metal itself was first obtained in 1936 by Wilhelm Klemm and Heinrich Bommer.

Like the other lanthanides, its most common oxidation state is +3, seen in its oxide, halides and other compounds. In aqueous solution, like compounds of other late lanthanides, soluble thulium compounds form coordination complexes with nine water molecules.

== Properties ==
=== Physical properties ===
Pure thulium metal has a bright, silvery luster, which tarnishes on exposure to air. The metal can be cut with a knife, as it has a Mohs hardness of 2 to 3; it is malleable and ductile. Thulium is ferromagnetic below 32 K, antiferromagnetic between 32 and 56 K, and paramagnetic above 56 K.

Thulium has two major allotropes: the tetragonal α-Tm and the more stable hexagonal β-Tm.

=== Chemical properties ===
Thulium tarnishes slowly in air and burns readily at 150 °C to form thulium(III) oxide:

4 Tm + 3 O_{2} → 2 Tm_{2}O_{3}

Thulium dust can cause explosions and fires.

Thulium is quite electropositive and reacts slowly with cold water and quite quickly with hot water to form thulium hydroxide:

2 Tm(s) + 6 H_{2}O(l) → 2 Tm(OH)_{3}(aq) + 3 H_{2}(g)

Thulium reacts with all the halogens. Reactions are slow at room temperature, but are vigorous above 200 °C:

2 Tm(s) + 3 F_{2}(g) → 2 TmF_{3}(s) (white)
2 Tm(s) + 3 Cl_{2}(g) → 2 TmCl_{3}(s) (yellow)
2 Tm(s) + 3 Br_{2}(g) → 2 TmBr_{3}(s) (white)
2 Tm(s) + 3 I_{2}(g) → 2 TmI_{3}(s) (yellow)

Thulium dissolves readily in dilute sulfuric acid to form solutions containing the pale green Tm(III) ions, which exist as [Tm(OH_{2})_{9}]^{3+} complexes:

2 Tm(s) + 3 H_{2}SO_{4}(aq) → 2 Tm^{3+}(aq) + 3 SO_{4}^{2−}(aq) + 3 H_{2}(aq)

Thulium reacts with various metallic and non-metallic elements forming a range of binary compounds, including TmN, TmS, TmC_{2}, Tm_{2}C_{3}, TmH_{2}, TmH_{3}, TmSi_{2}, TmGe_{3}, TmB_{4}, TmB_{6} and TmB_{12}. Like most lanthanides, the +3 state is most common and is the only state observed in thulium solutions. Thulium exists as a Tm^{3+} ion in solution. In this state, the thulium ion is surrounded by nine molecules of water. Tm^{3+} ions exhibit a bright blue luminescence. Because it occurs late in the series, the +2 oxidation state can also exist, stabilized by the nearly full 4f electron shell, but occurs only in solids.

Thulium's only known oxide is Tm_{2}O_{3}. This oxide is sometimes called "thulia". Reddish-purple thulium(II) compounds can be made by the reduction of thulium(III) compounds. Examples of thulium(II) compounds include the halides (except the fluoride). Some hydrated thulium compounds, such as TmCl_{3}·7H_{2}O and Tm_{2}(C_{2}O_{4})_{3}·6H_{2}O are green or greenish-white. Thulium dichloride reacts very vigorously with water. This reaction results in hydrogen gas and Tm(OH)_{3} exhibiting a fading reddish color. Combination of thulium and chalcogens results in thulium chalcogenides.

Thulium reacts with hydrogen chloride to produce hydrogen gas and thulium chloride. With nitric acid it yields thulium nitrate, Tm(NO_{3})_{3}.

=== Isotopes ===
Natural thulium consists of the single observationally stable isotope thulium-169, which is predicted to undergo alpha decay to holmium-165 with a very long half-life. Known isotopes of thulium range from ^{144}Tm to ^{183}Tm.

The primary decay mode before the stable isotope, ^{169}Tm, is electron capture to erbium isotopes, and the primary mode after is beta emission to ytterbium isotopes. The longest-lived radioisotopes are thulium-171, which has a half-life of 1.92 years, and thulium-170, which has a half-life of 128.6 days. Most other isotopes have half-lives under 10 minutes.

== History ==
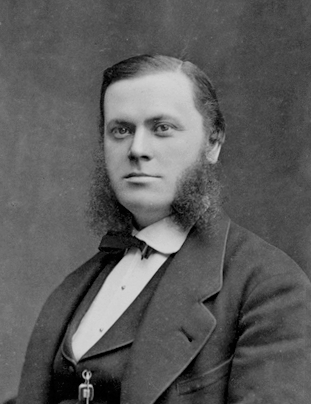
Per Teodor Cleve, the scientist who discovered thulium as well as holmium.

Thulium was discovered by Swedish chemist Per Teodor Cleve in 1879 by looking for impurities in the oxides of other rare earth elements. This was the same method Carl Gustaf Mosander earlier used to discover some other rare earth elements. Cleve started by removing all of the known contaminants of erbia (Er_{2}O_{3}). Upon additional processing, he obtained two new substances; one brown and one green. The brown substance was the oxide of the element holmium and was named holmia by Cleve, and the green substance was the oxide of an unknown element. Cleve named the oxide thulia and its element thulium after Thule, an Ancient Greek place name associated with Scandinavia or Iceland. Thulium's atomic symbol was initially Tu, but later changed to Tm to avoid confusion with tungsten which was commonly written as Tu around the time of thulium's discovery.

Thulium was so rare that none of the early workers had enough of it to purify sufficiently to actually see the green color; they had to be content with spectroscopically observing the strengthening of the two characteristic absorption bands, as erbium was progressively removed. The first researcher to obtain nearly pure thulium was Charles James, a British expatriate working on a large scale at New Hampshire College in Durham, USA. In 1911 he reported his results, having used his discovered method of bromate fractional crystallization to do the purification. He famously needed 15,000 purification operations to establish that the material was homogeneous.

High-purity thulium oxide was first offered commercially in the late 1950s, as a result of the adoption of ion-exchange separation technology. Lindsay Chemical Division of American Potash & Chemical Corporation offered it in grades of 99 % and 99.9 % purity. The price per kilogram oscillated between US$4,600 and $13,300 in the period from 1959 to 1998 for 99.9 % purity, and it was the second highest for the lanthanides behind lutetium.

== Occurrence ==
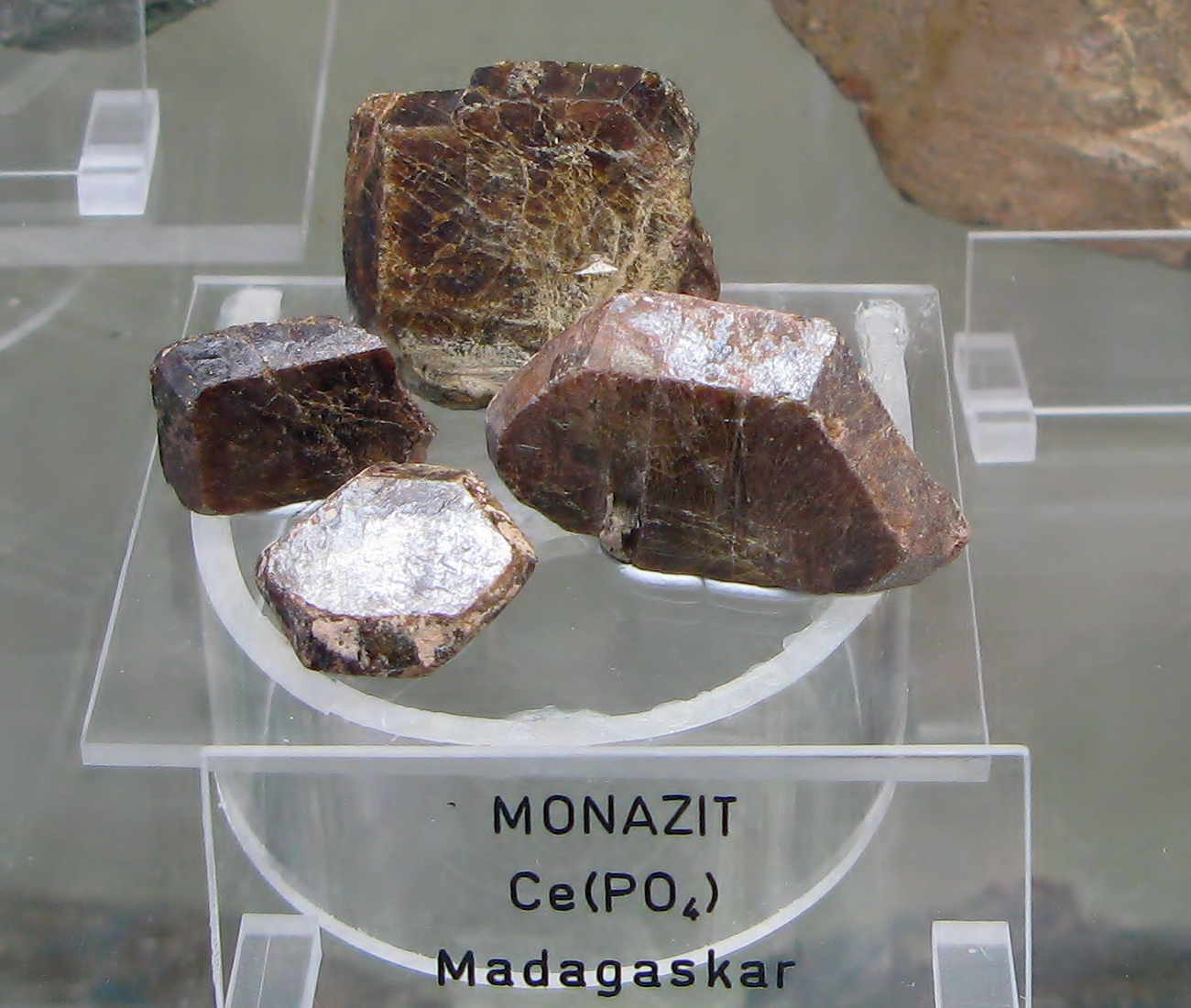
Thulium is found in the mineral monazite

The element is never found in nature in pure form, but it is found in small quantities in minerals with other rare earths. Thulium is often found with minerals containing yttrium and gadolinium. In particular, thulium occurs in the mineral gadolinite. Like many other lanthanides, thulium also occurs in the minerals monazite, xenotime, and euxenite. Thulium has not been found in prevalence over the other rare earths in any mineral yet. Its abundance in the Earth's crust is 0.5 mg/kg by weight.

Thulium makes up approximately 0.5 parts per million of soil, although this value can range from 0.4 to 0.8 parts per million. Thulium makes up 250 parts per quadrillion of seawater. In the Solar System, thulium exists in concentrations of 200 parts per trillion by weight and 1 part per trillion by moles. Thulium ore occurs most commonly in China. Australia, Brazil, Greenland, India, Tanzania, and the United States also have large reserves of thulium. In 2001, the total world reserves of thulium were approximately 100,000 tonnes. Thulium is the least abundant lanthanide on Earth except for the radioactive promethium.

== Production ==
Thulium is principally extracted from monazite ores (~0.007 % thulium) found in river sands, through ion exchange. Newer ion-exchange and solvent-extraction techniques have led to easier separation of the rare earths, which has yielded much lower costs for thulium production. The principal sources today are the ion adsorption clays of southern China. In these, where about two-thirds of the total rare-earth content is yttrium, thulium is about 0.5 % (or about tied with lutetium for rarity).

The metal can be isolated through reduction of its oxide with lanthanum metal or by calcium reduction in a closed container. None of thulium's natural compounds are commercially important. In 2001, approximately 50 tonnes per year of thulium oxide were produced. In 1996, thulium oxide cost US$20 per gram, and in 2005, 99 %-pure thulium metal powder cost US$70 per gram.

== Applications ==
=== Lasers ===
Holmium-chromium-thulium triple-doped yttrium aluminium garnet (Ho:Cr:Tm:YAG, or Ho,Cr,Tm:YAG) is an active laser medium material with high efficiency. It lases at 2080 nm in the infrared and is widely used in military applications, medicine, and meteorology. Single-element thulium-doped YAG (Tm:YAG) lasers operate at 2010 nm. The wavelength of thulium-based lasers is very efficient for superficial ablation of tissue, with minimal coagulation depth in air or in water. This makes thulium lasers attractive for laser-based surgery.

=== X-ray source ===
Despite its high cost, portable X-ray devices use thulium that has been bombarded with neutrons in a nuclear reactor to produce the isotope thulium-170, having a half-life of 128.6 days and five major emission lines of comparable intensity (at 7.4, 51.354, 52.389, 59.4 and 84.253 keV). These radioactive sources have a useful life of about one year, as tools in medical and dental diagnosis, as well as to detect defects in inaccessible mechanical and electronic components. Such sources do not need extensive radiation protection – only a small cup of lead. They are among the most popular radiation sources for use in industrial radiography. Thulium-170 is gaining popularity as an X-ray source for cancer treatment via brachytherapy (sealed source radiation therapy).

=== Others ===
Thulium has been used in high-temperature superconductors similarly to yttrium. Thulium potentially has use in ferrites, ceramic magnetic materials that are used in microwave equipment. Thulium is also similar to scandium in that it is used in arc lighting for its unusual spectrum, in this case, its green emission lines, which are not covered by other elements. Because thulium fluoresces with a blue color when exposed to ultraviolet light, thulium is put into euro banknotes as a measure against counterfeiting.

The blue fluorescence of Tm-doped calcium sulfate has been used in personal dosimeters for visual monitoring of radiation. Tm-doped halides in which Tm is in its 2+ oxidation state are luminescent materials that are proposed for electric power generating windows based on the principle of a luminescent solar concentrator.

== Biological role ==
Soluble thulium salts are mildly toxic, but insoluble thulium salts are completely nontoxic. When injected, thulium can cause degeneration of the liver and spleen and can also cause hemoglobin concentration to fluctuate. Liver damage from thulium is more prevalent in male mice than female mice. Despite this, thulium has a low level of toxicity.

In humans, thulium occurs in the highest amounts in the liver, kidneys, and bones. Humans typically consume several micrograms of thulium per year. The roots of plants do not take up thulium, and the dry matter of vegetables usually contains one part per billion of thulium. Thulium metal has low to moderate toxicity.

== See also ==
- Category:Thulium compounds
