= Lanthanide compounds =

Chemical compounds containing a lanthanide element

Lanthanide compounds are compounds formed by the 15 elements classed as lanthanides. The lanthanides are generally trivalent, although some, such as cerium and europium, are capable of forming compounds in other oxidation states.

== Hydrides ==
Chemical element	La	Ce	Pr	Nd	Pm	Sm	Eu	Gd	Tb	Dy	Ho	Er	Tm	Yb	Lu
Atomic number	57	58	59	60	61	62	63	64	65	66	67	68	69	70	71
Metal lattice (RT)	dhcp	fcc	dhcp	dhcp	dhcp	r	bcc	hcp	hcp	hcp	hcp	hcp	hcp	hcp	hcp
Dihydride	LaH_{2+x}	CeH_{2+x}	PrH_{2+x}	NdH_{2+x}		SmH_{2+x}	EuH_{2} o "salt like"	GdH_{2+x}	TbH_{2+x}	DyH_{2+x}	HoH_{2+x}	ErH_{2+x}	TmH_{2+x}	YbH_{2+x} o, fcc "salt like"	LuH_{2+x}
Structure	CaF_{2}	CaF_{2}	CaF_{2}	CaF_{2}	CaF_{2}	CaF_{2}	*PbCl_{2}	CaF_{2}	CaF_{2}	CaF_{2}	CaF_{2}	CaF_{2}	CaF_{2}		CaF_{2}
metal sub lattice	fcc	fcc	fcc	fcc	fcc	fcc	o	fcc	fcc	fcc	fcc	fcc	fcc	o fcc	fcc
Trihydride	LaH_{3−x}	CeH_{3−x}	PrH_{3−x}	NdH_{3−x}		SmH_{3−x}	EuH_{3−x}	GdH_{3−x}	TbH_{3−x}	DyH_{3−x}	HoH_{3−x}	ErH_{3−x}	TmH_{3−x}		LuH_{3−x}
metal sub lattice	fcc	fcc	fcc	hcp	hcp	hcp	fcc	hcp	hcp	hcp	hcp	hcp	hcp	hcp	hcp
Trihydride properties transparent insulators (color where recorded)	red	bronze to grey	PrH_{3−x} fcc	NdH_{3−x} hcp		golden greenish	EuH_{3−x} fcc	GdH_{3−x} hcp	TbH_{3−x} hcp	DyH_{3−x} hcp	HoH_{3−x} hcp	ErH_{3−x} hcp	TmH_{3−x} hcp		LuH_{3−x} hcp

Lanthanide metals react exothermically with hydrogen to form LnH_{2}, dihydrides. With the exception of Eu and Yb, which resemble the Ba and Ca hydrides (non-conducting, transparent salt-like compounds), they form black pyrophoric, conducting compounds where the metal sub-lattice is face centred cubic and the H atoms occupy tetrahedral sites. Further hydrogenation produces a trihydride which is non-stoichiometric, non-conducting, more salt like. The formation of trihydride is associated with and increase in 8–10% volume and this is linked to greater localization of charge on the hydrogen atoms which become more anionic (H^{−} hydride anion) in character.

== Hydroxides ==
All of the lanthanides form hydroxides, Ln(OH)_{3}. With the exception of lutetium(III) hydroxide, which has a cubic structure, they have the hexagonal UCl_{3} structure. The hydroxides can be precipitated from solutions of Ln^{III}. They can also be formed by the reaction of the sesquioxide, Ln_{2}O_{3}, with water, but although this reaction is thermodynamically favorable it is kinetically slow for the heavier members of the series. Fajans' rules indicate that the smaller Ln^{3+} ions will be more polarizing and their salts correspondingly less ionic. The hydroxides of the heavier lanthanides become less basic, for example Yb(OH)_{3} and Lu(OH)_{3} are still basic hydroxides but will dissolve in hot concentrated NaOH.

== Halides ==
Lanthanide halides
Chemical element	La	Ce	Pr	Nd	Pm	Sm	Eu	Gd	Tb	Dy	Ho	Er	Tm	Yb	Lu
Atomic number	57	58	59	60	61	62	63	64	65	66	67	68	69	70	71
Tetrafluoride		CeF_{4}	PrF_{4}	NdF_{4}					TbF_{4}	DyF_{4}					
Color m.p. °C		white dec	white dec						white dec						
Structure C.N.		UF_{4} 8	UF_{4} 8						UF_{4} 8						
Trifluoride	LaF_{3}	CeF_{3}	PrF_{3}	NdF_{3}	PmF_{3}	SmF_{3}	EuF_{3}	GdF_{3}	TbF_{3}	DyF_{3}	HoF_{3}	ErF_{3}	TmF_{3}	YbF_{3}	LuF_{3}
Color m.p. °C	white 1493	white 1430	green 1395	violet 1374	green 1399	white 1306	white 1276	white 1231	white 1172	green 1154	pink 1143	pink 1140	white 1158	white 1157	white 1182
Structure C.N.	LaF_{3} 9	LaF_{3} 9	LaF_{3} 9	LaF_{3} 9	LaF_{3} 9	YF_{3} 8	YF_{3} 8	YF_{3} 8	YF_{3} 8	YF_{3} 8	YF_{3} 8	YF_{3} 8	YF_{3} 8	YF_{3} 8	YF_{3} 8
Trichloride	LaCl_{3}	CeCl_{3}	PrCl_{3}	NdCl_{3}	PmCl_{3}	SmCl_{3}	EuCl_{3}	GdCl_{3}	TbCl_{3}	DyCl_{3}	HoCl_{3}	ErCl_{3}	TmCl_{3}	YbCl_{3}	LuCl_{3}
Color m.p. °C	white 858	white 817	green 786	mauve 758	green 786	yellow 682	yellow dec	white 602	white 582	white 647	yellow 720	violet 776	yellow 824	white 865	white 925
Structure C.N.	UCl_{3} 9	UCl_{3} 9	UCl_{3} 9	UCl_{3} 9	UCl_{3} 9	UCl_{3} 9	UCl_{3} 9	UCl_{3} 9	PuBr_{3} 8	PuBr_{3} 8	YCl_{3} 6	YCl_{3} 6	YCl_{3} 6	YCl_{3} 6	YCl_{3} 6
Tribromide	LaBr_{3}	CeBr_{3}	PrBr_{3}	NdBr_{3}	PmBr_{3}	SmBr_{3}	EuBr_{3}	GdBr_{3}	TbBr_{3}	DyBr_{3}	HoBr_{3}	ErBr_{3}	TmBr_{3}	YbBr_{3}	LuBr_{3}
Color m.p. °C	white 783	white 733	green 691	violet 682	green 693	yellow 640	grey dec	white 770	white 828	white 879	yellow 919	violet 923	white 954	white dec	white 1025
Structure C.N.	UCl_{3} 9	UCl_{3} 9	UCl_{3} 9	PuBr_{3} 8	PuBr_{3} 8	PuBr_{3} 8	PuBr_{3} 8	6	6	6	6	6	6	6	6
Triiodide	LaI_{3}	CeI_{3}	PrI_{3}	NdI_{3}	PmI_{3}	SmI_{3}	EuI_{3}	GdI_{3}	TbI_{3}	DyI_{3}	HoI_{3}	ErI_{3}	TmI_{3}	YbI_{3}	LuI_{3}
Color m.p. °C		yellow 766	green 738	green 784	green 737	orange 850	dec.	yellow 925	957	green 978	yellow 994	violet 1015	yellow 1021	white dec	brown 1050
Structure C.N.	PuBr_{3} 8	PuBr_{3} 8	PuBr_{3} 8	PuBr_{3} 8		BiI_{3} 6	BiI_{3} 6	BiI_{3} 6	BiI_{3} 6	BiI_{3} 6	BiI_{3} 6	BiI_{3} 6	BiI_{3} 6	BiI_{3} 6	BiI_{3} 6
Difluoride						SmF_{2}	EuF_{2}						TmF_{2}	YbF_{2}	
Color m.p. °C						purple 1417	yellow 1416							grey	
Structure C.N.						CaF_{2} 8	CaF_{2} 8							CaF_{2} 8	
Dichloride				NdCl_{2}		SmCl_{2}	EuCl_{2}			DyCl_{2}			TmCl_{2}	YbCl_{2}	
Color m.p. °C				green 841		brown 859	white 731			black dec.			green 718	green 720	
Structure C.N.				PbCl_{2} 9		PbCl_{2} 9	PbCl_{2} 9			SrBr_{2}			SrI_{2} 7	SrI_{2} 7	
Dibromide				NdBr_{2}		SmBr_{2}	EuBr_{2}			DyBr_{2}			TmBr_{2}	YbBr_{2}	
Color m.p. °C				green 725		brown 669	white 731			black			green	yellow 673	
Structure C.N.				PbCl_{2} 9		SrBr_{2} 8	SrBr_{2} 8			SrI_{2} 7			SrI_{2} 7	SrI_{2} 7	
Diiodide	LaI_{2} metallic	CeI_{2} metallic	PrI_{2} metallic	NdI_{2} high pressure metallic		SmI_{2}	EuI_{2}	GdI_{2} metallic		DyI_{2}			TmI_{2}	YbI_{2}	
Color m.p. °C		bronze 808	bronze 758	violet 562		green 520	green 580	bronze 831		purple 721			black 756	yellow 780	Lu
Structure C.N.	CuTi_{2} 8	CuTi_{2} 8	CuTi_{2} 8	SrBr_{2} 8 CuTi_{2} 8		EuI_{2} 7	EuI_{2} 7	2H-MoS_{2} 6					CdI_{2} 6	CdI_{2} 6	
Ln_{7}I_{12}	La_{7}I_{12}		Pr_{7}I_{12}						Tb_{7}I_{12}						
Sesquichloride	La_{2}Cl_{3}							Gd_{2}Cl_{3}	Tb_{2}Cl_{3}			Er_{2}Cl_{3}	Tm_{2}Cl_{3}		Lu_{2}Cl_{3}
Structure								Gd_{2}Cl_{3}	Gd_{2}Cl_{3}						
Sesquibromide								Gd_{2}Br_{3}	Tb_{2}Br_{3}						
Structure								Gd_{2}Cl_{3}	Gd_{2}Cl_{3}						
Monoiodide	LaI														
Structure	NiAs type														

=== Tetrahalides ===
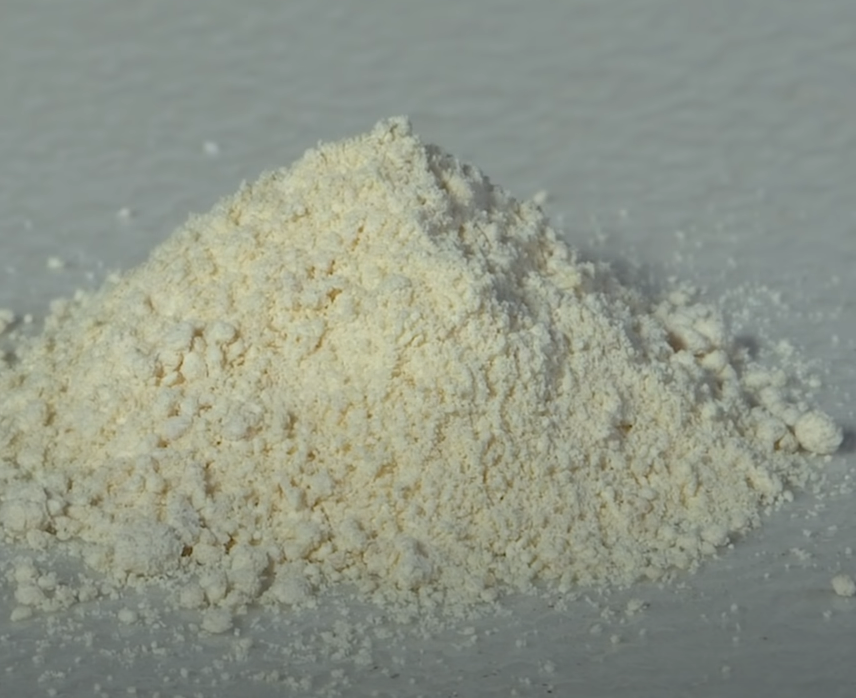
Cerium(IV) fluoride powder

Of the lanthanide tetrahalides, only the fluorides of cerium, praseodymium and terbium are well characterised.

Neodymium(IV) fluoride and dysprosium(IV) fluoride are also known under matrix conditions.

=== Trihalides ===
All lanthanides form trihalides: trifluorides, chlorides, tribromides, and triiodide. They are all dense, high melting solids. The bonding is described as highly ionic. The fluorides are only slightly soluble in water but the others are readily soluble in water. The chlorides, bromides, and iodides are susceptible to hydrolysis, giving lanthanide oxyhalides.

=== Dihalides ===
Some of the dihalides are conducting while the rest are insulators. The conducting forms can be considered as Ln^{III} electride compounds where the electron is delocalised into a conduction band, Ln^{3+} (X^{−})_{2}(e^{−}). All of the diiodides have relatively short metal-metal separations. The CuTi_{2} structure of the lanthanum, cerium and praseodymium diiodides along with HP-NdI_{2} contain 4^{4} nets of metal and iodine atoms with short metal-metal bonds (393-386 La-Pr). these compounds should be considered to be two-dimensional metals (two-dimensional in the same way that graphite is). The salt-like dihalides include those of Eu, Dy, Tm, and Yb. The formation of a relatively stable +2 oxidation state for Eu and Yb is usually explained by the stability (exchange energy) of half filled (f^{7}) and fully filled f^{14}. GdI_{2} possesses the layered MoS_{2} structure, is ferromagnetic and exhibits colossal magnetoresistance.

=== Lower halides ===
The sesquihalides Ln_{2}X_{3} and the Ln_{7}I_{12} compounds listed in the table contain metal clusters, discrete Ln_{6}I_{12} clusters in Ln_{7}I_{12} and condensed clusters forming chains in the sesquihalides. Scandium forms a similar cluster compound with chlorine, Sc_{7}Cl_{12} Unlike many transition metal clusters these lanthanide clusters do not have strong metal-metal interactions and this is due to the low number of valence electrons involved, but instead are stabilised by the surrounding halogen atoms.

LaI is the only known monohalide. Prepared from the reaction of LaI_{3} and La metal, it has a NiAs type structure and can be formulated La^{3+} (I^{−})(e^{−})_{2}.

== Oxides ==
=== Monoxides ===
Europium and ytterbium form salt-like monoxides, EuO and YbO, which have a rock salt structure. EuO is ferromagnetic at low temperatures, and is a semiconductor with possible applications in spintronics. A mixed Eu^{II}/Eu^{III} oxide Eu_{3}O_{4} can be produced by reducing Eu_{2}O_{3} in a stream of hydrogen. Neodymium and samarium also form monoxides, but these are shiny conducting solids, although the existence of samarium monoxide is considered dubious.

=== Sesquioxides ===
La	Ce	Pr	Nd	Pm	Sm	Eu	Gd	Tb	Dy	Ho	Er	Tm	Yb	Lu

All of the lanthanides form sesquioxides, Ln_{2}O_{3}. The lighter (larger) lanthanides adopt a hexagonal 7-coordinate structure while the heavier/smaller ones adopt a cubic 6-coordinate "C-M_{2}O_{3}" structure. All of the sesquioxides are basic, and absorb water and carbon dioxide from air to form carbonates, hydroxides and hydroxycarbonates. They dissolve in acids to form salts.

=== Dioxides ===
Lanthanide dioxides, LnO_{2}, are only formed by Ce, Pr and Tb.

=== Other oxides ===
Praseodymium and terbium also form intermediate-valence oxides of varying stoichiometry. The most stable compound of praseodymium at room temperature is Pr_{6}O_{11} and the most stable of compound of terbium at room temperature is Tb_{4}O_{7}. Cerium can also form intermediate-valence oxides such as Ce_{6}O_{11} and Ce_{4}O_{7}.

== Chalcogenides ==
All of the lanthanides form Ln_{2}Q_{3} (Q= S, Se, Te). The sesquisulfides can be produced by reaction of the elements or (with the exception of Eu_{2}S_{3}) sulfidizing the oxide (Ln_{2}O_{3}) with H_{2}S. The sesquisulfides, Ln_{2}S_{3} generally lose sulfur when heated and can form a range of compositions between Ln_{2}S_{3} and Ln_{3}S_{4}. The sesquisulfides are insulators but some of the Ln_{3}S_{4} are metallic conductors (e.g. Ce_{3}S_{4}) formulated (Ln^{3+})_{3} (S^{2−})_{4} (e^{−}), while others (e.g. Eu_{3}S_{4} and Sm_{3}S_{4}) are semiconductors. Structurally the sesquisulfides adopt structures that vary according to the size of the Ln metal. The lighter and larger lanthanides favoring 7-coordinate metal atoms, the heaviest and smallest lanthanides (Yb and Lu) favoring 6 coordination and the rest structures with a mixture of 6 and 7 coordination.

Polymorphism is common amongst the sesquisulfides. The colors of the sesquisulfides vary metal to metal and depend on the polymorphic form. The colors of the γ-sesquisulfides are La_{2}S_{3}, white/yellow; Ce_{2}S_{3}, dark red; Pr_{2}S_{3}, green; Nd_{2}S_{3}, light green; Gd_{2}S_{3}, sand; Tb_{2}S_{3}, light yellow and Dy_{2}S_{3}, orange. The shade of γ-Ce_{2}S_{3} can be varied by doping with Na or Ca with hues ranging from dark red to yellow, and Ce_{2}S_{3} based pigments are used commercially and are seen as low toxicity substitutes for cadmium based pigments.

All of the lanthanides form monochalcogenides, LnQ, (Q= S, Se, Te). The majority of the monochalcogenides are conducting, indicating a formulation Ln^{III}Q^{2−}(e-) where the electron is in conduction bands. The exceptions are SmQ, EuQ and YbQ which are semiconductors or insulators but exhibit a pressure induced transition to a conducting state. Compounds LnQ_{2} are known but these do not contain Ln^{IV} but are Ln^{III} compounds containing polychalcogenide anions.

Oxysulfides Ln_{2}O_{2}S are well known, they all have the same structure with 7-coordinate Ln atoms, and 3 sulfur and 4 oxygen atoms as near neighbours. Doping these with other lanthanide elements produces phosphors. As an example, gadolinium oxysulfide, Gd_{2}O_{2}S doped with Tb^{3+} produces visible photons when irradiated with high energy X-rays and is used as a scintillator in flat panel detectors. When mischmetal, an alloy of lanthanide metals, is added to molten steel to remove oxygen and sulfur, stable oxysulfides are produced that form an immiscible solid.

== Pnictides ==
=== Nitrides ===
All of the lanthanides form a mononitride, LnN, with the rock salt structure. The mononitrides have attracted interest because of their unusual physical properties. SmN and EuN are reported as being "half metals". NdN, GdN, TbN and DyN are ferromagnetic, SmN is antiferromagnetic. Applications in the field of spintronics are being investigated. CeN is unusual as it is a metallic conductor, contrasting with the other nitrides also with the other cerium pnictides. A simple description is Ce^{4+}N^{3−} (e–) but the interatomic distances are a better match for the trivalent state rather than for the tetravalent state. A number of different explanations have been offered. The nitrides can be prepared by the reaction of lanthanum metals with nitrogen. Some nitride is produced along with the oxide, when lanthanum metals are ignited in air. Alternative methods of synthesis are a high temperature reaction of lanthanide metals with ammonia or the decomposition of lanthanide amides, Ln(NH_{2})_{3}. Achieving pure stoichiometric compounds, and crystals with low defect density has proved difficult. The lanthanide nitrides are sensitive to air and hydrolyse producing ammonia.

=== Other pnictides ===
The other pnictides phosphorus, arsenic, antimony and bismuth also react with the lanthanide metals to form monopnictides, LnQ, where Q = P, As, Sb or Bi. Additionally a range of other compounds can be produced with varying stoichiometries, such as LnP_{2}, LnP_{5}, LnP_{7}, Ln_{3}As, Ln_{5}As_{3} and LnAs_{2}.

== Carbides ==
Carbides of varying stoichiometries are known for the lanthanides. Non-stoichiometry is common. All of the lanthanides form LnC_{2} and Ln_{2}C_{3} which both contain C_{2} units. The dicarbides with exception of EuC_{2}, are metallic conductors with the calcium carbide structure and can be formulated as Ln^{3+}C_{2}^{2−}(e–). The C-C bond length is longer than that in CaC_{2}, which contains the C_{2}^{2−} anion, indicating that the antibonding orbitals of the C_{2}^{2−} anion are involved in the conduction band. These dicarbides hydrolyse to form hydrogen and a mixture of hydrocarbons. EuC_{2} and to a lesser extent YbC_{2} hydrolyse differently producing a higher percentage of acetylene (ethyne).

The sesquicarbides, Ln_{2}C_{3} can be formulated as Ln_{4}(C_{2})_{3}. These compounds adopt the Pu_{2}C_{3} structure which has been described as having C_{2}^{2−} anions in bisphenoid holes formed by eight near Ln neighbours. The lengthening of the C-C bond is less marked in the sesquicarbides than in the dicarbides, with the exception of Ce_{2}C_{3}. Other carbon rich stoichiometries are known for some lanthanides. Ln_{3}C_{4} (Ho-Lu) containing C, C_{2} and C_{3} units; Ln_{4}C_{7} (Ho-Lu) contain C atoms and C_{3} units and Ln_{4}C_{5} (Gd-Ho) containing C and C_{2} units. Metal rich carbides contain interstitial C atoms and no C_{2} or C_{3} units. These are Ln_{4}C_{3} (Tb and Lu); Ln_{2}C (Dy, Ho, Tm) and Ln_{3}C (Sm-Lu).

== Borides ==
=== Diborides ===
Diborides, LnB_{2}, have been reported for Sm, Gd, Tb, Dy, Ho, Er, Tm, Yb and Lu. All have the same, AlB_{2}, structure containing a graphitic layer of boron atoms. Low temperature ferromagnetic transitions for Tb, Dy, Ho and Er. TmB_{2} is ferromagnetic at 7.2 K.

=== Tetraborides ===
Tetraborides, LnB_{4}, have been reported for all of the lanthanides except EuB_{4}, all have the same UB_{4} structure. The structure has a boron sub-lattice consists of chains of octahedral B_{6} clusters linked by boron atoms. The unit cell decreases in size successively from LaB_{4} to LuB_{4}. The tetraborides of the lighter lanthanides melt with decomposition to LnB_{6}. Attempts to make EuB_{4} have failed. The LnB_{4} are good conductors and typically antiferromagnetic.

=== Hexaborides ===
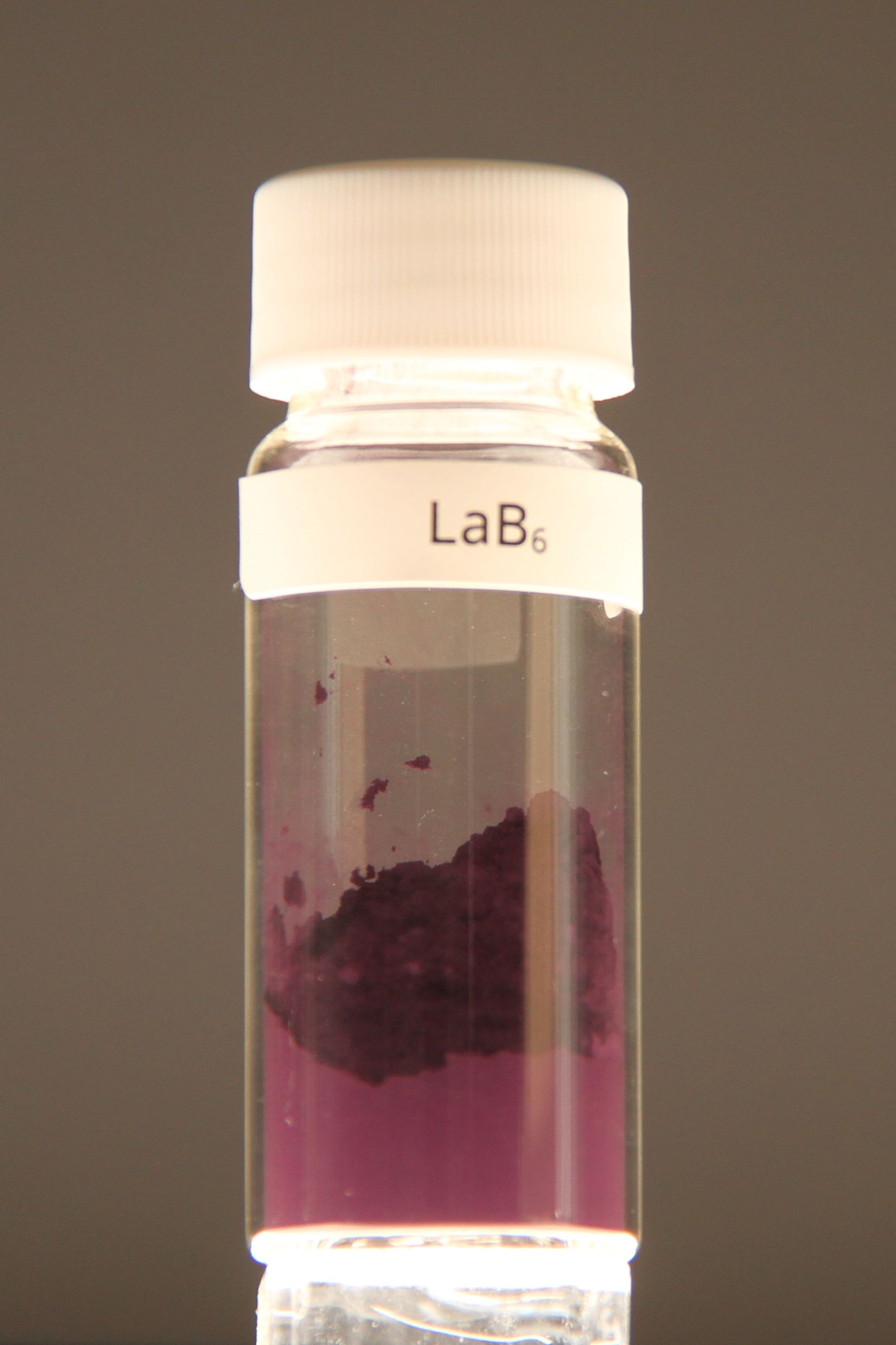
Lanthanum hexaboride

Hexaborides, LnB_{6}, have been reported for all of the lanthanides. They all have the CaB_{6} structure, containing B_{6} clusters. They are non-stoichiometric due to cation defects. The hexaborides of the lighter lanthanides (La – Sm) melt without decomposition, EuB_{6} decomposes to boron and metal and the heavier lanthanides decompose to LnB_{4} with exception of YbB_{6} which decomposes forming YbB_{12}. The stability has in part been correlated to differences in volatility between the lanthanide metals. In EuB_{6} and YbB_{6} the metals have an oxidation state of +2 whereas in the rest of the lanthanide hexaborides it is +3. This rationalises the differences in conductivity, the extra electrons in the Ln^{III} hexaborides entering conduction bands. EuB_{6} is a semiconductor and the rest are good conductors. LaB_{6} and CeB_{6} are thermionic emitters, used, for example, in scanning electron microscopes.

=== Dodecaborides ===
Lanthanide dodecaborides, LnB_{12}, are formed by the heavier smaller lanthanides from Gd to Lu. With the exception YbB_{12} (where Yb takes an intermediate valence and is a Kondo insulator), the dodecaborides are all metallic compounds. They all have the UB_{12} structure containing a 3 dimensional framework of cubooctahedral B_{12} clusters.

=== Higher borides ===
The higher boride LnB_{66} is known for all lanthanide metals. The composition is approximate as the compounds are non-stoichiometric. They all have similar complex structure with over 1600 atoms in the unit cell. The boron cubic sub lattice contains super icosahedra made up of a central B_{12} icosahedra surrounded by 12 others, B_{12}(B_{12})_{12}. Other complex higher borides LnB_{50} (Tb, Dy, Ho, Er, Tm, Lu) and LnB_{25} are known (Gd, Tb, Dy, Ho, Er) and these contain boron icosahedra in the boron framework.

== Organolanthanide compounds ==
Lanthanide-carbon σ bonds are well known; however as the 4f electrons have a low probability of existing at the outer region of the atom there is little effective orbital overlap, resulting in bonds with significant ionic character. As such organo-lanthanide compounds exhibit carbanion-like behavior, unlike the behavior in transition metal organometallic compounds. Because of their large size, lanthanides tend to form more stable organometallic derivatives with bulky ligands to give compounds such as Ln[CH(SiMe_{3})_{3}]. Analogues of uranocene are derived from dilithiocyclooctatetraene, Li_{2}C_{8}H_{8}. Organic lanthanide(II) compounds are also known, such as Cp*_{2}Eu.
