= Europium halide =

Europium halide is a compound of the rare earth metal europium and a halogen. The following compounds are known.

- Europium(II) fluoride
- Europium(III) fluoride
- Europium(II) chloride
- Europium(III) chloride
- Europium(II) bromide
- Europium(III) bromide
- Europium(II) iodide
- Europium(III) iodide
