= Difluoride =

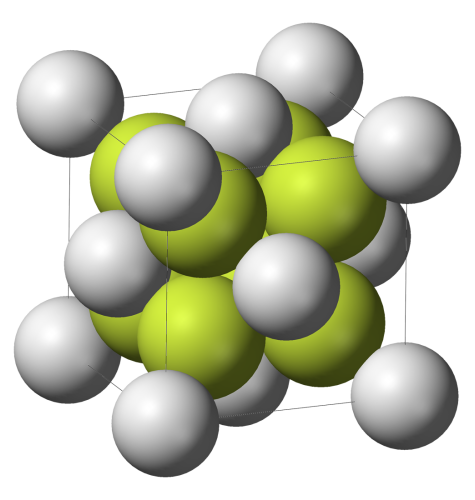
Order and disorder in difluorides
The fluorite structure	Beryllium fluoride glass

Difluorides are chemical compounds with two fluorine atoms per molecule (or per formula unit).

Metal difluorides are all ionic. Despite being highly ionic, the alkaline earth metal difluorides generally have extremely high lattice stability and are thus insoluble in water. The exception is beryllium difluoride. In addition, many transition metal difluorides are water-soluble.

Calcium difluoride is a notable compound. In the form of the mineral fluorite it is the major source of commercial fluorine. It also has an eponymic crystal structure, which is an end member of the spectrum starting from bixbyite and progressing through pyrochlore.

== List of the difluorides ==
Examples of the difluorides include:

=== Alkaline earth metal difluorides ===
The alkaline earth metals all exhibit the oxidation state +2, and form difluorides. The difluoride of radium is however not well established due to the element's high radioactivity.

- Beryllium difluoride
- Magnesium fluoride
- Calcium fluoride
- Strontium difluoride
- Barium fluoride
- Radium fluoride

Solubility-related constants of alkaline earth metal fluorides
Metal	M^{2+} HE	F^{−} HE	"MF_{2}" unit HE	MF_{2} lattice energies (−kJ/mol)	Solubility (mol/L)
Be	2,455	458	3,371	3,526	25
Mg	1,922	458	2,838	2,978	0.0012
Ca	1,577	458	2,493	2,651	0.0002
Sr	1,415	458	2,331	2,513	0.0008
Ba	1,361	458	2,277	2,373	0.006

=== Lanthanide difluorides ===
- Neodymium difluoride
- Samarium difluoride
- Europium difluoride
- Dysprosium difluoride
- Thulium difluoride
- Ytterbium difluoride

=== Transition metal difluorides ===
Compounds of the form MF_{2}:

- Cadmium difluoride
- Chromium(II) fluoride
- Cobalt difluoride
- Copper(II) fluoride
- Iron(II) fluoride
- Manganese(II) fluoride
- Mercury difluoride
- Nickel difluoride
- Palladium difluoride
- Platinum difluoride
- Silver difluoride
- Vanadium difluoride
- Zinc difluoride

=== Post-transition metal difluorides ===
- Lead difluoride
- Tin(II) fluoride

=== Nonmetal and metalloid difluorides ===
- Dinitrogen difluoride
- Oxygen difluoride
- Dioxygen difluoride
- Selenoyl difluoride
- Sulfur difluoride
- Disulfur difluoride
- Thionyl difluoride
- Germanium difluoride

=== Noble gas difluorides ===
- Helium difluoride (hypothetical)
- Argon difluoride (predicted)
- Krypton difluoride
- Xenon difluoride
- Radon difluoride

=== Bifluorides ===
The bifluorides contain the two fluorine atoms in a covalent bonded to a hydrogen atom—the HF_{2}^{−} polyatomic ion—rather than as F^{−} anions.

- Ammonium bifluoride
- Potassium bifluoride
- Sodium bifluoride

=== Organic difluorides ===
- Ethanedioyl difluoride
- Ethylidene difluoride
- Carbonyl difluoride
- Carbon dibromide difluoride (dibromodifluoromethane)
- Carbon dichloride difluoride (dichlorodifluormethane)
- Methyl difluoride
- Methylphosphonyl difluoride
- Polyvinylidene difluoride

== Bibliography ==
- Greenwood, N. N.; Earnshaw, A. (1998). Chemistry of the Elements (second ed.). Butterworth Heinemann. ISBN 0-7506-3365-4.
- Lide, David R. (2004). Handbook of chemistry and physics (84th ed.). CRC Press. ISBN 0-8493-0566-7.
- Wiberg, Egon; Wiberg, Nils; Holleman, Arnold Frederick (2001). Inorganic chemistry. Academic Press. ISBN 978-0-12-352651-9.
