= Lanthanide chlorides =

Chemical compounds between a lanthanide element and chlorine

Structure of [La_{2}(μ-X)_{2}(H_{2}O)_{14}]^{4+} (X = Cl), a representative lanthanide chloride complex.

Lanthanide chlorides are inorganic compounds that contain a lanthanide (Ln) and chloride. The simplest members, the Lanthanide trichlorides, have the formula LnCl_{3}. Important derivatives are the hydrates with the formula LnCl_{3}(H_{2}O)_{n}. Various ether complexes are also well known. Myriad mixed ligand complexes are known.

== Lanthanide(III) and related chlorides ==
The anhydrous solids have melting points range from ca. 582 (Tb) - 925 °C (Lu). They are generally pale colored, often white. As coordination polymers, they only dissolve in donor solvents, including water.

Lanthanide(III) trichlorides and related compounds
| MCl_{3} | color | structure type | f-configuration | hydrate | THF complexes | comments |
|---|---|---|---|---|---|---|
| ScCl_{3} | colorless | AlCl_{3}-type | f^{0} | [Sc(H_{2}O)_{7}]Cl_{3} | ScCl_{3}(THF)_{3} | not classified as a lanthanide usually |
| YCl_{3} | colorless | AlCl_{3}-type | f^{0} | [Y(H_{2}O)_{6}]Cl_{3} | | not classified as a lanthanide usually |
| LaCl_{3} | colorless | UCl_{3}-type | f^{0} | [LaCl(H_{2}O)_{7}]_{2}Cl_{4} | [LaCl_{3}(thf)_{2}] = [La(μ-Cl)_{3}(thf)_{2}]_{n} | diamagnetic |
| CeCl_{3} | colorless | UCl_{3}-type | f^{1}, doublet | [CeCl(H_{2}O)_{7}]_{2}Cl_{4} | [CeCl_{3}(thf)_{2}] = [Ce(μ-Cl)_{2}Cl(thf)_{2}]_{n}; [CeCl_{3}(thf)_{4}]- | |
| PrCl_{3} | green | UCl_{3}-type | f^{2}, triplet | [PrCl_{2}(H_{2}O)_{6}]Cl | [PrCl_{3}(thf)_{2}] = [Pr(μ-Cl)_{2}Cl(thf)_{2}]_{n}- | |
| NdCl_{3} | pink | UCl_{3}-type | f^{3}, quartet | [NdCl_{2}(H_{2}O)_{6}]Cl | [NdCl_{3}(thf)_{4}], [NdCl(μ-Cl)_{2}(thf)_{2}]_{n}, | |
| PmCl_{3} | green | UCl_{3}-type | f^{4}, quintet | | [PmCl_{3}(thf)_{2}]_{n} | radioactive |
| SmCl_{3} | yellow | UCl_{3}-type | f^{5}, sextet | [SmCl_{2}(H_{2}O)_{6}]Cl | [SmCl_{3}(thf)_{4}] | |
| EuCl_{3} | yellow | UCl_{3}-type | f^{6}, septet | [EuCl_{2}(H_{2}O)_{6}]Cl | EuCl_{3}(thf)_{4} | |
| GdCl_{3} | colorless | UCl_{3}-type | f^{7}, octet | [GdCl_{2}(H_{2}O)_{6}]Cl | [GdCl_{3}(thf)_{3.5}] = [GdCl_{2}(thf)_{5}]^{+}[GdCl_{4}(thf)_{2}]^{-}, [GdCl_{3}(thf)_{4}, [GdCl_{3}(thf)2]_{n} | symmetrical electronic shell |
| TbCl_{3} | white | PuBr_{3}-type | f^{8}, septet | [TbCl_{2}(H_{2}O)_{6}]Cl | [TbCl_{3}(thf)_{3·5}] = [TbCl_{2}(thf)_{5}]^{+}[TbCl_{4}(thf)_{2}]^{-} | |
| DyCl_{3} | white | AlCl_{3}-type | f^{9}, sextet | [DyCl_{2}(H_{2}O)_{6}]Cl | [DyCl_{3}(thf)_{3·5}] = [DyCl_{2}(thf)_{5}]^{+}[DyCl_{4}(thf)_{2}]^{-} | |
| HoCl_{3} | yellow | AlCl_{3}-type | f^{10}, quintet | [HoCl_{2}(H_{2}O)_{6}]Cl | [HoCl_{3}(thf)_{3·5}] = [HoCl_{2}(thf)_{5}]^{+}[HoCl_{4}(thf)_{2}]^{-} | |
| ErCl_{3} | violet | AlCl_{3}-type | f^{11}, quartet | [ErCl_{2}(H_{2}O)_{6}]Cl | [ErCl_{3}(thf)_{3·5}] = [ErCl_{2}(thf)_{5}]^{+}[ErCl_{4}(thf)_{2}]^{-} | |
| TmCl_{3} | yellow | AlCl_{3}-type | f^{12}, triplet | [TmCl_{2}(H_{2}O)_{6}]Cl | | |
| YbCl_{3} | colorless | YCl_{3}-type | f^{13}, doublet | [YbCl_{2}(H_{2}O)_{6}]Cl | [YbCl_{3}(thf)_{3·5}] = [YbCl_{2}(thf)_{5}]^{+}[YbCl_{4}(thf)_{2}]^{-}, YbCl_{3}(THF)_{3}, Yb_{2}(μ-Cl)_{2}Cl_{4}(THF)_{4} | |
| LuCl_{3} | colorless | AlCl_{3}-type | f^{14} | [LuCl_{2}(H_{2}O)_{6}]Cl | LuCl_{3}(thf)_{3} | diamagnetic |

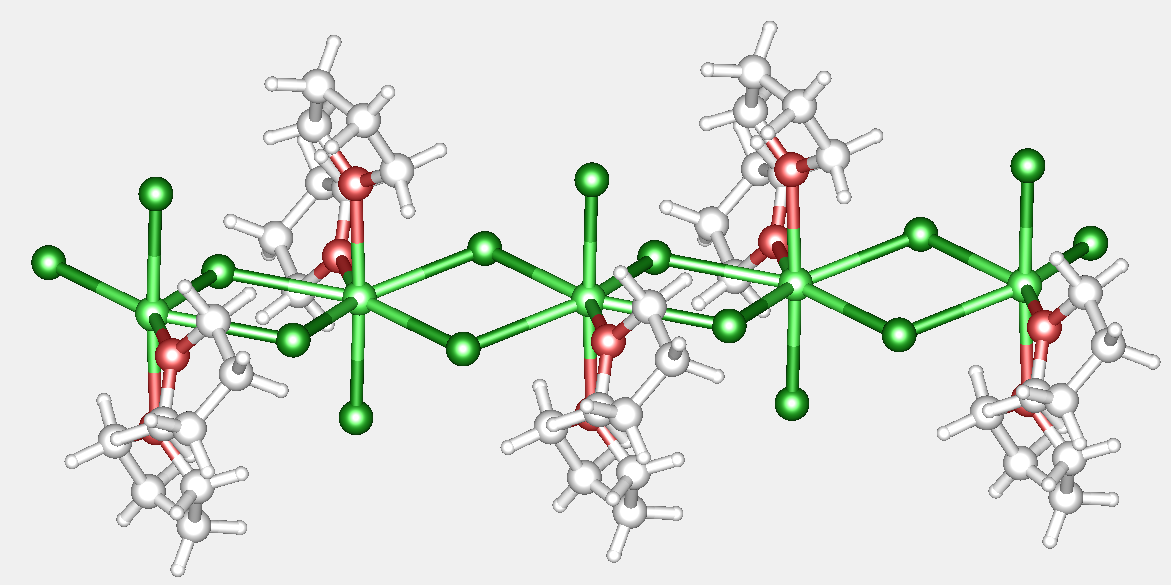
Subunit of PrCl_{3}(tetrahydrofuran)_{2} polymer as determined by X-ray crystallography. Color code: red = O, white = C, green = Cl

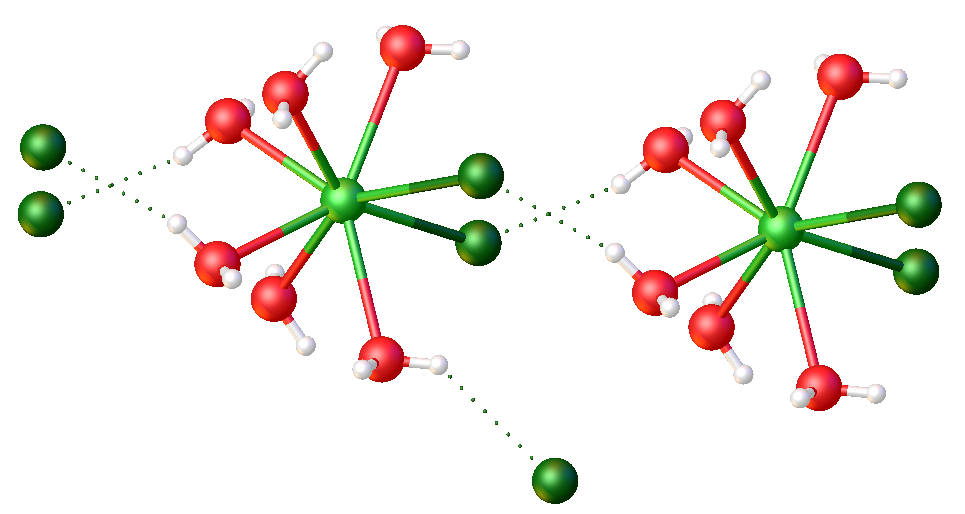
Structure of GdCl_{3}^{.}6H_{2}O, which consists of [GdCl_{2}(H_{2}O)_{6}]^{+} centers. The coordination spheres are interconnected by hydrogen bonds between the protons and both the coordinated and the ionic chlorides.

In terms of their structures, anhydrous trichlorides follow two main motifs, UCl_{3} and YCl_{3}. The UCl_{3} structure features 9-coordinate metal centers. The PuBr_{3} structure, adopted uniquely by TbCl_{3}, features 8-coordinated metals. The remaining later metals are 6-coordinate as is aluminium trichloride.

In the gas phase the trihalides are planar or approximately planar, the lighter lanthanides have a lower % of dimers, the heavier lanthanides a higher proportion. The dimers have a similar structure to Al_{2}Cl_{6}.

== Reactions ==
Lanthanide trichlorides are commercial precursors to the metals by reduction, e.g. with aluminium:

LnCl_{3} + Al → Ln + AlCl_{3}

In some cases, the trifluoride is preferred.

They react with humid air to give oxychlorides:

LnCl_{3} + H_{2}O → LnOCl + 2 HCl

For synthetic chemists, this reaction is a problematic since the oxychlorides are less reactive.

== Preparation ==
The lanthanide oxides and carbonates dissolve in hydrochloric acid to give chloride salt of the hydrated cations:

M_{2}O_{3} + 6 HCl + n H_{2}O → 2 [Ln(H_{2}O)_{n}]Cl_{3}

=== Industrial routes ===
Anhydrous trichlorides are produced commercially by carbothermic reaction of the oxide:

M_{2}O_{3} + 3 Cl_{2} + 3 C → 2 MCl_{3} + 3 CO

=== Ammonium chloride route ===
The ammonium chloride route refers to a general procedure to produce anhydrous lanthanide chlorides. The method has the advantages of being general for the 14 lanthanides and it produces air-stable intermediates that resist hydrolysis. The use of ammonium chloride as a reagent is convenient because the salt is anhydrous, even when handled in air. Ammonium chloride is also attractive because it thermally decomposes to volatile products at temperatures compatible with the stability of the trichloride targets.

Step 1
preparation of ammonium lanthanide chlorides

The reaction of an intimate mixture of lanthanide oxides with excess ammonium chloride produces anhydrous ammonium salts of the penta- and hexachlorides. Typical reaction conditions are hours at 230-250 °C. Some lanthanides (as well as scandium and yttrium) form pentachlorides:

M_{2}O_{3} + 10 NH_{4}Cl → 2 (NH_{4})_{2}MCl_{5} + 3 H_{2}O + 6 NH_{3}

(M = Dy, Ho, Er, Tm, Lu, Yb, Y, Sc)

Tb_{4}O_{7} + 22 NH_{4}Cl → 4 (NH_{4})_{2}TbCl_{5} + 7 H_{2}O + 14 NH_{3}

Other lanthanides for hexachlorides:

M_{2}O_{3} + 12 NH_{4}Cl → 2 (NH_{4})_{3}MCl_{6} + 3 H_{2}O + 6 NH_{3}

(M = La, Ce, Nd, Pm, Sm, Eu, Gd)

These reactions can also start with the metals, e.g.:

Y + 5 NH_{4}Cl → (NH_{4})_{2}YCl_{5} + 1.5 H_{2} + 3 NH_{3}

Step 2
thermolysis of ammonium lanthanide chlorides

The ammonium lanthanum chlorides are converted to the trichlorides by heating in a vacuum. Typical reaction temperatures are 350–400 °C:

(NH_{4})_{2}MCl_{5} → MCl_{3} + 2 HCl + 2 NH_{3}
(NH_{4})_{3}MCl_{6} → MCl_{3} + 3 HCl + 3 NH_{3}

One-pot route

In the preparation of PrCl_{3} from its oxide, intermediates need not be isolated. The proposed stoichiometry follows:

Pr_{_{6}}O_{_{11}} + 22 NH_{4}Cl → 6 PrCl_{3} + 22 NH_{3} + 11 H_{2}O + 2 Cl_{2}

=== Other methods ===
Hydrated lanthanide trichlorides dehydrate under a hot stream of hydrogen chloride.

== Lanthanide dichlorides ==
Examples include neodymium dichloride, samarium dichloride, europium(II) chloride, dysprosium dichloride, thulium dichloride, and ytterbium dichloride. They can be prepared by reducing the trivalent chloride with lithium metal/naphthalene in tetrahydrofuran:

LnCl_{3} + Li → LnCl_{2} + LiCl

Reducing the chloride with the metal or hydrogen is also possible:

2 LnCl_{3} + Ln → 3 LnCl_{2} (Ln=Nd,Sm,Eu?,Dy,Tm,Yb)

2 LnCl_{3} + H_{2} → 2 LnCl_{2} + 2 HCl (Ln=Nd,Sm,Eu,Dy,Tm,Yb)

== See also ==
- Lanthanide
- Chloride
- Lanthanide tribromide
