= Trichloride =

Trichloride may refer to:

- The trichloride ion, a polyhalogen ion
- Actinium trichloride, AcCl_{3}
- Aluminium trichloride, AlCl_{3}
- Americium trichloride, AmCl_{3}
- Antimony trichloride, SbCl_{3} also known as butter of antimony
- Arsenic trichloride, AsCl_{3}, also known as arsenous chloride or butter of arsenic
- Berkelium trichloride, BkCl_{3}
- Bismuth trichloride, BiCl_{3}
- Boron trichloride, BCl_{3}, a colorless gas and valuable reagent in organic synthesis
- Butyltin trichloride, an organotin compound
- Californium trichloride, LaCl_{3}
- Cerium trichloride, CeCl_{3}
- Cobalt trichloride, CoCl_{3}
- Chromium trichloride, CrCl_{3}
- Curium trichloride, CmCl_{3}
- Dysprosium trichloride, DyCl_{3}
- Einsteinium trichloride, EsCl_{3}
- Europium trichloride, EuCl_{3}
- Erbium trichloride, ErCl_{3}
- Gadolinium trichloride, GdCl_{3}
- Gallium trichloride, GaCl_{3}
- Gold trichloride, AuCl_{3}
- Holmium trichloride, HoCl_{3}
- Iodine trichloride, ICl_{3}
- Indium trichloride, InCl_{3}
- Iridium trichloride, IrCl_{3}
- Iron trichloride, FeCl_{3}
- Lanthanum trichloride, LaCl_{3}
- Lanthanide trichloride, LnCl_{3}, a class of chemical compound composed of a lanthanide atom and three chloride atoms.
- Lawrencium trichloride, LrCl_{3}, a compound synthesised in 1969 expected to follow other actinide trichlorides.
- Lutetium trichloride, LuCl_{3}
- Manganese trichloride, MnCl_{3}
- Molybdenum trichloride, MoCl_{3}
- Nitrogen trichloride, NCl_{3}, a yellow, oily, pungent-smelling liquid is most commonly encountered as a byproduct of reactions between ammonia-derivatives and chlorine
- Neodymium trichloride, NdCl_{3}
- Neptunium trichloride, NpCl_{3}
- Niobium trichloride, NbCl_{3}
- Osmium trichloride, OsCl_{3}
- Phosphorus trichloride, PCl_{3}, a yellow solid
- Plutonium trichloride, PuCl_{3}
- Praseodymium trichloride, PrCl_{3}
- Promethium trichloride, PmCl_{3}
- Rhenium trichloride, ReCl_{3}
- Rhodium trichloride, RhCl_{3}
- Ruthenium trichloride, RuCl_{3}
- Samarium trichloride, SmCl_{3}
- Scandium trichloride, ScCl_{3}
- Tantalum trichloride, TaCl_{3}
- Technetium trichloride, TcCl_{3}
- Terbium trichloride, TbCl_{3}
- Thallium trichloride, TlCl_{3}
- Thulium trichloride, TmCl_{3}
- Titanium trichloride, TiCl_{3}
- Tungsten trichloride, WCl_{3}
- Uranium trichloride, UCl_{3}
- Vanadium trichloride, VCl_{3}
- Ytterbium trichloride, YbCl_{3}
- Yttrium trichloride, YCl_{3}
- Zirconium trichloride, ZrCl_{3}
