= Europium iodide =

Europium iodide may refer to:

- Europium(II) iodide (europium diiodide), EuI_{2}
- Europium(III) iodide (europium triiodide), EuI_{3}
