= Europium chloride =

Europium chloride may refer to:

- Europium(III) chloride (europium trichloride), EuCl_{3}
- Europium dichloride (europium(II) chloride), EuCl_{2}
