= Europium fluoride =

Europium fluoride may refer to:

- Europium(II) fluoride (europium difluoride), EuF_{2}
- Europium(III) fluoride (europium trifluoride), EuF_{3}
