= Ytterbium fluoride =

Ytterbium fluoride may refer to:

- Ytterbium(II) fluoride (ytterbium difluoride), YbF_{2}
- Ytterbium(III) fluoride (ytterbium trifluoride), YbF_{3}
