= Samarium(II) fluoride =

Identifiers
CAS Number	15192-17-3
3D model (JSmol)	Interactive image
ChemSpider	4416535
PubChem CID	101282799
CompTox Dashboard (EPA)	DTXSID501313378
- InChI: InChI=1S/2FH.Sm/h2*1H;/p-2 Key: PBDMHCPVUGOGTK-UHFFFAOYSA-L
- SMILES: [F-].[F-].[Sm]

Properties
Chemical formula	SmF_{2}

Structure
Crystal structure	Fluorite structure
Space group	Fm3̅m (No. 225)
Lattice constant	a = 587.10 pm
Formula units (Z)	4

Related compounds
Other anions	Samarium(II) chloride Samarium(II) bromide Samarium(II) iodide
Other cations	Europium(II) fluoride Thulium(II) fluoride Ytterbium(II) fluoride
Related compounds	Samarium(III) fluoride
- Except where otherwise noted, data are given for materials in their standard state (at 25 °C [77 °F], 100 kPa). Infobox references

Samarium(II) fluoride is one of fluorides of samarium with a chemical formula SmF_{2}. The compound crystalizes in the fluorite structure, and is significantly nonstoichiometric. Along with europium(II) fluoride and ytterbium(II) fluoride, it is one of three known rare earth difluorides, the rest are unstable.

== Preparation ==
Samarium(II) fluoride can be prepared by using samarium or hydrogen gas to reduce samarium(III) fluoride:

2 SmF_{3} + Sm → 3 SmF_{2}

2 SmF_{3} + H_{2} → 2 SmF_{2} + 2 HF

== Properties ==
Samarium(II) fluoride is a purple to black solid. This is present in the crystal structure of the cubic calcium fluoride type (space group Fm3̅m; No. 225 with a = 587.7 pm).
