= Neodymium(II) chloride =

Names
- Other names Neodymium dichloride

Identifiers
3D model (JSmol)	Interactive image
ChemSpider	64878486
PubChem CID	57376283
CompTox Dashboard (EPA)	DTXSID701336875
- InChI: InChI=1S/2ClH.Nd/h2*1H;/p-2 Key: YATFJWWYFCCTHZ-UHFFFAOYSA-L
- SMILES: [Cl-].[Cl-].[Nd+2]

Properties
Chemical formula	NdCl_{2}
Molar mass	215.14 g/mol
Appearance	Black solid

Structure
Crystal structure	Orthorhombic
Space group	Pnma, No. 62

Related compounds
Other anions	Neodymium(II) bromide Neodymium(II) iodide
Other cations	SmCl_{2}, EuCl_{2}, DyCl_{2}, TmCl_{2}, YbCl_{2},
- Except where otherwise noted, data are given for materials in their standard state (at 25 °C [77 °F], 100 kPa). Infobox references

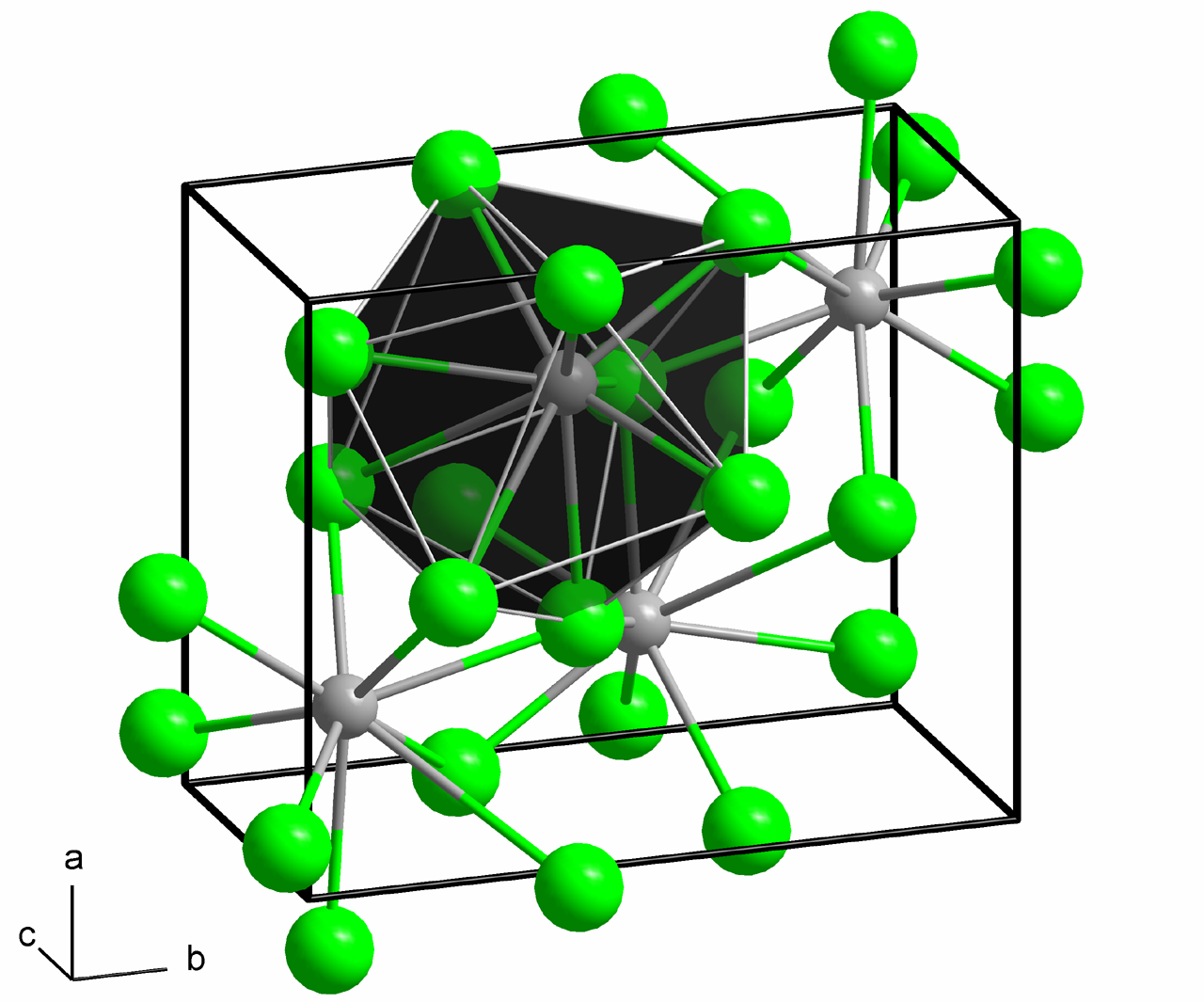
Crystal structure of the mineral cotunnite (lead(II) chloride, PbCl2; orthorhombic, Pnam) with one Pb coordination polyhedron showing the ninefold chlorine coordination sphere.

Neodymium(II) chloride or neodymium dichloride is a chemical compound of neodymium and chlorine with the formula NdCl_{2}.

== Preparation ==
Neodymium(II) chloride can be prepared by reducing neodymium(III) chloride with lithium metal/naphthalene or lithium chloride in THF.

Reduction of neodymium(III) chloride with neodymium metal at temperatures above 650 °C also yields neodymium(II) chloride:

2 NdCl_{3} + Nd → 3 NdCl_{2}

== Structure ==
Neodymium(II) chloride adopts the PbCl_{2} (cotunnite) structure. Each Nd^{2+} ion is coordinated by nine Cl^{−} ions in a tricapped trigonal prismatic arrangement. Seven of the Nd-Cl distances are in the range 2.95-3.14 Å while two are longer at 3.45 Å.
