= Gadolinium(III) iodide =

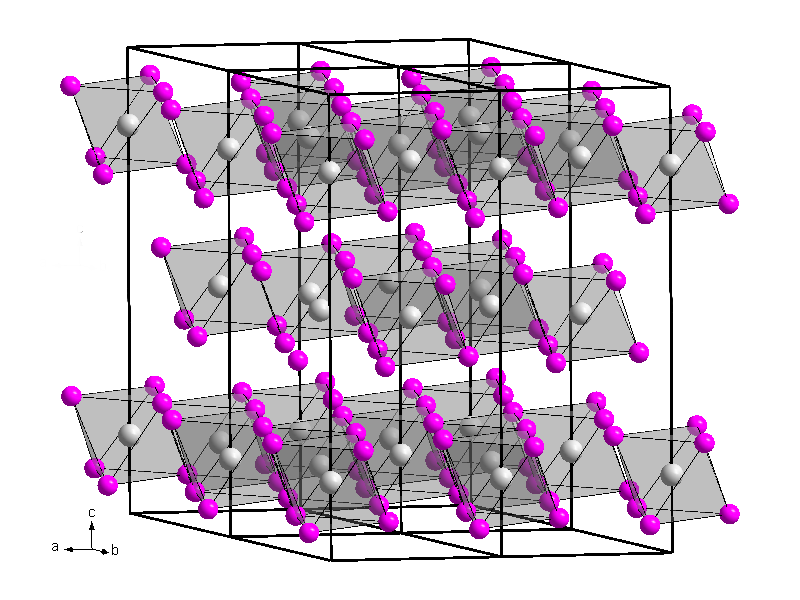

Identifiers
CAS Number	13572-98-0
3D model (JSmol)	Interactive image
ChemSpider	75418
ECHA InfoCard	100.033.619
EC Number	236-997-6
PubChem CID	25212328
CompTox Dashboard (EPA)	DTXSID2065543
- InChI: InChI=1S/Gd.3HI/h;3*1H/q+3;;;/p-3 Key: IZZTUGMCLUGNPM-UHFFFAOYSA-K
- SMILES: [I-].[I-].[I-].[Gd+3]

Properties
Chemical formula	GdI_{3}
Molar mass	537.96 g/mol^{−1}
Appearance	yellow solid
Melting point	926 °C
Boiling point	1340 °C

Hazards
- GHS labelling
Pictograms	(GHS07: Exclamation mark) (GHS08: Health hazard)
Signal word	Danger
Hazard statements	H317, H360
Precautionary statements	P201, P280, P308+P313

Related compounds
Other anions	Gadolinium(III) fluoride Gadolinium(III) chloride Gadolinium(III) bromide
Other cations	Europium(III) iodide Terbium(III) iodide Samarium(III) iodide
Related compounds	Gadolinium(II) iodide
- Except where otherwise noted, data are given for materials in their standard state (at 25 °C [77 °F], 100 kPa). Infobox references

Gadolinium(III) iodide is an iodide of gadolinium, with the chemical formula of GdI_{3}. It is a yellow, highly hygroscopic solid with a bismuth(III) iodide-type crystal structure. In air, it quickly absorbs moisture and forms hydrates. The corresponding oxide iodide is also readily formed at elevated temperature.

== Preparation ==
Gadolinium(III) iodide can be obtained by reacting gadolinium with iodine:

2 Gd + 3 I_{2} → 2 GdI_{3}

It can also be obtained by reacting gadolinium with mercury(II) iodide in a vacuum at 500 °C:

2 Gd + 3 HgI_{2} → 2 GdI_{3} + 3 Hg

Gadolinium(III) iodide can be obtained by the reaction between gadolinium(III) oxide and hydroiodic acid, crystallizing into the hydrate form. The hydrate form can be heated with ammonium iodide to form the anhydrous form.

Gd_{2}O_{3} + 6 HI → 2 GdI_{3} + 3 H_{2}O

== Reactions ==
Gadolinium(III) iodide reacts with gadolinium and zinc in an argon atmosphere heated to 850 °C to obtain Gd_{7}I_{12}Zn. It reacts with gadolinium, carbon, and gadolinium nitride in a tantalum tube at 897 °C to obtain nitrocarbide Gd_{4}I_{6}CN.

== External reading ==
- Asprey, L. B.; Keenan, T. K.; Kruse, F. H. Preparation and crystal data for lanthanide and actinide triiodides. Inorg. Chem., 1964. 3 (8): 1137-1240
