= Europium(III) iodide =

Names
- IUPAC name Europium(III) iodide
- Other names Europium triiodide

Identifiers
CAS Number	13759-90-5
3D model (JSmol)	Interactive image
ChemSpider	23349674
ECHA InfoCard	100.033.941
EC Number	244-721-0
PubChem CID	25210775
CompTox Dashboard (EPA)	DTXSID20929845
- InChI: InChI=1S/Eu.3HI/h;3*1H/q+3;;;/p-3 Key: OEGMUYNEEQNVBV-UHFFFAOYSA-K
- SMILES: [I-].[I-].[I-].[Eu+3]

Properties
Chemical formula	EuI_{3}
Molar mass	532.677 g mol^{−1}
Appearance	colourless crystals
Melting point	decomposes

Structure
Crystal structure	BiI_{3}
Coordination geometry	octahedral

Related compounds
Other anions	EuF_{3}, EuCl_{3}, EuBr_{3}
Other cations	SmI_{3}, GdI_{3}
Related compounds	EuI_{2}
- Except where otherwise noted, data are given for materials in their standard state (at 25 °C [77 °F], 100 kPa). Infobox references

Europium(III) iodide is an inorganic compound, a salt containing europium and iodine with the chemical formula EuI_{3}.

== Preparation ==
Europium metal reacts directly with iodine to form europium(III) iodide:

2 Eu + 3 I_{2} → 2 EuI_{3}

Hydrated europium(III) iodide can be prepared dissolving europium(III) oxide or europium(III) carbonate in hydroiodic acid:

Eu_{2}O_{3} + 6 HI + 6 H_{2}O → 2 EuI_{3}·9H_{2}O

Europium powder reacts with iodine in THF to form a THF adduct of europium(III) iodide:

2 Eu + 3 I_{2} + 7 THF → [EuI_{2}(THF)_{5}][EuI_{4}(THF)_{2}]

The adduct can be formulated more simply as EuI_{3}(THF)_{3.5}.

== Structure ==
Europium(III) iodide adopts the bismuth(III) iodide (BiI_{3}) crystal structure type, with octahedral coordination of each Eu^{3+} ion by 6 iodide ions.

== Reactivity ==
Europium(III) iodide is used as the starting material for two of the main ways of preparing europium(II) iodide:

Reduction with hydrogen gas at 350 °C:

2 EuI_{3} + H_{2} → 2 EuI_{2} + 2 HI

Thermal decomposition at 200 °C, a disproportionation reaction:

2 EuI_{3} → 2 EuI_{2} + 2 I_{2}

Europium(III) iodide nonahydrate, EuI_{3}·9H_{2}O, thermally decomposes to europium(II) iodide dihydrate, EuI_{2}·H_{2}O.
