= Europium(II) bromide =

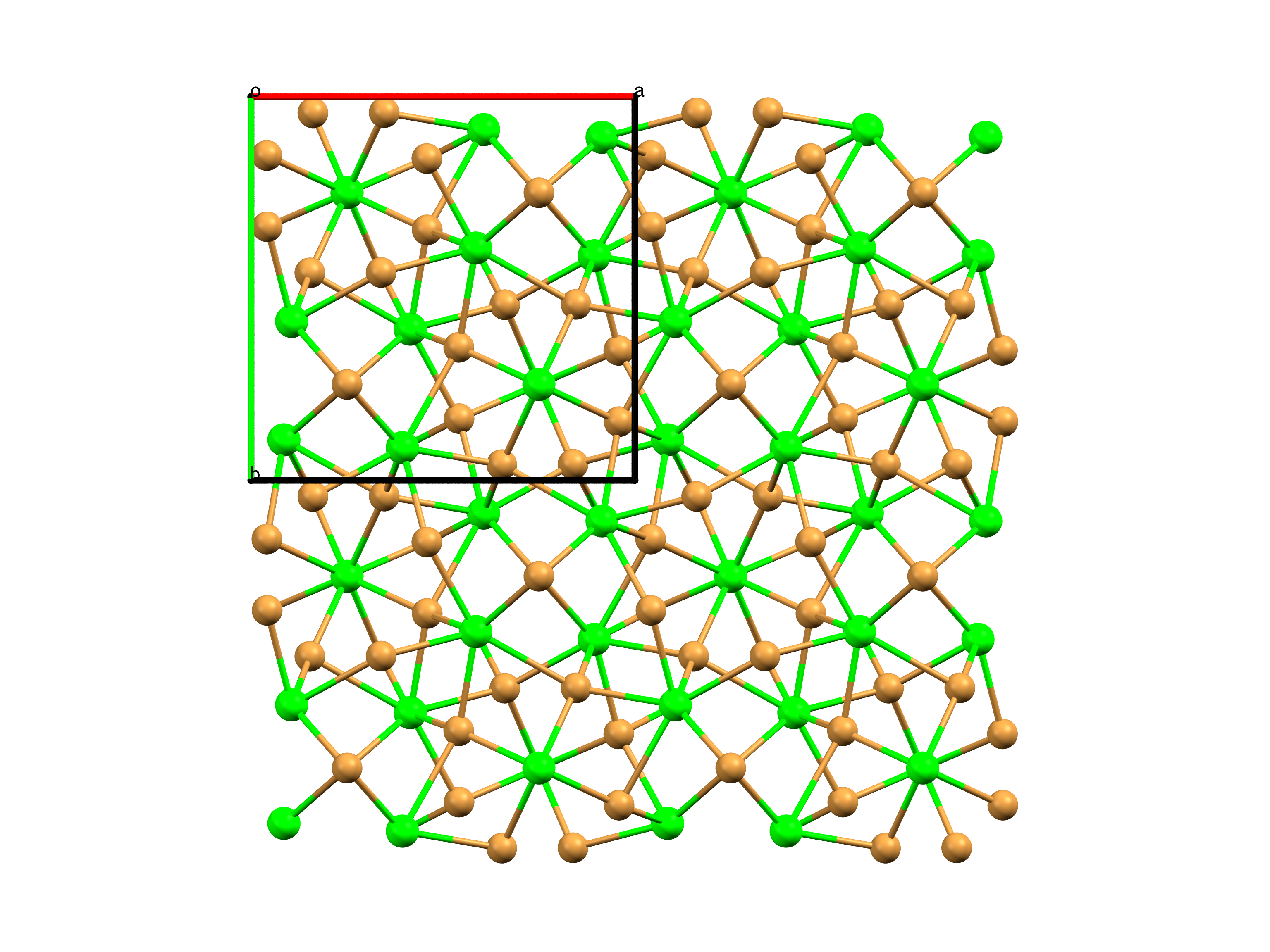

Names
- IUPAC name Europium(II) bromide
- Other names Europium dibromide

Identifiers
CAS Number	13780-48-8
3D model (JSmol)	Interactive image
ChemSpider	123117
ECHA InfoCard	100.206.203
PubChem CID	53249294
CompTox Dashboard (EPA)	DTXSID00160315
- InChI: InChI=1S/2BrH.Eu/h2*1H;/q;;+2/p-2 Key: PJVPGMOCWCUQHP-UHFFFAOYSA-L
- SMILES: Br[Eu]Br

Properties
Chemical formula	EuBr_{2}
Molar mass	311.77g
Appearance	White Crystalline Solid

Structure
Crystal structure	SrBr_{2}
Coordination geometry	Mixed 8 and 7

Hazards
- GHS labelling
Pictograms	(GHS07: Exclamation mark)
Signal word	Warning
Hazard statements	H315, H319
Precautionary statements	P305+P351+P338P264, P280, P302, P313, P321, P332, P337, P352, P362

Related compounds
Other anions	Europium(II) chloride Europium(II) fluoride
Related compounds	Europium(III) bromide
- Except where otherwise noted, data are given for materials in their standard state (at 25 °C [77 °F], 100 kPa). Infobox references

Europium(II) bromide is a crystalline compound of one europium atom and two bromine atoms. Europium(II) bromide is a white powder at room temperature, and odorless. Europium dibromide is hygroscopic.

== Reactions ==
Europium(II) bromide is known to be involved in three reactions:

2 EuBr_{3} + Eu → 3 EuBr_{2} (requires a temperature of 800-900 °C)
2 EuBr_{3} → 2 EuBr_{2} + Br_{2} (requires a temperature of 900-1000 °C)
Eu + HgBr_{2} → EuBr_{2} + Hg (requires a temperature of 700-800 °C)
