= Europium(II) fluoride =

Names
- IUPAC name Europium(II) fluoride
- Other names Europium difluoride

Identifiers
CAS Number	14077-39-5
3D model (JSmol)	Interactive image; Interactive image
ChemSpider	13834724
ECHA InfoCard	100.203.721
PubChem CID	21225127
CompTox Dashboard (EPA)	DTXSID00611473
- InChI: InChI=1S/Eu.2FH/h;2*1H/q+2;;/p-2 Key: YLDGIMHVWSTRML-UHFFFAOYSA-L
- SMILES: F[Eu]F; [F-].[F-].[Eu+2]

Properties
Chemical formula	EuF_{2}
Molar mass	189.96
Appearance	dark yellowish solid
Density	6.495 g·cm^{−3}

Structure
Crystal structure	Fluorite structure
Space group	Fm3̅m (No. 225)
Lattice constant	a = 584.23 pm
Formula units (Z)	4

Hazards
- GHS labelling
Pictograms	(GHS06: Toxic)
Signal word	Danger
Hazard statements	H301
Precautionary statements	P264, P270, P301+P310, P321, P330, P405, P501

Related compounds
Other anions	Europium(II) bromide Europium(II) chloride Europium(II) iodide
Other cations	Samarium(II) fluoride Thulium(II) fluoride Ytterbium(II) fluoride
Related compounds	Europium(III) fluoride
- Except where otherwise noted, data are given for materials in their standard state (at 25 °C [77 °F], 100 kPa). Infobox references

Europium(II) fluoride is an inorganic compound with a chemical formula EuF_{2}. It was first synthesized in 1937.

== Production ==
Europium(II) fluoride can be produced by reducing europium(III) fluoride with metallic europium or hydrogen gas.

$$\mathrm{2 \ EuF_3 + Eu \longrightarrow 3 \ EuF_2}$$
$$\mathrm{2 \ EuF_3 + H_2 \longrightarrow 2 \ EuF_2 + 2 \ HF}$$

== Properties ==
Europium(II) fluoride is a bright yellowish solid with a fluorite structure.

EuF_{2} can be used to dope a trivalent rare-earth fluoride, such as LaF_{3}, to create a vacancy-filled structure with increased conductivity over a pure crystal. Such a crystal can be used as a fluoride-specific semipermeable membrane in a fluoride selective electrode to detect trace quantities of fluoride.
