= Samarium(III) fluoride =

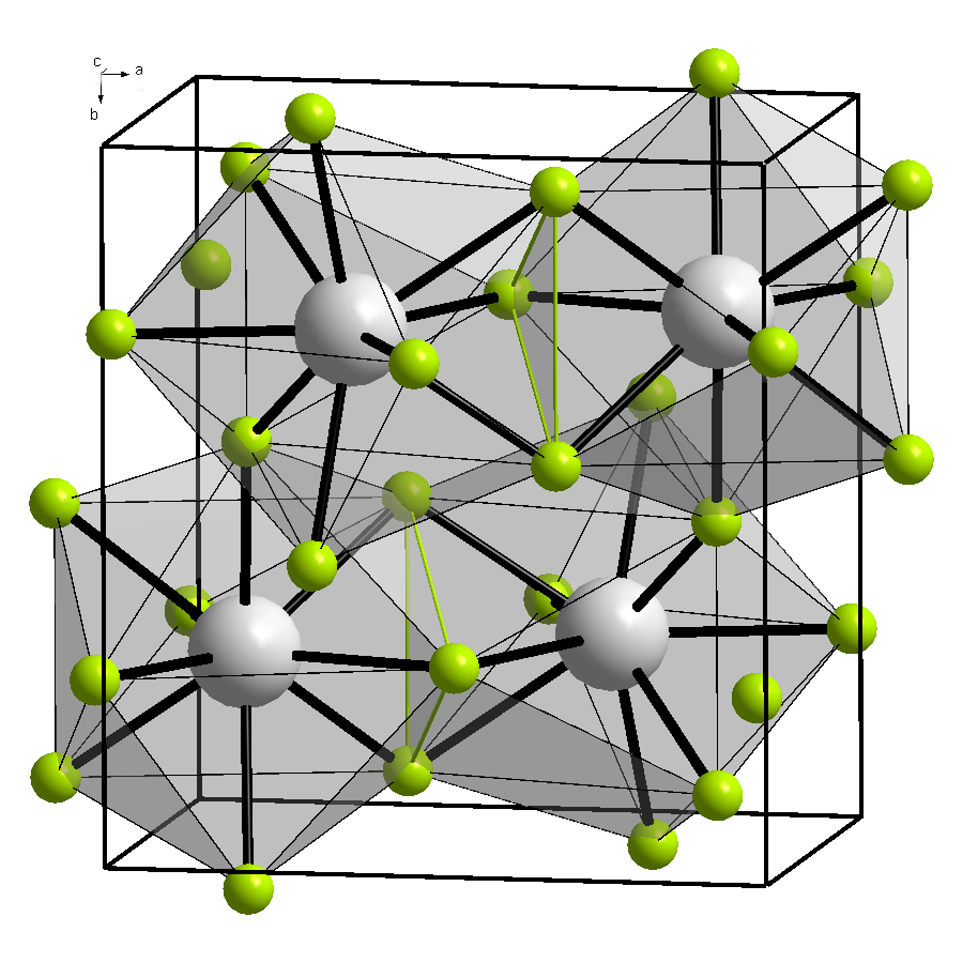

Names
- IUPAC name samarium(III) fluoride
- Other names samarium trifluoride trifluorosamarium

Identifiers
CAS Number	13765-24-7
3D model (JSmol)	Interactive image
ChemSpider	75536
ECHA InfoCard	100.033.956
EC Number	237-367-3
PubChem CID	83714
CompTox Dashboard (EPA)	DTXSID8065616
- InChI: InChI=1S/3FH.Sm/h3*1H;/q;;;+3/p-3 Key: OJIKOZJGHCVMDC-UHFFFAOYSA-K; InChI=1/3FH.Sm/h3*1H;/q;;;+3/p-3 Key: OJIKOZJGHCVMDC-DFZHHIFOAV
- SMILES: F[Sm](F)F

Properties
Chemical formula	SmF_{3}
Molar mass	207.36 g/mol
Appearance	Yellow odorless powder
Density	6.6 g/cm^{3} at 20 °C
Melting point	1,306 °C (2,383 °F; 1,579 K)
Boiling point	2,427 °C (4,401 °F; 2,700 K)
Solubility in water	Insoluble

Structure
Crystal structure	Orthorhombic, oP16, SpaceGroup = Pnma, No. 62

Related compounds
Other anions	Samarium(III) chloride Samarium(III) bromide Samarium(III) iodide
Other cations	Samarium(II) fluoride

Hazards
- GHS labelling
Pictograms	(GHS06: Toxic) (GHS07: Exclamation mark)
Signal word	Danger
Hazard statements	H301, H311, H315, H319, H331
Precautionary statements	P261, P264, P270, P271, P280, P301+P310, P302+P352, P304+P340, P305+P351+P338, P311, P312, P321, P322, P330, P332+P313, P337+P313, P361, P362, P363, P403+P233, P405, P501
- Except where otherwise noted, data are given for materials in their standard state (at 25 °C [77 °F], 100 kPa). verify (what is ?) Infobox references

Samarium(III) fluoride (SmF_{3}) is a slightly hygroscopic solid fluoride. Conditions/substances to avoid are: open flame, moisture, strong acids.

== Preparation ==
Samarium(III) fluoride can be obtained by reacting SmCl_{3} or Sm_{2}(CO_{3})_{3} with 40% hydrofluoric acid:

SmCl_{3} + 3 HF → SmF_{3}↓ + 3 HCl

Sm_{2}(CO_{3})_{3} + 6 HF → 2 SmF_{3} + 3 H_{2}O + 3 CO_{2}↑

Samarium(III) fluoride can also be produced by hydrothermal reaction of samarium nitrate and sodium fluroborate at 200 °C.

== Properties ==
=== Chemical ===
Samarium(III) fluoride reacts with some reducing agents at high temperatures to obtain samarium(II) fluoride:

$$\mathsf{ 4 SmF_3 + C \ \xrightarrow{2000^oC}\ 4 SmF_2 + CF_4 }$$
$$\mathsf{ 2 SmF_3 + Sm \ \xrightarrow{1800^oC}\ 3 SmF_2 }$$

=== Physical ===
At room temperature, samarium(III) fluoride has orthorhombic structure with space group Pnma – β-YF_{3} type with lattice constants a = 666,9 pm, b = 705,9 pm, c = 440,5 pm. Above 495 °C, it has the rhombohedral LaF_{3} structure (space group P3cl) – with lattice constants a = 707, c = 724 pm.
