= Ammonium iodide =

The ammonium cation
The iodide anion
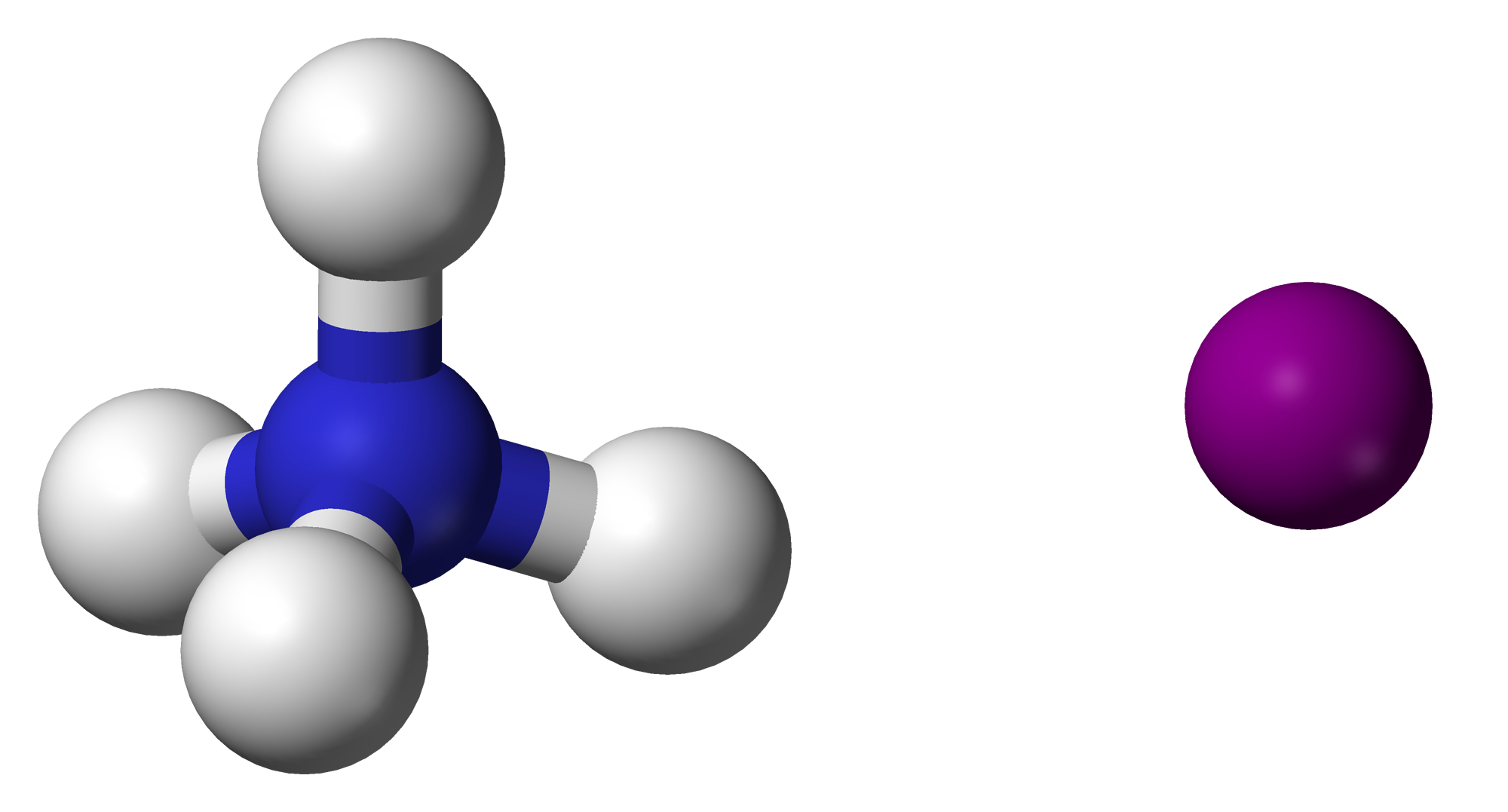
- ball-and-stick model of an ammonium cation (left) and an iodide anion (right)

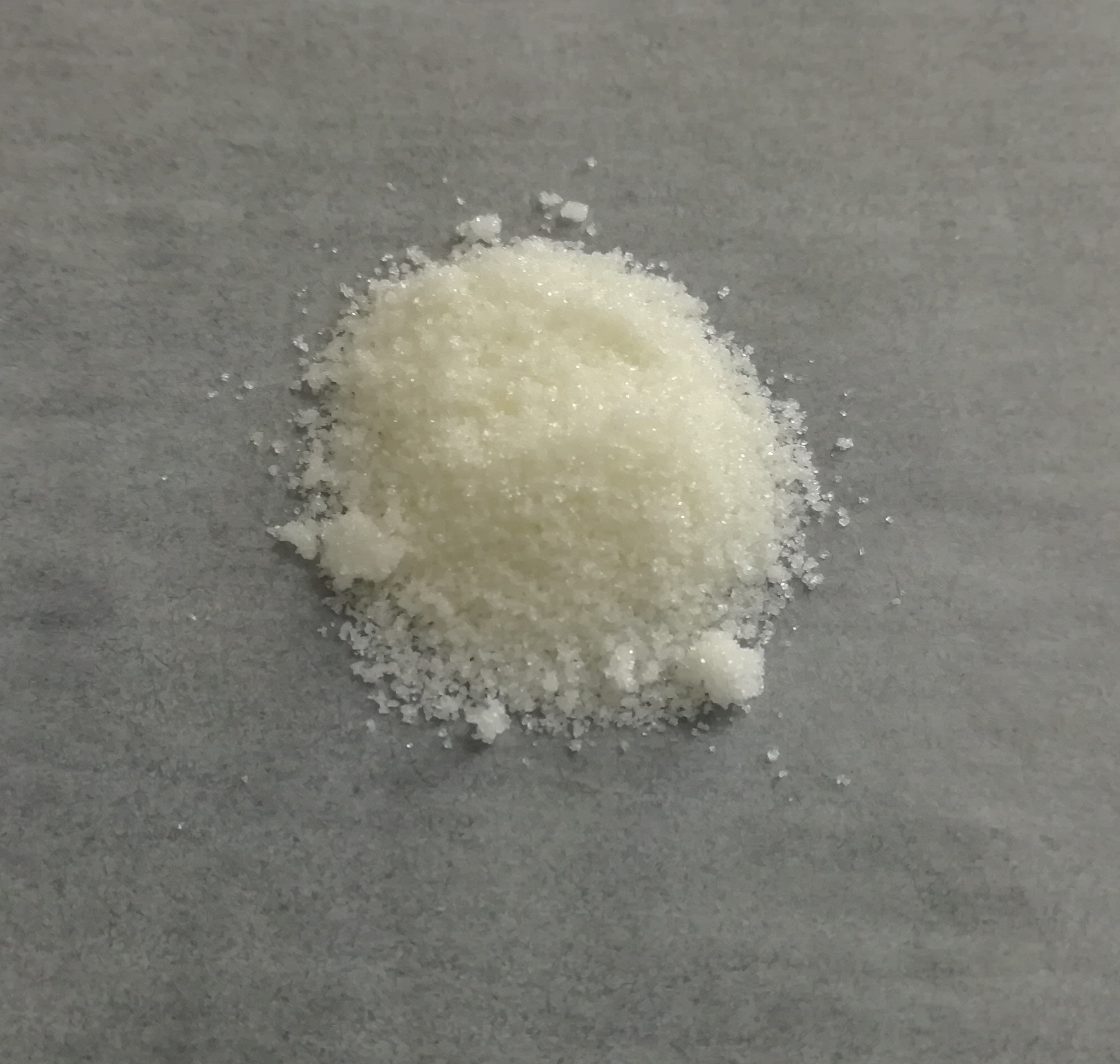
- Bulk sample of ammonium iodide

Identifiers
CAS Number	12027-06-4
3D model (JSmol)	Interactive image
ChemSpider	23785
ECHA InfoCard	100.031.548
PubChem CID	25487
UNII	OZ8F027LDH
CompTox Dashboard (EPA)	DTXSID60894063
- InChI: InChI=1S/HI.H3N/h1H;1H3 Key: UKFWSNCTAHXBQN-UHFFFAOYSA-N; InChI=1/HI.H3N/h1H;1H3 Key: UKFWSNCTAHXBQN-UHFFFAOYAU
- SMILES: [I-].[NH4+]

Properties
Chemical formula	NH_{4}I
Molar mass	144.94 g/mol
Appearance	White crystalline powder
Density	2.51 g/cm^{3}
Melting point	551 °C (1,024 °F; 824 K) (sublimes)
Boiling point	235 °C (455 °F; 508 K) (in vacuum)
Solubility in water	155 g/100 mL (0 °C); 172 g/100 mL (20 °C); 250 g/100 mL (100 °C)
Magnetic susceptibility (χ)	−66.0×10^{−6} cm^{3}/mol

Hazards
NFPA 704 (fire diamond)	2 0 0
Flash point	Non-flammable

Related compounds
Other anions	Ammonium fluoride Ammonium chloride Ammonium bromide
Other cations	Sodium iodide Potassium iodide Phosphonium iodide
- Except where otherwise noted, data are given for materials in their standard state (at 25 °C [77 °F], 100 kPa). verify (what is ?) Infobox references

Ammonium iodide is the inorganic compound with the formula NH_{4}I. It is an ionic compound. It takes the form of a white solid, though impure samples appear yellow. This salt consists of ammonium cation and an iodide anion. It can be prepared by the action of hydroiodic acid on ammonia. It is easily soluble in water, from which it crystallizes in cubes. It is also soluble in ethanol.

== Structure ==
Ammonium iodide is a salt that crystallizes in a motif akin those for the alkali metal iodides and most other ammonium halides. Several phases have been characterized, which are similar but not identical to those of ammonium chloride.

Under pressure, the compound melts congruently.

== Preparation ==
Ammonium iodide can be made in lab by treating ammonia with iodine and the reductant hydrogen peroxide:

2 NH_{3} + I_{2} + H_{2}O_{2} → 2 NH_{4}I + O_{2}

== Uses ==
Ammonium iodide is used as a dietary supplement to treat iodine deficiency.

== Properties and reactions ==
Vinyl sulfones have been prepared using ammonium iodide.

In green chemistry, ammonium iodide and an oxidant (e.g., H_{2}O_{2}) iodinate ketones and aromatic compounds.
