= Ytterbium(II) fluoride =

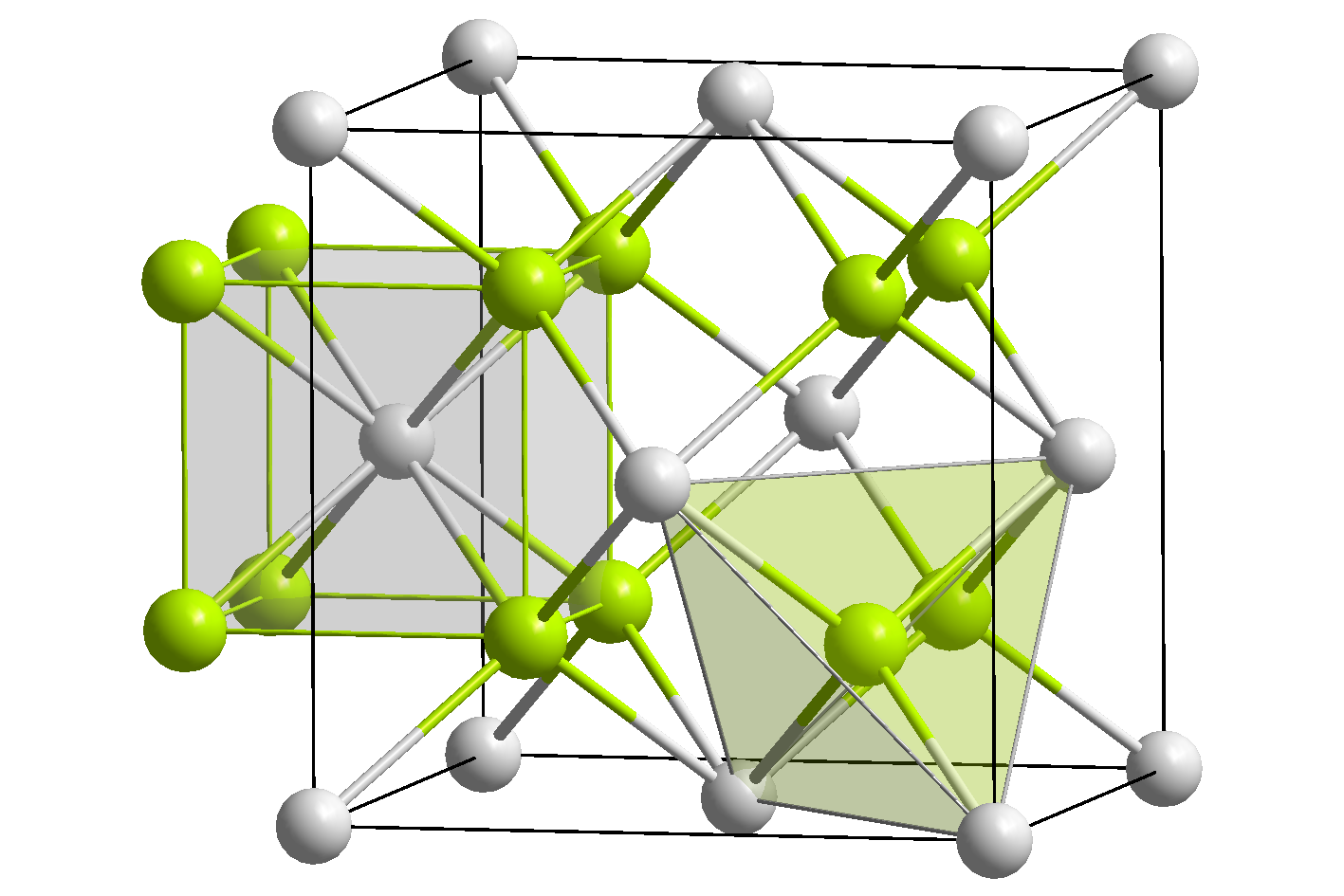

Names
- Other names Ytterbium difluoride

Identifiers
CAS Number	15192-18-4
3D model (JSmol)	Interactive image
ChemSpider	19971765
PubChem CID	21115929
- InChI: InChI=1S/2FH.Yb/h2*1H;/q;;+2/p-2 Key: DZIGMZRMIWDBCU-UHFFFAOYSA-L
- SMILES: [F-].[F-].[Yb+2]

Properties
Chemical formula	F_{2}Yb
Molar mass	211.042 g·mol^{−1}
Appearance	gray crystals
Density	g/cm^{3}
Melting point	1,407 °C (2,565 °F; 1,680 K)
Boiling point	2,380 °C (4,320 °F; 2,650 K)
Solubility in water	insoluble

Structure
Crystal structure	Fluorite structure
Space group	Fm3̅m (No. 225)
Lattice constant	a = 559.93 pm
Formula units (Z)	4

Related compounds
Other anions	Ytterbium(II) chloride Ytterbium(II) iodide
Other cations	Samarium(II) fluoride Europium(II) fluoride Thulium(II) fluoride
Related compounds	Ytterbium(III) fluoride
- Except where otherwise noted, data are given for materials in their standard state (at 25 °C [77 °F], 100 kPa). Infobox references

Ytterbium(II) fluoride is a binary inorganic compound of ytterbium and fluorine with the chemical formula YbF_{2}.

== Synthesis ==
Ytterbium(II) fluoride can be obtained by reacting ytterbium(III) fluoride with ytterbium or hydrogen.

2YbF_{3} + Yb → 3YbF_{2}
2YbF_{3} + H_{2} → 2YbF_{2} + 2HF

== Physical properties ==
Ytterbium(II) fluoride is a gray solid and crystallizes in the so-called fluorite type analogous to calcium fluoride with a unit cell a axis of 559.46 pm. In the crystal structure of ytterbium(II) fluoride, the Yb^{2+} cation is surrounded by eight F^{−} anions in the form of a cube, which is tetrahedrally surrounded by four Yb^{2+}.
