= Europium(II) chloride =

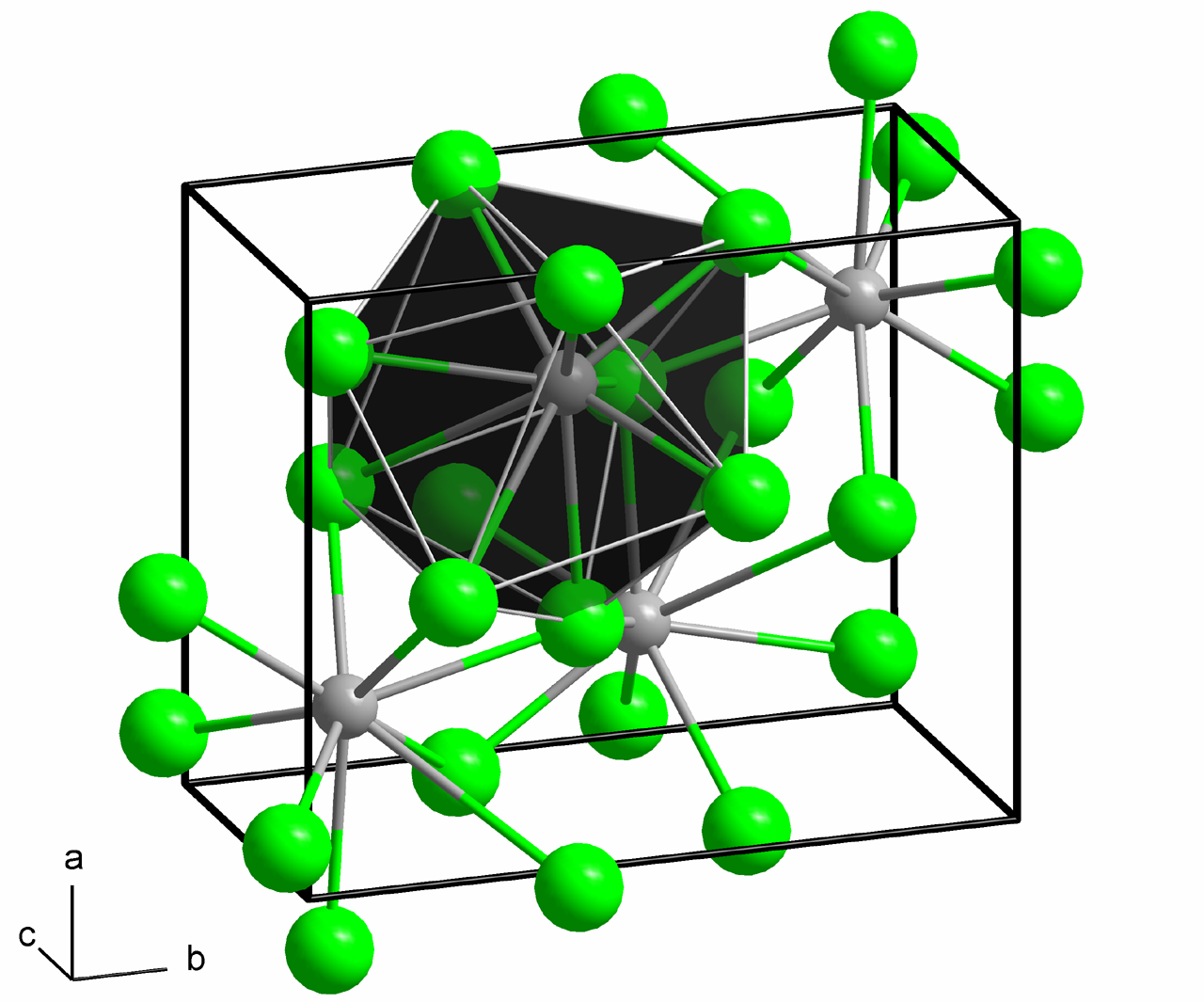

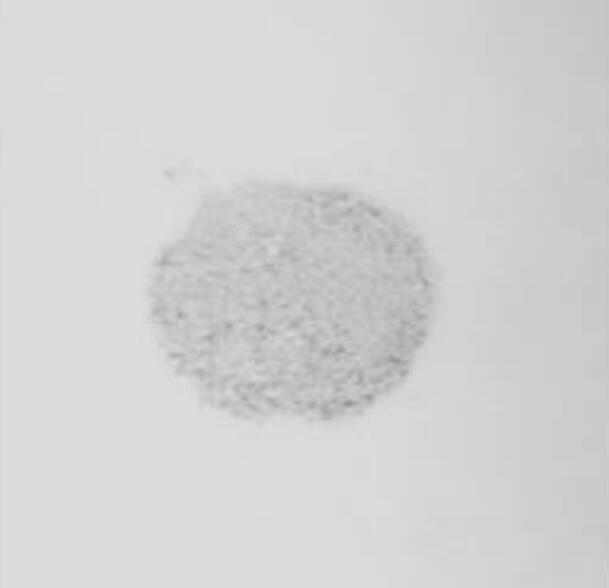

Names
- Other names Europium dichloride

Identifiers
CAS Number	13769-20-5 dry; 70442-98-7 dihydrate
3D model (JSmol)	Interactive image
ChemSpider	75541
ECHA InfoCard	100.033.973
EC Number	237-386-7
PubChem CID	83719
UNII	GHS5TFJ9TN
CompTox Dashboard (EPA)	DTXSID2065620
- InChI: InChI=1S/2ClH.Eu/h2*1H;/q;;+2/p-2 Key: BMANZYKPCBPZFG-UHFFFAOYSA-L
- SMILES: Cl[Eu]Cl

Properties
Chemical formula	Cl_{2}Eu
Molar mass	222.86 g·mol^{−1}
Appearance	white solid
Density	4.86 g·cm^{−3}
Melting point	738 °C (1,011 K)
Boiling point	2,190 °C (2,460 K)

Related compounds
Other anions	europium difluoride europium dibromide europium diiodide
Other cations	samarium dichloride thulium dichloride
Related compounds	europium trichloride
- Except where otherwise noted, data are given for materials in their standard state (at 25 °C [77 °F], 100 kPa). Infobox references

Europium(II) chloride is an inorganic compound with a chemical formula EuCl_{2}. When it is irradiated by ultraviolet light, it has bright blue fluorescence.

== Preparation ==
Europium dichloride can be produced by reducing europium trichloride with hydrogen gas at high temperature:

2 EuCl_{3} + H_{2} → 2 EuCl_{2} + 2 HCl

Dry europium trichloride reacts with lithium borohydride in THF solution to also produce europium dichloride:

2 EuCl_{3} + 2 LiBH_{4} → 2 EuCl_{2} + 2 LiCl + H_{2} + B_{2}H_{6}

== Properties ==
Europium dichloride can form yellow ammonia complexes:EuCl_{2}•8NH_{3}, and can dissolve to pale yellowish EuCl_{2}•NH_{3}. Europium dichloride can react with europium hydride at 120-bar H_{2}, producing EuClH that fluoresces green.
