= Thulium(III) chloride =

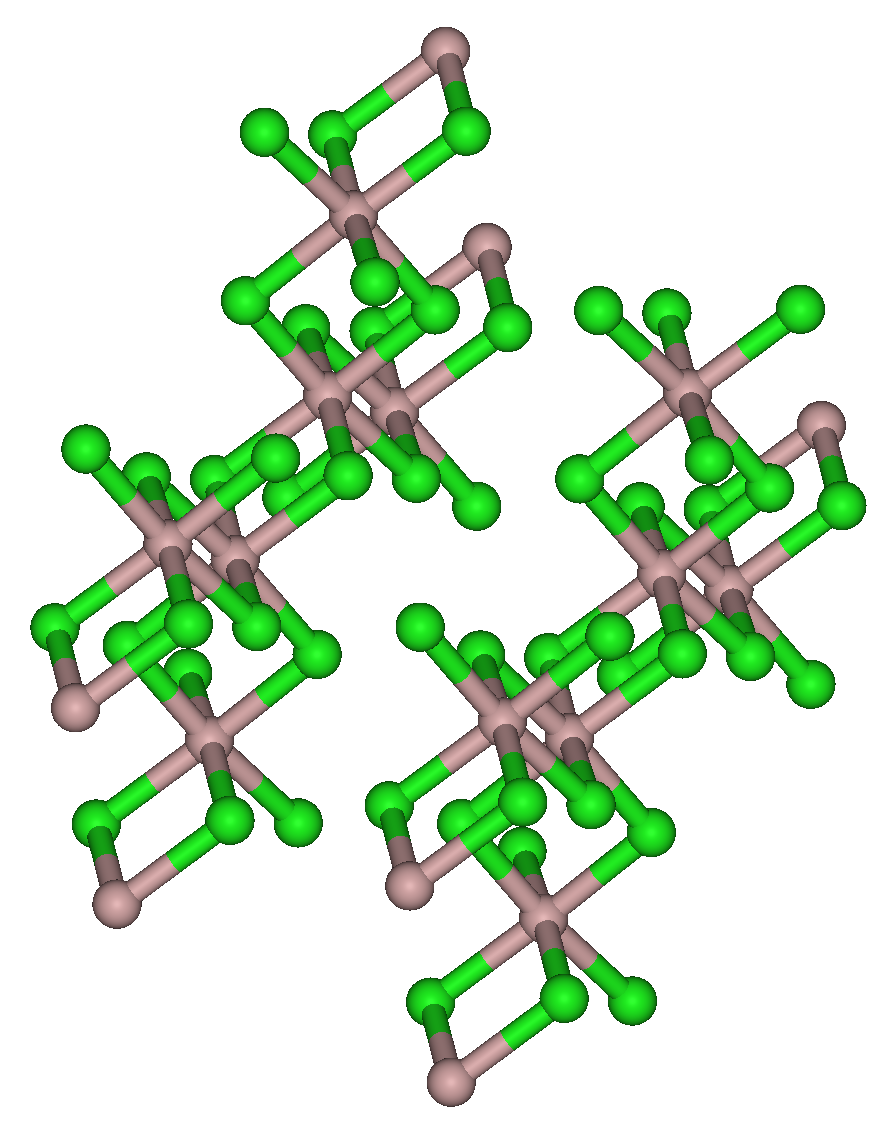

Names
- IUPAC name Thulium(III) chloride
- Other names Thulium chloride, thulium trichloride

Identifiers
CAS Number	13537-18-3
3D model (JSmol)	Interactive image
ChemSpider	55551
ECHA InfoCard	100.033.535
EC Number	236-904-9
PubChem CID	61643
RTECS number	XP0525000
UNII	73TYF012WF
CompTox Dashboard (EPA)	DTXSID4065529
- InChI: InChI=1S/3ClH.Tm/h3*1H;/q;;;+3/p-3
- SMILES: Cl[Tm](Cl)Cl

Properties
Chemical formula	TmCl_{3}
Molar mass	275.292 g/mol
Appearance	yellow crystals
Density	3.98 g/cm^{3}
Melting point	824 °C (1,515 °F; 1,097 K)
Boiling point	1,490 °C (2,710 °F; 1,760 K)
Solubility in water	heptahydrate: very soluble
Solubility	heptahydrate: very soluble in ethanol

Structure
Crystal structure	Monoclinic, mS16
Space group	C12/m1, No. 12
Coordination geometry	6

Thermochemistry
Std enthalpy of formation (Δ_{f}H^{⦵}_{298})	−966.6 kJ/mol

Hazards
- Occupational safety and health (OHS/OSH)
Main hazards	Irritant
- GHS labelling
Pictograms	(GHS07: Exclamation mark)
Signal word	Warning
Hazard statements	H315, H319, H335
Precautionary statements	P261, P264, P271, P280, P302+P352, P304+P340, P305+P351+P338, P312, P332+P313, P337+P313, P362, P403+P233, P405, P501

Related compounds
Other anions	Thulium(III) oxide
Other cations	Erbium(III) chloride Ytterbium(III) chloride Thulium(II) chloride
- Except where otherwise noted, data are given for materials in their standard state (at 25 °C [77 °F], 100 kPa). verify (what is ?) Infobox references

Thulium(III) chloride or thulium trichloride is as an inorganic salt composed of thulium and chlorine with the formula TmCl_{3}. It forms yellow crystals. Thulium(III) chloride has the YCl_{3} (AlCl_{3}) layer structure with octahedral thulium ions. It has been used as a starting material for some exotic nanostructures prepared for NIR photocatalysis.

== Preparation ==
Thulium(III) chloride can be obtained by reacting thulium(III) oxide or thulium(III) carbonate and ammonium chloride:

Tm_{2}O_{3} + 6 NH_{4}Cl → 2 TmCl_{3} + 6 NH_{3} + 2 H_{2}O

The hexahydrate of thulium(III) chloride can be obtained by adding thulium(III) oxide to concentrated hydrochloric acid.

2 Tm + 6 HCl → 2 TmCl_{3} + 3 H_{2}

Thulium(III) chloride can also be obtained by directly reacting thulium and chlorine:

2 Tm + 3 Cl_{2} → 2 TmCl_{3}

== Properties ==
Thulium(III) chloride is a light yellow powder. Its hexahydrate is a light green hygroscopic solid. Both are soluble in water. Thulium(III) chloride has a monoclinic crystal structure with the space group C2/m (No. 12) corresponding to that of aluminum(III) chloride.

Thulium(III) chloride reacts with strong bases to make thulium(III) oxide.
