= Calcium fluoride =

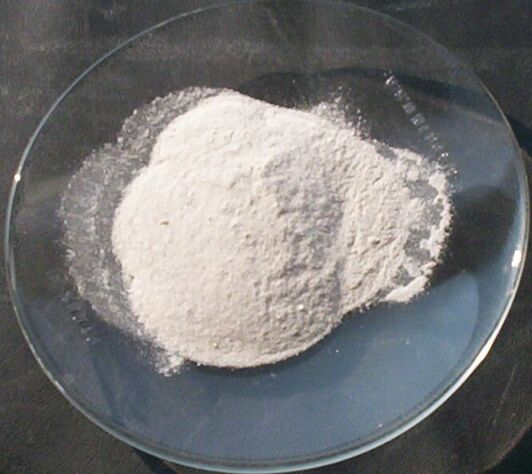

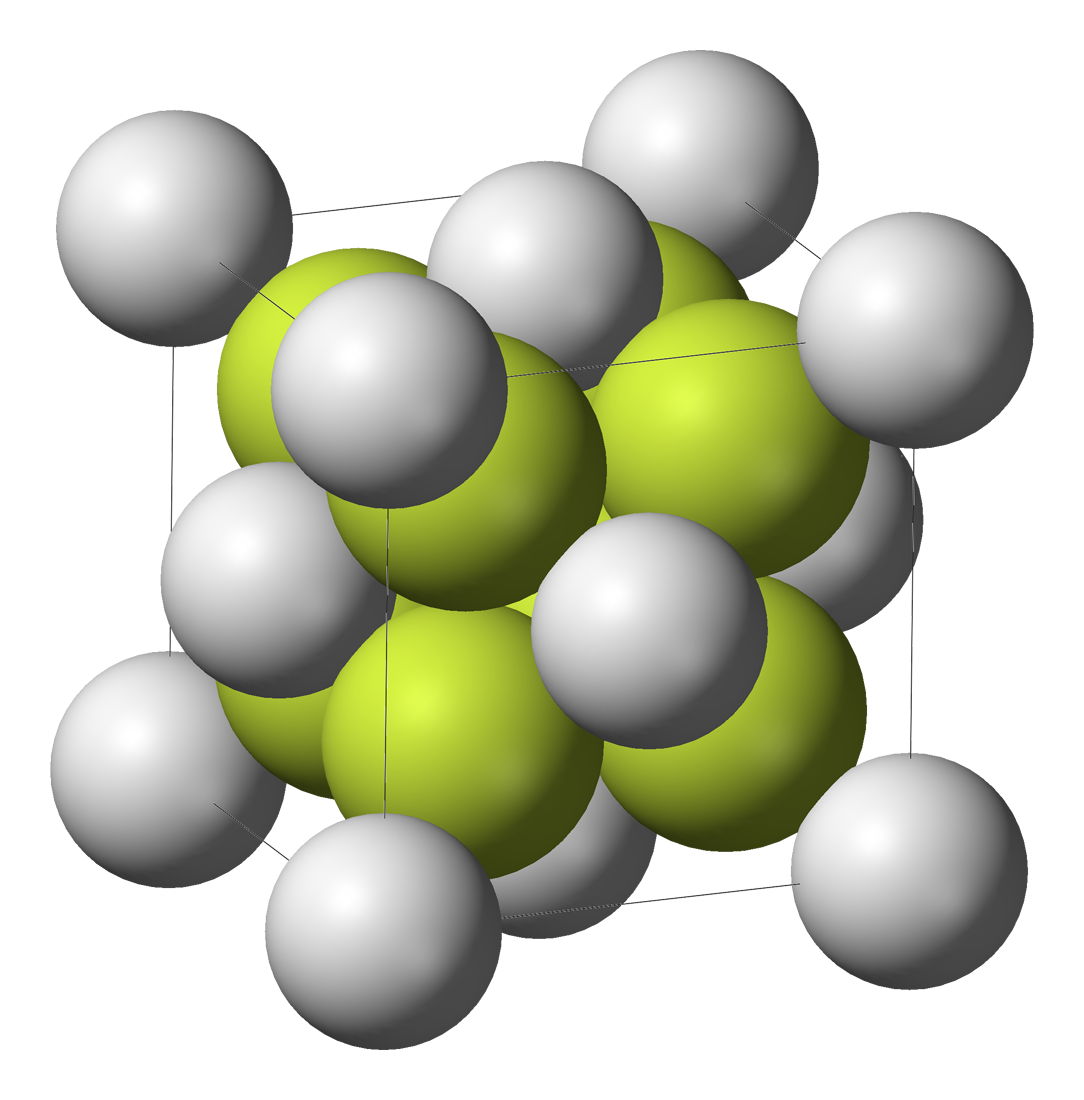

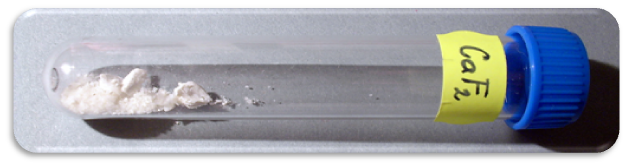

Identifiers
CAS Number	7789-75-5
3D model (JSmol)	Interactive image; Interactive image
ChEBI	CHEBI:35437
ChemSpider	23019
ECHA InfoCard	100.029.262
EC Number	232-188-7
PubChem CID	24617
RTECS number	EW1760000
UNII	O3B55K4YKI
CompTox Dashboard (EPA)	DTXSID4050487
- InChI: InChI=1S/Ca.2FH/h;2*1H/q+2;;/p-2 Key: WUKWITHWXAAZEY-UHFFFAOYSA-L; InChI=1/Ca.2FH/h;2*1H/q+2;;/p-2 Key: WUKWITHWXAAZEY-NUQVWONBAZ
- SMILES: [Ca+2].[F-].[F-]; F[Ca]F

Properties
Chemical formula	CaF_{2}
Molar mass	78.075 g·mol^{−1}
Appearance	White crystalline solid (single crystals are transparent)
Density	3.18 g/cm^{3}
Melting point	1,418 °C (2,584 °F; 1,691 K)
Boiling point	2,533 °C (4,591 °F; 2,806 K)
Solubility in water	0.015 g/L (18 °C); 0.016 g/L (20 °C)
Solubility product (K_{sp})	3.9 × 10^{−11}
Solubility	insoluble in acetone slightly soluble in acid
Magnetic susceptibility (χ)	−28.0·10^{−6} cm^{3}/mol
Refractive index (n_{D})	1.4338

Structure
Crystal structure	cubic crystal system, cF12
Space group	Fm3̅m, #225
Lattice constant	a = 5.451 Å, b = 5.451 Å, c = 5.451 Å α = 90°, β = 90°, γ = 90°
Coordination geometry	Ca, 8, cubic F, 4, tetrahedral

Hazards
- Occupational safety and health (OHS/OSH)
Main hazards	Reacts with concentrated sulfuric acid to produce hydrofluoric acid
NFPA 704 (fire diamond)	0 0 0
Flash point	Non-flammable
- Lethal dose or concentration (LD, LC)
LD_{Lo} (lowest published)	>5000 mg/kg (oral, guinea pig); 4250 mg/kg (oral, rat)
Safety data sheet (SDS)	ICSC 1323

Related compounds
Other anions	Calcium chloride Calcium bromide Calcium iodide
Other cations	Beryllium fluoride Magnesium fluoride Strontium fluoride Barium fluoride
- Except where otherwise noted, data are given for materials in their standard state (at 25 °C [77 °F], 100 kPa). verify (what is ?) Infobox references

Calcium fluoride is the inorganic compound of the elements calcium and fluorine with the formula CaF_{2}. It is a white solid that is practically insoluble in water. It occurs as the mineral fluorite (also called fluorspar), which is often deeply coloured owing to impurities.

== Chemical structure ==
The compound crystallizes in a cubic motif called the fluorite structure.

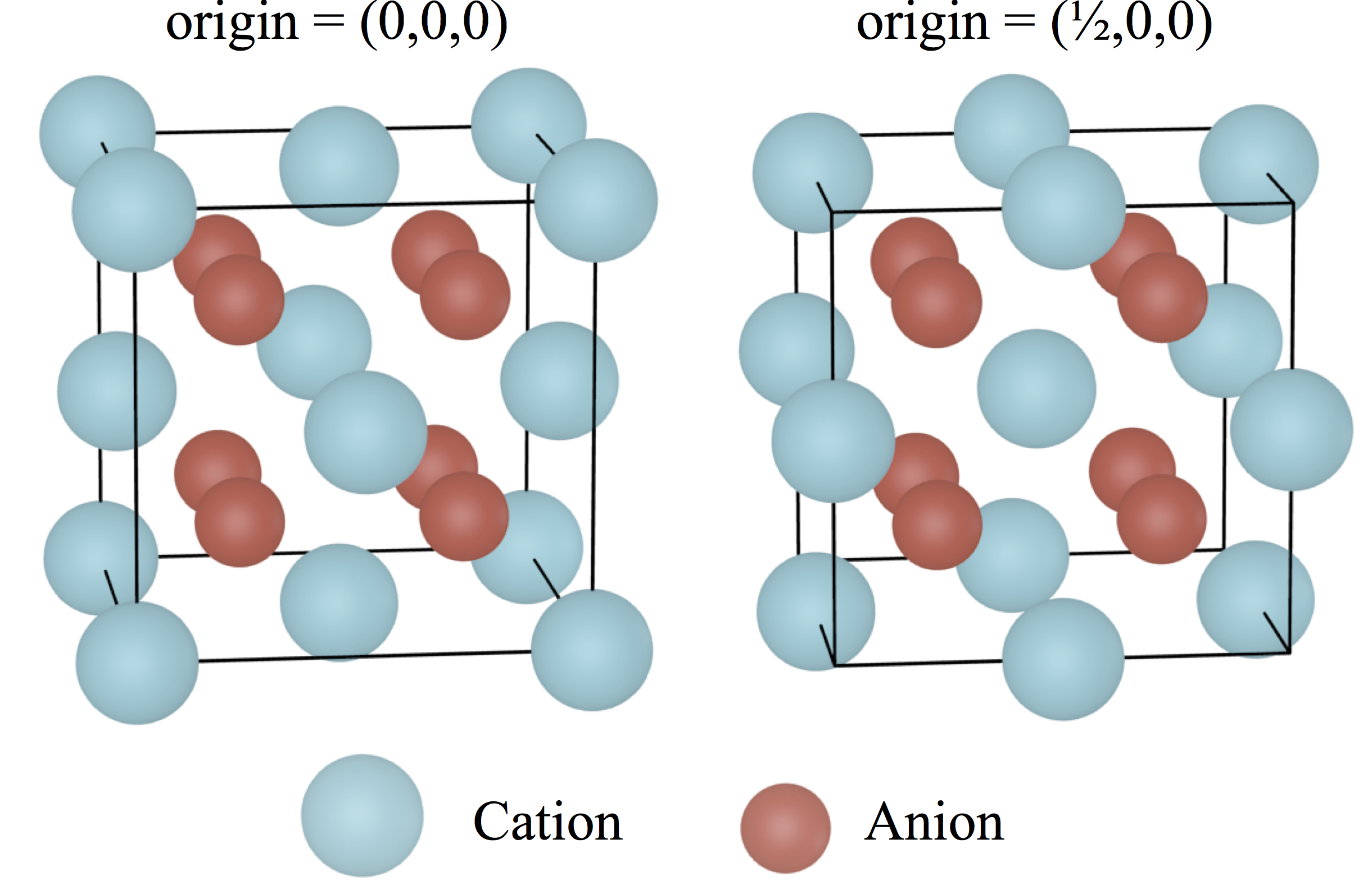
Unit cell of CaF_{2}, known as fluorite structure, from two equivalent perspectives. The second origin is often used when visualising point defects centred on the cation.

Ca^{2+} centres are eight-coordinate, being centred in a cube of eight F^{−} centres. Each F^{−} centre is coordinated to four Ca^{2+} centres in the shape of a tetrahedron. Although perfectly packed crystalline samples are colorless, the mineral is often deeply colored due to the presence of F-centers. The same crystal structure is found in numerous ionic compounds with formula AB_{2}, such as CeO_{2}, cubic ZrO_{2}, UO_{2}, ThO_{2}, and PuO_{2}. In the corresponding anti-structure, called the antifluorite structure, anions and cations are swapped, such as Be_{2}C.

=== Gas phase ===
The gas phase is noteworthy for failing the predictions of VSEPR theory; the CaF_{2} molecule is not linear like MgF_{2}, but bent with a bond angle of approximately 145°; the strontium and barium dihalides also have a bent geometry. It has been proposed that this is due to the fluoride ligands interacting with the electron core or the d-subshell of the calcium atom.

== Preparation ==
The mineral fluorite is abundant, widespread, and mainly of interest as a precursor to HF. Thus, little motivation exists for the industrial production of CaF_{2}. High purity CaF_{2} is produced by treating calcium carbonate with hydrofluoric acid:

CaCO_{3} + 2 HF → CaF_{2} + CO_{2} + H_{2}O

== Applications ==
Naturally occurring CaF_{2} is the principal source of hydrogen fluoride, a commodity chemical used to produce a wide range of materials. Calcium fluoride in the fluorite state is of significant commercial importance as a fluoride source. Hydrogen fluoride is liberated from the mineral by the action of concentrated sulfuric acid:

CaF_{2} + H_{2}SO_{4} → CaSO_{4}(solid) + 2 HF

=== Others ===
Calcium fluoride is used to manufacture optical components such as windows and lenses, used in thermal imaging systems, spectroscopy, telescopes, and excimer lasers (used for photolithography in the form of a fused lens). It is transparent over a broad range from ultraviolet (UV) to infrared (IR) frequencies. Its low refractive index reduces the need for anti-reflection coatings. Its insolubility in water is convenient as well. It also allows much smaller wavelengths to pass through.

Doped calcium fluoride, like natural fluorite, exhibits thermoluminescence and is used in thermoluminescent dosimeters. It forms when fluorine combines with calcium.

== Molecular calcium fluorides ==
Well-characterized molecular calcium fluorides are clusters are formed by treating CaF_{2} with large, multidentate ligands. Some calcium fluorides can serve as reagents for nucleophilic fluoride addition to organic compounds.

== Safety ==
CaF_{2} is classified as "not dangerous", although reacting it with sulfuric acid produces hydrofluoric acid, which is highly corrosive and toxic. With regards to inhalation, the NIOSH-recommended concentration of fluorine-containing dusts is 2.5 mg/m^{3} in air.

== See also ==
- List of laser types
- Photolithography
- Skeletal fluorosis
