= Samarium(III) chloride =

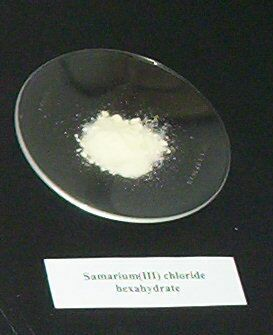
- Samarium(III)_chloride_hexahydrate

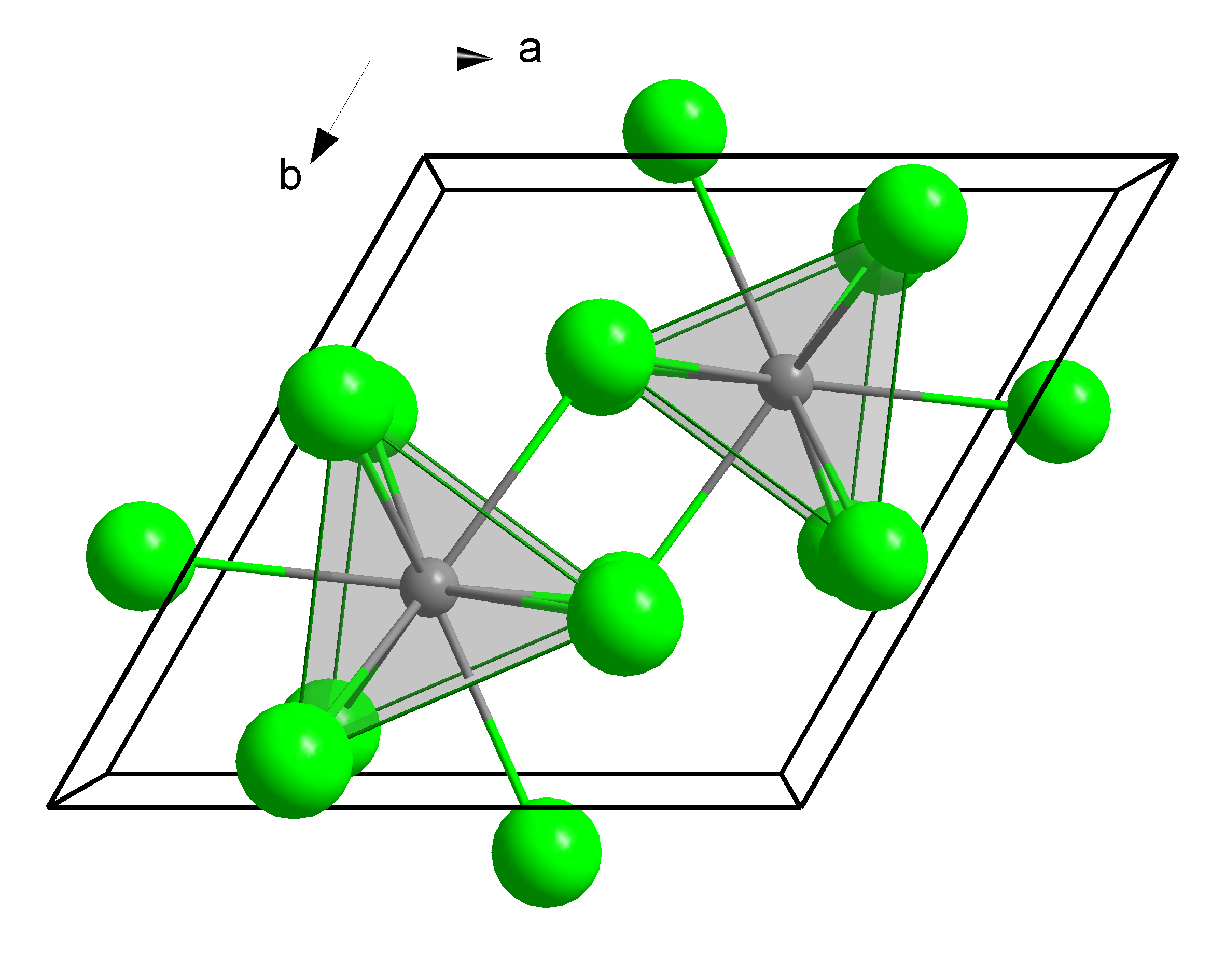

Names
- IUPAC name samarium(III) chloride
- Other names samarium trichloride trichlorosamarium

Identifiers
CAS Number	10361-82-7 (anhydrous); 13465-55-9 (hexahydrate)
3D model (JSmol)	Interactive image
ChemSpider	55428
ECHA InfoCard	100.030.712
EC Number	233-797-0
PubChem CID	10131313
UNII	5J4QGH7J16; 9874IU4M1V (hexahydrate)
CompTox Dashboard (EPA)	DTXSID4047757
- InChI: InChI=1S/3ClH.Sm/h3*1H;/q;;;+3/p-3 Key: BHXBZLPMVFUQBQ-UHFFFAOYSA-K; InChI=1/3ClH.Sm/h3*1H;/q;;;+3/p-3 Key: BHXBZLPMVFUQBQ-DFZHHIFOAZ
- SMILES: Cl[Sm](Cl)Cl

Properties
Chemical formula	SmCl_{3}
Molar mass	256.76 g/mol (anhydrous); 364.80 g/mol (hexahydrate)
Appearance	pale yellow solid (anhydrous) cream-coloured solid (hexahydrate)
Density	4.46 g/cm^{3} (anhydrous) 2.383 g/cm^{3} (hexahydrate)
Melting point	682 °C (1,260 °F; 955 K)
Boiling point	decomposes
Solubility in water	92.4 g/100 mL (10 °C)

Structure
Crystal structure	hexagonal, hP8
Space group	P6_{3}/m, No. 176
Coordination geometry	Tricapped trigonal prismatic (nine-coordinate)

Hazards
- Occupational safety and health (OHS/OSH)
Main hazards	Irritant
- GHS labelling
Pictograms	(GHS07: Exclamation mark)
Signal word	Warning
Hazard statements	H315, H319
Precautionary statements	P264, P280, P302+P352, P305+P351+P338, P321, P332+P313, P337+P313, P362

Related compounds
Other anions	Samarium(III) fluoride Samarium(III) bromide Samarium(III) oxide
Other cations	Samarium(II) chloride Promethium(III) chloride Europium(III) chloride
- Except where otherwise noted, data are given for materials in their standard state (at 25 °C [77 °F], 100 kPa). verify (what is ?) Infobox references

Samarium(III) chloride, also known as samarium trichloride, is an inorganic compound of samarium and chloride. It is a pale yellow salt that rapidly absorbs water to form a hexahydrate, SmCl_{3}^{.}6H_{2}O. The compound has few practical applications but is used in laboratories for research on new compounds of samarium.

== Structure ==
Like several related chlorides of the lanthanides and actinides, SmCl_{3} crystallises in the UCl_{3} motif. The Sm^{3+} centres are nine-coordinate, occupying trigonal prismatic sites with additional chloride ligands occupying the three square faces.

== Preparation and reactions ==
SmCl_{3} is prepared by the "ammonium chloride" route, which involves the initial synthesis of (NH_{4})_{2}[SmCl_{5}]. This material can be prepared from the common starting materials at reaction temperatures of 230 °C from samarium oxide:

10 NH_{4}Cl + Sm_{2}O_{3} → 2 (NH_{4})_{2}[SmCl_{5}] + 6 NH_{3} + 3 H_{2}O

The pentachloride is then heated to 350-400 °C resulting in evolution of ammonium chloride and leaving a residue of the anhydrous trichloride:

(NH_{4})_{2}[SmCl_{5}] → 2 NH_{4}Cl + SmCl_{3}

It can also be prepared from samarium metal and hydrochloric acid.

2 Sm + 6 HCl → 2 SmCl_{3} + 3 H_{2}

Aqueous solutions of samarium(III) chloride can be prepared by dissolving metallic samarium or samarium carbonate in hydrochloric acid.

Samarium(III) chloride is a moderately strong Lewis acid, which ranks as "hard" according to the HSAB concept. Aqueous solutions of samarium chloride can be used to prepare samarium trifluoride:

SmCl_{3} + 3 KF → SmF_{3} + 3 KCl

== Uses ==
Samarium(III) chloride is used for the preparation of samarium metal, which has a variety of uses, notably in magnets. Anhydrous SmCl_{3} is mixed with sodium chloride or calcium chloride to give a low melting point eutectic mixture. Electrolysis of this molten salt solution gives the free metal.

=== In laboratory ===
Samarium(III) chloride can also be used as a starting point for the preparation of other samarium salts. The anhydrous chloride is used to prepare organometallic compounds of samarium, such as bis(pentamethylcyclopentadienyl)alkylsamarium(III) complexes.
