= Europium(III) bromide =

Names
- IUPAC name Europium(III) bromide

Identifiers
CAS Number	13759-88-1
3D model (JSmol)	Interactive image
ChemSpider	75529
ECHA InfoCard	100.033.939
EC Number	237-349-5
PubChem CID	83707
UNII	TQ32498BDX
CompTox Dashboard (EPA)	DTXSID9065609
- InChI: InChI=1S/3BrH.Eu/h3*1H;/q;;;+2/p-3 Key: GJTREPCQBHSSHK-UHFFFAOYSA-K
- SMILES: [Eu+2].[Br-].[Br-].[Br-]

Properties
Chemical formula	EuBr_{3}
Molar mass	391.68 g
Melting point	702 °C (1,296 °F; 975 K)
Solubility in water	Will dissolve

Thermochemistry
Std molar entropy (S^{⦵}_{298})	50.7 ± 3
Std enthalpy of formation (Δ_{f}H^{⦵}_{298})	−186.1 ± 3
Gibbs free energy (Δ_{f}G^{⦵})	−179.3 ± 3

Hazards
- GHS labelling
Pictograms	(GHS07: Exclamation mark)
Signal word	Warning
Hazard statements	H315, H319, H335
Precautionary statements	P261, P264, P271, P280, P302+P352, P304+P340, P305+P351+P338, P312, P362, P403+P233
NFPA 704 (fire diamond)	0 1 1
- Except where otherwise noted, data are given for materials in their standard state (at 25 °C [77 °F], 100 kPa). Infobox references

Europium(III) bromide (or europium tribromide) is a crystalline compound, a salt, made of one europium and three bromine atoms. Europium tribromide is a grey powder at room temperature. It is odorless. Europium tribromide is hygroscopic.

== Reactions ==
When vaporized, europium(III) bromide reacts by the equation:

2 EuBr_{3} → 2 Eu + 3 Br_{2}

Europium(III) bromide is also created through the equations:

4 EuBr_{2} + 4 HBr → 4 EuBr_{3} + 2 H_{2}
