= Europium(II) iodide =

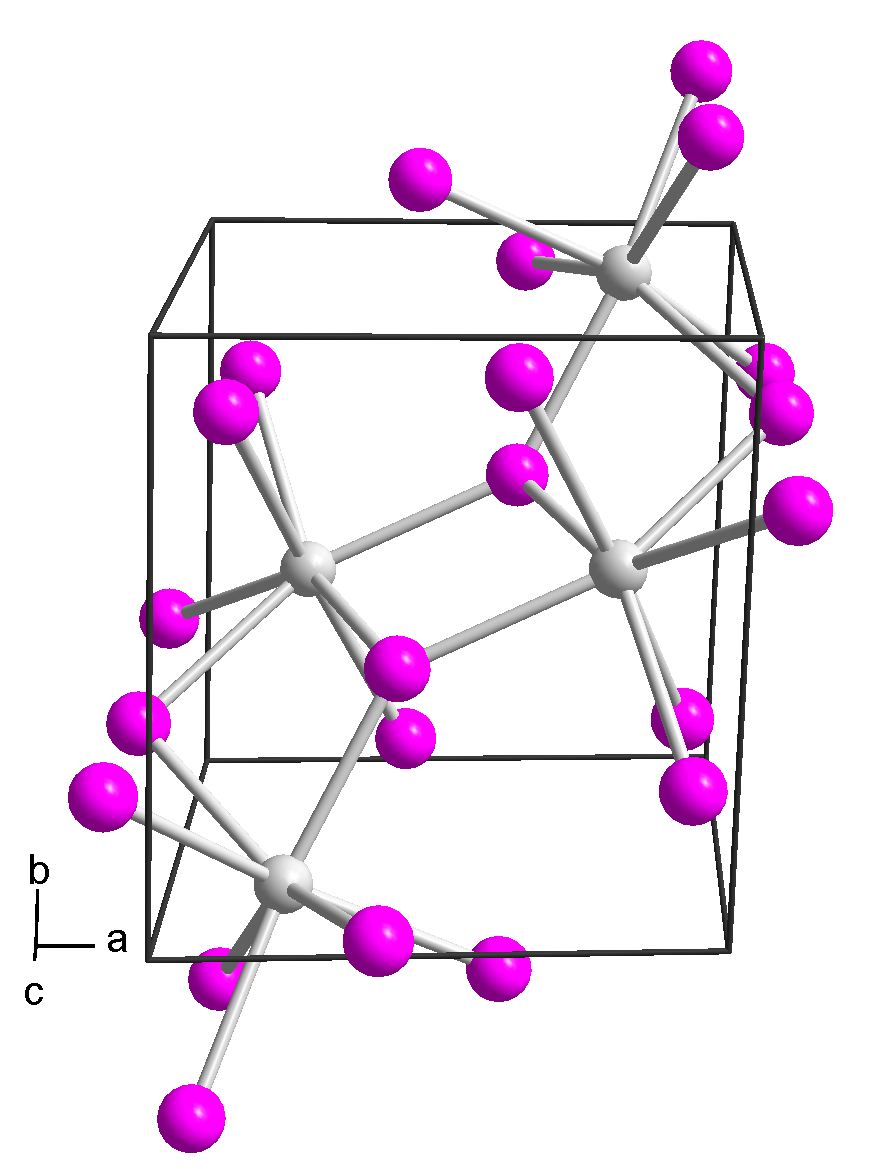

Names
- IUPAC name Europium(II) iodide

Identifiers
CAS Number	22015-35-6
3D model (JSmol)	Interactive image
ChemSpider	80445
ECHA InfoCard	100.040.641
EC Number	244-721-0
PubChem CID	519914
CompTox Dashboard (EPA)	DTXSID90944621
- InChI: InChI=1S/Eu.2HI/h;2*1H/q+2;;/p-2 Key: DPYXWFUVSMSNNV-UHFFFAOYSA-L
- SMILES: I[Eu]I

Properties
Chemical formula	EuI_{2}
Molar mass	405.77 g/mol
Appearance	Tea yellow powder
Melting point	510 °C (950 °F; 783 K)
Boiling point	1,120 °C (2,050 °F; 1,390 K)
Solubility in water	Soluble in THF
- Except where otherwise noted, data are given for materials in their standard state (at 25 °C [77 °F], 100 kPa). Infobox references

Europium(II) iodide is the iodide salt of divalent europium cation.

== Preparation ==
Europium(II) iodide can be prepared in a handful of ways, including:

Reduction of europium(III) iodide with hydrogen gas at 350 °C:

2 EuI_{3} + H_{2} → 2 EuI_{2} + 2 HI

Thermal decomposition of europium(III) iodide at 200 °C:

2 EuI_{3} → 2 EuI_{2} + 2 I_{2}

Reaction of europium with mercury(II) iodide:

Eu + HgI_{2} → Eu I_{2} + Hg

Reaction of europium with ammonium iodide:

Eu + 2 NH_{4}I → EuI_{2} + 2 NH_{3} + H_{2}

== Structure ==
Europium(II) iodide has several polymorphs. It adopts a monoclinic crystal structure in space group P 2_{1}/c (no. 14).

It also adopts an orthorhombic polymorph in space group Pbca (no. 61). This form is isostructural with strontium iodide.

A third polymorph of europium(II) iodide is formed if it is prepared from europium and ammonium iodide at low temperatures (200 K) in liquid ammonia. This low-temperature phase is orthorhombic and in space group Pnma (no. 62). This is the same structure as modification IV of strontium iodide.
