= Thulium(II) chloride =

Names
- Other names Thulium dichloride

Identifiers
CAS Number	22852-11-5
3D model (JSmol)	Interactive image
ChemSpider	124342
PubChem CID	140967
CompTox Dashboard (EPA)	DTXSID201336470
- InChI: InChI=1S/2ClH.Tm/h2*1H;/q;;+2/p-2 Key: YRYFSOMKKYRRHX-UHFFFAOYSA-L; InChI=1/2ClH.Tm/h2*1H;/q;;+2/p-2
- SMILES: Cl[Tm]Cl

Properties
Chemical formula	TmCl_{2}
Molar mass	239.839 g/mol
Appearance	dark green solid
Melting point	718°C
Solubility in water	reacts

Structure
Crystal structure	SrI_{2} crystal form
- Except where otherwise noted, data are given for materials in their standard state (at 25 °C [77 °F], 100 kPa). verify (what is ?) Infobox references

Thulium(II) chloride is an inorganic compound with the chemical formula TmCl_{2}.

== Production ==
Thulium(II) chloride can be produced by reducing thulium(III) chloride by thulium metal:

2 TmCl_{3} + Tm → 3 TmCl_{2}

== Chemical properties ==
Thulium(II) chloride reacts with water violently, producing hydrogen gas and thulium(III) hydroxide. When thulium(II) chloride first touches water, a light red solution is formed, which fades quickly.
