= Thulium(II) fluoride =

Names
- Other names Thulium difluoride

Identifiers
CAS Number	54952-16-8
3D model (JSmol)	Interactive image
PubChem CID	175749855
- InChI: InChI=1S/2FH.Tm/h2*1H;/q;;+2/p-2 Key: WWYXXLSAQZONJA-UHFFFAOYSA-L
- SMILES: [F-].[F-].[Tm+2]

Properties
Chemical formula	TmF_{2}
Molar mass	206.93
- Except where otherwise noted, data are given for materials in their standard state (at 25 °C [77 °F], 100 kPa). Infobox references

Thulium(II) fluoride is one of the fluoride salts of the lanthanide metal thulium, with the chemical compound of TmF_{2}. It can react with zirconium tetrafluoride at 900 °C to form TmZrF_{6}, which has a hexagonal structure. In addition, low-temperature Mössbauer spectroscopy and some theoretical studies of thulium(II) fluoride have also been reported.
