= Europium(III) fluoride =

Names
- Other names Europium trifluoride

Identifiers
CAS Number	13765-25-8
3D model (JSmol)	Interactive image
ChemSpider	75537
ECHA InfoCard	100.033.957
EC Number	237-368-9
PubChem CID	83715
CompTox Dashboard (EPA)	DTXSID3065617
- InChI: InChI=1S/Eu.3FH/h;3*1H/q+3;;;/p-3 Key: HPNURIVGONRLQI-UHFFFAOYSA-K
- SMILES: F[Eu](F)F

Properties
Chemical formula	EuF_{3}
Molar mass	208.959 g·mol^{−1}
- Except where otherwise noted, data are given for materials in their standard state (at 25 °C [77 °F], 100 kPa). Infobox references

Europium(III) fluoride is an inorganic compound with a chemical formula EuF_{3}.

== Production ==
Europium(III) fluoride can be produced by reacting europium(III) nitrate and ammonium fluoride:

Eu(NO_{3})_{3} + 3 NH_{4}F → EuF_{3} + 3 NH_{4}NO_{3}

Europium(III) fluoride nanoparticles can be synthesized by microwave irradiation of europium(III) acetate in an ionic liquid that has tetrafluoroborate as the anion.
