= Europium(III) chloride =

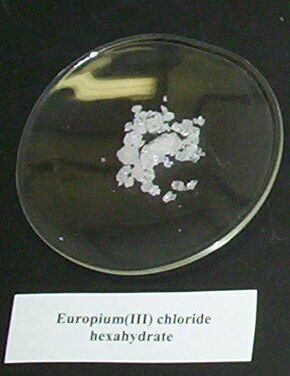

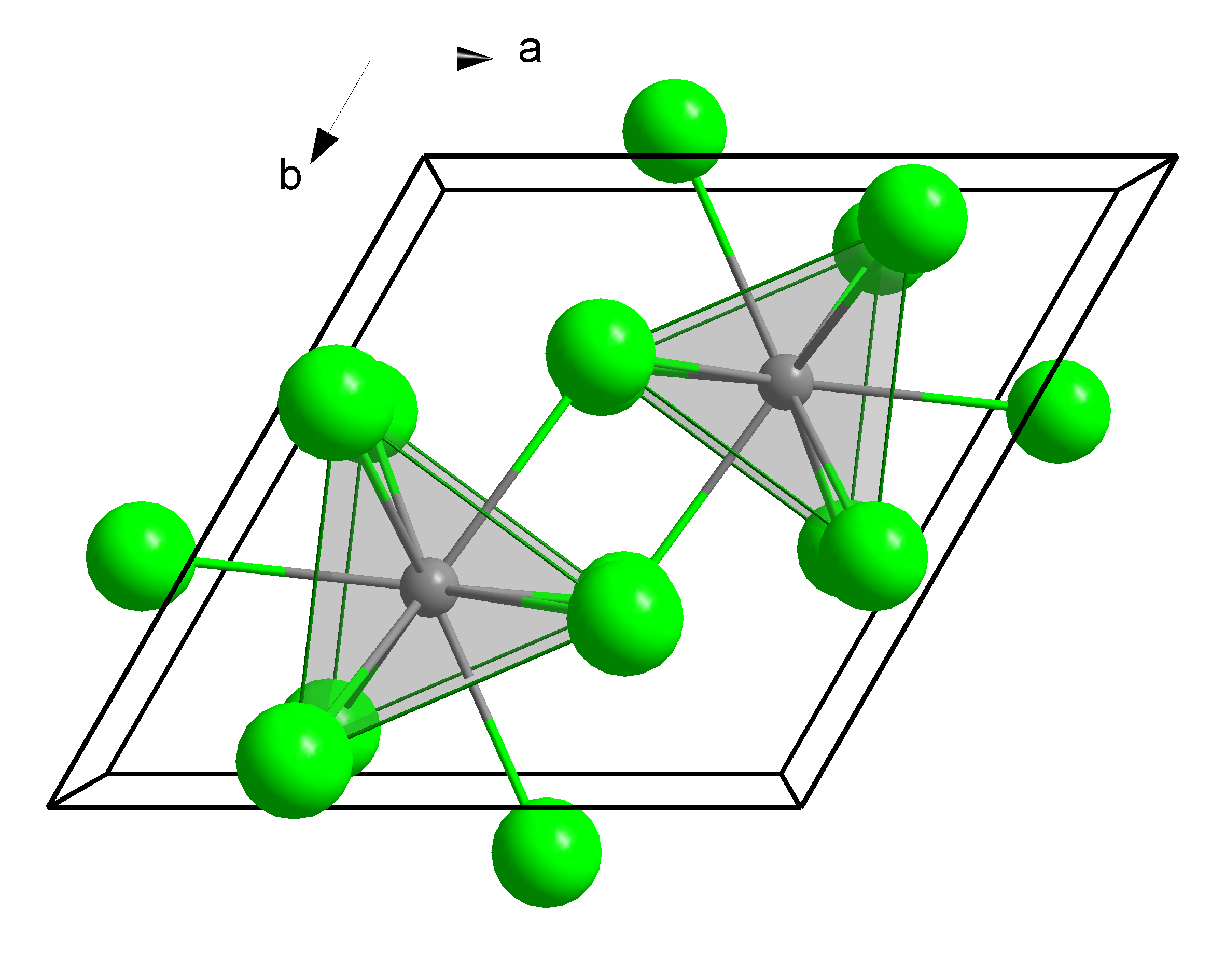

Names
- IUPAC names Europium(III) chloride Europium trichloride

Identifiers
CAS Number	10025-76-0; 13759-92-7 (hexahydrate)
3D model (JSmol)	Interactive image
ChemSpider	23194
ECHA InfoCard	100.030.025
EC Number	233-040-4
PubChem CID	24809
RTECS number	LE7525000
UNII	LP6WL6W368
CompTox Dashboard (EPA)	DTXSID2041965
- InChI: InChI=1S/3ClH.Eu/h3*1H;/q;;;+3/p-3 Key: NNMXSTWQJRPBJZ-UHFFFAOYSA-K; InChI=1/3ClH.Eu/h3*1H;/q;;;+3/p-3 Key: NNMXSTWQJRPBJZ-DFZHHIFOAZ
- SMILES: Cl[Eu](Cl)Cl

Properties
Chemical formula	EuCl_{3}
Molar mass	258.323 g/mol 366.41 g/mol (hexahydrate)
Melting point	632 °C (1,170 °F; 905 K) decomposes
Solubility in other solvents	Soluble

Structure
Crystal structure	hexagonal (UCl_{3} type), hP8
Space group	P6_{3}/m, No. 176
Coordination geometry	Tricapped trigonal prismatic (nine-coordinate)

Related compounds
Other anions	Europium(III) oxide
Other cations	Samarium(III) chloride Gadolinium(III) chloride
Related compounds	Europium dichloride
- Except where otherwise noted, data are given for materials in their standard state (at 25 °C [77 °F], 100 kPa). verify (what is ?) Infobox references

Europium(III) chloride is an inorganic compound with the formula EuCl_{3}. The anhydrous compound is a yellow solid. Being hygroscopic it rapidly absorbs water to form a white crystalline hexahydrate, EuCl_{3}·6H_{2}O, which is colourless. The compound is used in research.

== Preparation ==
Treating Eu_{2}O_{3} with aqueous HCl produces hydrated europium chloride (EuCl_{3}·6H_{2}O). This salt cannot be rendered anhydrous by heating. Instead one obtains an oxychloride. Anhydrous EuCl_{3} is often prepared by the "ammonium chloride route," starting from either Eu_{2}O_{3} or hydrated europium chloride (EuCl_{3}·6H_{2}O) by heating carefully to 230 °C. These methods produce (NH_{4})_{2}[EuCl_{5}]:

10 NH_{4}Cl + Eu_{2}O_{3} → 2 (NH_{4})_{2}[EuCl_{5}] + 6 NH_{3} + 3 H_{2}O

EuCl_{3}·6H_{2}O + 2 NH_{4}Cl → (NH_{4})_{2}[EuCl_{5}] + 6 H_{2}O

The pentachloride decomposes thermally according to the following equation:

(NH_{4})_{2}[EuCl_{5}] → 2 NH_{4}Cl + EuCl_{3}

The thermolysis reaction proceeds via the intermediary of (NH_{4})[Eu_{2}Cl_{7}].

== Reactions ==
Europium(III) chloride is a precursor to other europium compounds. It can be converted to the corresponding metal bis(trimethylsilyl)amide via salt metathesis with lithium bis(trimethylsilyl)amide. The reaction is performed in THF and requires a period at reflux.

EuCl_{3} + 3 LiN(SiMe_{3})_{2} → Eu(N(SiMe_{3})_{2})_{3} + 3 LiCl

Eu(N(SiMe_{3})_{2})_{3} is a starting material for the more complicated coordination complexes.

Reduction with hydrogen gas with heating gives EuCl_{2}. The latter has been used to prepare organometallic compounds of europium(II), such as bis(pentamethylcyclopentadienyl)europium(II) complexes. Europium(III) chloride can be used as a starting point for the preparation of other europium salts.

== Structure ==
In the solid state, it crystallises in the UCl_{3} motif. The Eu centres are nine-coordinate.

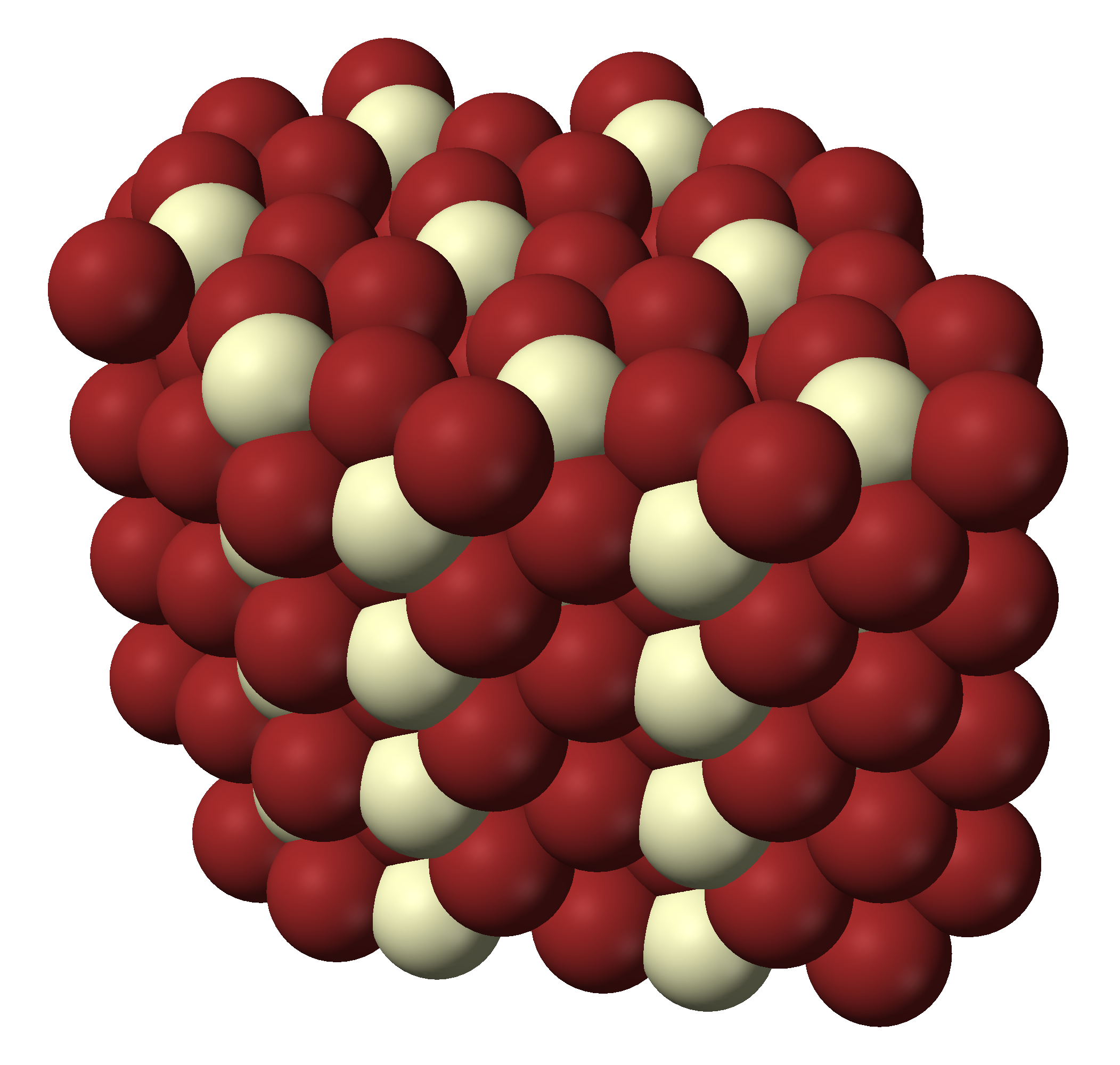
Space-filling image of EuCl_{3}.

== Bibliography ==
- Weast, R. C., ed. (1972). Handbook of Chemistry and Physics (53rd ed.). Cleveland, Ohio: Chemical Rubber Co.
