= Europium compounds =

Chemical compounds

Europium compounds fluoresce under UV light at 395 nm and 365 nm.

Europium compounds are compounds formed by the lanthanide metal europium (Eu). In these compounds, europium generally exhibits the +3 oxidation state, such as EuCl_{3}, Eu(NO_{3})_{3} and Eu(CH_{3}COO)_{3}. Compounds with europium in the +2 oxidation state are also known. The +2 ion of europium is the most stable divalent ion of lanthanide metals in aqueous solution. Many europium compounds fluoresce under ultraviolet light due to the excitation of electrons to higher energy levels. Lipophilic europium complexes often feature acetylacetonate-like ligands, e.g., Eufod.

== Properties of europium compounds ==
Formula	Color	Crystal structure	Space group	No
EuBr_{2}	white	SrBr_{2}	P4/n	85
EuBr_{3}	grey	PuBr_{3}	Cmcm	63
EuCl_{2}	white	PbCl_{2}	Pnma	62
EuCl_{3}	yellow	UCl_{3}	P6_{3}/m	176
EuF_{2}	dark yellowish	fluorite	Fm3̅m	225
EuF_{3}	white	LaF_{3}	Pnma	62
EuI_{2}	yellow	monoclinic	P2_{1}/c	14
EuI_{3}	colorless	BiI_{3}	R3̅	148
EuH_{2}	dark red	PbCl_{2}	Pnma	62
Eu(OH)_{2}	pale yellow	orthorhombic	P2_{1}am	26
Eu(OH)_{3}	pale pink	hexagonal	P6_{3}/m	176
EuO	violet	fluorite	Fm3̅m	225
Eu_{2}O_{3}	white	monoclinic	C2/m	12
EuS	black	fluorite	Fm3̅m	225
EuSe	black	fluorite	Fm3̅m	225
EuTe	black	fluorite	Fm3̅m	225
EuSO_{4}	white	orthorhombic	Pnma	62
Eu_{2}(SO_{4})_{3}	white	monoclinic	C2/c	15

== Chalcogenides ==
=== Oxides ===
Europium(II) oxide can be obtained by the reduction of europium(III) oxide with metallic europium at high temperatures. It has a rock-salt structure, is a deep red solid, and is ferromagnetic at 77 K. It has the potential to become a magnetic refrigeration material (ΔS_{mag}=−143 mg/cm^{3} K，50 kOe). Europium(II) sulfide is also ferromagnetic, but europium(II) telluride is antiferromagnetic. The mixed valence oxide Eu_{3}O_{4} of europium can be obtained by reducing europium(III) oxide with a reducing agent in a hydrogen atmosphere, such as:

2 Eu_{2}O_{3} + 2 EuOCl + 2 LiH → 2 Eu_{3}O_{4} + 2 LiCl + H_{2}↑

Europium(III) oxide is the most stable oxide of europium, a light pink solid with a high melting point, which can be obtained by the thermal decomposition of europium(III) nitrate. It reacts with water to give EuOOH. The reaction of soluble europium salts with ammonia or sodium hydroxide can precipitate hydroxide Eu(OH)_{3}, but in the presence of polyhydroxyl compounds (such as glucose), the precipitation is incomplete.

Eu(H_{2}O) and Eu(H_{2}O)_{2} complexes can be obtained by the reaction of metallic europium in solid argon with water. Eu(H_{2}O) is rearranged to obtain HEuOH, which is further decomposed into EuO and H_{2}; Eu(H_{2}O)_{2} is decomposed into Eu(OH)_{2} and H_{2}.

=== Other chalcogenides ===
Europium(III) sulfide can be obtained by the decomposition of Eu(Et_{2}NCS_{2})_{3} then at 500~600 °C. Europium(III) sulfide can also be obtained by the decomposition of the thiocyanate Eu(NCS)_{3}; Its two crystal forms, α-type and γ-type, belong to orthorhombic and cubic crystal systems, respectively. Europium(II) sulfide is prepared by sulfiding the oxide at temperatures sufficiently high to decompose europium(III) oxide:

Eu_{2}O_{3} + 3 H_{2}S → 2 EuS + 3 H_{2}O + S

The selenides, europium(III) selenide and europium(II) selenide, and tellurides, europium(II) telluride and europium(III) telluride, are also known. They can generally be prepared by reacting europium with selenium or tellurium in a vacuum ampoule at a high temperature. Europium(II) selenide can also be obtained by heating europium(II) oxalate with an excess of selenium.

Europium oxysulfide is obtained by reacting europium(III) oxide in a carbon disulfide/argon/low-pressure oxygen stream. It is a solid of the triclinic crystal system, with the space group P3̅m1, and its optical band gap is 4.4 eV. Europium oxyselenide and europium oxytelluride can be prepared by reacting europium(III) oxide with selenium or tellurium at 600 °C. The oxyselenide is heated in air and oxidized to oxyselenite. A similar reaction occurs with oxytelluride to give Eu_{2}TeO_{6}.

== Halides ==
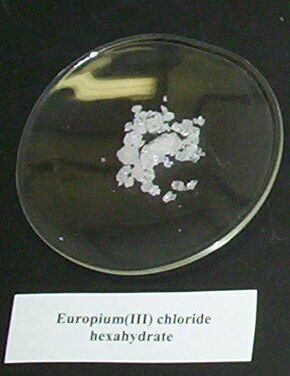
Europium(III) chloride hexahydrate

Europium metal reacts with all the halogens:

2 Eu + 3 X_{2} → 2 EuX_{3} (X = F, Cl, Br, I)

This route gives white europium(III) fluoride (EuF_{3}), yellow europium(III) chloride (EuCl_{3}), gray europium(III) bromide (EuBr_{3}), and colorless europium(III) iodide (EuI_{3}). Europium also forms the corresponding dihalides: yellow-green europium(II) fluoride (EuF_{2}), colorless europium(II) chloride (EuCl_{2}) (although it has a bright blue fluorescence under UV light), colorless europium(II) bromide (EuBr_{2}), and green europium(II) iodide (EuI_{2}).

Europium can form all four trihalides. They are strong electrolytes in water, and all but the fluoride are soluble in water. Anhydrous europium trihalides can be prepared by reacting oxides or the halides' hydrates:

Eu_{2}O_{3} + 6 NH_{4}Cl → 2 EuCl_{3} + 3 H_{2}O + 6 NH_{3}↑
EuCl_{3}·6H_{2}O + 6 SOCl_{2} → EuCl_{3} + 6 SO_{2}↑ + 12 HCl↑

Among them, europium(III) iodide can only be obtained by reacting europium(III) oxide and hydroiodic acid.

In addition, europium can also form all four dihalides. They can generally be prepared by reducing the corresponding europium trihalide with hydrogen gas or europium:

2 EuX_{3} + H_{2} → 2 EuX_{2} + 2 HX

Europium(II) iodide can also be obtained by direct treating the reagent with ammonium iodide. Of the dihalides, EuF_{2} and EuI_{2} are yellow, and EuCl_{2} and EuBr_{2} are white, although when irradiated by ultraviolet light, EuCl_{2} has a bright blue fluorescence.

== Pnictides ==
Europium(III) nitride is a black solid that can be prepared by the reaction of metallic europium in a stream of ammonia in corundum boats in fused quartz tubes at 700 °C:

2 Eu +2 NH_{3} → 2 EuN + 3 H_{2}

In this reaction, the europium is oxidized and the hydrogen in the ammonia is reduced. Europium(III) nitride shows Van Vleck paramagnetism and crystallises in the rock salt structure. Thin films of rare earth nitrides, including europium(III) nitride, tend to form oxides in the presence of oxygen. Europium(III) phosphide can be produced from a solution of europium metal in liquid ammonia with phosphine at -78 °C. This produces hydrogen and first Eu(PH_{2})_{2} is formed, but it then decomposes to EuP and PH_{3}. It crystallises cubically like NaCl. Pure europium(III) phosphide also shows Van Vleck paramagnetism. Europium(II) diarsenide, Eu_{2}As_{2}, is unique which it contains the As^{2−}_{2} ion instead of the As^{3-} ion, unlike other lanthanide arsenides. It crystallizes in the distorted Na_{2}O_{2} structure, similar to nickel arsenide, and is produced from reacting europium and arsenic at 600 °C. Other arsenides, antimonides and bismuthides of europium are also known.

== Organoeuropium compounds ==
Organoeuropium compounds are a class of organic metal compounds containing Eu-C bonds. The cyclopentadienyl complexes of europium were studied in the early stage. They can be prepared by the reaction of sodium cyclopentadienide and anhydrous europium halide in tetrahydrofuran, such as:

EuCl_{3} + 3 C_{5}H_{5}Na → (C_{5}H_{5})_{3}Eu + 3 NaCl
EuI_{2} + 2 (C_{5}H^{i}Pr_{4})Na → (C_{5}H^{i}Pr_{4})_{2}Eu + 2 NaI

Europium bis(tetraisopropylocene) is an orange-red solid that can be melted at 165 °C. The complex of cyclononatetraene and europium(II) can be prepared by a similar method, and its toluene solution emits blue-green fluorescence at 516 nm, compared with other organic europium(II) sandwich complexes (about 630 nm) with a clear blue shift.

In addition to the preparation of organo-europium compounds by metathesis reaction, metal europium can also be directly involved in the reaction, such as the reaction of europium and pentamethylcyclopentadiene to generate light orange bis(pentamethylcyclopentadiene) europium; and the reaction between cyclooctatetraene and europium gives the pale green cyclooctatetraene europium.

== Other compounds ==
Europium nitrate reacts with sodium hydroxide to form a precipitate of europium hydroxide. The reaction was irradiated with UV light at 365 nm.

Europium(II) sulfate is the sulfate of divalent europium, which can be obtained by electrolysis of europium sulfate solution with mercury as the cathode, or by reducing europium(III) chloride with zinc amalgam, and then reacting with sulfuric acid. It reacts with sodium carbonate or ammonium oxalate to obtain europium(II) carbonate and europium(II) oxalate, respectively:

EuSO_{4} + Na_{2}CO_{3} + xH_{2}O → EuCO_{3}·xH_{2}O + Na_{2}SO_{4}
EuSO_{4} + (NH_{4})_{2}C_{2}O_{4}(saturated) + H_{2}O → EuC_{2}O_{4}·H_{2}O + (NH_{4})_{2}SO_{4}

Europium(III) sulfate can be directly obtained by reacting europium(III) oxide and dilute sulfuric acid, and crystallized, and dehydration of hydrate can obtain the anhydrous form. Europium(III) sulfate is soluble in water, and its octahydrate has a solubility of 2.56 g at 20 °C. Europium(III) sulfite (Eu_{2}(SO_{3})_{3}·nH_{2}O，n=0, 3, 6) and its basic salt (EuOHSO_{3}·4H_{2}O) are known, and heating the sulfite in a carbon monoxide atmosphere will dehydrate to obtain the anhydrous form, and after Eu_{2}O_{2}SO_{4}, finally obtain the oxysulfide Eu_{2}O_{2}S.

Europium(II) hydroxide can be obtained by reacting metallic europium with sodium hydroxide. Europium(II) hydroxide belongs to the orthorhombic crystal system. It decomposes to form europium(III) hydroxide, a pale pink solid that reacts with acids and produces europium(III) salts. It can be prepared by reacting europium with water, or by reacting europium(III) nitrate with hexamethylenetetramine at 95 °C or with ammonium hydroxide.

Europium(III) nitrate can be obtained by reacting europium(III) oxide and nitric acid and crystallizing. The crystal is dried with 45~55% sulfuric acid to obtain hexahydrate. Its anhydrous form can be obtained by the reaction of europium oxide and dinitrogen tetroxide, while heating the hydrate can only obtain the basic salt EuONO_{3}. Europium(III) phosphate can be obtained by reacting europium(III) chloride and diammonium hydrogen phosphate (or europium(III) oxide and 5 mol/L phosphoric acid), and its white monohydrate precipitates from solution. It loses water at 600~800 °C, and changes from a hexagonal phase with water to an anhydrous monoclinic phase. Europium(III) oxide reacts with arsenic pentoxide to obtain europium(III) arsenate, which is a colorless crystal with a xenotime structure.

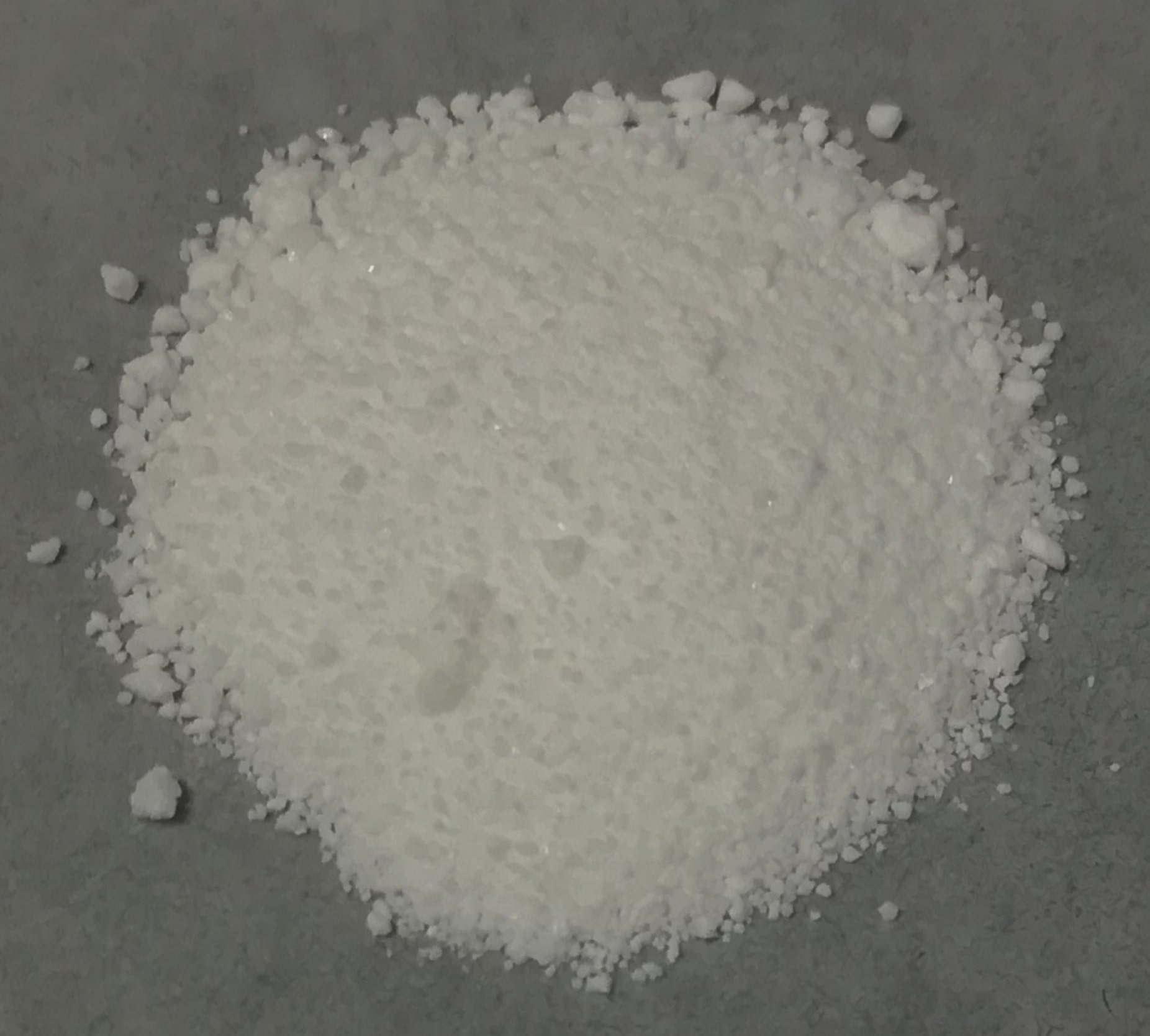
Europium(III) acetate powder

Europium(III) carbonate is one of the carbonates of europium, which can be obtained by reacting a dilute solution of sodium bicarbonate saturated with carbon dioxide with a soluble europium salt. It is heated and decomposed to generate europium(III) oxide and carbon dioxide. Its basic salts and double salts are known. Europium(III) acetate is a pale pink solid that can crystallize from an aqueous solution as the tetrahydrate, which is dried with sulfuric acid to give the trihydrate. The reaction of europium(III) nitrate and oxalic acid gave europium oxalate decahydrate, which was converted to pentahydrate at 100 °C. Using potassium oxalate as raw material can only get double salt KEu(C_{2}O_{4})_{2}·2H_{2}O. The coordination polymer [Eu(C_{2}O_{4})(HCOO)]_{n} can be obtained by reacting europium oxalate and oxalic acid with oxalic acid at 200 °C. Europium(III) oxalate is heated to 320 °C in a carbon dioxide atmosphere to obtain europium oxalate:

Eu_{2}(C_{2}O_{4})_{3} → 2 EuC_{2}O_{4} + 2 CO_{2}↑

== Applications ==
Compounds of Eu^{3+} can emit red light under excitation. For example, europium(III) oxide can be used in picture tube televisions and europium-doped yttrium oxysulfide (Y_{2}O_{2}S:Eu^{3+}) can be used as phosphors. In addition, europium compounds can also be used in the manufacture of anti-counterfeiting materials.

Based on the properties of europium(II) oxide, thin layers of europium(II) oxide deposited on silicon are being studied for use as spin filters. Spin filter materials only allow electrons of a certain spin to pass, blocking electrons of the opposite spin. The synthesis of europium(II) oxide, as well as its europium(II) sulfide, because of their potential as laser window materials, insulating ferromagnets, ferromagnetic semiconductors, and magnetoresistant, optomagnetic, and luminescent materials. Europium(II) sulfide was used in an experiment providing evidence of Majorana fermions relevant to quantum computing and the production of qubits.

Eu(OCC(CH_{3})_{3}CHCOC_{3}F_{7})_{3} (abbreviated Eu(fod)_{3}, where the fod ligand is the anion of the commercially available 6,6,7,7,8,8,8-heptafluoro-2,2-dimethyl-3,5-octanedione) serves as a Lewis acid catalyst in organic synthesis including stereoselective Diels-Alder and aldol addition reactions. For example, Eu(fod)_{3} catalyzes the cyclocondensations of substituted dienes with aromatic and aliphatic aldehydes to yield dihydropyrans, with high selectivity for the endo product.

== Gallery ==
Europium compounds
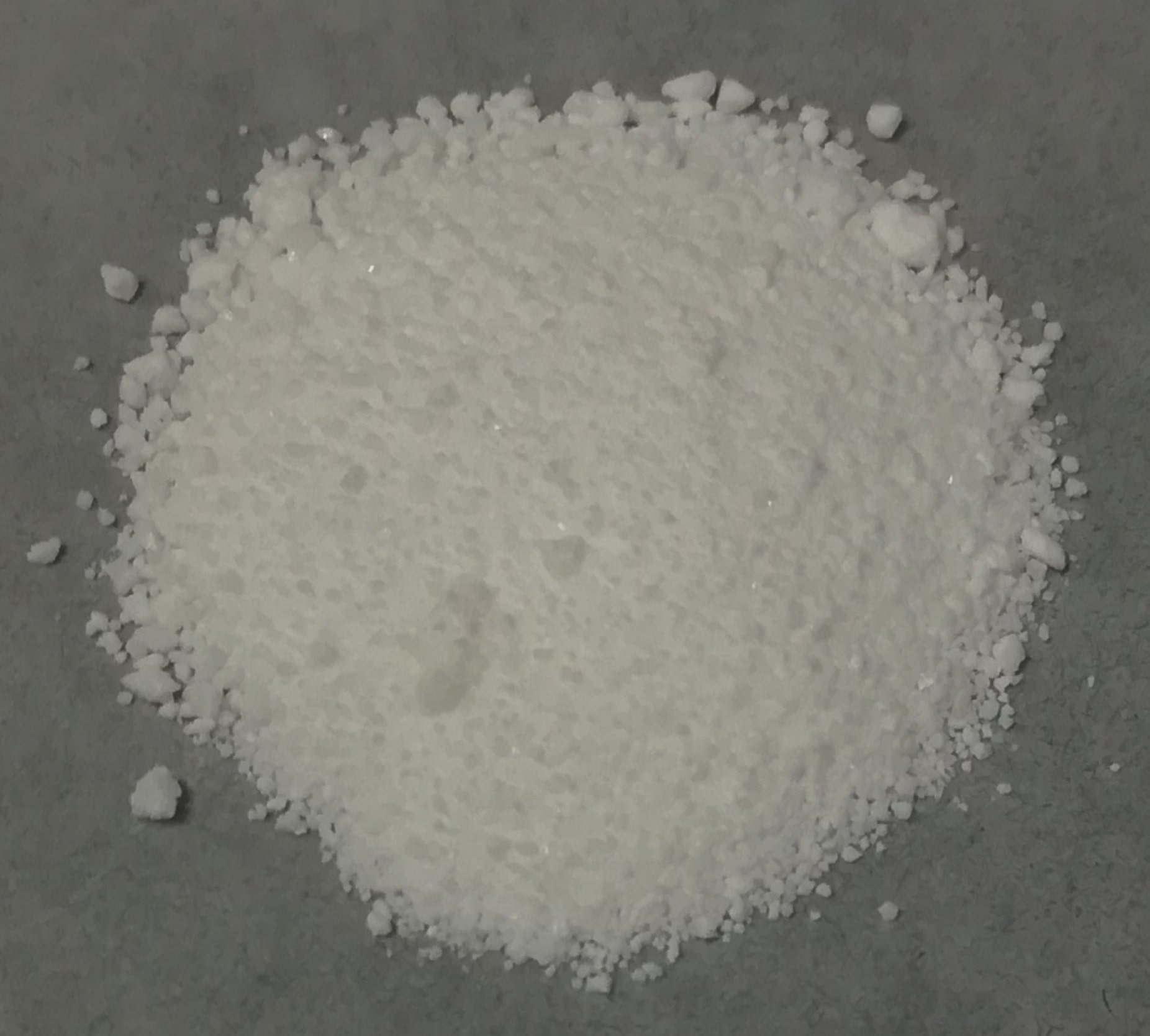
Europium acetate tetrahydrate (Eu(CH_{3}COO)_{3}·4H_{2}O)

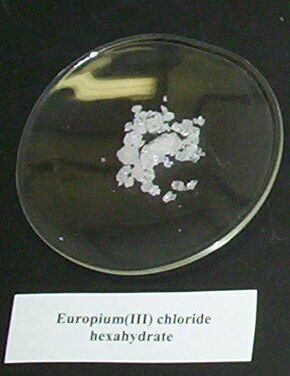
Europium(III) chloride hexahydrate (EuCl_{3}·6H_{2}O)

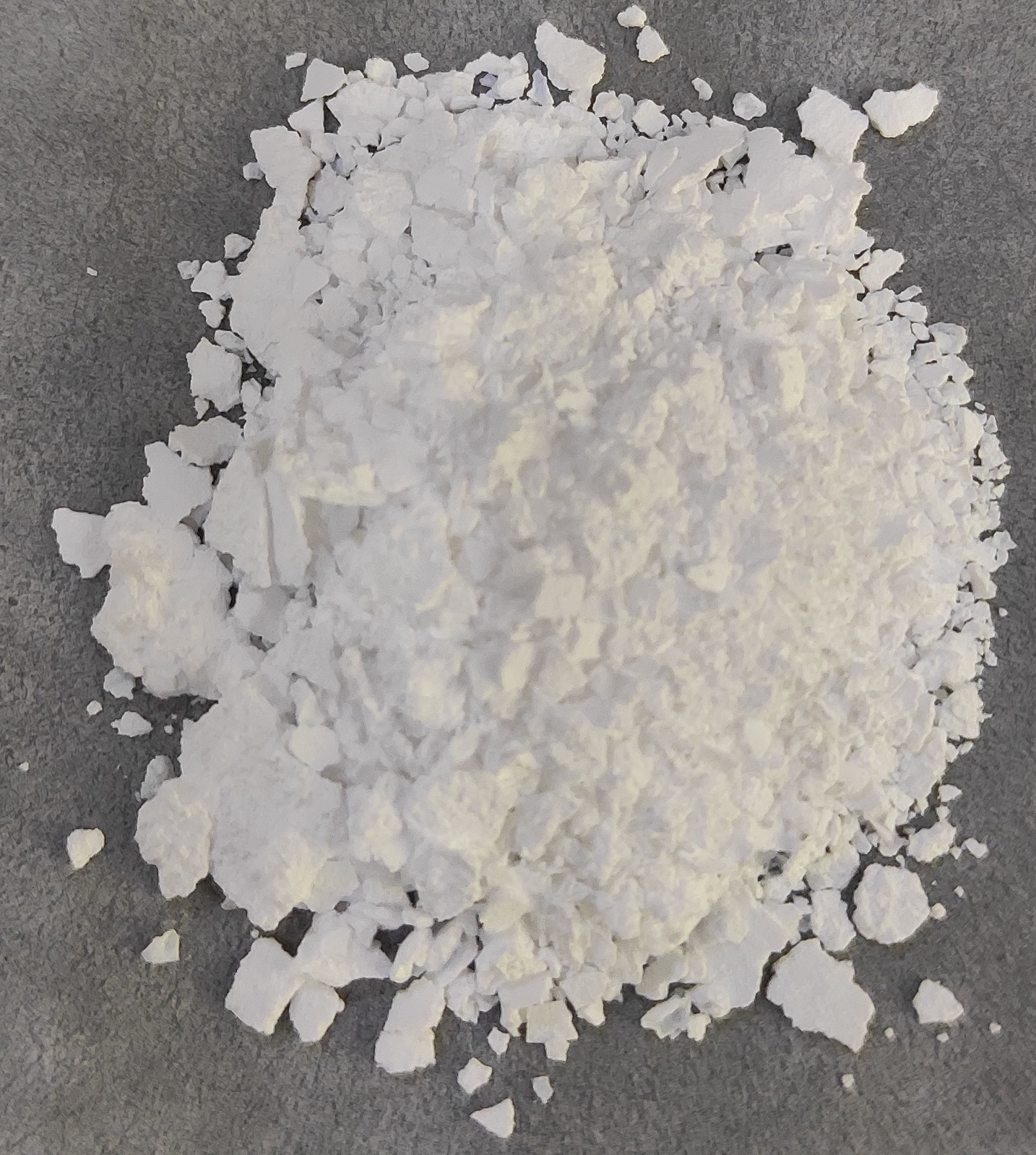
Europium(III) hydroxide (Eu(OH)_{3})

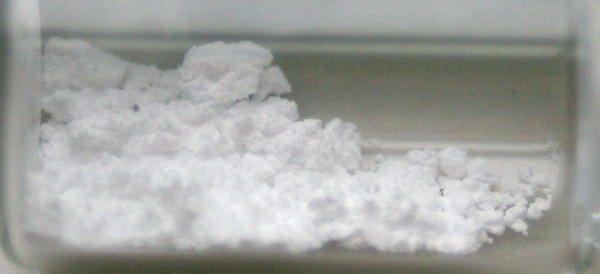
Europium(III) oxide (Eu_{2}O_{3})

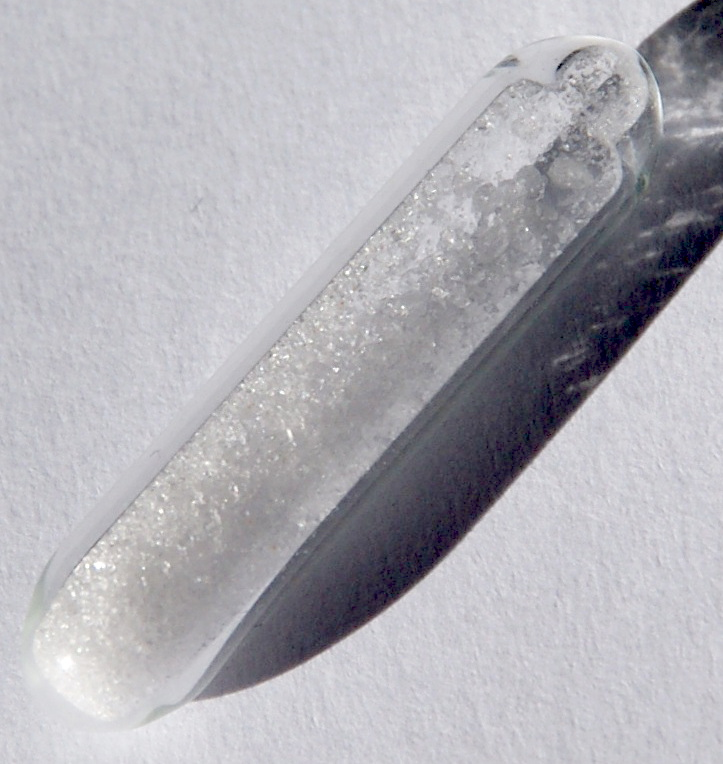
Europium(III) sulfate (Eu_{2}(SO_{4})_{3})

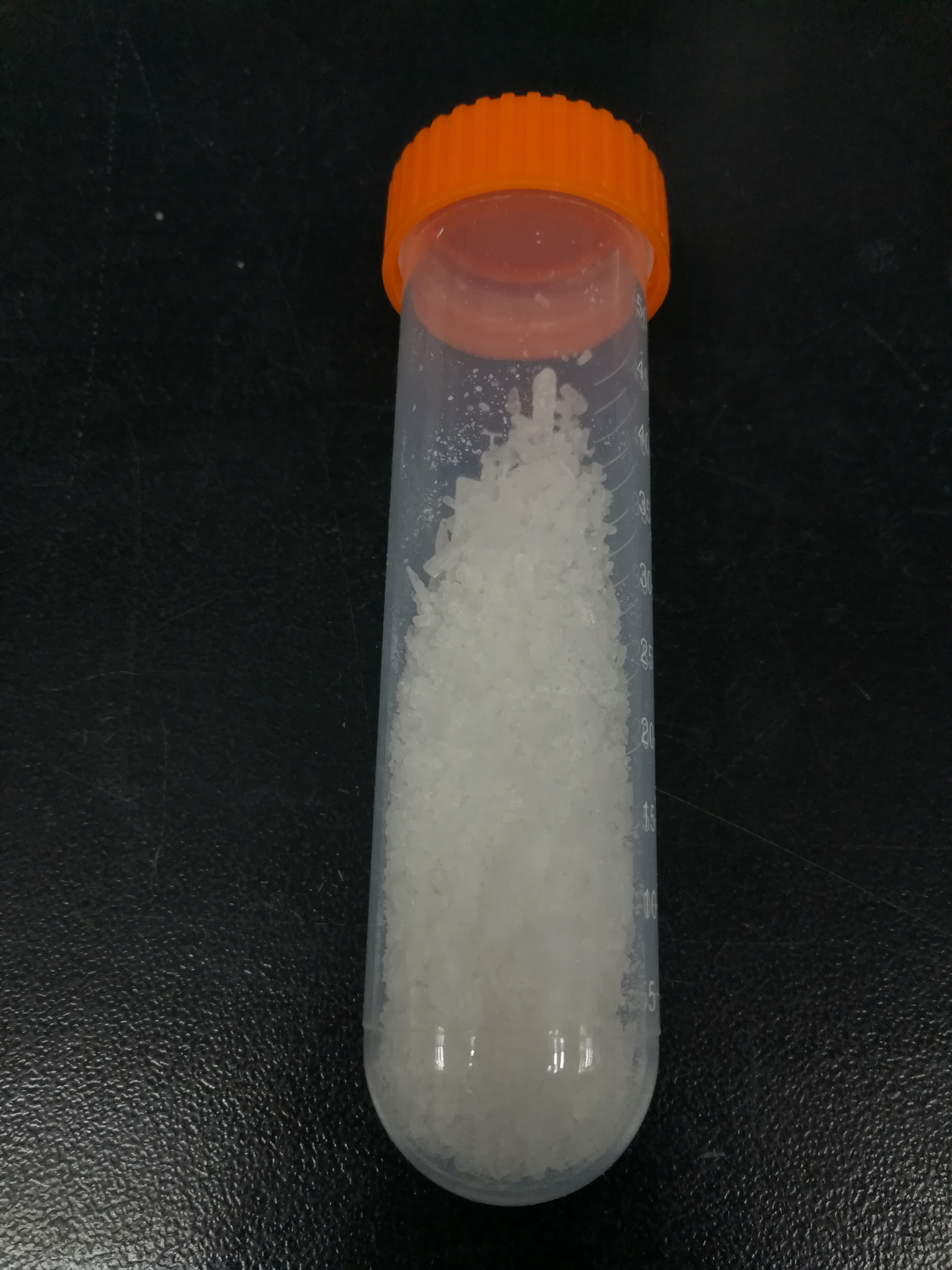
Europium nitrate hexahydrate (Eu(NO_{3})_{3}·6H_{2}O)

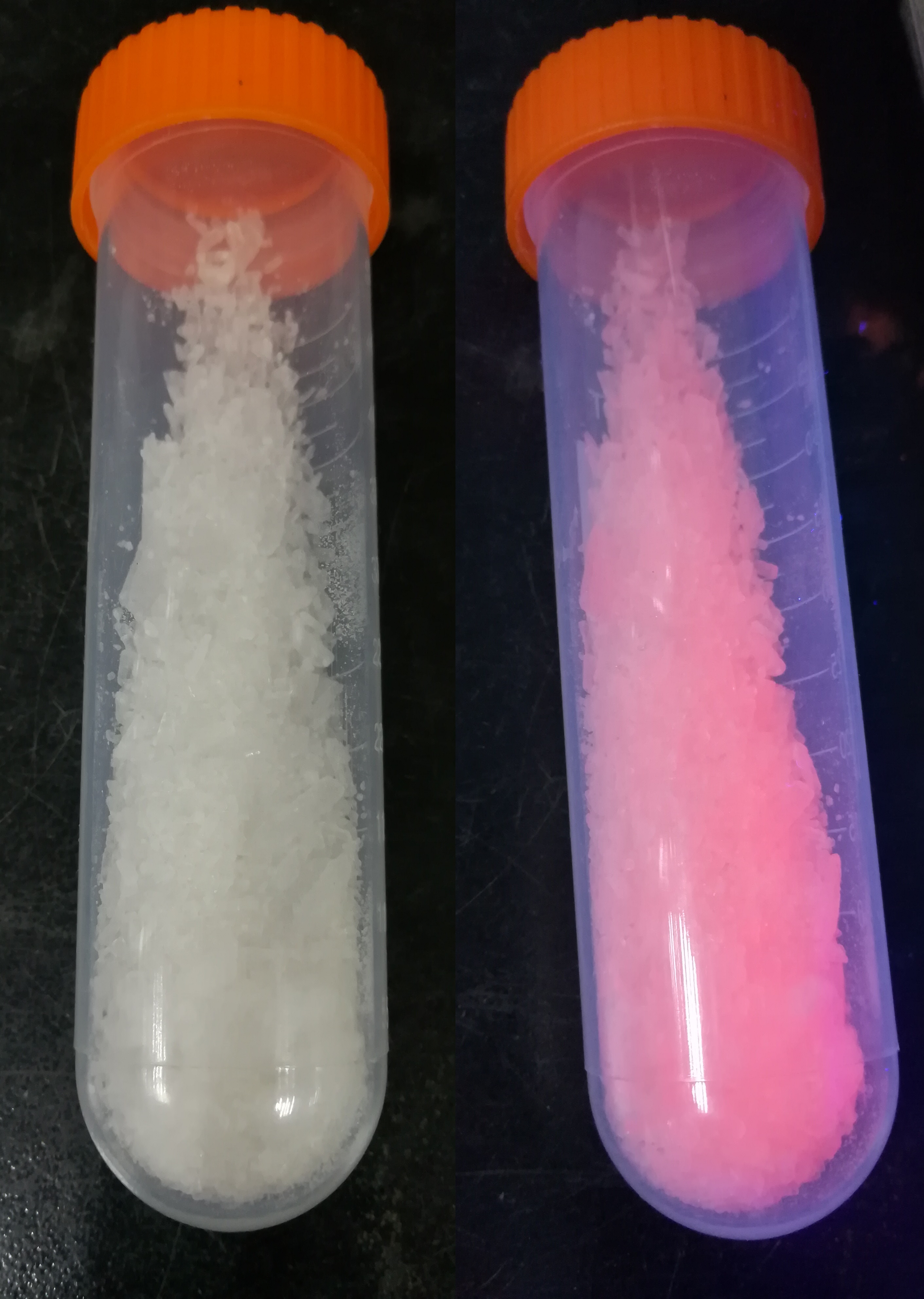
Europium nitrate under ultraviolet light at 365 nm

== See also ==
- Samarium compounds
- Terbium compounds
