= Samarium compounds =

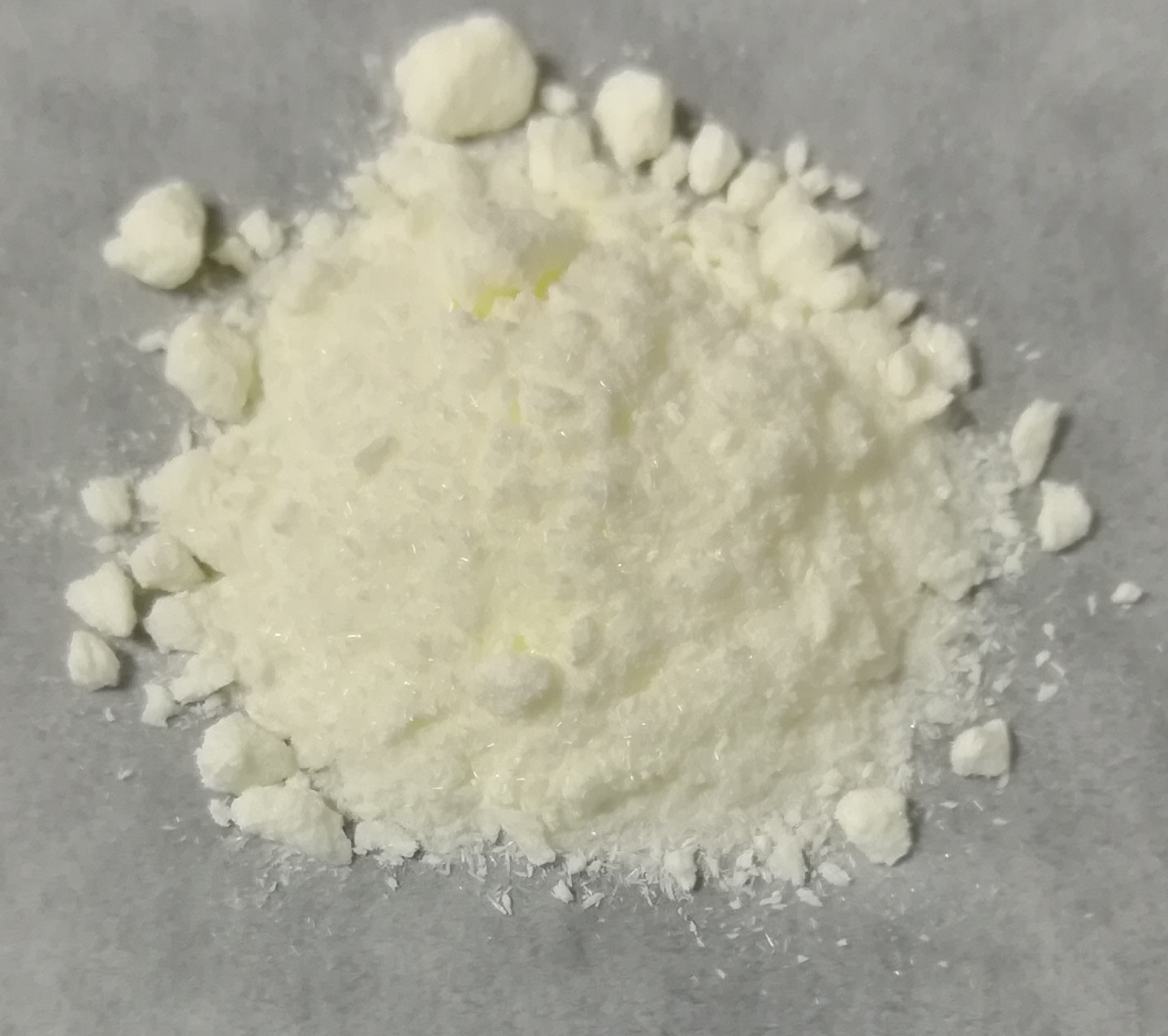
Samarium(III) acetate, a compound of samarium

Samarium compounds are compounds formed by the lanthanide metal samarium (Sm). Samarium most commonly occurs in the +3 oxidation state, as in Sm_{2}O_{3}, SmCl_{3} and Sm(NO_{3})_{3}. The +2 oxidation state is unusually accessible for a lanthanide and gives rise to an extensive chemistry of divalent halides, chalcogenides, coordination compounds and organometallic compounds. Among these, samarium(II) iodide (SmI_{2}) is widely used as a single-electron reducing agent in organic synthesis.

Samarium forms a broad range of binary compounds, including oxides, hydrides, halides, chalcogenides, borides, carbides, silicides and pnictides, as well as numerous coordination and organosamarium compounds. Several display unusual electronic behaviour associated with changes in samarium valence. Samarium(II) sulfide undergoes a pressure-induced transition from a black semiconducting state to a golden metallic state, while samarium hexaboride is an intermediate-valence Kondo insulator studied for its low-temperature electronic properties. Samarium compounds also have practical uses in organic synthesis, catalysis and optical materials, while samarium–cobalt intermetallic compounds are important high-temperature permanent-magnet materials.

== Properties of samarium compounds ==
Formula	Colour	Crystal system	Space group	No	Pearson symbol	a (pm)	b (pm)	c (pm)	Z	Density, g/cm^{3}
Sm	silvery	trigonal	R3̅m	166	hR9	362.9	362.9	2621.3	9	7.52
Sm	silvery	hexagonal	P6_{3}/mmc	194	hP4	362	362	1168	4	7.54
Sm	silvery	tetragonal	I4/mmm	139	tI2	240.2	240.2	423.1	2	20.46
SmO	golden	cubic	Fm3̅m	225	cF8	494.3	494.3	494.3	4	9.15
Sm_{2}O_{3}		trigonal	P3̅m1	164	hP5	377.8	377.8	594	1	7.89
Sm_{2}O_{3}		monoclinic	C2/m	12	mS30	1418	362.4	885.5	6	7.76
Sm_{2}O_{3}		cubic	Ia3̅	206	cI80	1093	1093	1093	16	7.1
SmH_{2}		cubic	Fm3̅m	225	cF12	537.73	537.73	537.73	4	6.51
SmH_{3}		hexagonal	P3̅c1	165	hP24	377.1	377.1	667.2	6	
Sm_{2}B_{5}	gray	monoclinic	P2_{1}/c	14	mP28	717.9	718	720.5	4	6.49
SmB_{2}		hexagonal	P6/mmm	191	hP3	331	331	401.9	1	7.49
SmB_{4}		tetragonal	P4/mbm	127	tP20	717.9	717.9	406.7	4	6.14
SmB_{6}		cubic	Pm3̅m	221	cP7	413.4	413.4	413.4	1	5.06
SmB_{66}		cubic	Fm3̅c	226	cF1936	2348.7	2348.7	2348.7	24	2.66
Sm_{2}C_{3}		cubic	I4̅3d	220	cI40	839.89	839.89	839.89	8	7.55
SmC_{2}		tetragonal	I4/mmm	139	tI6	377	377	633.1	2	6.44
SmF_{2}	purple	cubic	Fm3̅m	225	cF12	587.1	587.1	587.1	4	6.18
SmF_{3}	white	orthorhombic	Pnma	62	oP16	667.22	705.85	440.43	4	6.64
SmCl_{2}	brown	orthorhombic	Pnma	62	oP12	756.28	450.77	901.09	4	4.79
SmCl_{3}	yellow	hexagonal	P6_{3}/m	176	hP8	737.33	737.33	416.84	2	4.35
SmBr_{2}	brown	orthorhombic	Pnma	62	oP12	797.7	475.4	950.6	4	5.72
SmBr_{3}	yellow	orthorhombic	Cmcm	63	oS16	404	1265	908	2	5.58
SmI_{2}	green	monoclinic	P2_{1}/c	14	mP12					
SmI_{3}	orange	trigonal	R3̅	148	hR24	749	749	2080	6	5.24
SmN		cubic	Fm3̅m	225	cF8	357	357	357	4	8.48
SmP		cubic	Fm3̅m	225	cF8	576	576	576	4	6.3
SmAs		cubic	Fm3̅m	225	cF8	591.5	591.5	591.5	4	7.23

== Chalcogenides ==
=== Oxides ===
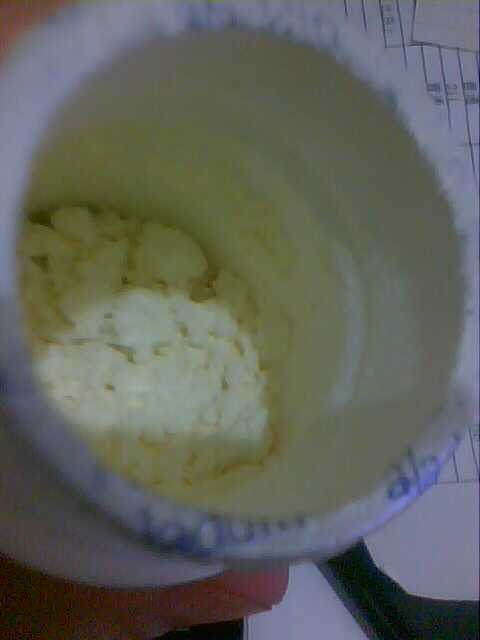
Samarium sesquioxide

The most stable oxide of samarium is the sesquioxide Sm_{2}O_{3}, which exists in several crystalline modifications. The trigonal form can be obtained by slow cooling from the melt. Because Sm_{2}O_{3} has a high melting point of about 2345 °C, it is generally melted by induction heating using a radio-frequency coil rather than by direct heating. Crystals of the monoclinic modification can be grown from Sm_{2}O_{3} powder by the flame-fusion (Verneuil) method, producing cylindrical boules several centimetres long and about one centimetre in diameter. These are transparent when pure and defect-free, but orange when defects are present. Heating the metastable trigonal modification to about 1900 °C converts it to the more stable monoclinic form. A cubic modification of Sm_{2}O_{3} has also been described.

Samarium is one of the few lanthanides known to form a monoxide, SmO. This lustrous golden-yellow compound can be obtained by reducing Sm_{2}O_{3} with samarium metal at about 1000 °C under pressures above 50 kbar; at lower pressures the reaction is incomplete. SmO crystallizes in the cubic rock salt structure.

=== Other chalcogenides ===
Samarium forms several sulfides in addition to SmS. The sesquisulfide Sm_{2}S_{3}, containing Sm^{3+}, is polymorphic. The A- or α-modification is orthorhombic with space group Pnma, whereas the C- or γ-modification has a cubic, cation-deficient Th_{3}P_{4}-type structure with space group I4̅3d. The former can be obtained by oxidation of SmCl_{2} with sulfur in a sodium chloride flux, while the latter has been prepared by reaction of the elements under related conditions. A mixed-valence sulfide, Sm_{3}S_{4}, is also known. It adopts the Th_{3}P_{4} structure and contains samarium in both the +2 and +3 oxidation states.

The corresponding sesquiselenide Sm_{2}Se_{3} is likewise polymorphic. Chemical-transport reactions have yielded red-brown crystals of a cation-deficient Th_{3}P_{4}-type modification with space group I4̅3d, as well as black crystals of an orthorhombic U_{2}S_{3}-type modification with space group Pnma. The trivalent telluride Sm_{2}Te_{3} is also known.

The divalent monochalcogenides SmS, SmSe and SmTe crystallize in the cubic rock-salt structure and are narrow-gap semiconductors at ambient pressure. Their unusual electronic properties arise from the accessibility of the Sm^{2+} and Sm^{3+} configurations, and all three undergo pressure-induced changes toward metallic, intermediate-valence states.

The transition is particularly abrupt in SmS. At room temperature it occurs at about 6.5 kbar and is accompanied by a change from the black semiconducting state to a golden, much more conductive state. The rock-salt symmetry is retained, but the unit-cell volume decreases by about 13.5%, reflecting the change from predominantly divalent samarium toward an intermediate-valence state. Mechanical pressure produced by scratching or polishing can produce the same characteristic golden coloration at the surface. SmSe and SmTe undergo analogous but continuous electronic transitions over considerably broader and higher pressure ranges. SmS additionally exhibits hysteresis: after compression, the semiconducting phase is recovered at a substantially lower pressure than that required to induce the metallic state.

== Halides ==
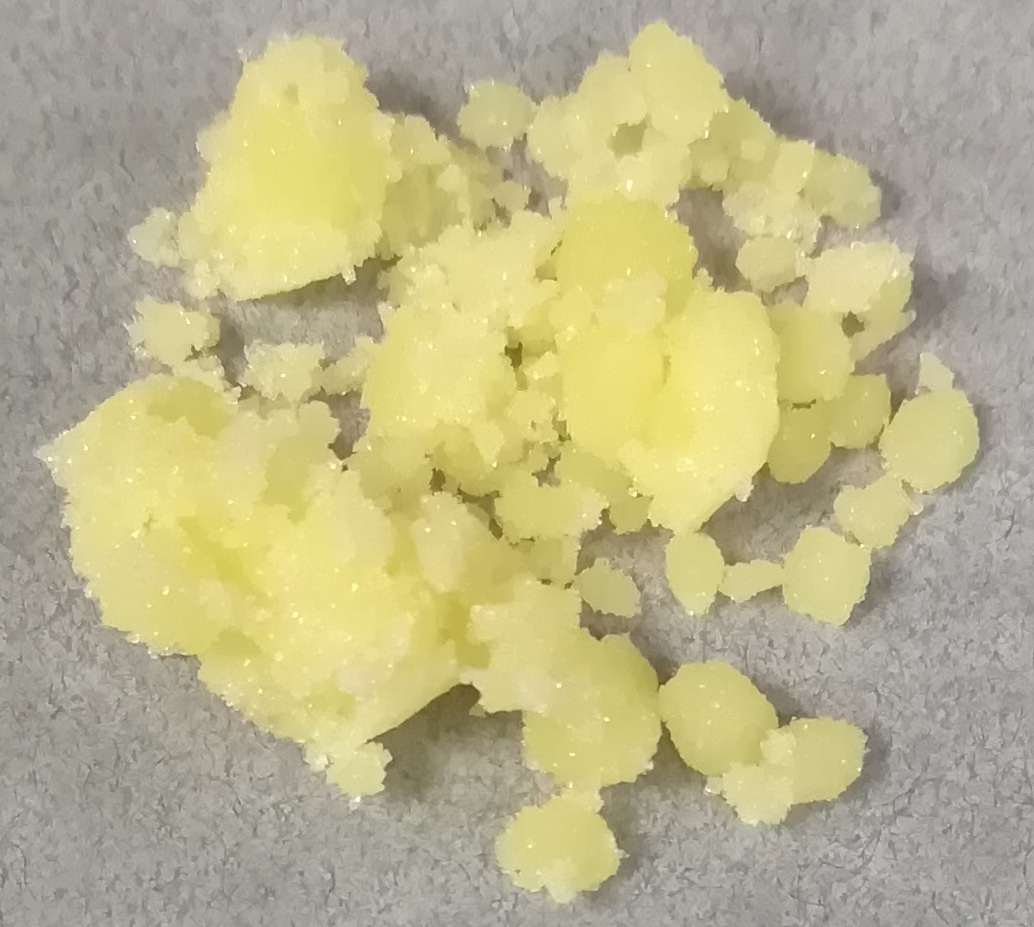
Samarium trichloride hexahydrate

Samarium forms both trivalent and divalent binary halides. Reaction of the metal with the halogens gives the trihalides SmX_{3} (X = F, Cl, Br or I):

2 Sm + 3 X_{2} → 2 SmX_{3}

Their crystal structures vary across the series. SmF_{3} is orthorhombic, while SmCl_{3} adopts the hexagonal UCl_{3} structure type and SmBr_{3} the orthorhombic PuBr_{3} type. Samarium(III) iodide belongs instead to the layered BiI_{3} structure type characteristic of the heavier lanthanide triiodides.

The +2 oxidation state is considerably more accessible for samarium than for most lanthanides, and all four samarium dihalides SmF_{2}, SmCl_{2}, SmBr_{2} and SmI_{2} are known. Reduction of the trihalides with samarium, lithium or sodium at about 700–900 °C gives the corresponding lower halides. SmF_{2} crystallizes in the cubic fluorite structure, whereas SmCl_{2} and SmBr_{2} have orthorhombic structures. The diiodide can also be prepared by heating SmI_{3}, or by reaction of samarium metal with 1,2-diiodoethane in anhydrous tetrahydrofuran at room temperature:

Sm + ICH_{2}CH_{2}I → SmI_{2} + CH_{2}=CH_{2}

The samarium–halogen systems also contain intermediate phases between the formal +2 and +3 compositions. In the fluoride system these include Sm_{3}F_{7}, Sm_{14}F_{33} and Sm_{27}F_{64}. Three closely spaced phases occur between SmBr_{2} and SmBr_{3}, with compositions Sm_{6}Br_{13}, Sm_{11}Br_{24} and Sm_{5}Br_{11}. Their structures are related to the fluorite structure and accommodate additional bromide ions in long-period superstructures.

Several samarium halides are polymorphic under pressure or at elevated temperature. Compression of the usual monoclinic form of SmI_{2}, followed by decompression, produces an orthorhombic PbCl2-type modification with a density of 5.90 g/cm^{3}. High-pressure treatment likewise produces a denser modification of SmI_{3}, with a reported density of 5.97 g/cm^{3}.

== Hydrides ==
Samarium reacts directly with hydrogen to form non-stoichiometric hydrides of approximate composition SmH^{+}_{2}x. Hydrogen uptake is strongly dependent on the physical state of the metal: powdered samarium begins to absorb hydrogen rapidly at about 300–330 °C, whereas bulk samples may require temperatures up to about 525 °C. Compositions as hydrogen-rich as approximately SmH_{2.63} have been obtained by direct hydrogenation. The hydrides are sensitive to air and can partially decompose to samarium oxide under ambient conditions.

The samarium–hydrogen system contains several distinct phases between the nominal dihydride and trihydride compositions. The fluorite-related cubic phase extends approximately over SmH_{1.95}^{−}_{2.30}, while a hydrogen-rich hexagonal, tysonite-related phase occurs around SmH_{2.82}^{−}_{2.90}. An intermediate phase, Sm_{3}H_{7}, has a tetragonally distorted fluorite-related structure analogous to that of Sm_{3}F_{7}. Similar phase relationships occur in the corresponding deuterides. The structural chemistry follows the general hydride–fluoride analogy found among lanthanides; unlike europium, however, samarium is readily oxidized from Sm^{2+} toward Sm^{3+} as the hydrogen content increases.

At elevated pressure, samarium trihydride undergoes a reversible transformation from its ambient-pressure hexagonal structure to a cubic high-pressure phase. Much more hydrogen-rich phases have also been obtained at megabar pressures. In 2026, laser heating samarium with ammonia borane in diamond-anvil cells produced phases assigned as SmH_{9}, SmH_{6}, SmH_{4}, SmH_{3}, SmH_{2} and hydrogen-deficient SmH^{−}_{2}x. The higher hydrides were metallic under the conditions studied, but no superconducting transition was observed.

== Borides ==
Samarium forms several binary borides spanning a wide range of boron content. Early phase-equilibrium studies of the Sm–B system identified a samarium-rich phase of approximate composition SmB_{2}, together with SmB_{4}, SmB_{6} and the boron-rich phase SmB_{66}. The tetraboride and hexaboride have measurable homogeneity ranges, and the hardness of the phases generally increases with increasing boron content. A further boride, Sm_{2}B_{5}, has also been structurally characterized.

SmB_{2} is difficult to obtain under ordinary conditions because more boron-rich phases are preferentially formed. It has been synthesized at high pressure and high temperature and adopts the hexagonal AlB_{2} structure type, with lattice parameters a = 0.3310 nm and c = 0.4019 nm. SmB_{4} crystallizes in the tetragonal ThB_{4} structure type. It undergoes antiferromagnetic ordering near 25 K, with a second low-temperature anomaly near 7 K.

Powder mixtures of samarium oxide and boron can be sintered under vacuum to give mixtures of boride phases, whose proportions depend on the starting composition. Larger crystals of SmB_{4}, SmB_{6} and SmB_{66} can be produced by arc or zone melting, taking advantage of their different melting and crystallization behaviour. These borides are dark, hard and brittle, with hardness generally increasing with boron content.

=== Samarium hexaboride ===
Samarium hexaboride, SmB_{6}, crystallizes in the cubic CaB_{6} structure type, in which B_{6} octahedra form a three-dimensional boron framework surrounding the samarium atoms. It is an intermediate valence compound: the samarium 4f configuration fluctuates between states conventionally described as Sm^{2+} and Sm^{3+}, giving an average valence of about +2.6 near room temperature rather than distinct crystallographic Sm^{2+} and Sm^{3+} sites.

At high temperature SmB_{6} has comparatively conductive behaviour, but on cooling the hybridization of localized 4f states with conduction states opens a narrow gap and the bulk becomes insulating. It is therefore a prototypical Kondo insulator. Spectroscopic measurements find energy scales of several to several tens of millielectronvolts associated with the hybridization gap, depending on the experimental method. The decrease in the number of mobile bulk charge carriers is accompanied by a marked rise in thermal conductivity at low temperature, with a maximum near 15 K.

Below a few kelvin, the electrical resistance of SmB_{6} does not continue to increase as expected for a conventional bulk insulator, but instead approaches a plateau associated with electrically conducting surface states. Transport and photoemission experiments have reported surface states consistent with a topological origin, and SmB_{6} is widely studied as a candidate topological Kondo insulator. Some aspects of the low-temperature bulk state nevertheless remain unresolved, including the origin of reported in-gap states and quantum oscillations.

== Carbides and silicides ==
Samarium forms several binary carbides. They can be prepared by high-temperature reaction of samarium metal with graphite under an inert atmosphere; the products are sensitive to air and are generally handled under inert conditions. The best established phases are samarium dicarbide, SmC_{2}, and the sesquicarbide, conventionally written Sm_{2}C_{3}. SmC_{2} is a brittle solid with a metallic golden lustre and crystallizes in the tetragonal calcium carbide structure, space group I4/mmm, with lattice parameters of about a = 0.376 nm and c = 0.634 nm.

The sesquicarbide has the cubic Pu_{2}C_{3}-type structure. More detailed phase-equilibrium studies found it to be appreciably carbon-deficient rather than exactly stoichiometric Sm_{2}C_{3}, with a composition range approximately SmC_{1.36}–SmC_{1.45}. Its composition also varies with temperature. Earlier studies also reported a samarium-rich carbide Sm_{3}C with a cubic Fe4N-type structure. Its existence as a binary carbide has subsequently been disputed: reinvestigation of the Sm–C–O system failed to reproduce binary Sm_{3}C and instead identified a samarium oxycarbide with similar structural parameters.

Samarium also forms a series of silicides. The established binary phases in the Sm–Si system include Sm_{5}Si_{3}, Sm_{5}Si_{4}, SmSi, Sm_{3}Si_{5} and SmSi_{2}. They can be prepared by high-temperature reaction or annealing of mixtures of the elements. Samarium monosilicide adopts an orthorhombic FeB-type structure, while Sm_{5}Si_{3} belongs to the hexagonal Mn_{5}Si_{3} structure type. Compounds at the 5:4 and 5:3 compositions have also been studied together with the corresponding rare-earth germanides.

Samarium disilicide, SmSi_{2}, occurs in two principal crystalline modifications. The low-temperature α-form is orthorhombic, whereas the β-form is tetragonal with the α^{−}ThSi_{2} structure; the transformation occurs at about 380 °C. SmSi_{2} melts congruently at approximately 1800 °C.

== Pnictides ==
Samarium forms the complete series of equiatomic monopnictides SmN, SmP, SmAs, SmSb and SmBi. All crystallize in the cubic rock salt structure, with samarium predominantly in the +3 oxidation state, although their electronic and magnetic properties vary substantially across the series.

Samarium nitride, SmN, can be prepared by direct reaction of samarium metal with nitrogen. It has the rock-salt structure with a lattice parameter of 0.50481 nm. SmN is a ferromagnetic semiconductor with a Curie temperature of about 27 K. Its ordered magnetic moment is unusually small because the orbital and spin contributions of the Sm^{3+} 4f electrons are oppositely directed and largely cancel one another.

Samarium monophosphide, SmP, is a semiconductor with a band gap of about 1.1 eV. It can be prepared by annealing a mixture of samarium and phosphorus in an evacuated ampoule at about 1100 °C. SmAs is likewise a rock-salt monopnictide. Its electronic state is closely related to the valence-instability characteristic of samarium compounds: in solid solutions of SmAs with divalent SmSe, the average samarium valence changes continuously from predominantly Sm^{2+} to Sm^{3+} as the arsenide content is increased.

The heavier monopnictides SmSb and SmBi are low-carrier-density semimetals and order antiferromagnetically at low temperatures. SmSb has a Néel temperature of about 2.1 K and exhibits Kondo-like behaviour in its low-temperature specific heat and magnetic susceptibility. SmBi also has the rock-salt structure and undergoes antiferromagnetic ordering at about 9 K.

Other stoichiometries occur particularly among the heavier pnictides. Samarium diantimonide, SmSb_{2}, is the prototype of the orthorhombic SmSb_{2} structure type (space group No. 64). Its structure contains two-dimensional rectangular nets of antimony atoms separated by samarium-containing layers, resulting in strongly anisotropic electronic properties.

== Other inorganic compounds ==
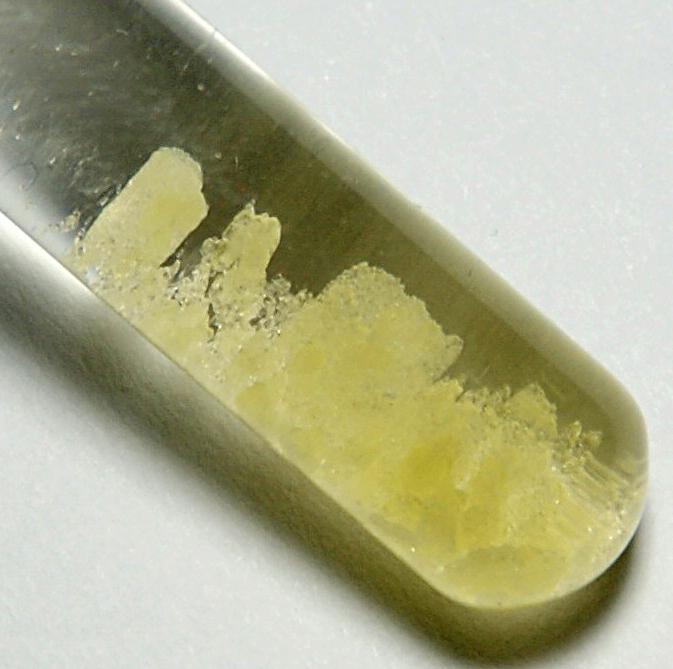
Samarium sulfate, Sm_{2}(SO_{4})_{3}

Samarium(III) hydroxide, Sm(OH)_{3}, can be precipitated from aqueous Sm^{3+} solutions with hydroxide ions. It crystallizes in a hexagonal structure and can be converted by calcination to Sm_{2}O_{3} while largely retaining the morphology of the hydroxide precursor. Samarium oxyhydroxide, SmOOH, is also known. It crystallizes in the monoclinic space group P2_{1}/m, with lattice parameters a = 0.4356 nm, b = 0.3766 nm, c = 0.6139 nm and β = 108.464°. Millimetre-scale yellowish crystals have been grown from molten alkali hydroxides.

Several common oxyanion salts of Sm^{3+} form hydrated crystals. Samarium(III) nitrate is commonly encountered as the hexahydrate Sm(NO_{3})_{3}·6H_{2}O. On heating, it loses water in several stages and subsequently forms Sm(OH)(NO_{3})_{2} and crystalline SmO(NO_{3}) before decomposition to Sm_{2}O_{3} at about 520 °C.

Samarium(III) oxalate precipitates readily from aqueous Sm^{3+} solutions and can be isolated as the decahydrate Sm_{2}(C_{2}O_{4})_{3}·10H_{2}O. The hydrate crystallizes in the monoclinic space group P2_{1}/c; transparent yellowish single crystals have been grown by gel diffusion. It loses its water on heating and ultimately decomposes to samarium(III) oxide; the anhydrous oxalate is thermally unstable and decomposition to the oxide is complete at about 645 °C.

Hydrated samarium(III) sulfates are also known. The pentahydrate Sm_{2}(SO_{4})_{3}(H_{2}O)_{5} crystallizes in the monoclinic space group C2/c; each samarium centre is coordinated by eight oxygen atoms from sulfate groups and water molecules, and the sulfate groups link the samarium coordination polyhedra into a three-dimensional framework.

Samarium orthophosphate, SmPO_{4}, has the monoclinic monazite structure, space group P2_{1}/n. It can be prepared by precipitation from aqueous samarium and phosphate solutions followed by heating, as well as by hydrothermal and solid-state methods.

Samarium(III) acetate, Sm(CH_{3}COO)_{3}, also forms several hydrates. The tetrahydrate begins to dehydrate at about 70 °C, passing through lower hydrates. Anhydrous samarium acetate is strongly hygroscopic and on further heating decomposes through oxycarbonate-containing intermediates to samarium(III) oxide.

== Coordination compounds ==
Like other lanthanides, samarium forms predominantly ionic coordination compounds with relatively high coordination numbers and a preference for hard donor atoms, especially oxygen. Sm^{3+} is the more common oxidation state, but the accessibility of Sm^{2+} gives samarium an unusually extensive low-valent coordination chemistry. The coordination sphere can vary substantially with ligand size and solvent.

An example of a Sm^{3+} macrocyclic complex is [SmI_{3}(dibenzo^{−}^{−}_{18}crown^{−}_{6})], obtained by reaction of samarium(III) iodide with dibenzo-18-crown-6 in acetonitrile. The samarium ion lies within the crown-ether cavity and is nine-coordinate, bonded to three iodide ions and all six oxygen atoms of the crown ether.

The coordination chemistry of Sm^{2+} is especially important because it strongly affects the properties of samarium(II) iodide. Crystallization from tetrahydrofuran gives SmI_{2}(THF)_{5}, in which samarium is seven-coordinate with a pentagonal-bipyramidal environment: the two iodide ligands occupy the axial positions and five THF oxygen atoms form the equatorial plane. Related mixed-solvent complexes SmI_{2}(DME)_{2}(THF) and SmI_{2}(DME)(THF)_{3} have the same overall seven-coordinate arrangement. The coordination environment is highly sensitive to additives: X-ray absorption studies of SmI_{2} in THF–water mixtures showed that addition of at least eight equivalents of water leads to dissociation of the Sm–I interactions and formation of hydrated Sm^{2+} species.

More elaborate ligands can stabilize discrete low-valent complexes. β-Diketiminate ligands, for example, give Sm^{2+} iodide complexes whose aggregation depends strongly on the amount of coordinated THF: removal of solvent from [Sm(Nacnac)I(THF)_{2}] produces di-, tri- and tetranuclear species, while reaction of solvent-free SmI_{2} with two equivalents of the ligand gives mononuclear [Sm(Nacnac)_{2}].

== Organosamarium compounds ==
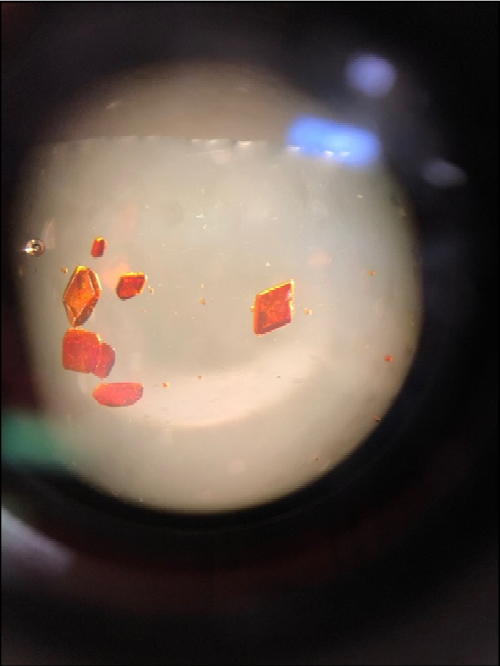
Crystals of a substituted samarium cyclopentadienyl complex

=== Cyclopentadienyl complexes ===
Samarium forms both Sm^{3+} and Sm^{2+} cyclopentadienyl complexes. The classical trivalent compound Sm(C_{5}H_{5})_{3} and its chlorinated derivatives Sm(C_{5}H_{5})_{2}Cl and Sm(C_{5}H_{5})Cl_{2} can be prepared by reacting samarium trichloride with NaC_{5}H_{5} in tetrahydrofuran. Unlike many simple lanthanide cyclopentadienides, Sm(C_{5}H_{5})_{3} forms a polymeric structure in which some cyclopentadienyl ligands bridge neighbouring samarium centres through η^{1} or η^{2} interactions. Sm(C_{5}H_{5})_{2}Cl is dimeric, with two bridging chloride ligands; the bridging groups can be replaced by iodide, hydride and other ligands.

The cyclopentadienyl ligand can also be replaced by related aromatic ligands. Known examples include the indenyl compound Sm(C_{9}H_{7})_{3} and the cyclooctatetraenyl complex KSm(η(_{8})−C_{8}H_{8})_{2}, whose sandwich structure is related to that of uranocene. Divalent samarium also forms Sm(C_{5}H_{5})_{2}, a volatile solid in which the two cyclopentadienyl rings are not parallel but are tilted by about 40°.

In 1981, (C_{5}Me_{5})_{2}Sm(THF)_{2} was isolated as the first soluble organometallic Sm^{2+} complex, containing the bulky pentamethylcyclopentadienyl ligand (Cp*). It was the first soluble organometallic Sm^{2+} complex and provided access to the strong reducing chemistry of divalent samarium in a molecular organometallic environment. The unsolvated complex (C_{5}Me_{5})_{2}Sm, often called decamethylsamarocene, was isolated three years later as a monomeric bent metallocene. Reduction of dinitrogen by this complex subsequently gave [(C_{5}Me_{5})_{2}Sm]_{2}N_{2}, the first crystallographically characterized dinitrogen complex of an f-block element.

=== σ-Bonded compounds ===
Samarium also forms compounds containing localized Sm–C σ bonds. Salt-metathesis reactions in tetrahydrofuran or diethyl ether can give alkyl and aryl derivatives of Sm^{3+}:

SmCl_{3} + 3 LiR → SmR_{3} + 3 LiCl

and bulky alkyl ligands can be introduced from organolithium reagents:

Sm(OR)_{3} + 3 LiCH(SiMe_{3})_{2} → Sm{CH(SiMe_{3})_{2}}_{3} + 3 LiOR

where R is a hydrocarbon group and Me denotes methyl. Steric bulk is important because simple lanthanide alkyls frequently undergo aggregation or decomposition.

Well-defined σ-bonded derivatives can also be obtained from divalent metallocenes. Reaction of (C_{5}Me_{5})_{2}Sm(THF)_{2} with trimethylaluminium gives samarium methyl compounds, including the monomeric Sm^{3+} complex (C_{5}Me_{5})_{2}SmMe(THF) and a methyl-bridged Sm–Al dimer.

Transient organosamarium compounds are also central to the organic chemistry of SmI_{2}. Successive one-electron reduction of an alkyl halide can convert an initially formed carbon radical into an organosamarium species, which can then react with electrophiles. Such intermediates participate in samarium-mediated Barbier, Grignard-type, Reformatsky and aldol reactions and can tolerate functional groups that are incompatible with more strongly basic lithium- or magnesium-based organometallic reagents.

== Alloys and intermetallic compounds ==
Samarium forms numerous intermetallic compounds with transition metals. The samarium–cobalt system is particularly rich: binary phases reported across the composition range include Sm_{3}Co, Sm_{9}Co_{4}, SmCo_{2}, SmCo_{3}, Sm_{2}Co_{7}, SmCo_{5} and Sm_{2}Co_{17}. Many rare-earth–transition-metal structures in this composition range can be related structurally to the hexagonal CaCu_{5} structure by ordered replacement of rare-earth atoms by pairs of transition-metal atoms.

=== Samarium–cobalt intermetallics ===
The most prominent samarium–cobalt compounds are SmCo_{5} and Sm_{2}Co_{17}, which form the structural basis of commercially important samarium–cobalt permanent magnets. SmCo_{5} crystallizes in the hexagonal CaCu_{5} structure type, space group P6/mmm, in which samarium occupies one crystallographic site and cobalt occupies two nonequivalent sites. It is strongly ferromagnetic and has a Curie temperature above 1000 K; neutron-diffraction measurements give a Curie temperature of about 1020 K.

The structures of the cobalt-richer phases can be described in relation to SmCo_{5} by replacing samarium atoms with pairs of cobalt atoms, often termed cobalt "dumbbells". Sm_{2}Co_{17} commonly adopts the rhombohedral Th_{2}Zn_{17} structure at lower temperatures, while hexagonal Th_{2}Ni_{17}-type and disordered TbCu_{7}-related structures can be stabilized depending on temperature, composition and processing conditions.

Commercial 2:17-type samarium–cobalt magnets are not usually simple binary Sm_{2}Co_{17}, but contain substantial amounts of iron, copper and zirconium. Heat treatment produces a cellular microstructure consisting principally of rhombohedral 2:17-type cells separated by SmCo_{5}-type boundary regions, together with zirconium-rich lamellae. This microstructure is responsible for the high coercivity of the material.

=== Other intermetallic compounds ===
Samarium also forms binary intermetallic compounds with other transition metals. SmFe_{2} is a Laves phase that exhibits large negative magnetostriction. Although it was historically assigned a cubic structure, high-resolution diffraction studies found a trigonal structure with space group R3̅m at room temperature, transforming to an orthorhombic phase on cooling.

The samarium–nickel system contains several compounds, including SmNi, SmNi_{2}, SmNi_{3}, Sm_{2}Ni_{7}, Sm_{5}Ni_{19}, SmNi_{5} and Sm_{2}Ni_{17}. SmNi_{5} crystallizes in the same hexagonal CaCu_{5} structure type as SmCo_{5}, with space group P6/mmm, but has quite different magnetic properties and a much lower Curie temperature of about 29 K.

== Applications ==
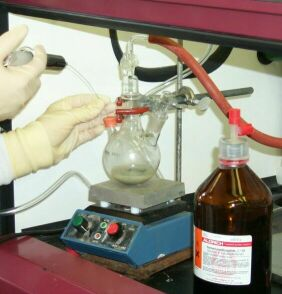
Barbier reaction using SmI_{2}

Samarium(II) iodide is widely used as a single-electron reducing agent in organic synthesis. Its reduction potential and selectivity can be modified substantially by the choice of solvent and additives, allowing reductions of carbonyl compounds, halides and other functional groups as well as carbon–carbon bond-forming reactions. SmI_{2}-mediated transformations include Barbier, Reformatsky, aldol, pinacol and radical cyclization reactions, and the reagent has been used extensively in the total synthesis of complex natural products. Although it is usually employed stoichiometrically, catalytic processes in which Sm^{2+} is regenerated during the reaction have also been developed.

Samarium–cobalt intermetallic compounds are used as high-performance permanent magnet materials. The principal families are based on SmCo_{5} and Sm_{2}Co_{17}, with commercial 2:17-type magnets generally containing additional iron, copper and zirconium. Their high Curie temperatures, thermal stability and comparatively good corrosion resistance make Sm–Co magnets particularly suitable for applications requiring magnetic performance at temperatures above those normally tolerated by Nd–Fe–B magnets. They are consequently used in aerospace systems, sensors, electrical machinery and microwave equipment.

Samarium(III) oxide has been investigated as a heterogeneous catalyst, particularly for the oxidative coupling of methane to ethane and ethylene. In an early comparison of thirty metal oxides, Sm_{2}O_{3} showed high activity and selectivity toward C_{2} hydrocarbons, and both undoped and alkali-promoted samarium oxides have subsequently been studied for this reaction.

Compounds of Sm^{3+} are also used to introduce samarium into optical materials. The characteristic 4f–4f transitions of Sm^{3+} give orange to red luminescence, and samarium-doped phosphate and other oxide glasses have been investigated as laser-active materials. Sm^{3+}-activated phosphors, which commonly emit near 600 nm, have likewise been investigated for orange-red components in solid-state lighting and other optical devices.

Samarium(II) sulfide has attracted interest as a pressure-sensitive and switchable material because its pressure-induced black-to-golden transition is accompanied by large changes in electrical and optical properties. SmS has been used in strain-gauge devices, while thin films have been investigated for pressure sensing, non-volatile memory, infrared detection and thermoelectric or thermovoltaic devices. Many of these proposed applications remain limited by difficulties in preparing stable, stoichiometric SmS films with the required samarium oxidation state.

Samarium hexaboride is primarily of interest as a condensed-matter research material. Its low-temperature insulating bulk and conducting surface states have made it an extensively studied example of a Kondo insulator and a candidate topological Kondo insulator.

== Gallery ==
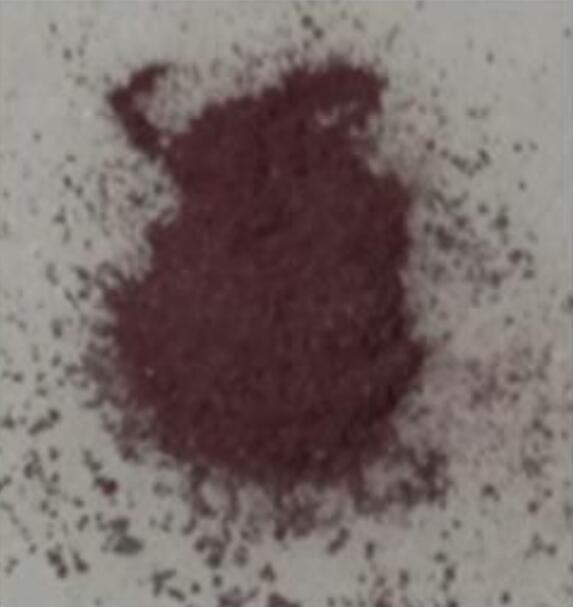
Samarium(II) chloride (SmCl_{2})

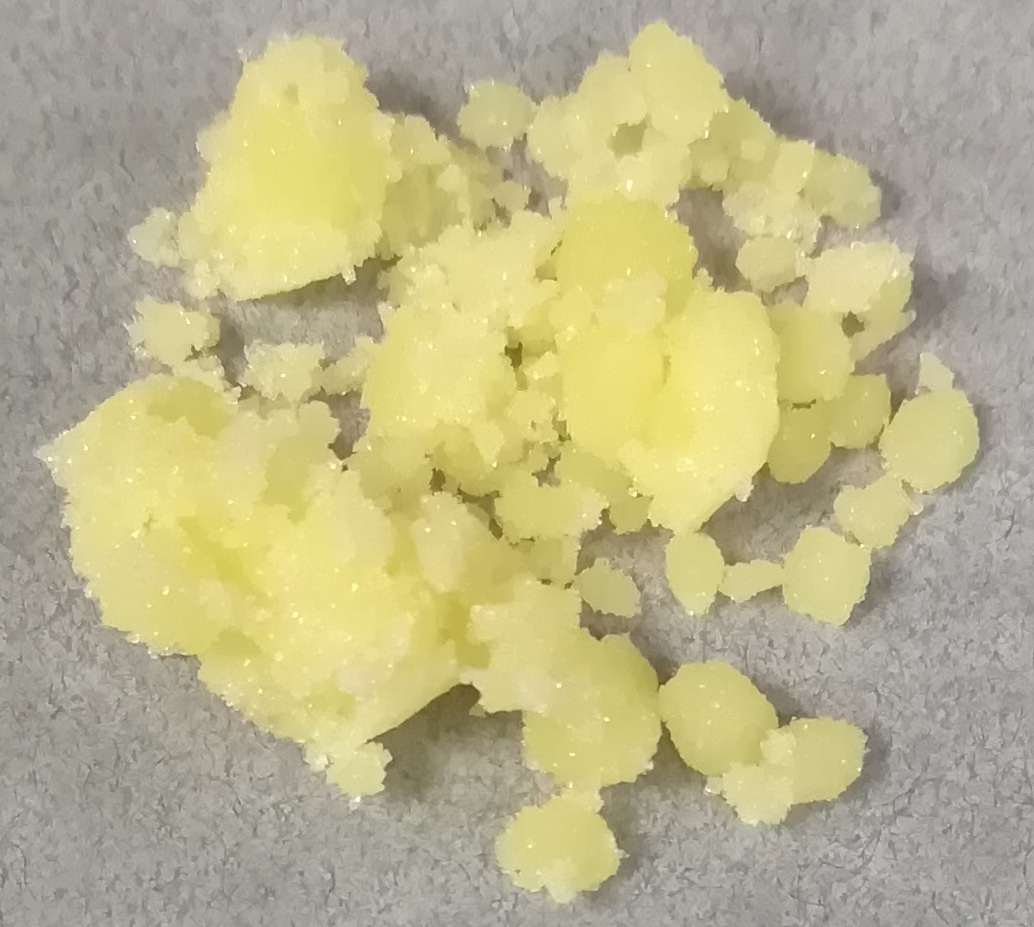
Samarium(III) chloride hexahydrate (SmCl_{3}·6H_{2}O)

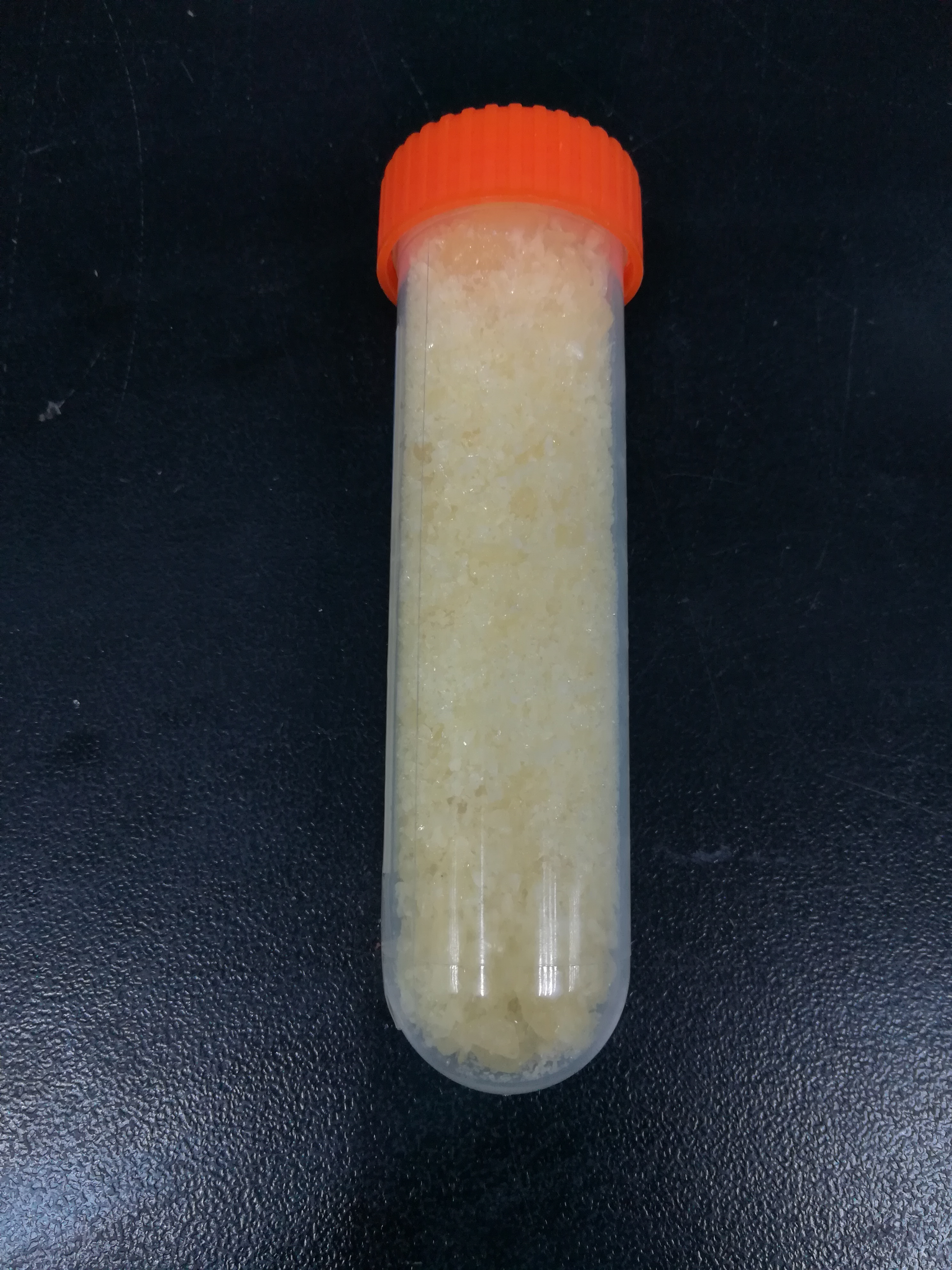
Samarium(III) nitrate (Sm(NO_{3})_{3})

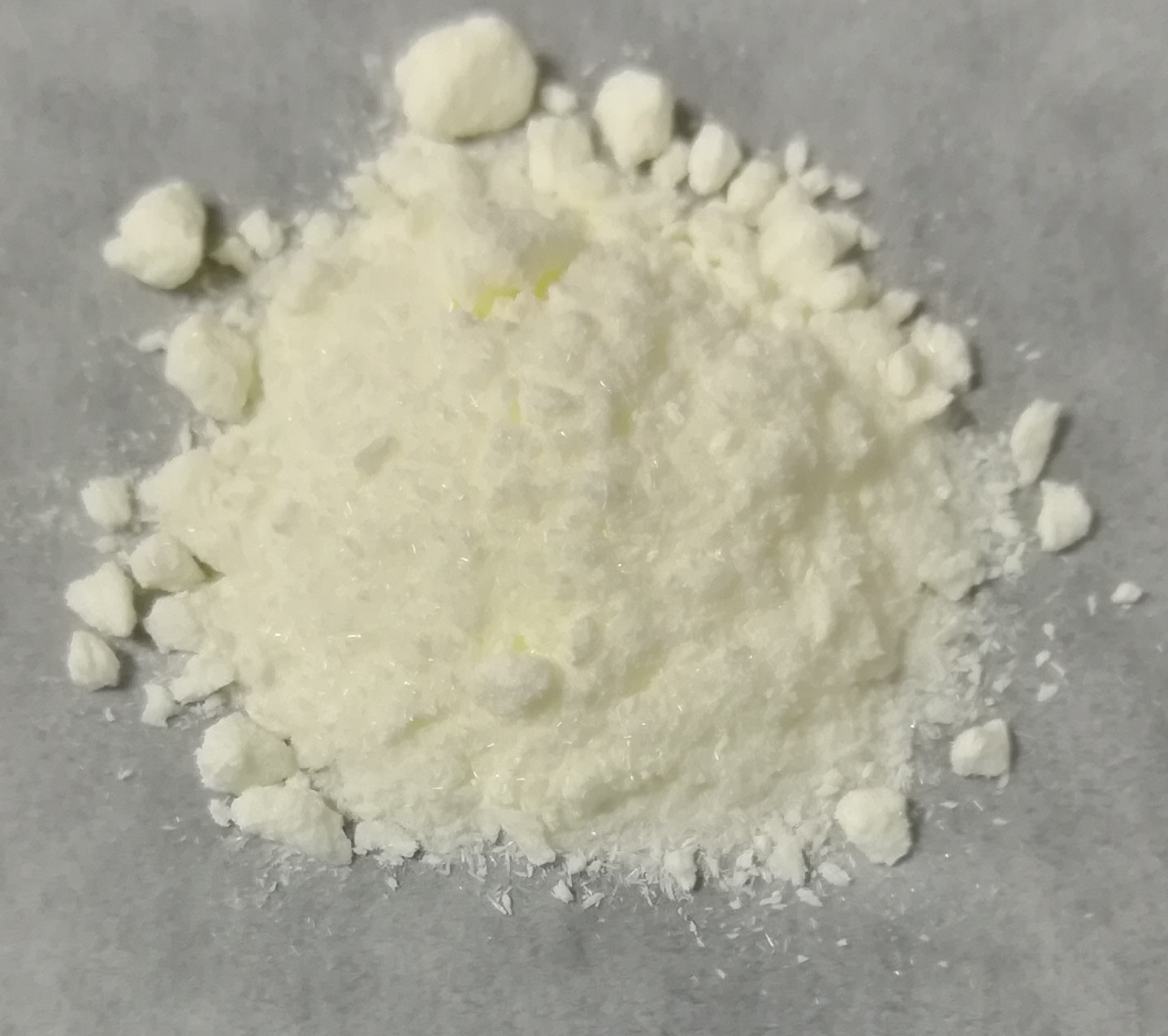
Samarium(III) acetate (Sm(CH_{3}COO)_{3})

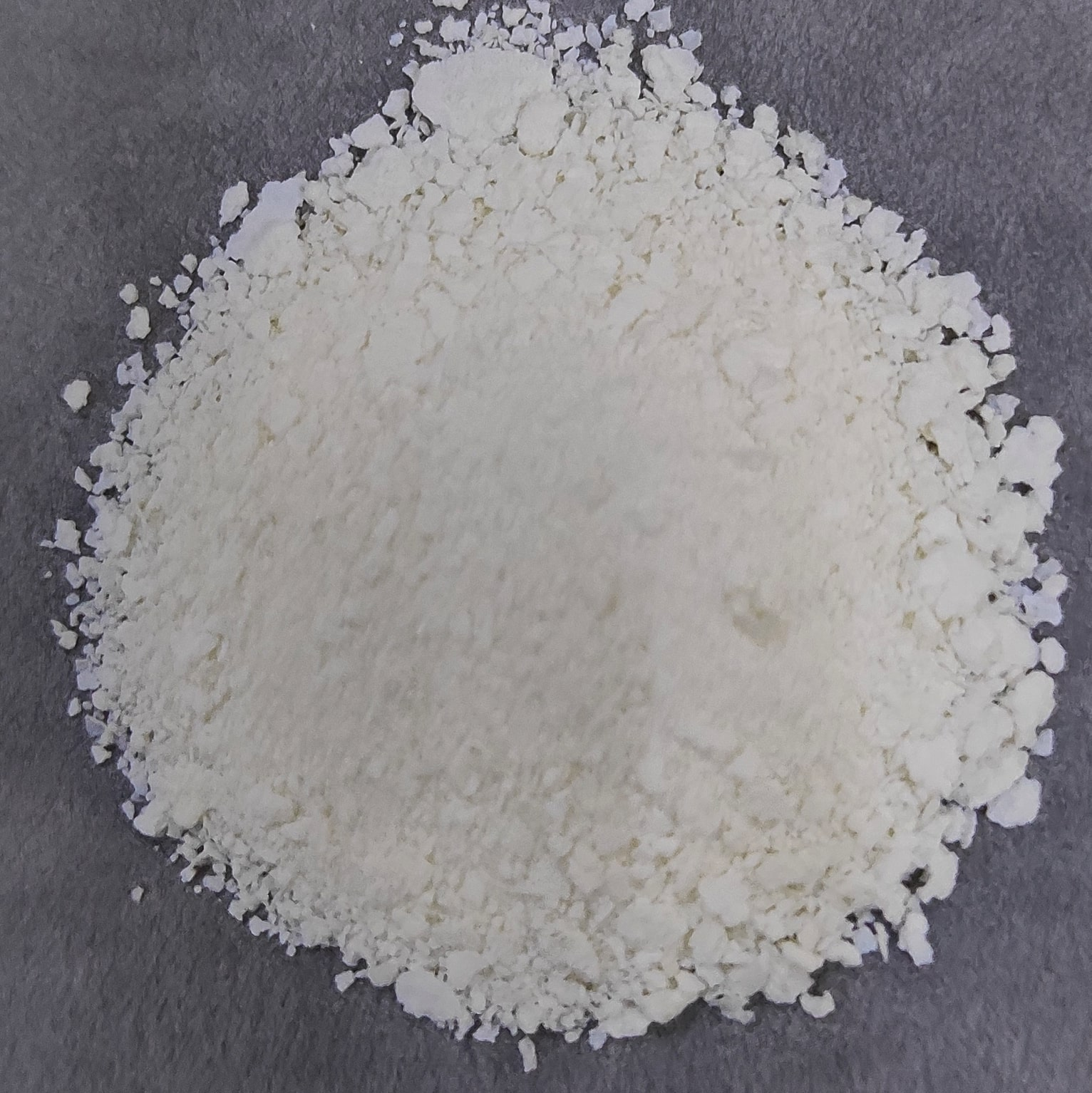
Samarium(III) hydroxide (Sm(OH)_{3})

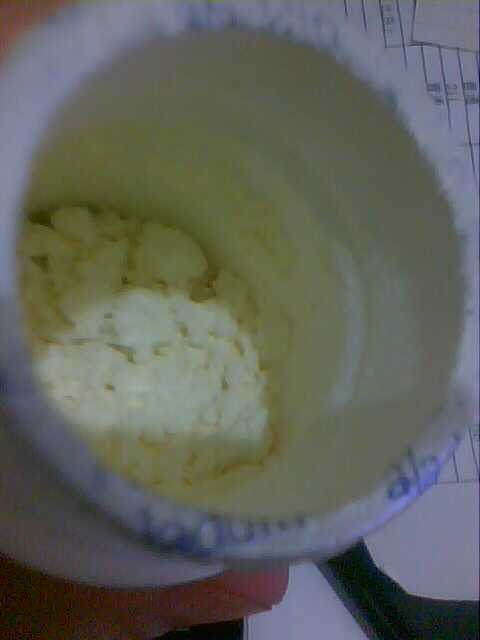
Samarium(III) oxide (Sm_{2}O_{3})

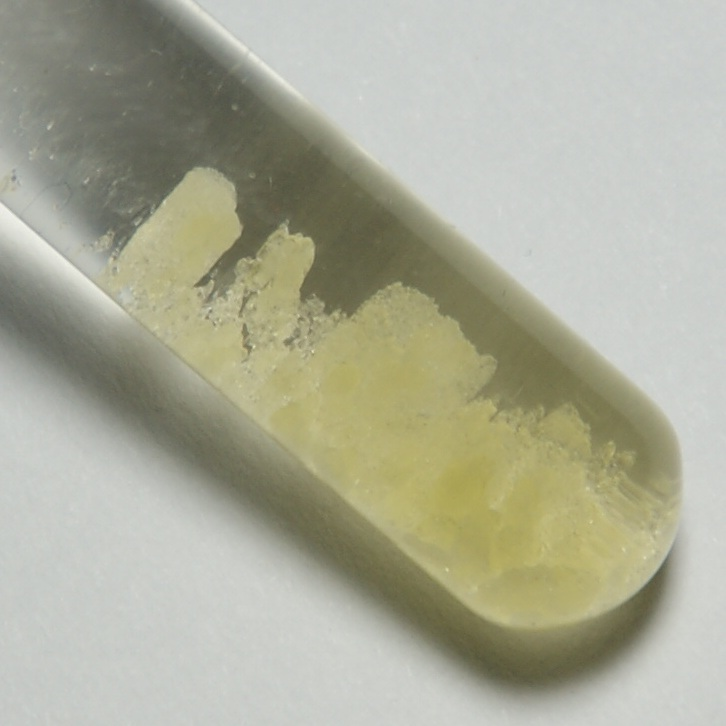
Samarium(III) sulfate (Sm_{2}(SO_{4})_{3})

== See also ==
- Category:Samarium compounds
- Category:Chemical compounds by element
- Praseodymium compounds
- Neodymium compounds
- Europium compounds
