= Europium(III) iodate =

Identifiers
CAS Number	14732-18-4
3D model (JSmol)	Interactive image
ECHA InfoCard	100.035.250
EC Number	238-791-1
PubChem CID	44146080
CompTox Dashboard (EPA)	DTXSID10163670
- InChI: InChI=1S/Eu.3HIO3/c;3*2-1(3)4/h;3*(H,2,3,4)/q+3;;;/p-3 Key: HQQLAVIUDCPDOA-UHFFFAOYSA-K
- SMILES: [O-]I(=O)=O.[O-]I(=O)=O.[O-]I(=O)=O.[Eu+3]

Properties
Chemical formula	Eu(IO_{3})_{3}
Molar mass	676.67 g/mol
- Except where otherwise noted, data are given for materials in their standard state (at 25 °C [77 °F], 100 kPa). Infobox references

Europium(III) iodate is an inorganic compound with the chemical formula Eu(IO_{3})_{3}. It can be produced by hydrothermal reaction of europium(III) nitrate or europium(III) oxide and iodic acid in water at 230 °C. It can be thermally decomposed as follows:

7 Eu(IO_{3})_{3} → Eu_{5}(IO_{6})_{3} + Eu_{2}O_{3} + 9 I_{2} + 21 O_{2}

It reacts hydrothermally with iodine pentoxide and molybdenum trioxide at 200 °C to obtain Eu(MoO_{2})(IO_{3})_{4}(OH).
