= Europium hydroxide =

Europium hydroxide may refer to:

- Europium(II) hydroxide (Europium dihydroxide), Eu(OH)_{2}
- Europium(III) hydroxide (Europium trihydroxide), Eu(OH)_{3}
