= Samarium(III) iodate =

Identifiers
CAS Number	14732-17-3 anhydrous; 56491-70-4 monohydrate; 56491-69-1 dihydrate
3D model (JSmol)	Interactive image
ECHA InfoCard	100.035.249
EC Number	238-790-6
PubChem CID	44145917
CompTox Dashboard (EPA)	DTXSID00163669
- InChI: InChI=1S/3HIO3.Sm/c3*2-1(3)4;/h3*(H,2,3,4);/q;;;+3/p-3 Key: TVUBRBGHFDEZNV-UHFFFAOYSA-K
- SMILES: [O-]I(=O)=O.[O-]I(=O)=O.[O-]I(=O)=O.[Sm+3]

Properties
Chemical formula	Sm(IO_{3})_{3}
Molar mass	675.07
Appearance	yellow crystals (dihydrate)
- Except where otherwise noted, data are given for materials in their standard state (at 25 °C [77 °F], 100 kPa). Infobox references

Samarium iodate is an inorganic compound with the chemical formula Sm(IO_{3})_{3}.

== Preparation ==
Samarium(III) iodate monohydrate can be obtained by reacting samarium(III) nitrate and potassium iodate in boiling water, and its dihydrate can be obtained by reacting samarium(III) chloride, iodine pentoxide and potassium periodate in water at 180 °C.

== Properties ==
Samarium(III) iodate decomposes as follows:

7 Sm(IO_{3})_{3} → Sm_{5}(IO_{6})_{3} + Sm_{2}O_{3} + 9 I_{2} + 21 O_{2}

It undergoes a hydrothermal reaction with iodine pentoxide and molybdenum trioxide at 200 °C to obtain Sm(MoO_{2})(IO_{3})_{4}(OH).
