= Europium(III) nitrate =

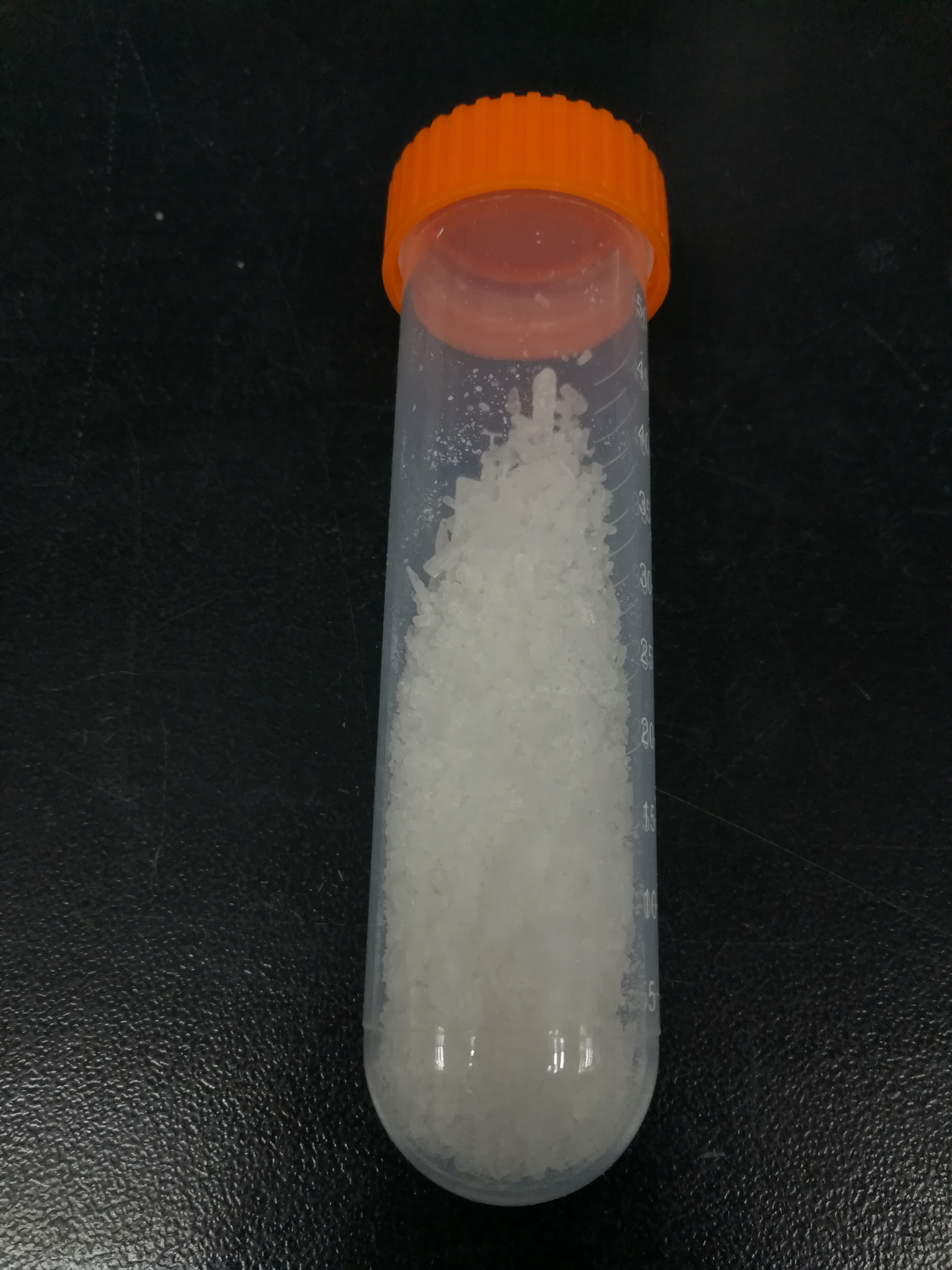

Names
- IUPAC name Europium trinitrate

Identifiers
CAS Number	10138-01-9 (anhydrous); 10031-53-5 (hexahydrate)
3D model (JSmol)	Interactive image
ChemSpider	23353 (anhydrous); 175150 (hexahydrate)
ECHA InfoCard	100.030.333
PubChem CID	54604362 (anhydrous); 202256 (hexahydrate)
CompTox Dashboard (EPA)	DTXSID80890643
- InChI: InChI=1S/Eu.3NO3.6H2O/c;3*2-1(3)4;;;;;;/h;;;;6*1H2/q+3;3*-1;;;;;; Key: JVYYYCWKSSSCEI-UHFFFAOYSA-N
- SMILES: [N+](=O)([O-])[O-].[N+](=O)([O-])[O-].[N+](=O)([O-])[O-].O.O.O.O.O.O.[Eu+3]

Properties
Chemical formula	Eu(NO_{3})_{3}
Molar mass	337.985 g/mol 446.081 g/mol (hexahydrate)
Melting point	65 °C (149 °F; 338 K) (hexahydrate) decomposes
Solubility in water	Soluble

Hazards
- GHS labelling
Pictograms	(GHS03: Oxidizing) (GHS07: Exclamation mark)
Signal word	Warning
Hazard statements	H272, H315, H319, H335
Precautionary statements	P210, P220, P221, P261, P264, P271, P280, P302+P352, P304+P340, P305+P351+P338, P312, P321, P332+P313, P337+P313, P362, P370+P378, P403+P233, P405, P501

Related compounds
Other anions	Europium(III) phosphate Europium(III) arsenate
Other cations	Samarium(III) nitrate Gadolinium(III) nitrate
Related compounds	Europium(II) nitrate Europium(III) oxide
- Except where otherwise noted, data are given for materials in their standard state (at 25 °C [77 °F], 100 kPa). Infobox references

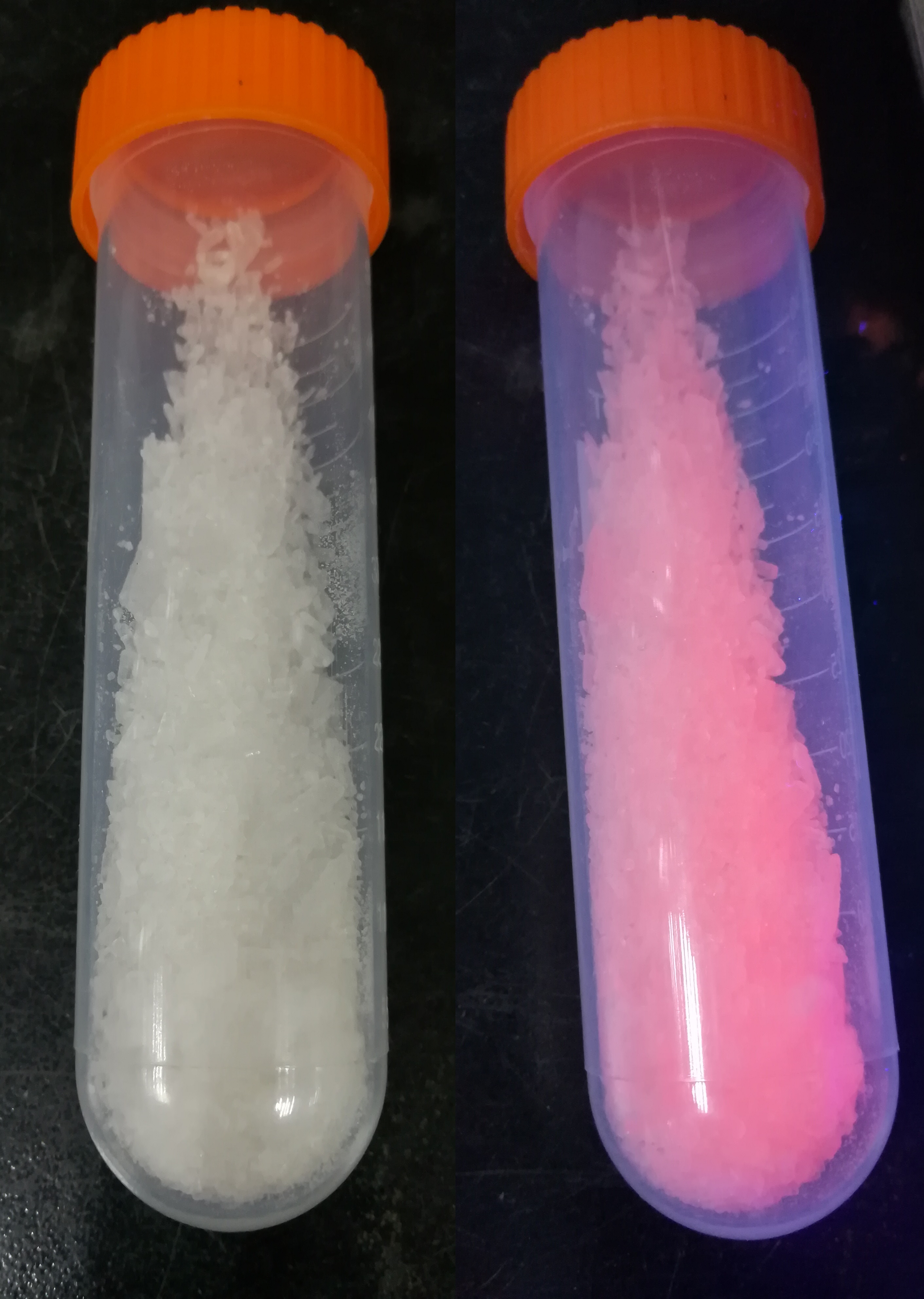
Europium(III) nitrate hexahydrate under fluorescent lamp (left) and UV light (right).

Europium(III) nitrate is an inorganic compound with the formula Eu(NO_{3})_{3}·x(H_{2}O). The hexahydrate is a common salt. It forms colorless hygroscopic crystals.

== Preparation ==
The salt is usually obtained by dissolving europium(III) oxide (Eu_{2}O_{3}) in nitric acid produces europium(III) nitrate.

Eu_{2}O_{3} + 6 HNO_{3} → 2 Eu(NO_{3})_{3} + 3 H_{2}O

== Structure ==
Like all trinitrates of the lanthanides, dilute (<0.01 M) solutions of consists of the aquo complex [Eu(H_{2}O)_{x}]^{3+} where x = 8 or 9. At higher concentrations, the binding of nitrate to Eu is observed.

== Complexes ==
Europium(III) nitrate reacts with anions and other Lewis bases to form complexes. For example, with 1,3,5-trimesic acid, europium metal-organic framework, a coordination polymer, under hydrothermal conditions.
