= Samarium(III) molybdate =

Identifiers
CAS Number	15702-43-9
3D model (JSmol)	Interactive image
PubChem CID	18934249
- InChI: InChI=1S/3Mo.12O.2Sm/q;;;;;;;;;6*-1;2*+3 Key: UQWWFYSMBNZRGM-UHFFFAOYSA-N
- SMILES: [Sm+3].[Sm+3].[O-][Mo](=O)(=O)[O-].[O-][Mo](=O)(=O)[O-].[O-][Mo](=O)(=O)[O-]

Properties
Chemical formula	Sm_{2}(MoO_{4})_{3}
Appearance	white solid
Solubility in water	insoluble
- Except where otherwise noted, data are given for materials in their standard state (at 25 °C [77 °F], 100 kPa). Infobox references

Samarium(III) molybdate is an inorganic compound, with the chemical formula Sm_{2}(MoO_{4})_{3}. It is one of the compounds formed by the three elements samarium, molybdenum and oxygen.

== Preparation ==
Samarium(III) molybdate can be obtained by reacting samarium(III) nitrate and sodium molybdate in the pH range of 5.5~6.0. Its single crystal can be grown at 1085 °C by the Czochralski method.

Samarium(III) molybdate can also be prepared by reacting samarium and molybdenum(VI) oxide:

$$\mathsf{ Sm_2O_3 + 3MoO_3 \ \xrightarrow{800^oC}\ Sm_2(MoO_4)_3 }$$

== Properties ==
Samarium(III) molybdate forms violet crystals of several modifications:

- orthorhombic crystal system, space group P ba2, unit cell parameters a = 1.04393 nm, b = 1.04794 nm, c = 1.07734 nm, Z = 4, exists at temperatures below 193 °C.
- monoclinic crystal system, exists at temperatures above 193 °C.

Samarium(III) molybdate exhibits ferroelectric properties. It forms a crystalline hydrate with the composition Sm_{2}(MoO_{4})_{3}•2H_{2}O.

Samarium(III) molybdate can be reduced to the tetravalent molybdenum compound Sm_{2}Mo_{3}O_{9} by hydrogen at 500~650 °C.
