= Europium hydride =

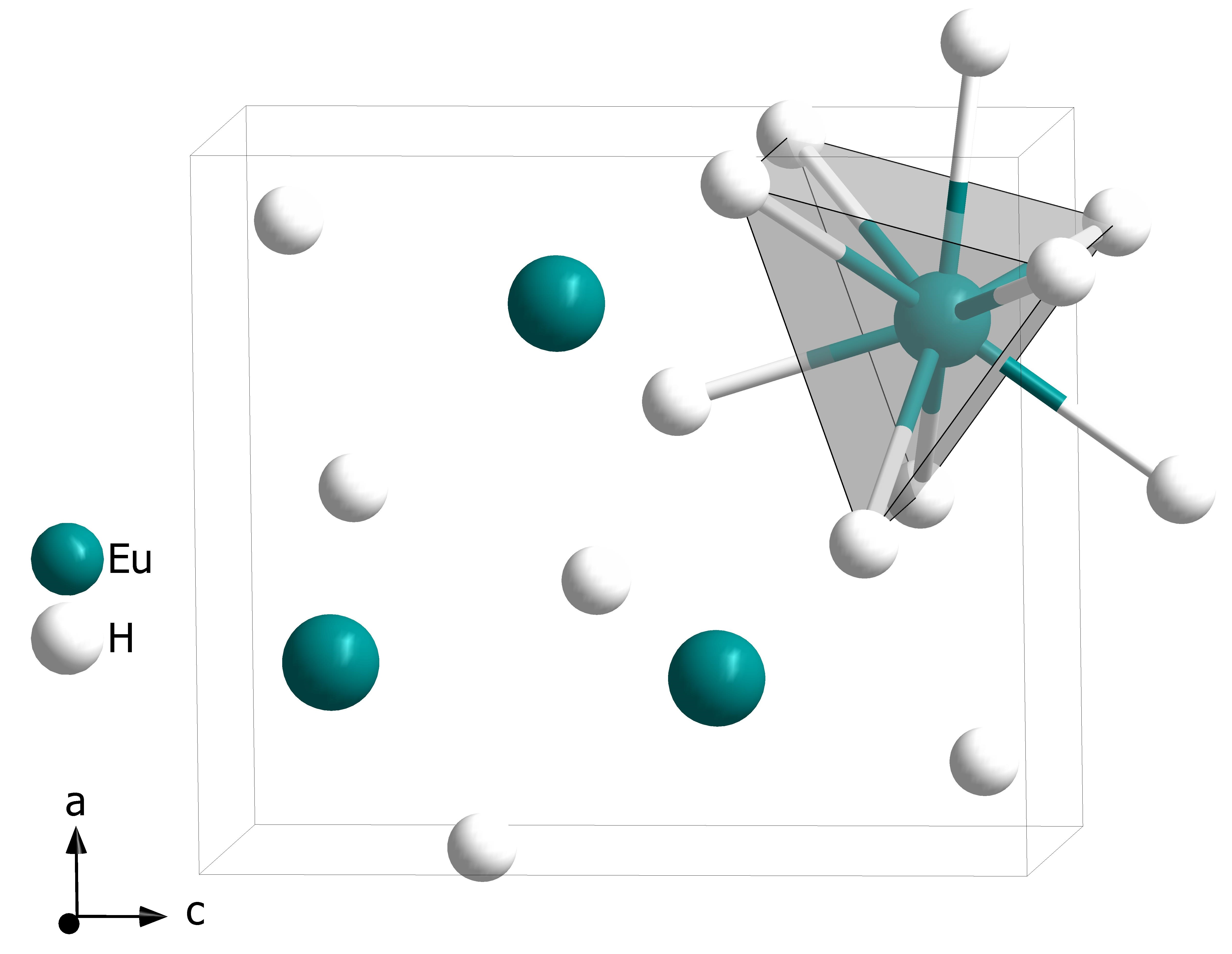

Names
- Other names Europium(II) hydride Europium dihydride

Identifiers
CAS Number	13814-78-3
3D model (JSmol)	Interactive image
PubChem CID	165360237
- InChI: InChI=1S/Eu.2H/q+2;2*-1 Key: YWDWTHOTGAGHBK-UHFFFAOYSA-N
- SMILES: [Eu+2].[H-].[H-]

Properties
Chemical formula	EuH_{2}
Molar mass	153.98
Appearance	dark reddish powder

Related compounds
Other anions	Europium(II) oxide Europium(II) hydroxide Europium(II) chloride
Other cations	samarium hydride gadolinium hydride
Related compounds	Europium(III) hydride
- Except where otherwise noted, data are given for materials in their standard state (at 25 °C [77 °F], 100 kPa). Infobox references

Europium hydride is the most common hydride of europium with a chemical formula EuH_{2}. In this compound, europium atom is in the +2 oxidation state and the hydrogen atoms are −1. It is a ferromagnetic semiconductor.

== Production ==
Europium hydride can be produced by directly reacting europium and hydrogen gas:

Eu + H_{2} → EuH_{2}

== Uses ==
EuH_{2} can be used as a source of Eu^{2+} to create metal-organic frameworks that have the Eu^{2+} ion.
