= Europium(II) telluride =

Names
- Other names: Europium ditelluride

Identifiers
CAS Number	12020-69-8
3D model (JSmol)	Interactive image
ChemSpider	74729
ECHA InfoCard	100.031.500
EC Number	234-663-4
PubChem CID	82811
CompTox Dashboard (EPA)	DTXSID801312600
- InChI: InChI=1S/Eu.Te Key: OSSGWZIRURPXNK-UHFFFAOYSA-N
- SMILES: [Te]=[Eu]

Properties
Chemical formula	EuTe
Molar mass	279.56 g/mol
Density	6.48 g/cm^{3}
Melting point	1526 °C

Hazards
- GHS labelling
Pictograms	(GHS06: Toxic)
Signal word	Danger
Hazard statements	H301, H332
Precautionary statements	P261, P301+P310, P304+P340, P312, P405, P501
- Except where otherwise noted, data are given for materials in their standard state (at 25 °C [77 °F], 100 kPa). Infobox references

Europium(II) telluride is an inorganic compound of europium and tellurium, with the chemical formula EuTe.

== Preparation ==
Europium(II) telluride can be prepared by the reaction of europium and tellurium at 500–1000 °C.

Eu + Te → EuTe

The compound can also be prepared by reacting europium(II) hydride and tellurium in a stream of hydrogen at 600–850 °C:

EuH_{2} + Te → EuTe + H_{2}

== Properties ==
Europium(II) telluride is a black antiferromagnetic solid with a cubic crystal structure of the NaCl-type.
