= Samarium(III) hydroxide =

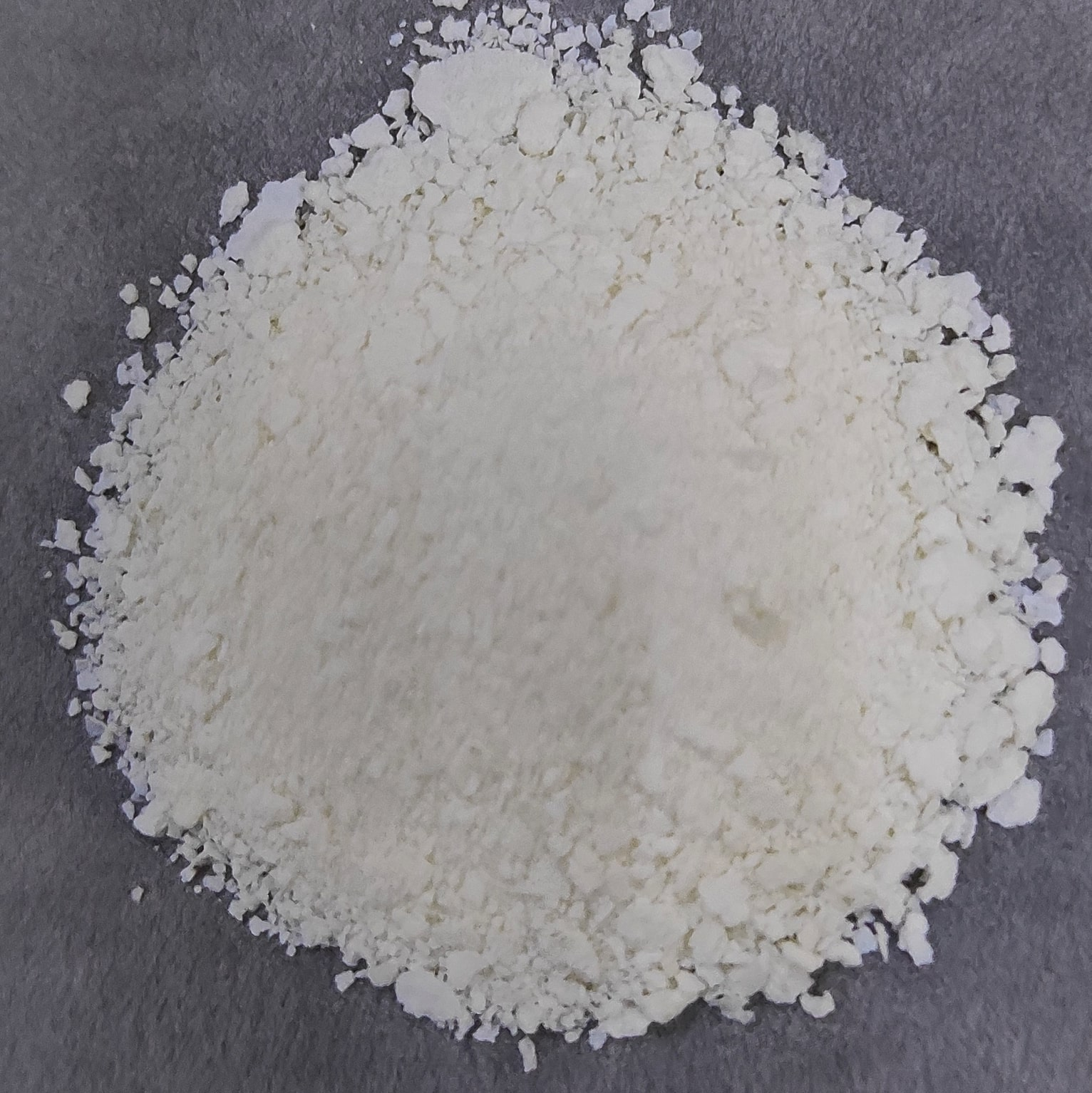

Identifiers
CAS Number	20403-06-9
3D model (JSmol)	Interactive image
ChemSpider	79875
ECHA InfoCard	100.039.791
EC Number	243-787-8
PubChem CID	88524
CompTox Dashboard (EPA)	DTXSID10942568
- InChI: InChI=1S/3H2O.Sm/h3*1H2;/q;;;+3/p-3 Key: BCYBEIXXOVNETJ-UHFFFAOYSA-K
- SMILES: [Sm+3].[OH-].[OH-].[OH-]

Properties
Chemical formula	Sm(OH)_{3}
Molar mass	201.386
Appearance	yellow solid

Hazards
- GHS labelling
Pictograms	(GHS05: Corrosive)
Signal word	Danger
Hazard statements	H314
Precautionary statements	P260, P264, P280, P301+P330+P331, P303+P361+P353, P304+P340, P305+P351+P338, P310, P321, P363, P405, P501

Related compounds
Other anions	samarium oxide
Other cations	neodymium(III) hydroxide europium(III) hydroxide
- Except where otherwise noted, data are given for materials in their standard state (at 25 °C [77 °F], 100 kPa). Infobox references

Samarium(III) hydroxide is an inorganic compound with chemical formula Sm(OH)_{3}.

== Chemical properties ==
Samarium(III) hydroxide can react with acid and produce samarium salts：

Sm(OH)_{3} + 3 H^{+} → Sm^{3+} + 3 H_{2}O

Samarium(III) hydroxide will decompose to SmO(OH) when heated; continued heating produces Sm_{2}O_{3}.
