= Europium(II) sulfide =

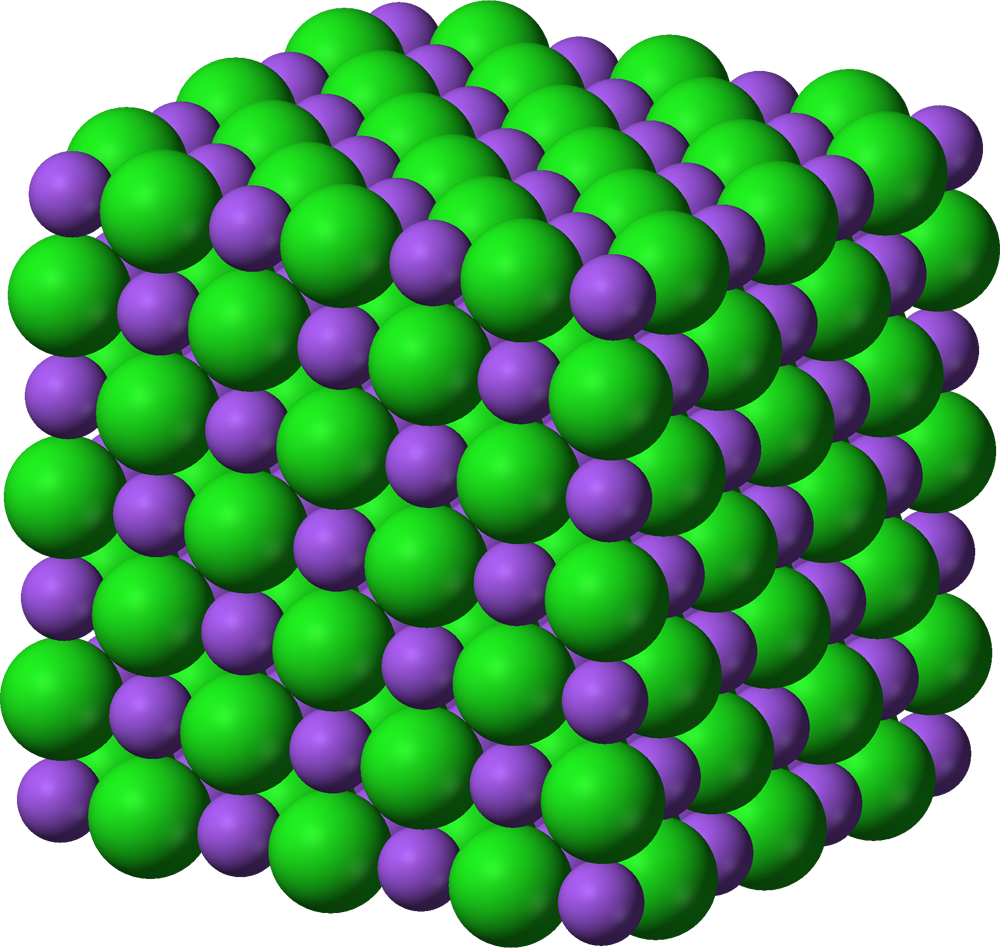

Names
- IUPAC name europium(II) sulfide

Identifiers
| CAS Number | 12020-65-4 |
| 3D model (JSmol) | Interactive image |
| ChemSpider | 29321960 |
| ECHA InfoCard | 100.031.498 |
| EC Number | 234-661-3 |
| PubChem CID | 82809 |
| CompTox Dashboard (EPA) | DTXSID401014195 |
- InChI: InChI=1S/Eu.S Key: RVKZDIDATLDTNR-UHFFFAOYSA-N
- SMILES: [Eu+2].[S-2]

Properties
| Chemical formula | EuS |
| Molar mass | 184.03 g/mol |
| Appearance | black powder |
| Melting point | 2,250 °C (4,080 °F; 2,520 K) |
| Magnetic susceptibility (χ) | +25,730;·10^{−6} cm^{3}/mol |

Hazards
- GHS labelling
| Pictograms | (GHS02: Flammable) |
| Signal word | Warning |
| Hazard statements | H228 |
| Precautionary statements | P210, P240, P241, P280, P370+P378 |
- Except where otherwise noted, data are given for materials in their standard state (at 25 °C [77 °F], 100 kPa). verify (what is ?) Infobox references

Europium(II) sulfide is the inorganic compound with the chemical formula EuS. It is a black, air-stable powder. Europium possesses an oxidation state of +II in europium sulfide, whereas the lanthanides exhibit a typical oxidation state of +III. Its Curie temperature (T_{c}) is 16.6 K. Below this temperature EuS behaves like a ferromagnetic compound, and above it exhibits simple paramagnetic properties. EuS is stable up to 500 °C in air, when it begins to show signs of oxidation. In an inert environment it decomposes at 1470 °C.

== Structure ==
EuS crystallizes in face-centered cubic (FCC) crystal lattice with the rock salt structure. Both europium and sulfur have octahedral coordination geometry with a coordination number of six. The Eu-S bond lengths are 2.41 Å.

== Preparation ==
In the preparation of EuS, powdered europium(III) oxide (Eu_{2}O_{3}) is treated with hydrogen sulfide (H_{2}S) at 1150 °C. The crude EuS product is purified by heating at 900 °C under vacuum to remove excess sulfur.

Eu_{2}O_{3} + 3 H_{2}S → 2 EuS + 3 H_{2}O + S

EuS has additionally been synthesized from europium dichloride (EuCl_{2}), however, such products tend to be contaminated by chloride.

== Research ==
In the past few decades, a new interest has been exhibited in the synthesis of EuS, as well as its oxygen analog EuO, because of their potential as laser window materials, insulating ferromagnets, ferromagnetic semiconductors, and magnetoresistant, optomagnetic, and luminescent materials. EuS was used in an experiment providing evidence of Majorana fermions relevant to quantum computing and the production of qubits.
