= Europium(III) arsenate =

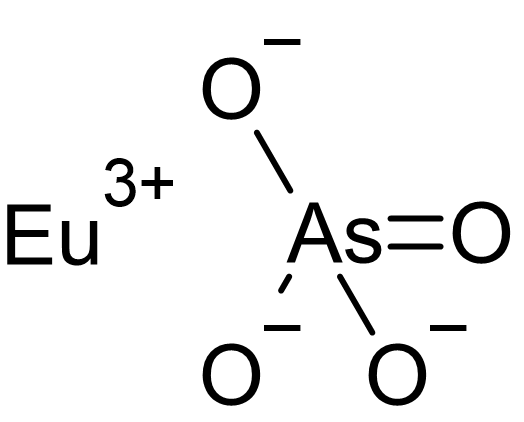

Names
- Other names Europium arsenate

Identifiers
CAS Number	22816-52-0
3D model (JSmol)	Interactive image
- InChI: InChI=1S/AsH3O4.Eu/c2-1(3,4)5;/h(H3,2,3,4,5);/q;+3/p-3 Key: LTLQVFNGOCEORU-UHFFFAOYSA-K
- SMILES: [O-][As](=O)([O-])[O-].[Eu+3]

Properties
Chemical formula	EuAsO_{4}
Appearance	solid
Solubility in water	insoluble
- Except where otherwise noted, data are given for materials in their standard state (at 25 °C [77 °F], 100 kPa). Infobox references

Europium(III) arsenate is an arsenate salt of europium, with the chemical formula of EuAsO_{4}. It has good thermal stability, with its pK_{sp,c} of 22.53±0.03. It is a colorless crystal with a xenotime structure.

== Preparation ==
Europium(III) arsenate can be prepared by reacting sodium arsenate (Na_{3}AsO_{4}) in a europium(III) chloride (EuCl_{3}) solution:

Na_{3}AsO_{4} + EuCl_{3} → 3 NaCl + EuAsO_{4}↓

Reacting europium(III) oxide (Eu_{2}O_{3}) with arsenic pentoxide (As_{2}O_{5}) can also obtain europium(III) arsenate.

Eu_{2}O_{3} + As_{2}O_{5} → 2EuAsO_{4}
