= Europium monoselenide =

Names
- Other names: Europium selenide; Europium(II) selenide; Selanylideneeuropium

Identifiers
CAS Number	12020-66-5
3D model (JSmol)	Interactive image
ChemSpider	74728
ECHA InfoCard	100.031.499
EC Number	234-662-9
PubChem CID	82810
CompTox Dashboard (EPA)	DTXSID101014196
- InChI: InChI=1S/Eu.Se Key: GCSIELJPGDPWNK-UHFFFAOYSA-N
- SMILES: [Eu]=[Se]

Properties
Chemical formula	EuSe
Molar mass	230.92
Appearance	black crystals
Density	6.45 g/cm^{3}
Melting point	1,213 °C (2,215 °F; 1,486 K)

Structure
Crystal structure	cubic, Fm3m

Hazards
- GHS labelling
Pictograms	(GHS06: Toxic) (GHS08: Health hazard) (GHS09: Environmental hazard)
Signal word	Danger
Hazard statements	H301, H331, H373
Precautionary statements	P260, P301+P310, P304+P340, P405, P501
- Except where otherwise noted, data are given for materials in their standard state (at 25 °C [77 °F], 100 kPa). Infobox references

Europium monoselenide is a binary inorganic compound of europium and selenium with the chemical formula EuSe. The compound forms black crystals.

== Synthesis ==
- Heating stoichiometric amounts of pure substances in a vacuum ampoule at 800 °C:

Eu + Se → EuSe

- Heating of europium(II) oxalate with an excess of selenium in a hydrogen current:

EuC_{2}O_{4} + Se + H_{2} → EuSe + H_{2}O + CO_{2} + CO

== Physical properties ==
Europium monoselenide forms black (or brown) crystals of cubic syngony, spatial group Fm3m, cell parameters a = 0.6185 nm, Z = 4.

Ferromagnetic at curie temperature 7 K.
