= Europium(II) oxide =

Names
- IUPAC name Europium(II) oxide
- Other names Europium monoxide

Identifiers
CAS Number	12020-60-9
3D model (JSmol)	Interactive image
ChemSpider	24725041
ECHA InfoCard	100.031.497
EC Number	234-660-8
PubChem CID	18439542
CompTox Dashboard (EPA)	DTXSID90893862
- InChI: InChI=1S/Eu.O Key: FYZGFASBNJXJGO-UHFFFAOYSA-N
- SMILES: [O-2].[Eu+2]

Properties
Chemical formula	EuO
Molar mass	167.963 g·mol^{−1}
Appearance	Violet crystals
- Except where otherwise noted, data are given for materials in their standard state (at 25 °C [77 °F], 100 kPa). Infobox references

Europium(II) oxide (EuO) is a chemical compound which is one of the oxides of europium. In addition to europium(II) oxide, there is also europium(III) oxide and the mixed valence europium(II,III) oxide.

== Preparation ==
Europium(II) oxide can be prepared by the reduction of europium(III) oxide with elemental europium at 800 °C and subsequent vacuum distillation at 1150 °C.

Eu_{2}O_{3} + Eu → 3 EuO

It is also possible to synthesize from the reaction of europium oxychloride and lithium hydride.

2 EuOCl + 2 LiH → 2 EuO + 2 LiCl + H_{2}

In modern research, thin films can be manufactured by molecular beam epitaxy directly from europium atoms and oxygen molecules. These films have contamination of Eu^{3+} of less than 1%.

== Properties ==
Europium(II) oxide is a violet compound as a bulk crystal and transparent blue in thin film form. It is unstable in humid atmosphere, slowly turning into the yellow europium(II) hydroxide hydrate and then to white europium(III) hydroxide. EuO crystallizes in a cubic sodium chloride structure with a lattice parameter a = 0.5144nm. The compound is often non-stoichiometric, containing up to 4% Eu^{3+} and small amounts of elemental europium. However, since 2008 high purity crystalline EuO films can be created in ultra high vacuum conditions. These films have a crystallite size of about 4 nm.

Europium(II) oxide is ferromagnetic with a Curie temperature of 69.3 K. With the addition of about 5-7% elemental europium, this increases to 79 K. It also displays colossal magnetoresistance, with a dramatic increase in conductivity below the Curie temperature. One more way to increase the Curie temperature is doping with gadolinium, holmium, or lanthanum.

Europium(II) oxide is a semiconductor with a band gap of 1.12 eV.

== Applications ==
Because of the properties of europium(II) oxide, thin layers of the oxide deposited on silicon are being studied for use as spin filters. Spin filter materials only allow electrons of a certain spin to pass, blocking electrons of the opposite spin.
