= Samarium(III) nitrate =

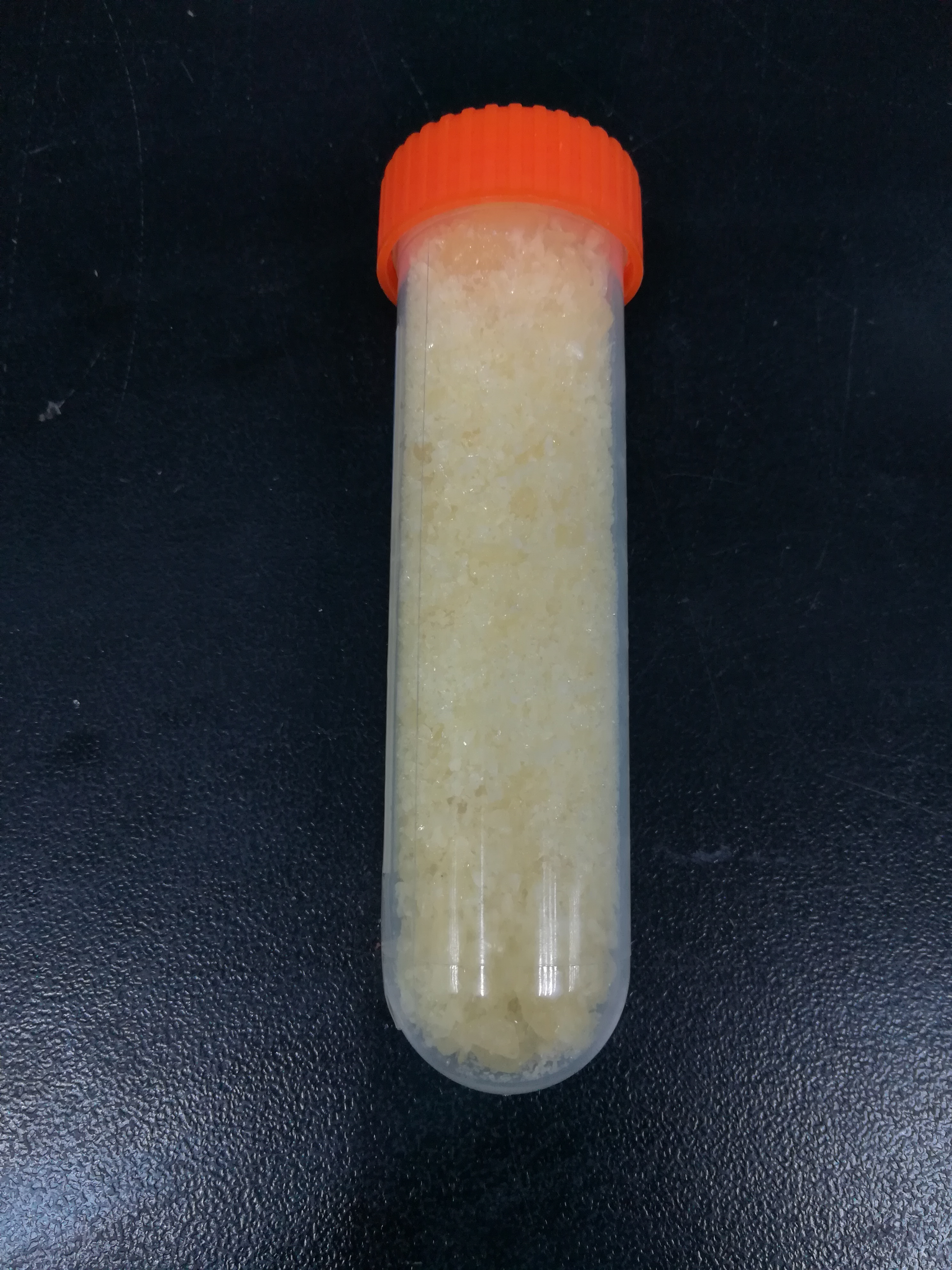

Names
- Other names: Samarium trinitrate

Identifiers
CAS Number	13759-83-6
3D model (JSmol)	Interactive image
ChemSpider	23541
ECHA InfoCard	100.030.713
EC Number	233-798-6
PubChem CID	25205
CompTox Dashboard (EPA)	DTXSID9047758
- InChI: InChI=1S/3NO3.6H2O.Sm/c3*2-1(3)4;;;;;;;/h;;;6*1H2;/q3*-1;;;;;;;+3
- SMILES: [Sm+3].[H]O[H].[H]O[H].[H]O[H].[H]O[H].[H]O[H].[H]O[H].[O-][N+]([O-])=O.[O-][N+]([O-])=O.[O-][N+]([O-])=O

Properties
Chemical formula	Sm(NO_{3})_{3}
Molar mass	336.37 g/mol (anhydrous); 444.462 g/mol (hexahydrate)
Appearance	Slightly brown crystals
Odor	Odorless
Melting point	78 °C (172 °F; 351 K)
Boiling point	420 °C (788 °F; 693 K) (decomposition)
Solubility in water	Soluble

Hazards
- GHS labelling
Pictograms	(GHS03: Oxidizing) (GHS05: Corrosive) (GHS07: Exclamation mark) (GHS09: Environmental hazard)
Signal word	Danger
Hazard statements	H272, H315, H318, H319, H335, H410
Precautionary statements	P210, P220, P221, P261, P264, P271, P273, P280, P302+P352, P304+P340, P305+P351+P338, P310, P312, P321, P332+P313, P337+P313, P362, P370+P378, P391, P403+P233, P405, P501
NFPA 704 (fire diamond)	1 0 2
- Except where otherwise noted, data are given for materials in their standard state (at 25 °C [77 °F], 100 kPa). Infobox references

Samarium(III) nitrate is an odorless, white-colored chemical compound with the formula Sm(NO_{3})_{3}. It forms the hexahydrate, which decomposes at 50°C to the anhydrous form. When further heated to 420°C, it is converted to the oxynitrate, and at 680°C it decomposes to form samarium(III) oxide.

== Synthesis ==
Samarium(III) nitrate is produced by the reaction of samarium hydroxide and nitric acid:

Sm(OH)_{3} + 3HNO_{3} → Sm(NO_{3})_{3} + 3H_{2}O

== Uses ==
Samarium(III) nitrate is a lewis acid catalyst that is used to produce a nitrate precursor solution that is used as a nanocatalyst in the solid oxide regenerative fuel cells. The nanocatalyst is made by mixing samarium(III) nitrate hexahydrate, strontium nitrate, and cobalt(II) nitrate hexahydrate.

Samarium(III) nitrate is also used for the preparation of samarium doped ceria, which can be used in the fabrication of electrolytes for fuel cells. The samarium doped ceria is produced by mixing cerium(III) nitrate and samarium(III) nitrate together using triethylene glycol as a solvent for 5 hours at 200°C. Then it was dried for 4 hours at 110°C which resulted in a brown solid. Then it was heated up to 500°C for two hours which made the samarium doped ceria.
