= Europium(II) hydroxide =

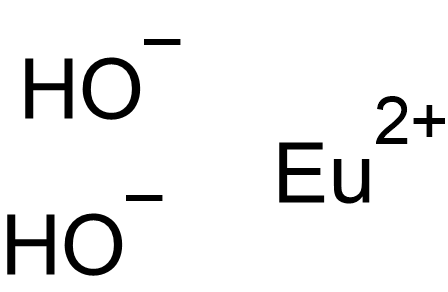

Names
- Other names Europium dihydroxide

Identifiers
CAS Number	12020-56-3
3D model (JSmol)	Interactive image
ChemSpider	24769659
PubChem CID	101288893
CompTox Dashboard (EPA)	DTXSID101337287
- InChI: InChI=1S/Eu.2H2O/h;2*1H2/q+2;;/p-2 Key: IVBWDMZYNZPPBZ-UHFFFAOYSA-L
- SMILES: [OH-].[OH-].[Eu+2]

Properties
Chemical formula	Eu(OH)_{2}
Appearance	pale yellow
- Except where otherwise noted, data are given for materials in their standard state (at 25 °C [77 °F], 100 kPa). Infobox references

Europium(II) hydroxide is an inorganic compound, with the chemical formula of Eu(OH)_{2}. It can exist as the dihydrate Eu(OH)_{2}·H_{2}O.

== Preparation ==
The monohydrate of europium(II) hydroxide can be obtained by the reaction of metal europium and 10 mol/L sodium hydroxide solution. There are some sources that use europium(III) chloride as a raw material, and prepare it by reacting the Jones reductor with sodium hydroxide solution.

== Properties ==
Europium(II) hydroxide belongs to the orthorhombic crystal system, a=6.701 ± 0.002, b=6.197 ± 0.002, c=3.652 ± 0.001 A. It thermally decomposes to form europium(II) oxide (EuO); it is readily oxidized to europium(III) hydroxide in air.
