= Samarium(III) oxide =

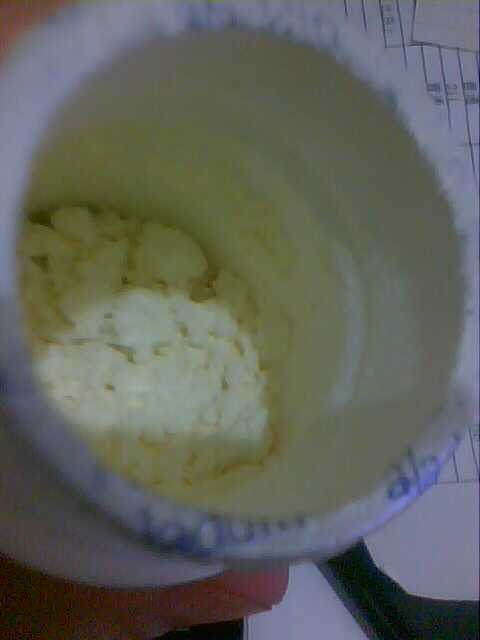
- Samarium(III) oxide

Names
- IUPAC name samarium(III) oxide
- Other names samarium sesquioxide, samaria

Identifiers
CAS Number	12060-58-1
3D model (JSmol)	Interactive image; Interactive image
ChemSpider	140199
ECHA InfoCard	100.031.845
EC Number	235-043-6
PubChem CID	159425
UNII	91N8739X2N
CompTox Dashboard (EPA)	DTXSID30925575 DTXSID4051611, DTXSID30925575
- InChI: InChI=1S/3O.2Sm/q3*-2;2*+3 Key: FKTOIHSPIPYAPE-UHFFFAOYSA-N
- SMILES: O=[Sm]O[Sm]=O; [Sm+3].[Sm+3].[O-2].[O-2].[O-2]

Properties
Chemical formula	Sm_{2}O_{3}
Molar mass	348.72 g/mol
Appearance	yellow-white crystals
Density	8.347 g/cm^{3}
Melting point	2,335 °C (4,235 °F; 2,608 K)
Boiling point	Not Stated
Solubility in water	insoluble
Magnetic susceptibility (χ)	+1988.0·10^{−6} cm^{3}/mol

Structure
Crystal structure	Cubic, cI80
Space group	Ia-3, No. 206

Hazards
- GHS labelling
Pictograms	(GHS07: Exclamation mark) (GHS09: Environmental hazard)
Signal word	Warning
Hazard statements	H319, H410
Precautionary statements	P264, P273, P280, P305+P351+P338, P337+P313, P391, P501

Related compounds
Other anions	Samarium(III) chloride
Other cations	Promethium(III) oxide, Europium(III) oxide
- Except where otherwise noted, data are given for materials in their standard state (at 25 °C [77 °F], 100 kPa). verify (what is ?) Infobox references

Samarium(III) oxide (Sm_{2}O_{3}) is a chemical compound. Samarium oxide readily forms on the surface of samarium metal under humid conditions or temperatures in excess of 150°C in dry air. Similar to rust on metallic iron, this oxide layer spalls off the surface of the metal, exposing more metal to continue the reaction. The oxide is commonly white to off yellow in color and is often encountered as a highly fine dust like powder.

== Uses ==
Samarium(III) oxide is used in optical and infrared absorbing glass to absorb infrared radiation. Also, it is used as a neutron absorber in control rods for nuclear power reactors. The oxide catalyzes the dehydration and dehydrogenation of primary and secondary alcohols. Another use involves preparation of other samarium salts.

== Preparations ==
Samarium(III) oxide may be prepared by two methods:

1. thermal decomposition of samarium(III) carbonate, hydroxide, nitrate, oxalate or sulfate:

Sm_{2}(CO_{3})_{3} → Sm_{2}O_{3} + 3 CO_{2}

2. by burning the metal in air or oxygen at a temperature above 150 °C:

4 Sm + 3 O_{2} → 2 Sm_{2}O_{3}

== Reactions ==
Samarium(III) oxide dissolves in mineral acids, forming salts upon evaporation and crystallization:

Sm_{2}O_{3} + 6 HCl → 2 SmCl_{3} + 3 H_{2}O

The oxide can be reduced to metallic samarium by heating with a reducing agent, such as hydrogen or carbon monoxide, at elevated temperatures.
