= Europium(III) oxide =

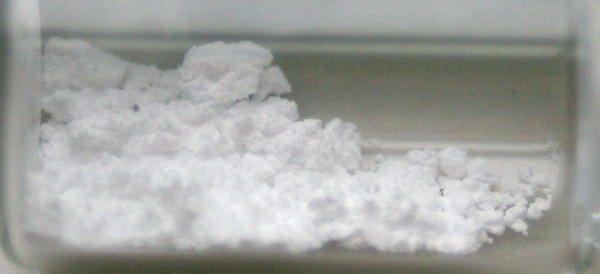

Identifiers
CAS Number	1308-96-9
3D model (JSmol)	Interactive image
ChemSpider	3441840
ECHA InfoCard	100.013.787
PubChem CID	159371
UNII	44642614WR
CompTox Dashboard (EPA)	DTXSID80152733
- InChI: InChI=1S/2Eu.3O Key: RSEIMSPAXMNYFJ-UHFFFAOYSA-N; InChI=1/2Eu.3O/rEu2O3/c3-1-5-2-4 Key: RSEIMSPAXMNYFJ-NRICTGFVAC
- SMILES: O=[Eu]O[Eu]=O

Properties
Chemical formula	Eu_{2}O_{3}
Molar mass	351.926 g/mol
Appearance	white to light-pink solid powder
Odor	odorless
Density	7.42 g/cm^{3}
Melting point	2,350 °C (4,260 °F; 2,620 K)
Boiling point	4,118 °C (7,444 °F; 4,391 K)
Solubility in water	Negligible
Magnetic susceptibility (χ)	+10,100·10^{−6} cm^{3}/mol
Thermal conductivity	2.45 W/(m K)

Structure
Crystal structure	cubic, cI80, Monoclinic
Space group	Ia-3, No. 206, C2/m, No. 12

Hazards
- Lethal dose or concentration (LD, LC)
LD_{50} (median dose)	5000 mg/kg (rat, oral)
Safety data sheet (SDS)	External MSDS

Related compounds
Other anions	Europium(III) chloride
Other cations	Samarium(III) oxide, Gadolinium(III) oxide
- Except where otherwise noted, data are given for materials in their standard state (at 25 °C [77 °F], 100 kPa). verify (what is ?) Infobox references

Europium(III) oxide (Eu_{2}O_{3}), is a chemical compound of europium and oxygen. It is widely used as a red or blue phosphor in television sets and fluorescent lamps, and as an activator for yttrium-based phosphors. It is also an agent for the manufacture of fluorescent glass. Europium fluorescence is used in the anti-counterfeiting phosphors in Euro banknotes.

Europium oxide has two common structures: Monoclinic (mS30, space group C2/m, No. 12) and cubic (cI80, space group Ia3̅, No. 206). The cubic structure is similar to that of manganese(III) oxide.

It may be formed by ignition of europium metal.

It can react with acids to form the corresponding europium(III) salts.

== Gallery ==
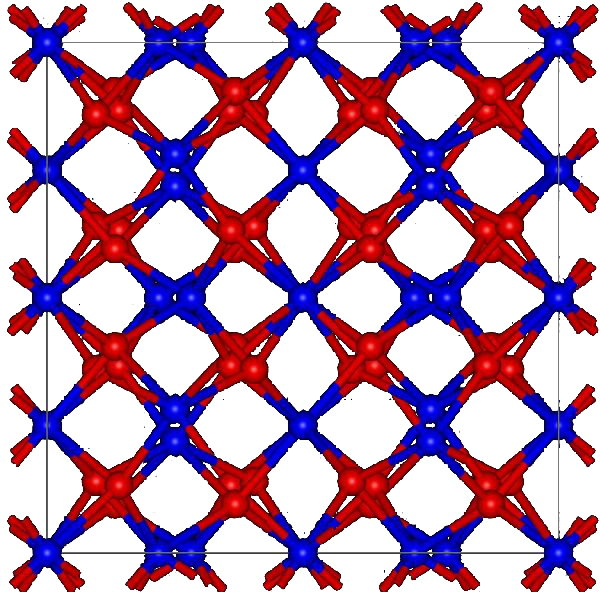
Cubic Eu_{2}O_{3}

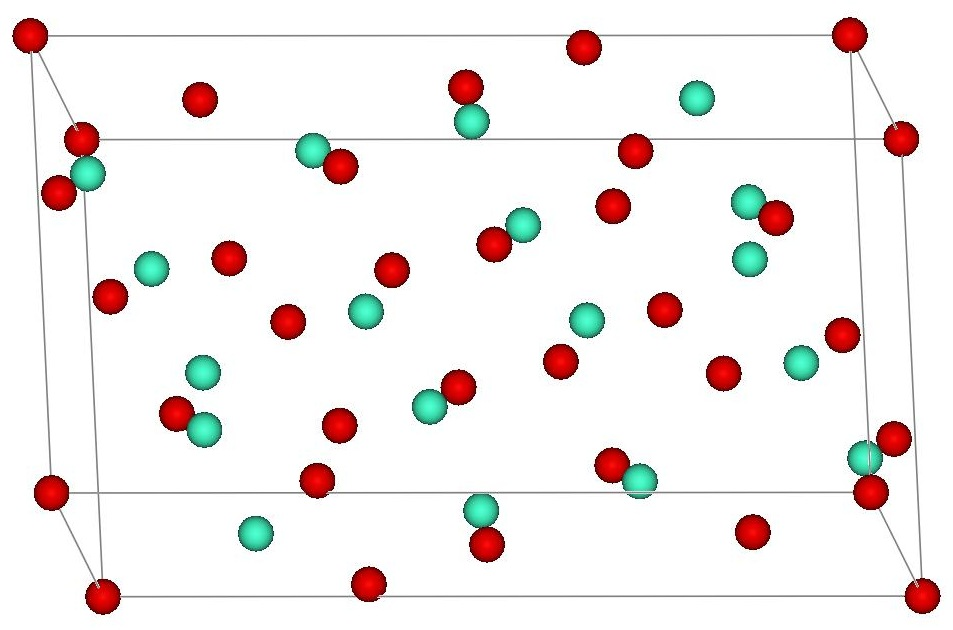
Monoclinic Eu_{2}O_{3}
