= Neodymium(III) chloride =

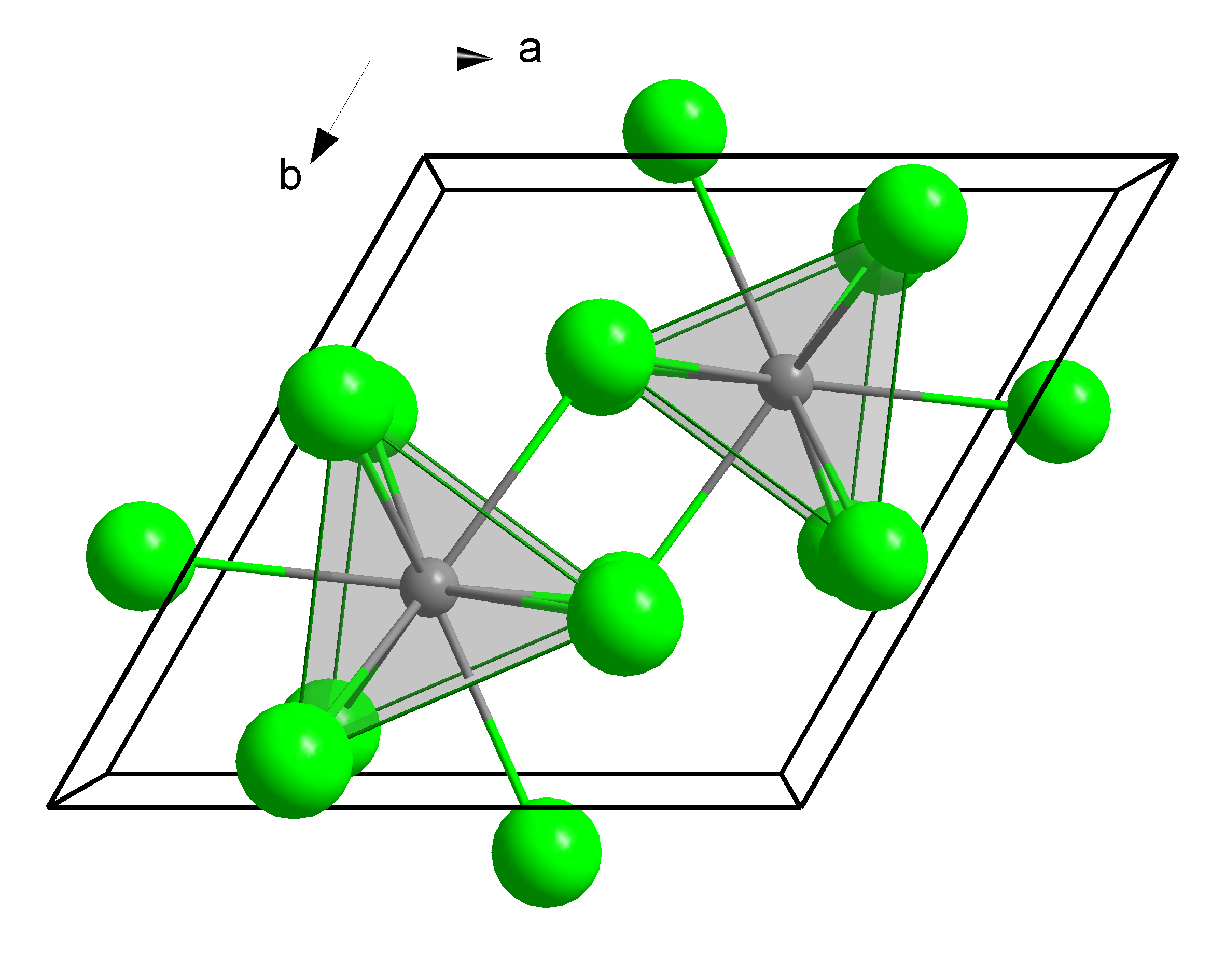

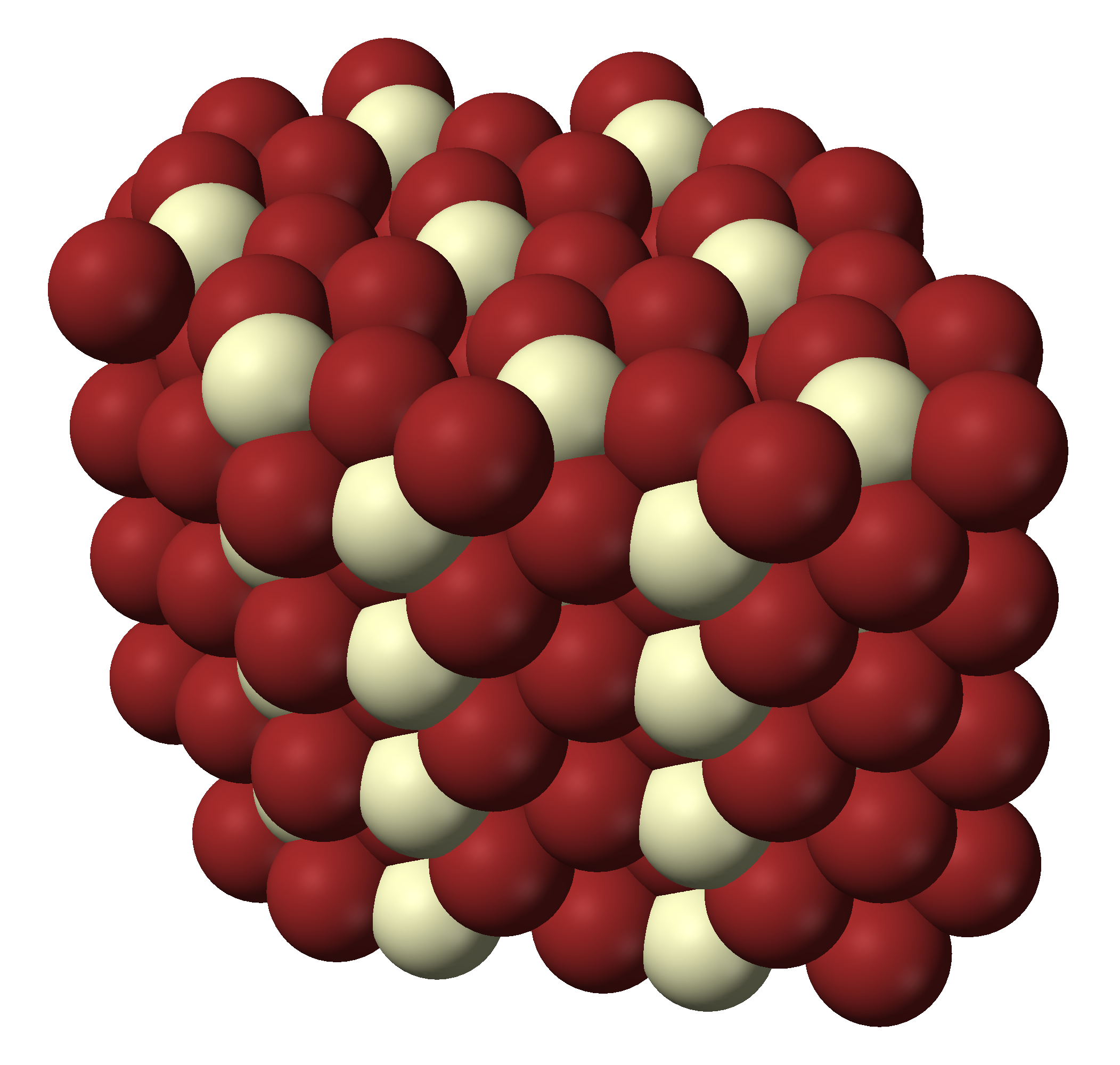

Names
- Other names Neodymium trichloride

Identifiers
CAS Number	10024-93-8; 13477-89-9 (hydrate)
3D model (JSmol)	Interactive image
ChemSpider	59589
ECHA InfoCard	100.030.016
PubChem CID	66204
UNII	25O44EQD4O
CompTox Dashboard (EPA)	DTXSID7044760
- InChI: InChI=1S/3ClH.Nd/h3*1H;/q;;;+3/p-3 Key: ATINCSYRHURBSP-UHFFFAOYSA-K; InChI=1/3ClH.Nd/h3*1H;/q;;;+3/p-3 Key: ATINCSYRHURBSP-DFZHHIFOAM
- SMILES: Cl[Nd](Cl)Cl

Properties
Chemical formula	NdCl_{3}, NdCl_{3}·6H_{2}O (hydrate)
Molar mass	250.598 g/mol (anhydrous); 358.69 g/mol (hexahydrate)
Appearance	Mauve-colored powder hygroscopic
Density	4.13 g/cm^{3} (2.3 for hydrate)
Melting point	759 °C (1,398 °F; 1,032 K)
Boiling point	1,600 °C (2,910 °F; 1,870 K)
Solubility in water	1 kg/L at 25 °C
Solubility in ethanol	0.445 kg/L

Structure
Crystal structure	hexagonal (UCl_{3} type), hP8
Space group	P6_{3}/m, No. 176
Lattice constant	a = 0.73988 nm, c = 0.42423 nm
Formula units (Z)	2
Coordination geometry	Tricapped trigonal prismatic (nine-coordinate)

Hazards
- GHS labelling
Pictograms	(GHS07: Exclamation mark)
Signal word	Warning
Hazard statements	H315, H319, H335
Precautionary statements	P261, P264, P271, P280, P302+P352, P304+P340, P305+P351+P338, P312, P321, P332+P313, P337+P313, P362, P403+P233, P405, P501
NFPA 704 (fire diamond)	2 0 0
Safety data sheet (SDS)	External SDS

Related compounds
Other anions	Neodymium(III) bromide Neodymium(III) oxide
Other cations	LaCl_{3}, SmCl_{3}, PrCl_{3}, EuCl_{3}, CeCl_{3}, GdCl_{3}, TbCl_{3}, Promethium(III) chloride
- Except where otherwise noted, data are given for materials in their standard state (at 25 °C [77 °F], 100 kPa). verify (what is ?) Infobox references

Neodymium(III) chloride or neodymium trichloride is a chemical compound of neodymium and chlorine with the formula NdCl_{3}. This anhydrous compound is a mauve-colored solid that rapidly absorbs water on exposure to air to form a purple-colored hexahydrate, NdCl_{3}·6H_{2}O. Neodymium(III) chloride is produced from minerals monazite and bastnäsite using a complex multistage extraction process. The chloride has several important applications as an intermediate chemical for production of neodymium metal and neodymium-based lasers and optical fibers. Other applications include a catalyst in organic synthesis and in decomposition of waste water contamination, corrosion protection of aluminium and its alloys, and fluorescent labeling of organic molecules (DNA).

== Appearance ==
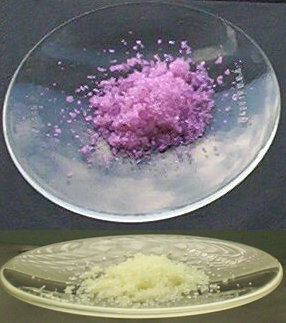
NdCl_{3} under sunlight (top) and fluorescent light (bottom)

NdCl_{3} is a mauve colored hygroscopic solid whose color changes to purple upon absorption of atmospheric water. The resulting hydrate, like many other neodymium salts, has the interesting property that it appears different colors under fluorescent light- In the chloride's case, light yellow (see picture).

== Structure ==
=== Solid ===
The anhydrous NdCl_{3} features Nd in a nine-coordinate tricapped trigonal prismatic geometry and crystallizes with the UCl_{3} structure. This hexagonal structure is common for many halogenated lanthanides and actinides such as LaCl_{3}, LaBr_{3}, SmCl_{3}, PrCl_{3}, EuCl_{3}, CeCl_{3}, CeBr_{3}, GdCl_{3}, AmCl_{3} and TbCl_{3} but not for YbCl_{3} and LuCl_{3}.

=== Solution ===
The structure of neodymium(III) chloride in solution crucially depends on the solvent: In water, the major species are Nd(H_{2}O)_{8}^{3+}, and this situation is common for most rare earth chlorides and bromides. In methanol, the species are NdCl_{2}(CH_{3}OH)_{6}^{+} and in hydrochloric acid NdCl(H_{2}O)_{7}^{2+}. The coordination of neodymium is octahedral (8-fold) in all cases, but the ligand structure is different.

== Properties ==
NdCl_{3} is a soft paramagnetic solid, which turns ferromagnetic at very low temperature of 0.5 K. Its electrical conductivity is about 240 S/m and heat capacity is ~100 J/(mol·K). NdCl_{3} is readily soluble in water and ethanol, but not in chloroform or ether. Reduction of NdCl_{3} with Nd metal at temperatures above 650 °C yields NdCl_{2}:

2 NdCl_{3} + Nd → 3 NdCl_{2}

Heating of NdCl_{3} with water vapors or silica produces neodymium oxochloride:

NdCl_{3} + H_{2}O → NdOCl + 2 HCl
2 NdCl_{3} + SiO_{2} → 2 NdOCl + SiCl_{4}

Reacting NdCl_{3} with hydrogen sulfide at about 1100 °C produces neodymium sulfide:

2 NdCl_{3} + 3 H_{2}S → 2 Nd_{2}S_{3} + 6 HCl

Reactions with ammonia and phosphine at high temperatures yield neodymium nitride and phosphide, respectively:

NdCl_{3} + NH_{3} → NdN + 3 HCl
NdCl_{3} + PH_{3} → NdP + 3 HCl

Whereas the addition of hydrofluoric acid produces neodymium fluoride:

NdCl_{3} + 3 HF → NdF_{3} + 3 HCl

== Preparation ==
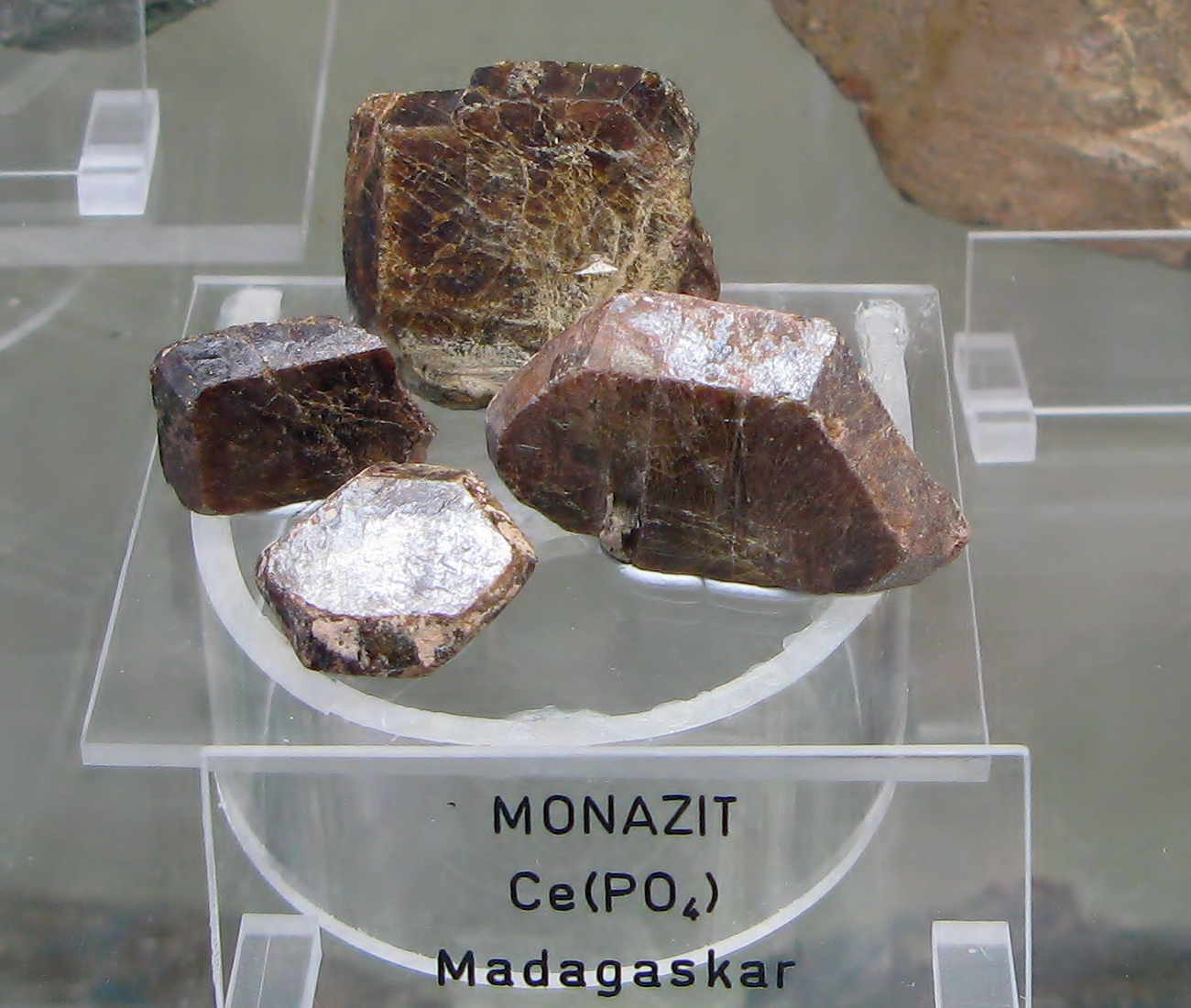
Monazite

NdCl_{3} is produced from minerals monazite and bastnäsite. The synthesis is complex because of the low abundance of neodymium in the Earth's crust (38 mg/kg) and because of difficulty of separating neodymium from other lanthanides. The process is however easier for neodymium than for other lanthanides because of its relatively high content in the mineral – up to 16% by weight, which is the third highest after cerium and lanthanum. Many synthesis varieties exist and one can be simplified as follows:

The crushed mineral is treated with hot concentrated sulfuric acid to produce water-soluble sulfates of rare earths. The acidic filtrates are partially neutralized with sodium hydroxide to pH 3–4. Thorium precipitates out of solution as hydroxide and is removed. After that the solution is treated with ammonium oxalate to convert rare earths into their insoluble oxalates. The oxalates are converted to oxides by annealing. The oxides are dissolved in nitric acid that excludes the main components, cerium, whose oxide is insoluble in HNO_{3}. Neodymium oxide is separated from other rare-earth oxides by ion exchange. In this process, rare-earth ions are adsorbed onto suitable resin by ion exchange with hydrogen, ammonium or cupric ions present in the resin. The rare earth ions are then selectively washed out by suitable complexing agent, such as ammonium citrate or nitrilotracetate.

This process normally yields Nd_{2}O_{3}; the oxide is difficult to directly convert to elemental neodymium, which is often the goal of the whole technological procedure. Therefore, the oxide is treated with hydrochloric acid and ammonium chloride to produce the less stable NdCl_{3}:

Nd_{2}O_{3} + 6 NH_{4}Cl → 2 NdCl_{3} + 3 H_{2}O + 6 NH_{3}

The thus produced NdCl_{3} quickly absorbs water and converts to NdCl_{3}·6H_{2}O hydrate, which is stable for storage, and can be converted back into NdCl_{3} when necessary. Simple rapid heating of the hydrate is not practical for that purpose because it causes hydrolysis with consequent production of Nd_{2}O_{3}. Therefore, anhydrous NdCl_{3} is prepared by dehydration of the hydrate either by slowly heating to 400 °C with 4-6 equivalents of ammonium chloride under high vacuum, or by heating with an excess of thionyl chloride for several hours. The NdCl_{3} can alternatively be prepared by reacting neodymium metal with hydrogen chloride or chlorine, though this method is not economical due to the relatively high price of the metal and is used for research purposes only. After preparation, it is usually purified by high temperature sublimation under high vacuum.

== Applications ==
=== Production of neodymium metal ===
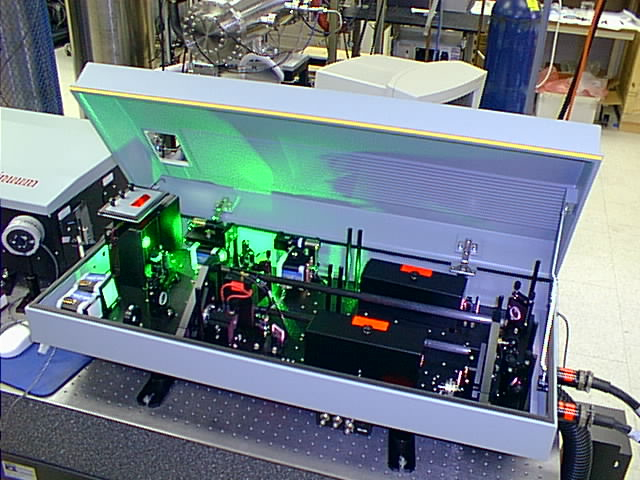
Nd:YAG laser with lid open showing frequency doubled 532 nm green light

Neodymium(III) chloride is the most common starting compound for production of neodymium metal. NdCl_{3} is heated with ammonium chloride or ammonium fluoride and hydrofluoric acid or with alkali or alkaline earth metals in vacuum or argon atmosphere at 300–400 °C.

2 NdCl_{3} + 3 Ca → 2 Nd + 3 CaCl_{2}

An alternative route is electrolysis of molten mixture of anhydrous NdCl_{3} and NaCl, KCl, or LiCl at temperatures about 700 °C. The mixture melts at those temperatures, even though they are lower than the melting points of NdCl_{3} and KCl (~770 °C).

=== Lasers and fiber amplifiers ===
Although NdCl_{3} itself does not have strong luminescence, it serves as a source of Nd^{3+} ions for various light emitting materials. The latter include Nd-YAG lasers and Nd-doped optical fiber amplifiers, which amplify light emitted by other lasers. The Nd-YAG laser emits infrared light at 1.064 micrometres and is the most popular solid-state laser (i.e. laser based on a solid medium). The reason for using NdCl_{3} rather than metallic neodymium or its oxide, in fabrication of fibers is easy decomposition of NdCl_{3} during the chemical vapor deposition; the latter process is widely used for the fiber grows.

Neodymium(III) chloride is a dopant not only of traditional silica-based optical fibers, but of plastic fibers (dopedphotolime-gelatin, polyimide, polyethylene, etc.) as well. It is also used in as an additive into infrared organic light-emitting diodes. Besides, neodymium doped organic films can not only act as LEDs, but also as color filters improving the LED emission spectrum.

Solubility of neodymium(III) chloride (and other rare-earth salts) is various solvents results in a new type of rare-earth laser, which uses not a solid but liquid as an active medium. The liquid containing Nd^{3+} ions is prepared in the following reactions:

SnCl_{4} + 2 SeOCl_{2} → SnCl_{6}^{2−} + 2 SeOCl^{+}
SbCl_{5} + SeOCl_{2} → SbCl_{6}^{−} + SeOCl^{+}
3 SeOCl^{+} + NdCl_{3} → Nd^{3+}(solv) + 3 SeOCl_{2},

where Nd^{3+} is in fact the solvated ion with several selenium oxychloride molecules coordinated in the first coordination sphere, that is [Nd(SeOCl_{2})_{m}]^{3+}. The laser liquids prepared by this technique emits at the same wavelength of 1.064 micrometres and possess properties, such as high gain and sharpness of the emission, that are more characteristic of crystalline than Nd-glass lasers. The quantum efficiency of those liquid lasers was about 0.75 relative to the traditional Nd:YAG laser.

=== Catalysis ===
Another important application of NdCl_{3} is in catalysis—in combination with organic chemicals, such as triethylaluminium and 2-propanol, it accelerates polymerization of various dienes. The products include such general purpose synthetic rubbers as polybutylene, polybutadiene, and polyisoprene.

Neodymium(III) chloride is also used to modify titanium dioxide. The latter is one of the most popular inorganic photocatalyst for decomposition of phenol, various dyes and other waste water contaminants. The catalytic action of titanium oxide has to be activated by UV light, i.e. artificial illumination. However, modifying titanium oxide with neodymium(III) chloride allows catalysis under visible illumination, such as sun light. The modified catalyst is prepared by chemical coprecipitation–peptization method by ammonium hydroxide from mixture of TiCl_{4} and NdCl_{3} in aqueous solution). This process is used commercially on large scale on 1000 liter reactor for using in photocatalytic self-cleaning paints.

=== Corrosion protection ===
Other applications are being developed. For example, it was reported that coating of aluminium or various aluminium alloys produces very corrosion-resistance surface, which then resisted immersion into concentrated aqueous solution of NaCl for two months without sign of pitting. The coating is produced either by immersion into aqueous solution of NdCl_{3} for a week or by electrolytic deposition using the same solution. In comparison with traditional chromium based corrosion inhibitors, NdCl_{3} and other rare-earth salts are environment friendly and much less toxic to humans and animals.

The protective action of NdCl_{3} on aluminium alloys is based on formation of insoluble neodymium hydroxide. Being a chloride, NdCl_{3} itself is a corrosive agent, which is sometimes used for corrosion testing of ceramics.

=== Labeling of organic molecules ===
Lanthanides, including neodymium are famous for their bright luminescence and therefore are widely used as fluorescent labels. In particular, NdCl_{3} has been incorporated into organic molecules, such as DNA, which could be then easily traced using a fluorescence microscope during various physical and chemical reactions.

== Health issues ==
Neodymium(III) chloride does not seem toxic to humans and animals (approximately similar to table salt). The LD_{50} (dose at which there is 50% mortality) for animals is about 3.7 g per kg of body weight (mouse, oral), 0.15 g/kg (rabbit, intravenous injection). Mild irritation of skin occurs upon exposure with 500 mg during 24 hrs (Draize test on rabbits). Substances with LD_{50} above 2 g/kg are considered non-toxic.

== See also ==
- Lanthanoid
- Neodymium-doped yttrium lithium fluoride
