= Uranium chloride =

Uranium chloride may refer to:

- Uranium trichloride (uranium(III) chloride), UCl_{3}
- Uranium tetrachloride (uranium(IV) chloride), UCl_{4}
- Uranium pentachloride (uranium(V) chloride), UCl_{5}
- Uranium hexachloride (uranium(VI) chloride), UCl_{6}

== See also ==
- Uranyl chloride, UO_{2}Cl_{2}
