= Uranium bromide =

Uranium bromide may refer to:

- Uranium tetrabromide, UBr_{4}
- Uranium pentabromide, UBr_{5}
