= Cerium(III) chloride =

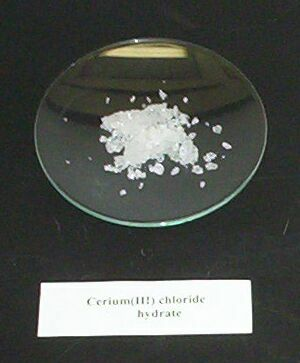
- Cerium(III) chloride

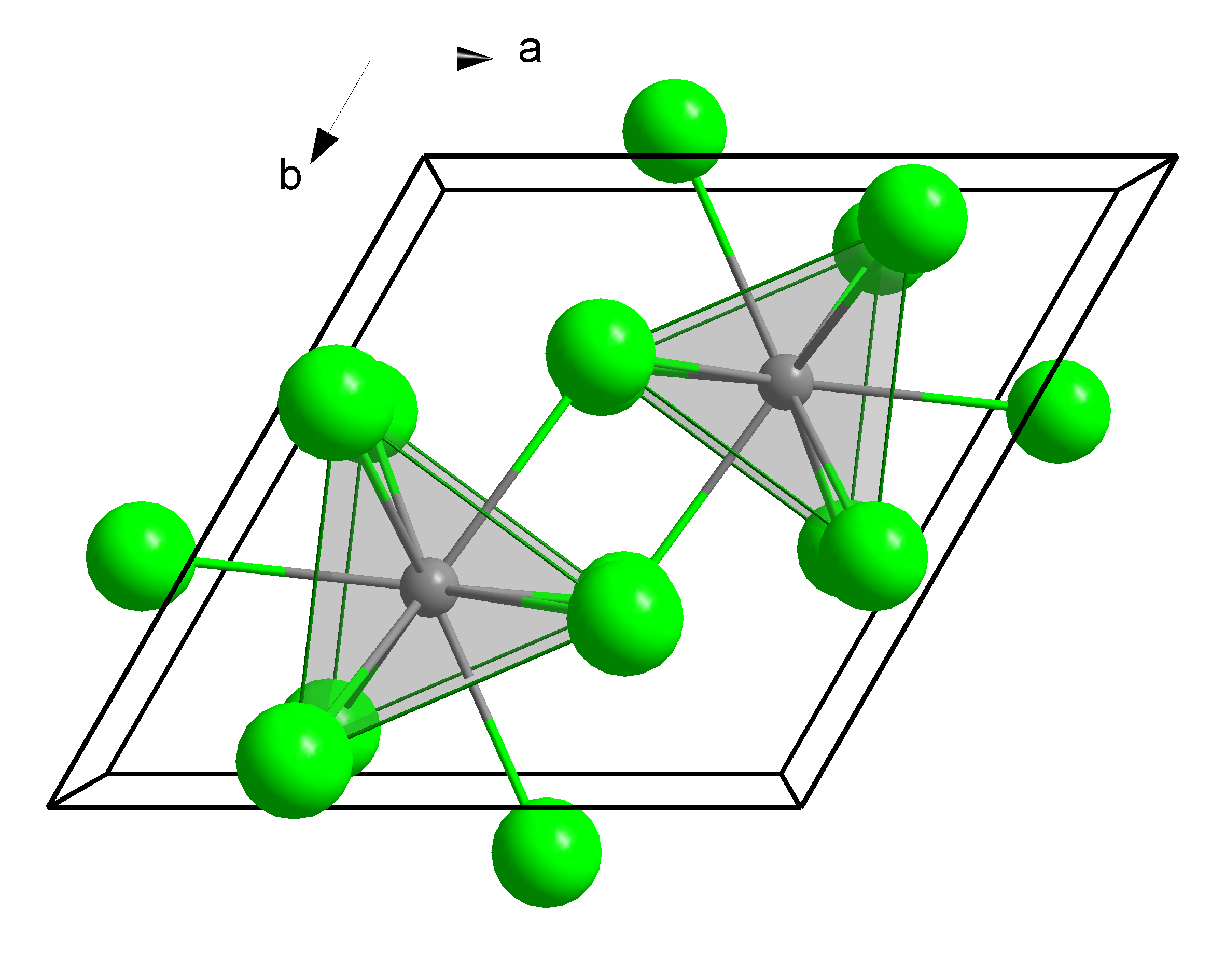

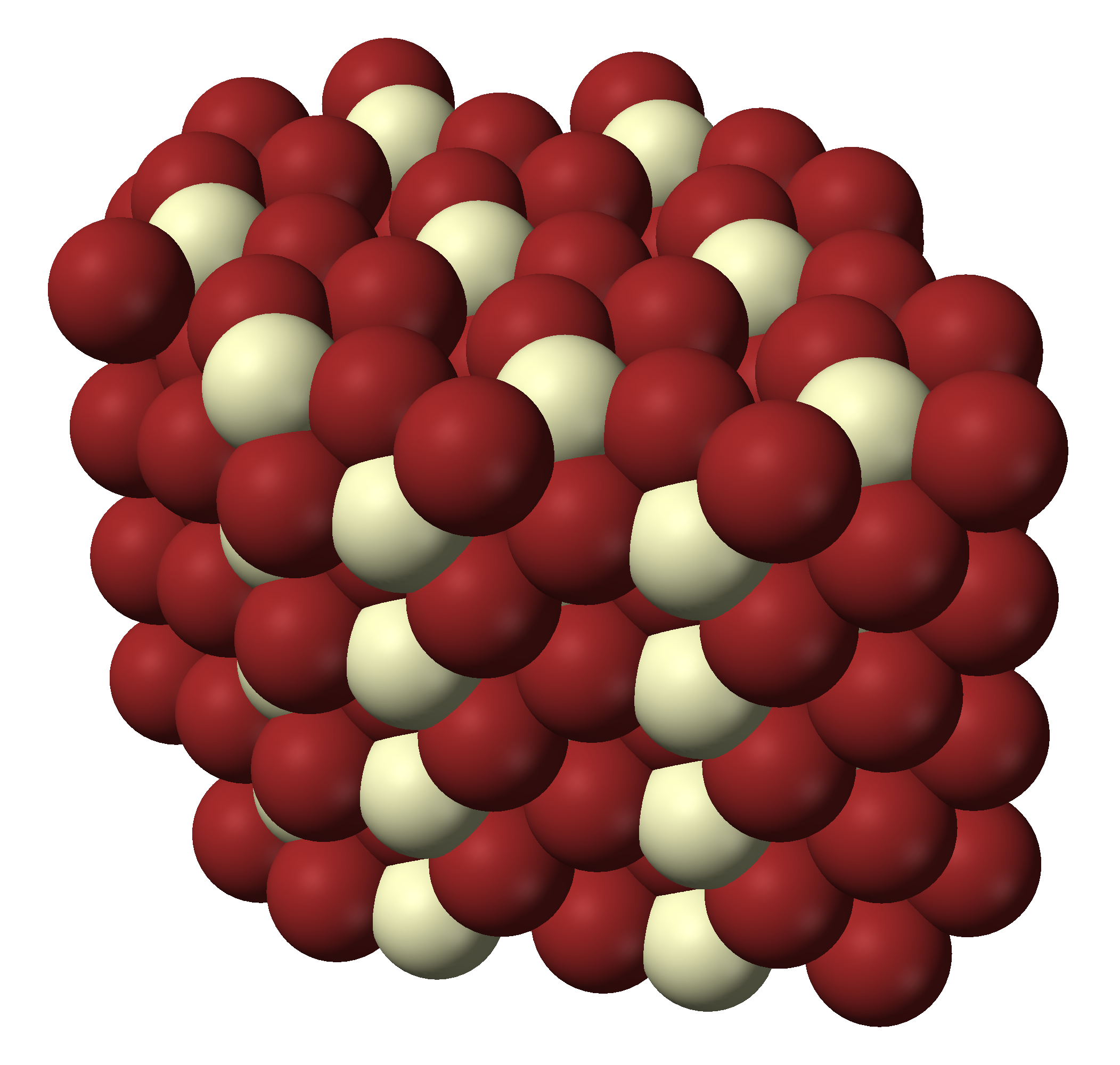

Names
- IUPAC names Cerium(III) chloride Cerium trichloride
- Other names Cerous chloride

Identifiers
CAS Number	7790-86-5; 18618-55-8 (heptahydrate)
3D model (JSmol)	Interactive image
ChEBI	CHEBI:35458
ChemSpider	23038
ECHA InfoCard	100.029.298
EC Number	232-227-8
Gmelin Reference	1828
PubChem CID	24636
UNII	TH8E3IE00V; 188BE3J495 (heptahydrate)
CompTox Dashboard (EPA)	DTXSID1037199
- InChI: InChI=1S/Ce.3ClH/h;3*1H/q+3;;;/p-3 Key: VYLVYHXQOHJDJL-UHFFFAOYSA-K; InChI=1/Ce.3ClH/h;3*1H/q+3;;;/p-3 Key: VYLVYHXQOHJDJL-DFZHHIFOAZ
- SMILES: [Cl-].[Cl-].[Cl-].[Ce+3]

Properties
Chemical formula	CeCl_{3}
Molar mass	246.48 g/mol (anhydrous); 372.58 g/mol (heptahydrate)
Appearance	fine white powder
Density	3.97 g/cm^{3}
Melting point	817 °C (1,503 °F; 1,090 K) (anhydrous); 90 °C (heptahydrate, decomposes)
Boiling point	1,727 °C (3,141 °F; 2,000 K)
Solubility	soluble in alcohol
Magnetic susceptibility (χ)	+2490.0·10^{−6} cm^{3}/mol

Structure
Crystal structure	hexagonal (UCl_{3} type), hP8
Space group	P6_{3}/m, No. 176
Coordination geometry	Tricapped trigonal prismatic (nine-coordinate)

Hazards
- GHS labelling
Pictograms	(GHS05: Corrosive) (GHS07: Exclamation mark) (GHS09: Environmental hazard)
Signal word	Danger
Hazard statements	H315, H318, H319, H335, H410
Precautionary statements	P261, P264, P271, P273, P280, P302+P352, P304+P340, P305+P351+P338, P310, P312, P321, P332+P313, P337+P313, P362, P391, P403+P233, P405, P501
Flash point	Non-flammable

Related compounds
Other anions	Cerium(III) oxide Cerium(III) fluoride Cerium(III) bromide Cerium(III) iodide
Other cations	Lanthanum(III) chloride Praseodymium(III) chloride
- Except where otherwise noted, data are given for materials in their standard state (at 25 °C [77 °F], 100 kPa). verify (what is ?) Infobox references

Cerium(III) chloride (CeCl_{3}), also known as cerous chloride or cerium trichloride, is a compound of cerium and chlorine. It is a white hygroscopic salt; it rapidly absorbs water to form hydrates, which may be of variable composition.The hexa- and heptahydrate CeCl_{3}·7H_{2}O are known. All forms are highly soluble in water, and the anhydrous derivative is soluble in ethanol and acetone.

== Preparation of anhydrous CeCl_{3} ==
Simple rapid heating of the hydrate alone may cause small amounts of hydrolysis.

A useful form of anhydrous CeCl_{3} can be prepared if care is taken to heat the heptahydrate gradually to 140 °C (284 °F) over many hours under vacuum. This may or may not contain a little CeOCl from hydrolysis, but it is suitable for use with organolithium and Grignard reagents. Pure anhydrous CeCl_{3} can be made by dehydration of the hydrate either by slowly heating to 400 °C (752 °F) with 4–6 equivalents of ammonium chloride under high vacuum, or by heating with an excess of thionyl chloride for three hours. The anhydrous halide may alternatively be prepared from cerium metal and hydrogen chloride. It is usually purified by high temperature sublimation under high vacuum. Soxhlet extraction of CeCl_{3} with thf gives CeCl_{3}(thf)_{1.04}.

== Uses ==
Cerium(III) chloride can be used as a starting point for the preparation of other cerium salts, such as the Lewis acid cerium(III) trifluoromethanesulfonate.

=== Organic synthesis ===
Cerium(III) chloride is a reagent in several procedures used in organic synthesis. Luche reduction of alpha, beta-unsaturated carbonyl compounds has become a popular method in organic synthesis, where CeCl_{3}·7H_{2}O is used in conjunction with sodium borohydride. For example, carvone gives only the allylic alcohol 1 and none of the saturated alcohol 2. Without CeCl_{3}, a mixture of 1 and 2 is formed.

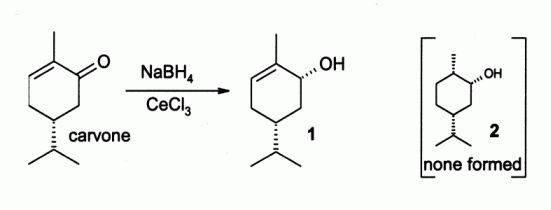

It can also deprotect MEM group to alcohol in the presence of other acetal protecting groups (e.g. THP.)

Another use in organic synthesis is for alkylation of ketones, which would otherwise form enolates if simple organolithium reagents were to be used. For example, compound 3 would be expected to simply form an enolate without CeCl_{3} being present, but in the presence of CeCl_{3} alkylation occurs:

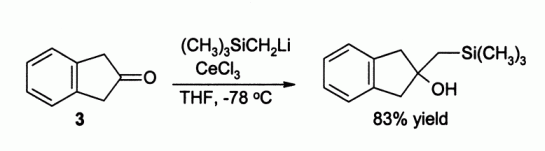

Organolithium reagents work more effectively in this reaction than do Grignard reagents.
