= Cerium(III) bromide =

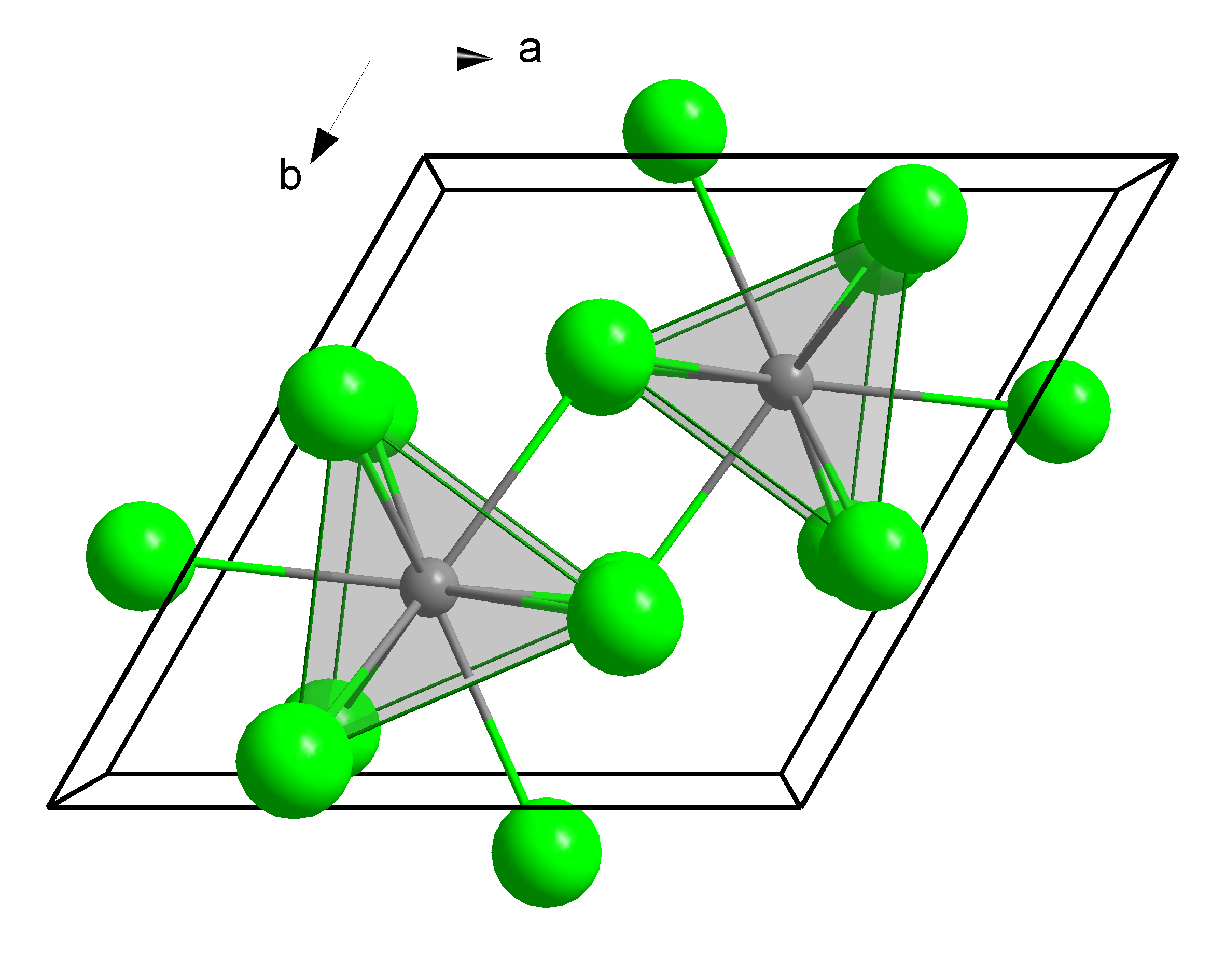

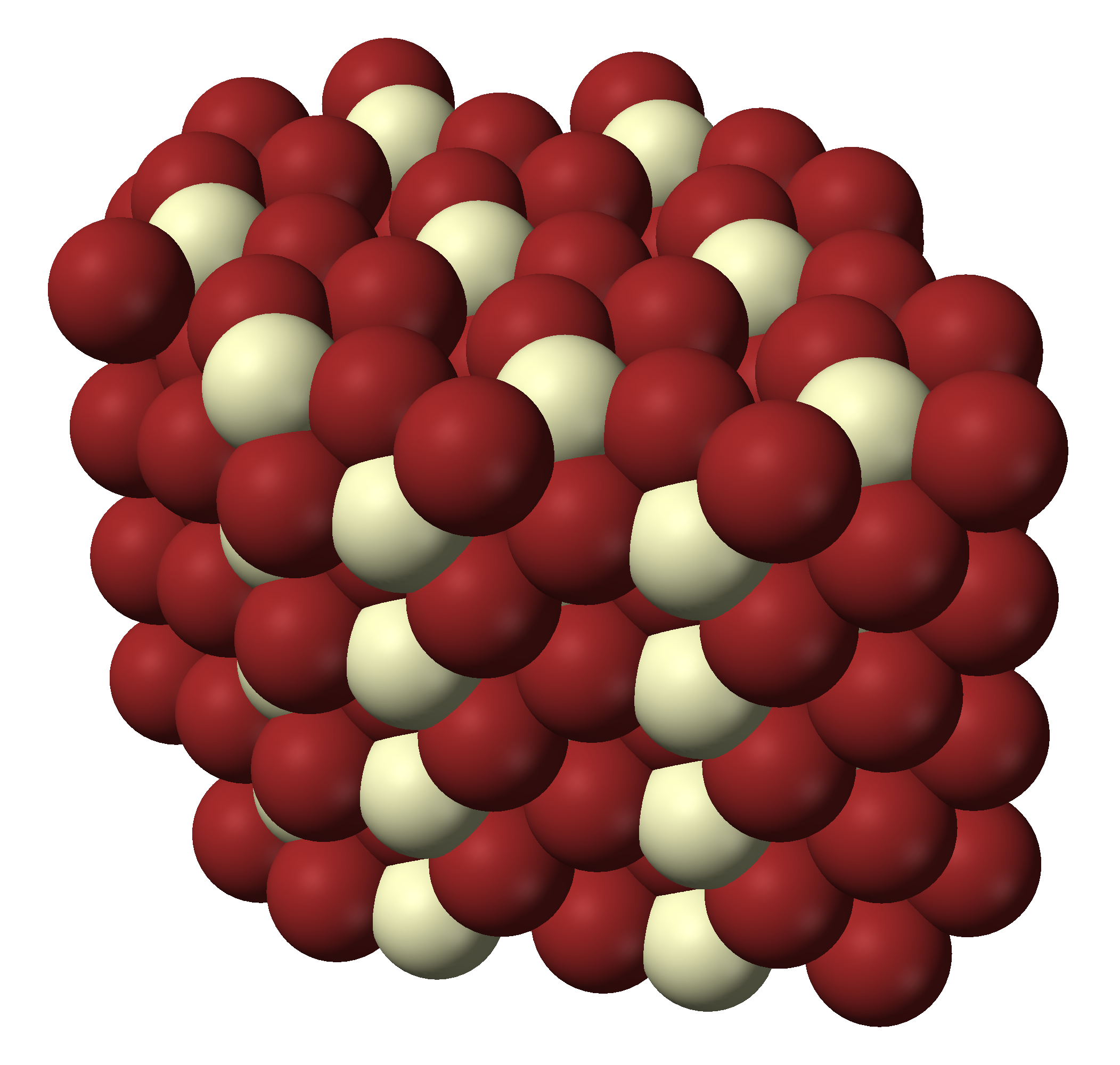

Names
- IUPAC name Cerium(III) bromide
- Other names Cerium tribromide Cerous bromide

Identifiers
CAS Number	14457-87-5
3D model (JSmol)	Interactive image
ChemSpider	76185
ECHA InfoCard	100.034.936
EC Number	238-447-0
PubChem CID	292780
UNII	GEM75FEL39
CompTox Dashboard (EPA)	DTXSID60932338
- InChI: InChI=1S/3BrH.Ce/h3*1H;/q;;;+3/p-3 Key: MOOUSOJAOQPDEH-UHFFFAOYSA-K; InChI=1/3BrH.Ce/h3*1H;/q;;;+3/p-3 Key: MOOUSOJAOQPDEH-DFZHHIFOAB
- SMILES: [Ce+3].[Br-].[Br-].[Br-]

Properties
Chemical formula	CeBr_{3}
Molar mass	379.828 g/mol
Appearance	grey to white solid, hygroscopic
Density	5.1 g/cm^{3}, solid
Melting point	722 °C (1,332 °F; 995 K)
Boiling point	1,457 °C (2,655 °F; 1,730 K)
Solubility in water	4.56 mol kg^{−1} (153.8 g/100 g)

Structure
Crystal structure	hexagonal (UCl_{3} type), hP8
Space group	P6_{3}/m, No. 176
Coordination geometry	Tricapped trigonal prismatic (nine-coordinate)

Hazards
- GHS labelling
Pictograms	(GHS07: Exclamation mark)
Signal word	Warning
Hazard statements	H315, H319, H335
Flash point	Non-flammable

Related compounds
Other anions	Cerium(III) fluoride Cerium(III) chloride Cerium(III) iodide
Other cations	Lanthanum(III) bromide Praseodymium(III) bromide
- Except where otherwise noted, data are given for materials in their standard state (at 25 °C [77 °F], 100 kPa). verify (what is ?) Infobox references

Cerium(III) bromide is an inorganic compound with the formula CeBr_{3}. This white hygroscopic solid is of interest as a component of scintillation counters.

== Preparation and basic properties ==
The compound has been known since at least 1899, when Muthman and Stützel reported its preparation from cerium sulfide and gaseous HBr. Aqueous solutions of CeBr_{3} can be prepared from the reaction of Ce_{2}(CO_{3})_{3}·H_{2}O with HBr. The product, CeBr_{3}·H_{2}O can be dehydrated by heating with NH_{4}Br followed by sublimation of residual NH_{4}Br. CeBr_{3} can be distilled at reduced pressure (~ 0.1 Pa) in a quartz ampoule at 875-880 °C. Like the related salt CeCl_{3}, the bromide absorbs water on exposure to moist air. The compound melts congruently at 722 °C, and well ordered single crystals may be produced using standard crystal growth methods like Bridgman or Czochralski.

CeBr_{3} adopts the hexagonal, UCl_{3}-type crystal structure with the P6_{3}/m space group. The cerium ions are 9-coordinate and adopt a tricapped trigonal prismatic geometry. The cerium–bromine bond lengths are 3.11 Å and 3.16 Å.

== Applications ==
CeBr_{3}-doped lanthanum bromide single crystals are known to exhibit superior scintillation properties for applications in the security, medical imaging, and geophysics detectors.

Undoped single crystals of CeBr_{3} have shown promise as a γ-ray scintillation detector in nuclear non-proliferation testing, medical imaging, environmental remediation, and oil exploration.

== Suppliers ==
- Sigma-Aldrich
