= Lanthanum(III) telluride =

Identifiers
CAS Number	12031-53-7
3D model (JSmol)	Interactive image
- InChI: InChI=1S/2La.3Te/q2*+3;3*-2 Key: BWAHQYYJFJVQRX-UHFFFAOYSA-N
- SMILES: [La+3].[La+3].[Te-2].[Te-2].[Te-2]

Properties
Chemical formula	La_{2}Te_{3}
Molar mass	660.61 g·mol^{−1}
Appearance	grey solid
- Except where otherwise noted, data are given for materials in their standard state (at 25 °C [77 °F], 100 kPa). Infobox references

Lanthanum(III) telluride is an inorganic compound, one of the tellurides of lanthanum, with the chemical formula La_{2}Te_{3}. Lanthanum(III) telluride is prepared by oxidizing a mixture of lanthanum, tellurium and sodium carbonate at 400 °C. There are also literature reports on preparing lanthanum(III) telluride using lanthanum(III) chloride and tellurium as raw materials. In the reaction, tellurium is first oxidized to +4 oxidation state, and then hydrazine hydrate is reduced to −2. Various phases such as CuLaTe_{2} and Cu_{4}La_{2}Te_{5} can be formed in the La_{2}Te_{3}-Cu_{2}Te system.
