= Lanthanum(III) bromide =

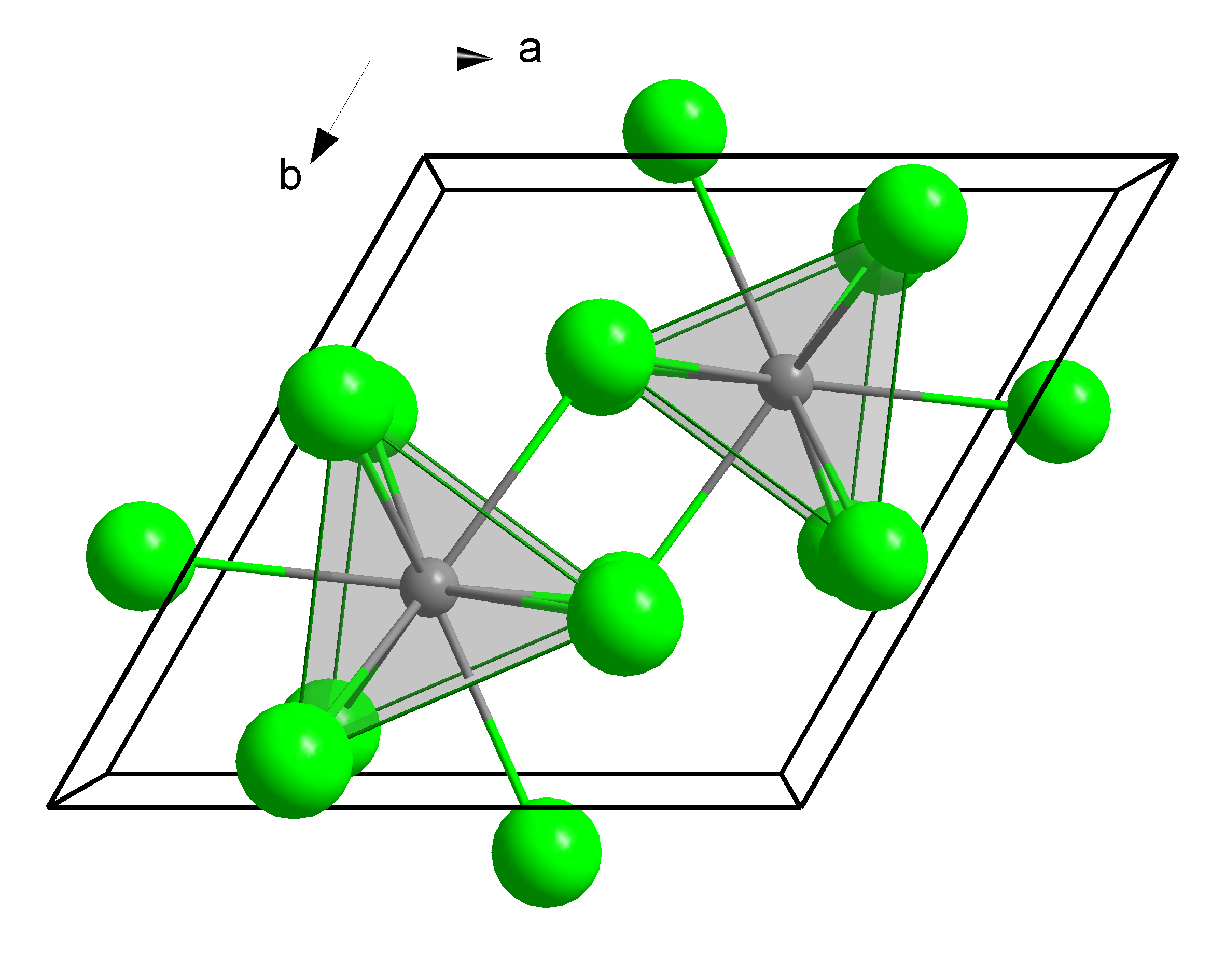

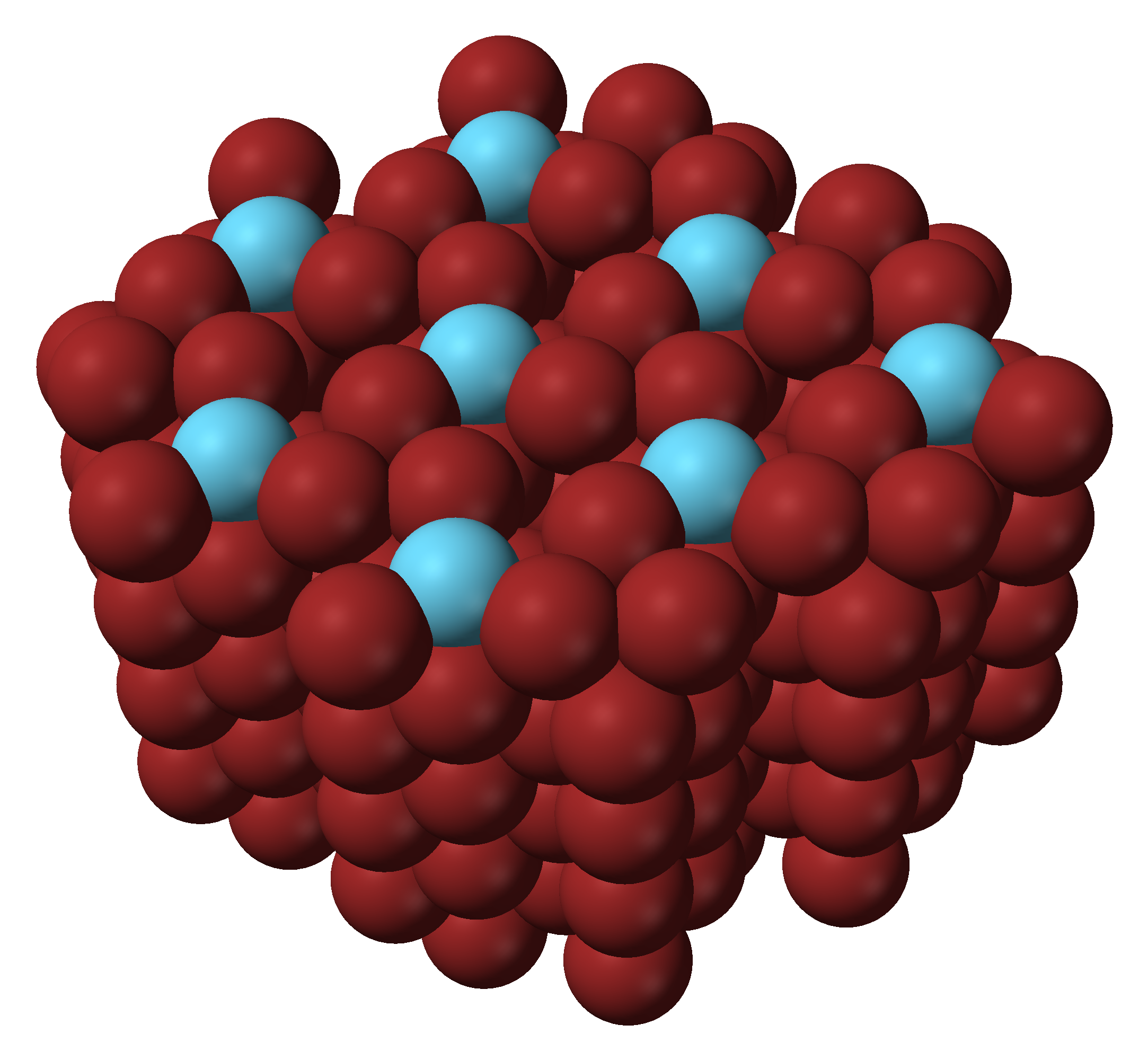

Names
- IUPAC name Lanthanum(III) bromide
- Other names Lanthanum tribromide

Identifiers
CAS Number	13536-79-3
3D model (JSmol)	Interactive image
ChemSpider	75393
ECHA InfoCard	100.033.527
EC Number	236-896-7
PubChem CID	83563
CompTox Dashboard (EPA)	DTXSID9065526
- InChI: InChI=1S/3BrH.La/h3*1H;/q;;;+3/p-3 Key: XKUYOJZZLGFZTC-UHFFFAOYSA-K; InChI=1/3BrH.La/h3*1H;/q;;;+3/p-3 Key: XKUYOJZZLGFZTC-DFZHHIFOAJ
- SMILES: Br[La](Br)Br

Properties
Chemical formula	LaBr_{3}
Molar mass	378.62 g/mol (anhydrous)
Appearance	white solid, hygroscopic
Density	5.06 g/cm^{3}, solid
Melting point	783 °C (1,441 °F; 1,056 K)
Boiling point	1,577 °C (2,871 °F; 1,850 K)
Solubility in water	Very soluble

Structure
Crystal structure	hexagonal (UCl_{3} type), hP8
Space group	P6_{3}/m, No. 176
Coordination geometry	Tricapped trigonal prismatic (nine-coordinate)

Hazards
- GHS labelling
Pictograms	(GHS07: Exclamation mark)
Signal word	Warning
Hazard statements	H315, H319, H335
Precautionary statements	P261, P264, P271, P280, P302+P352, P304+P340, P305+P351+P338, P312, P321, P332+P313, P337+P313, P362, P403+P233, P405, P501
Flash point	not flammable

Related compounds
Other anions	Lanthanum(III) fluoride Lanthanum(III) chloride Lanthanum(III) iodide
Other cations	Cerium(III) bromide Praseodymium(III) bromide
- Except where otherwise noted, data are given for materials in their standard state (at 25 °C [77 °F], 100 kPa). verify (what is ?) Infobox references

Lanthanum(III) bromide (LaBr_{3}) is an inorganic halide salt of lanthanum. When pure, it is a colorless white powder. The single crystals of LaBr_{3} are hexagonal crystals with melting point of 783 °C. It is highly hygroscopic and water-soluble. The salt forms several hydrates with general formula LaBr_{3}·xH_{2}O. It is often used as a source of lanthanum in chemical synthesis and as a scintillation material in certain applications.

== Lanthanum bromide scintillation detector ==
The scintillator material cerium activated lanthanum bromide (LaBr_{3}:Ce) was first produced in 2001. LaBr_{3}:Ce-based radiation detectors offer improved energy resolution, fast emission and excellent temperature and linearity characteristics. Typical energy resolution at 662 keV is 3% as compared to sodium iodide detectors at 7%. The improved resolution is due to a photoelectron yield that is 160% greater than is achieved with sodium iodide. Another advantage of LaBr_{3}:Ce is the nearly flat photo emission over a 70 °C temperature range (~1% change in light output).

Today LaBr_{3} detectors are offered with bialkali photomultiplier tubes (PMT) that can be two inches in diameter and 10 or more inches long. However, miniature packaging can be obtained by the use of a silicon drift detector (SDD) or a silicon photomultiplier (SiPM). These UV enhanced diodes provide excellent wavelength matching to the 380 nm emission of LaBr_{3}. The SDD is not as sensitive to temperature and bias drift as PMT. The reported spectroscopy performance of the SDD configuration resulted in a 2.8% energy resolution at 662 keV for the detector sizes considered.

LaBr_{3} introduces an enhanced set of capabilities to a range of gamma spectroscopy radioisotope detection and identification systems used in the homeland security market. Isotope identification utilizes several techniques (known as algorithms) which rely on the detector's ability to discriminate peaks. The improvements in resolution allow more accurate peak discrimination in ranges where isotopes often have many overlapping peaks. This leads to better isotope classification. Screening of all types (pedestrians, cargo, conveyor belts, shipping containers, vehicles, etc.) often requires accurate isotopic identification to differentiate concerning materials from non-concerning materials (medical isotopes in patients, naturally occurring radioactive materials, etc.) Heavy R&D and deployment of instruments utilizing LaBr_{3} is expected in the upcoming years.
