= Uranium pentabromide =

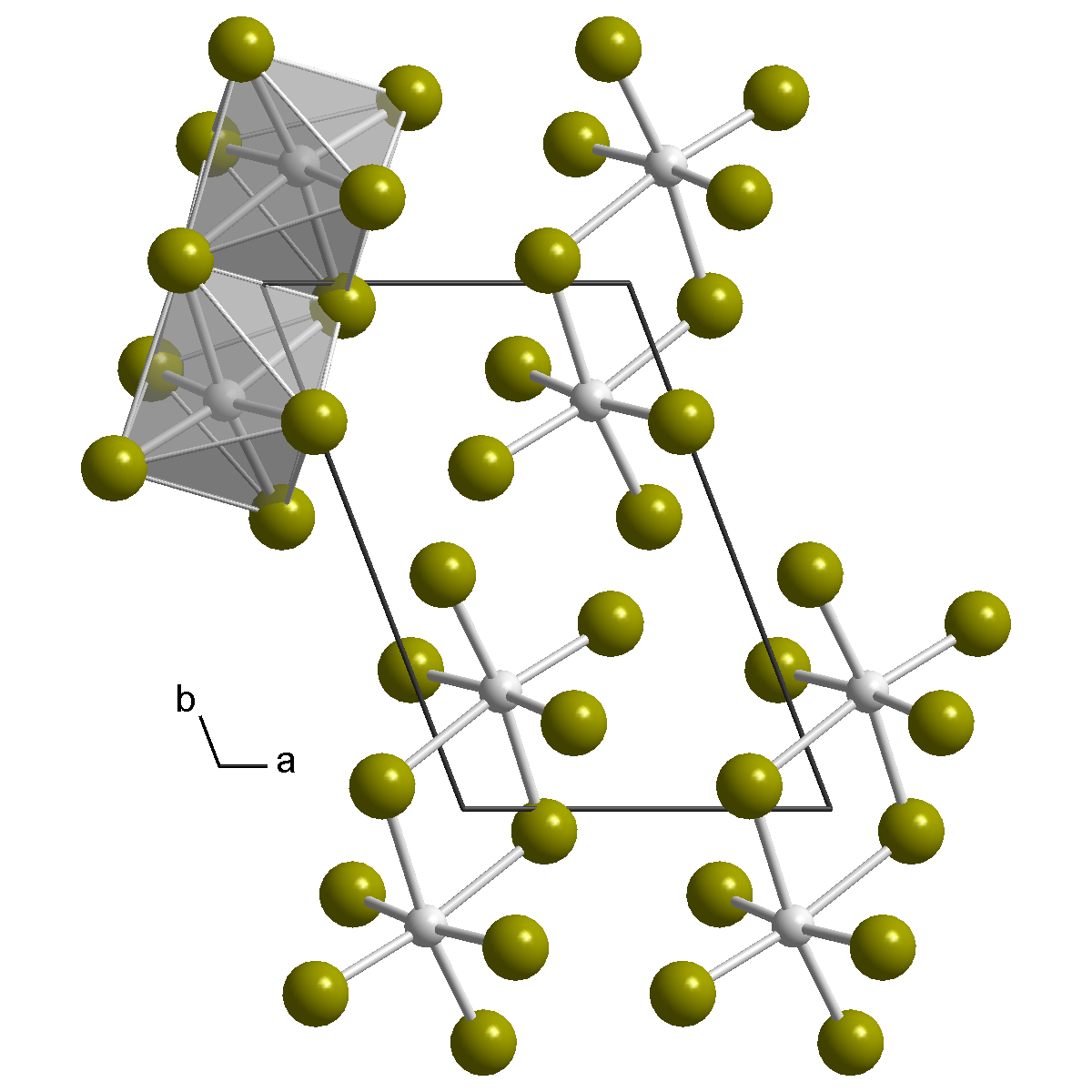

Identifiers
CAS Number	13775-16-1
3D model (JSmol)	Interactive image
ChemSpider	123110
PubChem CID	139592
CompTox Dashboard (EPA)	DTXSID40160298
- InChI: InChI=1S/5BrH.U/h5*1H;/q;;;;;+5/p-5 Key: UAGSJUTVOXEWHQ-UHFFFAOYSA-I
- SMILES: Br[U](Br)(Br)(Br)Br

Properties
Chemical formula	UBr_{5}
Molar mass	637.549 g/mol
Appearance	dark brown, hygroscopic crystalline solid
Solubility in water	decomposes
- Except where otherwise noted, data are given for materials in their standard state (at 25 °C [77 °F], 100 kPa). Infobox references

Uranium pentabromide is an inorganic chemical compound with the formula U_{2}Br_{10}.

== Synthesis ==
The compound is made by reacting the elements in an acetonitrile solvent, or by reacting bromine with uranium metal or uranium tetrabromide at 55 °C (131 °F; 328 K).

== Properties ==
Uranium pentabromide is a hygroscopic dark brown solid that decomposes in water and most organic solvents, the exceptions being acetonitrile or dichloromethane. The compound is rather unstable and difficult to purify, decomposing at 80 °C (176 °F; 353 K) into uranium tetrabromide and bromine. The crystal structure is the same as that of β-UCl_{5}, which is triclinic and consists of U_{2}Br_{10} dimers.

== Complexes ==
Stable complexes of the form UBr_{5}L are known with such ligands as triphenylphosphine oxide and hexamethylphosphoramide, and are obtained by brominating UBr_{4} in the presence of the desired ligand. In addition, it is possible to obtain a hexabromouranate(V) salt by reacting UBr_{5} with a monovalent bromide in thionyl bromide:

U_{2}Br_{10} + 2MBr → 2M^{+}[UBr_{6}]^{−}
