= Neodymium fluoride =

Neodymium fluoride may refer to:

- Neodymium(II) fluoride (Neodymium difluoride), NdF_{2}
- Neodymium(III) fluoride (Neodymium trifluoride), NdF_{3}
- Neodymium(IV) fluoride (Neodymium tetrafluoride), NdF_{4}
