= Pentachloride =

A pentachloride is a compound or ion that contains five chlorine atoms or ions. Common pentachlorides include:

- Antimony pentachloride, SbCl_{5}
- Arsenic pentachloride, AsCl_{5}
- Molybdenum pentachloride, MoCl_{5}
- Niobium pentachloride, NbCl_{5}
- Phosphorus pentachloride, PCl_{5}
- Protactinium pentachloride, PaCl_{5}
- Osmium pentachloride, OsCl_{5}
- Rhenium pentachloride, Re_{2}Cl_{10}
- Tantalum pentachloride, TaCl_{5}
- Tungsten pentachloride, WCl_{5}
- Uranium pentachloride, UCl_{5}
- Vanadium pentachloride, VCl_{5}
