= Uranium hexachloride =

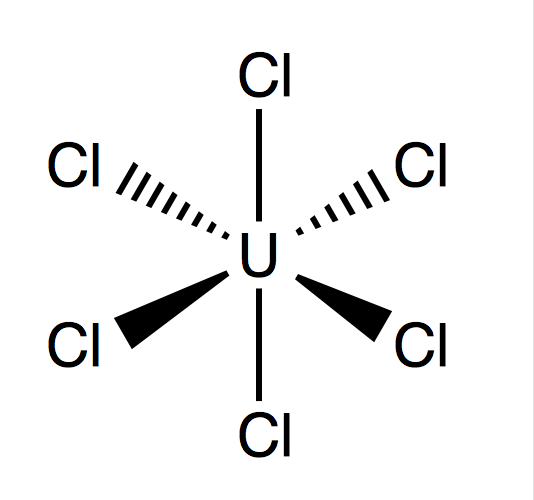

Names
- IUPAC name Uranium(VI) chloride
- Other names Uranium hexachloride Peruranic chloride

Identifiers
CAS Number	161280-02-0
3D model (JSmol)	Interactive image
ChemSpider	57564875
PubChem CID	57346050
- InChI: InChI=1S/6ClH.U/h6*1H;/p-6 Key: XFCORTPUZRSUIZ-UHFFFAOYSA-H
- SMILES: [Cl-].[Cl-].[Cl-].[Cl-].[Cl-].[Cl-].[U]

Properties
Chemical formula	UCl_{6}
Molar mass	450.745 g/mol
Appearance	dark green crystalline solid
Density	3.6 g/cm^{3}
Melting point	177 °C (351 °F; 450 K)

Related compounds
Other anions	Uranium hexafluoride
Other cations	Tungsten hexachloride
Related uranium chlorides	Uranium(III) chloride; Uranium(IV) chloride; Uranium(V) chloride
- Except where otherwise noted, data are given for materials in their standard state (at 25 °C [77 °F], 100 kPa). Infobox references

Uranium hexachloride is the inorganic compound with the formula UCl_{6}. It features uranium in the +6 oxidation state. UCl_{6} hydrolyzes readily but is stable under inert atmosphere. It is soluble in carbon tetrachloride (CCl_{4}). It is a multi-luminescent dark green or black solid with a vapor pressure between 1-3 mmHg at 373.15 K.

== Structure and bonding ==
Uranium hexachloride has an octahedral geometry, with point group O_{h}. Its lattice (dimensions: 10.95 ± 0.02 Å x 6.03 ± 0.01 Å) is hexagonal in shape with three molecules per cell; the average theoretical U-Cl bond is 2.472 Å long (the experimental U-Cl length found by X-ray diffraction is 2.42 Å), and the distance between two adjacent chlorine atoms is 3.65 Å.

== Chemical properties ==
UCl_{6} is stable up to temperatures between 120 °C and 150 °C. The decomposition of UCl_{6} results in a solid phase transition from one crystal form of UCl_{6} to another more stable form, before fully decomposing into UCl_{5}. It decomposes as follows:

2 UCl_{6} (g) → 2 UCl_{5} (s) + Cl_{2} (g)

The activation energy for this reaction is about 40 kcal per mole.

=== Solubility ===
UCl_{6} is not a very soluble compound. It dissolves in CCl_{4} to give a brown solution. It is slightly soluble in isobutyl bromide and in fluorocarbon (C_{7}F_{16}).

Solvents	Temperature (°C)	Grams of UCl_{6}/100g of solution
CCl_{4}	−18	2.64
CCl_{4}	0	4.9
CCl_{4}	20	7.8
6.6% Cl_{2} : 93.4% CCl_{4}	−20	2.4
12.5% Cl_{2} : 87.5% CCl_{4}	−20	2.23
12.5% Cl_{2} : 87.5% CCl_{4}	0	3.98
Liquid Cl_{2}	−33	2.20
CH_{3}Cl	−24	1.16
Benzene	80	Insoluble
Freon 113	45	1.83

=== Reaction with hydrogen fluoride ===
When treated with liquid hydrogen fluoride (HF) at room temperature, UCl_{6} produces UF_{5}.

2 UCl_{6} + 10 HF → 2 UF_{5} + 10 HCl + Cl_{2}

== Synthesis ==
Uranium hexachloride is efficiently prepared from uranium hexafluoride by halide exchange using boron trichloride according to the following idealized equation:

UF_{6} + 2 BCl_{3} → UCl_{6} + 2 BF_{3}

Uranium hexachloride can also be synthesized from the reaction of uranium trioxide (UO_{3}) with a mixture of liquid CCl_{4} and hot chlorine (Cl_{2}). The yield can be increased if the reaction carried out in the presence of UCl_{5}. The UO_{3} is converted to UCl_{5}, which in turn reacts with the excess Cl_{2} to form UCl_{6}. It requires a substantial amount of heat for the reaction to take place; the temperature range is from 65 °C to 170 °C depending on the amount of reactant (ideal temperature 100 °C - 125 °C). The reaction is carried out in a closed gas-tight vessel (for example a glovebox) that can withstand the pressure that builds up.

Step 1: 2 UO_{3} + 5 Cl_{2} → 2 UCl_{5} + 3 O_{2}

Step 2: 2 UCl_{5} + Cl_{2} → 2 UCl_{6}

Overall reaction: 2 UO_{3} + 6 Cl_{2} → 2 UCl_{6} + 3 O_{2}

This metal hexahalide also form upon combining Cl_{2} and UCl_{4} at 350 °C.

Step 1: 2 UCl_{4} + Cl_{2} → 2 UCl_{5}

Step 2: 2 UCl_{5} + Cl_{2} → 2 UCl_{6}

Overall Reaction: UCl_{4} + Cl_{2} → UCl_{6}
