= Neodymium(II) fluoride =

Identifiers
CAS Number	13940-76-6
3D model (JSmol)	Interactive image
ChemSpider	64878739
- InChI: InChI=1S/2FH.Nd/h2*1H;/q;;+2/p-2 Key: VAMOYRLGCGDJEH-UHFFFAOYSA-L
- SMILES: [Nd+2].[F-].[F-]

Properties
Chemical formula	NdF_{2}
Molar mass	182.23
- Except where otherwise noted, data are given for materials in their standard state (at 25 °C [77 °F], 100 kPa). Infobox references

Neodymium(II) fluoride is an inorganic compound with the chemical formula NdF_{2}. It can be obtained by shock compression of neodymium(III) fluoride and neodymium at 1000 °C and above 200 kbar. It can also be obtained by reacting in a eutectic system of neodymium and lithium fluoride-neodymium(III) fluoride at 1100 °C.

== External reading ==
- Liu, Xiaolong; Huang, Chao; Li, Bing (2017). "The Effects of NdF2 on Current Efficiency of Nd Extraction from NdF3-LiF-Nd2O3 Melts". Materials Transactions. 58 (3): 395–399. doi:10.2320/matertrans.MK201611. ISSN 1345-9678.
