= Lanthanum(III) chloride =

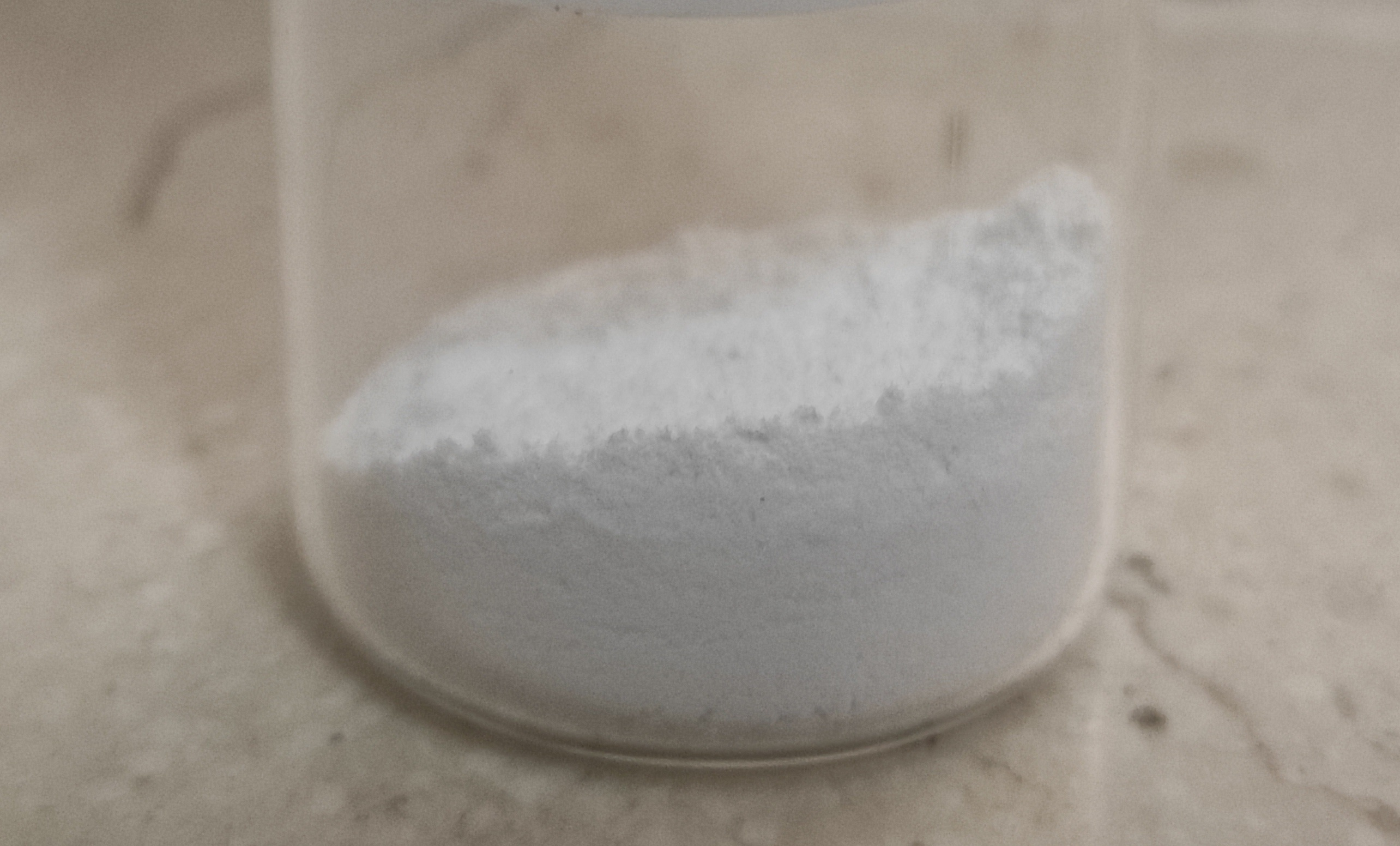
- Lanthanum(III) chloride Anhydrous

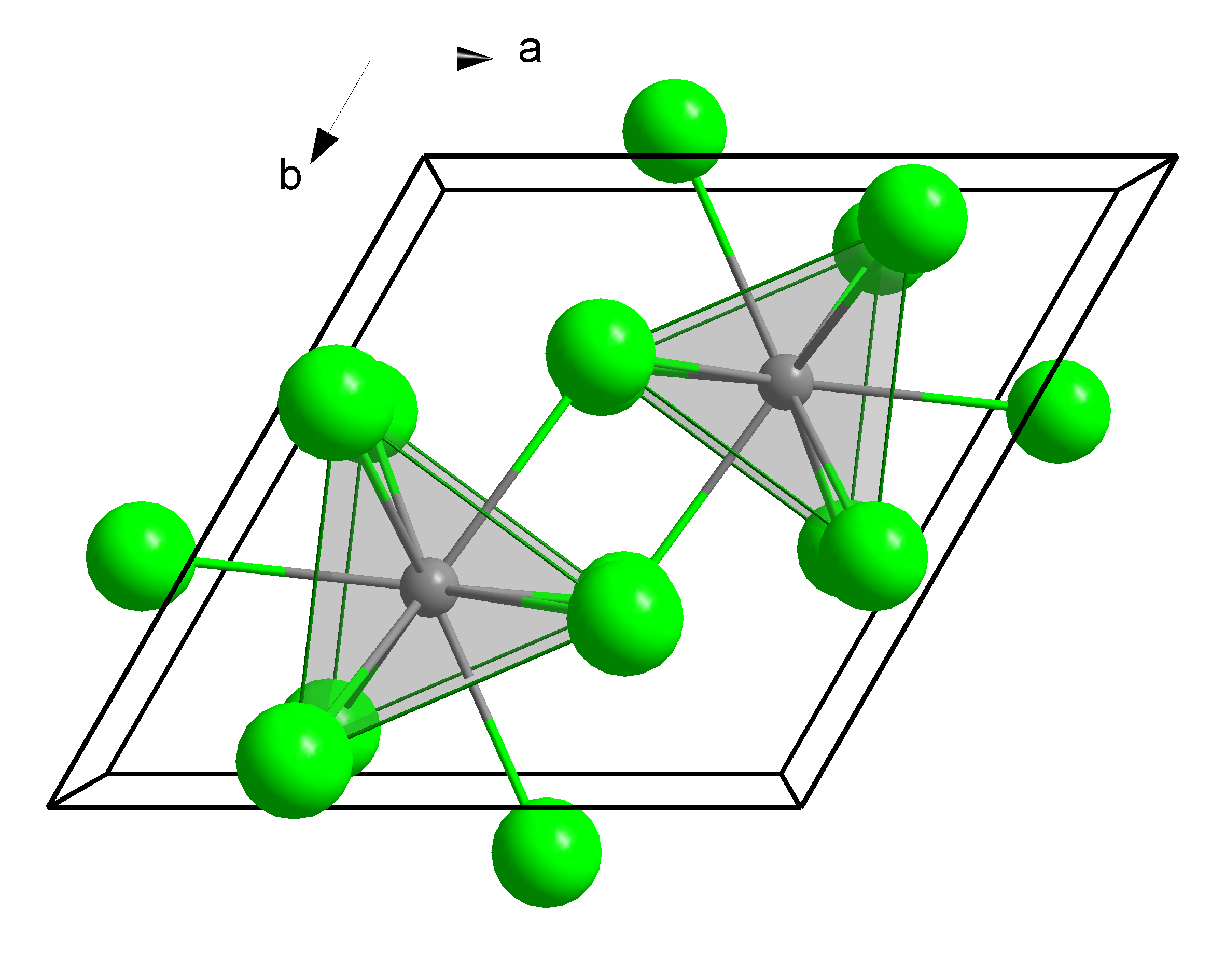

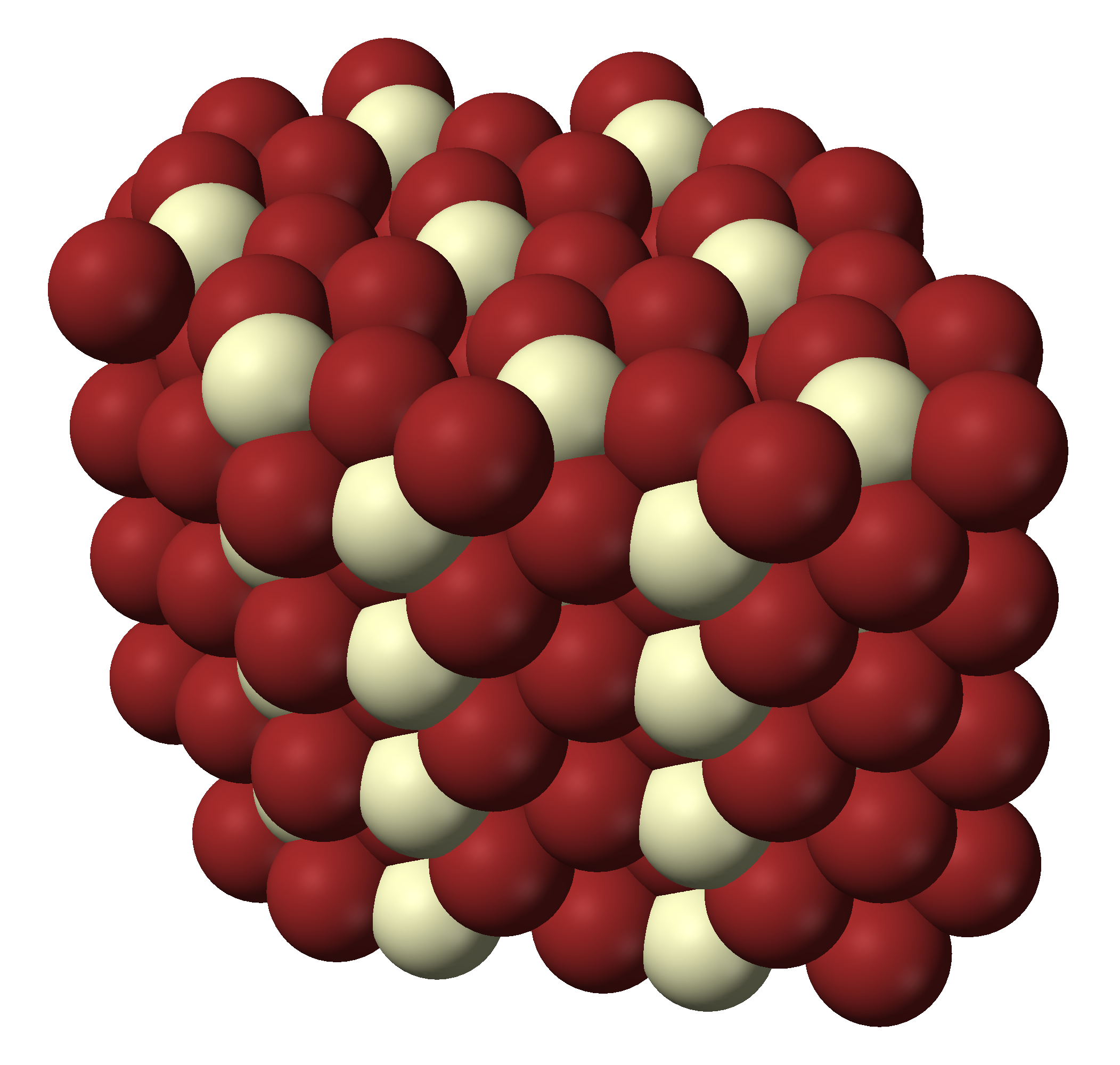

Names
- Other names Lanthanum trichloride

Identifiers
CAS Number	10099-58-8; 10025-84-0 (heptahydrate)
3D model (JSmol)	Interactive image
ChEBI	CHEBI:231515
ChemSpider	58275
ECHA InfoCard	100.030.202
EC Number	233-237-5
PubChem CID	64735
UNII	04M8624OXV; 936G1MX96X (heptahydrate)
CompTox Dashboard (EPA)	DTXSID2051502
- InChI: InChI=1S/3ClH.La/h3*1H;/q;;;+3/p-3 Key: ICAKDTKJOYSXGC-UHFFFAOYSA-K; InChI=1/3ClH.La/h3*1H;/q;;;+3/p-3 Key: ICAKDTKJOYSXGC-DFZHHIFOAJ
- SMILES: Cl[La](Cl)Cl

Properties
Chemical formula	LaCl_{3}
Molar mass	245.264 g/mol (anhydrous); 353.36 g/mol (hexahydrate); 371.37 g/mol (heptahydrate)
Appearance	white odorless powder hygroscopic
Density	3.84 g/cm^{3}
Melting point	858 °C (1,576 °F; 1,131 K) (anhydrous)
Boiling point	1,000 °C (1,830 °F; 1,270 K) (anhydrous)
Solubility in water	957 g/L (25 °C)
Solubility	soluble in ethanol (heptahydrate)

Structure
Crystal structure	hexagonal (UCl_{3} type), hP8
Space group	P6_{3}/m, No. 176
Lattice constant	a = 0.74779 nm, b = 0.74779 nm, c = 0.43745 nm
Formula units (Z)	2
Coordination geometry	Tricapped trigonal prismatic,(nine-coordinate)

Hazards
- GHS labelling
Pictograms	(GHS05: Corrosive) (GHS07: Exclamation mark) (GHS09: Environmental hazard)
Signal word	Danger
Hazard statements	H290, H315, H317, H318, H319, H335, H411
Precautionary statements	P234, P261, P264, P264+P265, P271, P272, P273, P280, P302+P352, P304+P340, P305+P351+P338, P305+P354+P338, P317, P319, P321, P333+P317, P337+P317, P362+P364, P390, P391, P403+P233, P405, P501

Related compounds
Other anions	Lanthanum oxide
Other cations	Cerium(III) chloride
- Except where otherwise noted, data are given for materials in their standard state (at 25 °C [77 °F], 100 kPa). verify (what is ?) Infobox references

Lanthanum chloride is the inorganic compound with the formula LaCl_{3}. It is a common salt of lanthanum which is mainly used in research. It is a white solid that is highly soluble in water and alcohols.

== Preparation ==
Anhydrous lanthanum(III) chloride can be produced by the ammonium chloride route. In the first step, lanthanum oxide is heated with ammonium chloride to produce the ammonium salt of the pentachloride:

La_{2}O_{3} + 10 NH_{4}Cl → 2 (NH_{4})_{2}LaCl_{5} + 6 H_{2}O + 6 NH_{3}

In the second step, the ammonium chloride salt is converted to the trichlorides by heating in a vacuum at 350-400 °C:

(NH_{4})_{2}LaCl_{5} → LaCl_{3} + 2 HCl + 2 NH_{3}

== Uses ==
Lanthanum chloride is also used in biochemical research to block the activity of divalent cation channels, mainly calcium channels. Doped with cerium, it is used as a scintillator material.

In organic synthesis, lanthanum trichloride functions as a mild Lewis acid for converting aldehydes to acetals.

The compound has been identified as a catalyst for the high pressure oxidative chlorination of methane to chloromethane with hydrochloric acid and oxygen. In Fluid Catalytic Cracking (FCC), lanthanum chloride enhances catalysts to convert heavy crude into valuable fuels like gasoline and diesel.

Also used in the field of geology as a very dilute solution, which when combined with the proper acids can help identify small >1% Strontium content in powdered rock samples.

Lanthanum chloride also contributes to environmental remediation by promoting- the catalytic transformation of pollutants, such as nitrogen oxides (NOx), volatile organic compounds (VOCs), sulfur dioxide (SO_{2}), and phosphate ions, into less harmful products. It can also be commercially viable and significantly outperform conventional materials such as ion exchange resins, activated carbons, and iron oxides in water and wastewater treatment, especially for the removal of anionic pollutants.
