= Uranium tetrachloride =

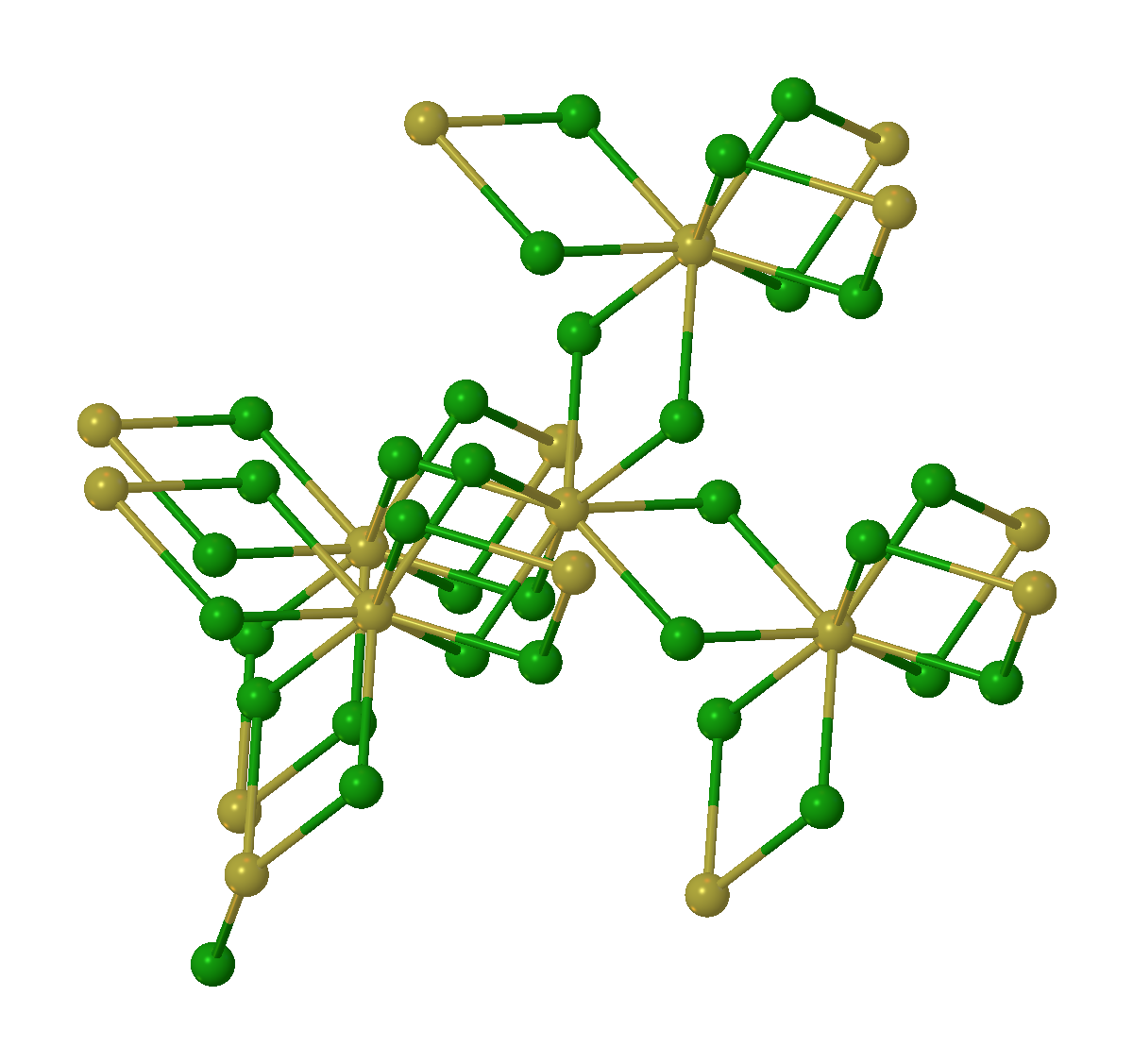
- Uranium Tetrachloride crystal structure

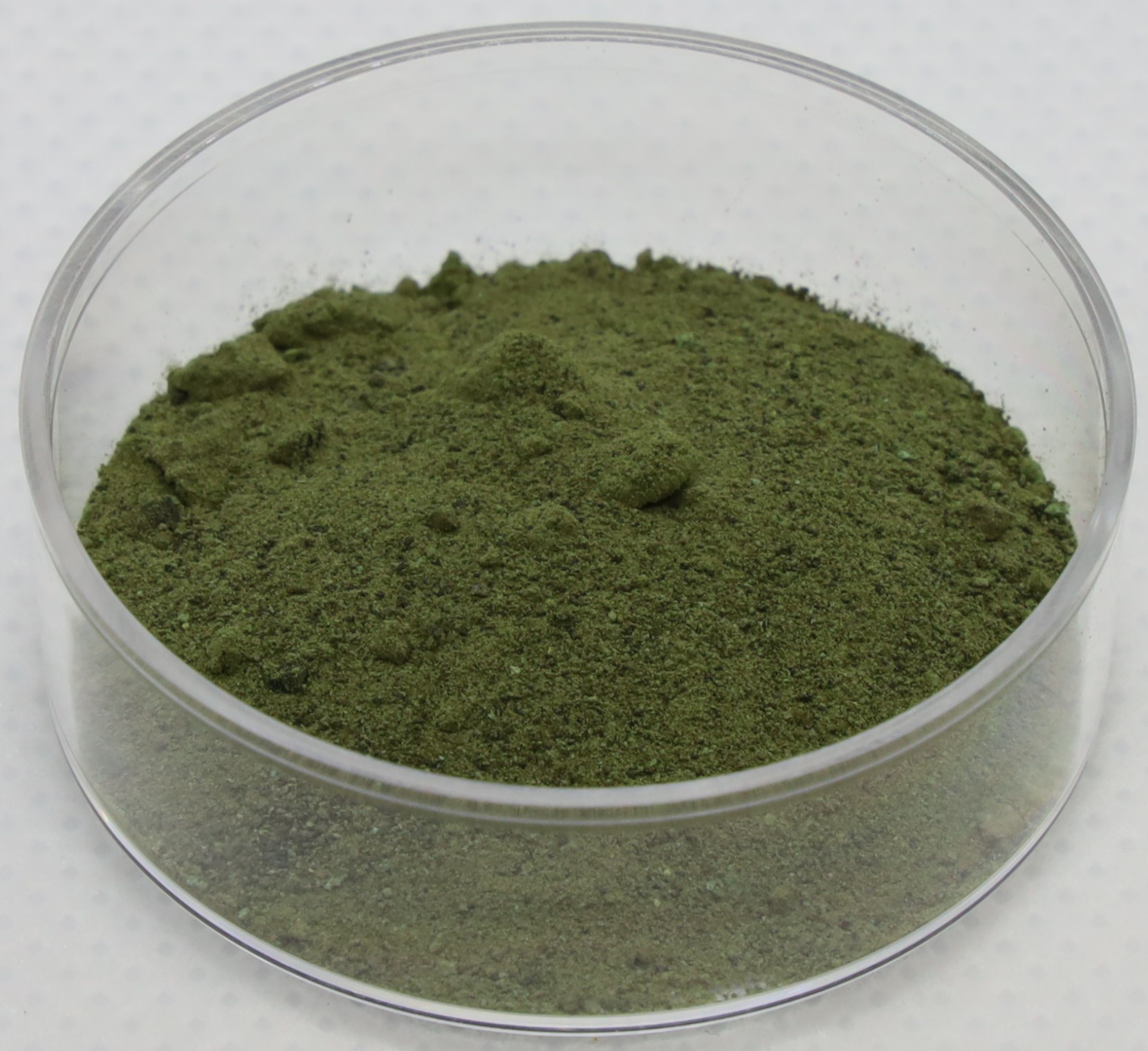

Names
- IUPAC name Uranium(IV) chloride
- Other names Tetrachlorouranium; Uranium tetrachloride Uranous chloride

Identifiers
CAS Number	10026-10-5
3D model (JSmol)	Interactive image
ChemSpider	19969614
ECHA InfoCard	100.030.040
EC Number	233-057-7
PubChem CID	66210
UNII	8E7IB152RL
CompTox Dashboard (EPA)	DTXSID1064906
- InChI: InChI=1S/4ClH.2U/h4*1H;;/q;;;;2*+2/p-4 Key: AYQSGSWJZFIBLR-UHFFFAOYSA-J; InChI=1/4ClH.2U/h4*1H;;/q;;;;2*+2/p-4 Key: AYQSGSWJZFIBLR-XBHQNQODAS
- SMILES: [U+4].[Cl-].[Cl-].[Cl-].[Cl-]

Properties
Chemical formula	UCl_{4}
Molar mass	379.84 g/mol
Appearance	olive green solid
Density	4.87 g/cm^{3}
Melting point	590 °C (1,094 °F; 863 K)
Boiling point	791 °C (1,456 °F; 1,064 K)
Solubility in water	Hydrolysis
Solubility	Soluble in hydrochloric acid

Structure
Crystal structure	Octahedral

Related compounds
Related compounds	uranium trichloride, uranium pentachloride, uranium hexachloride
- Except where otherwise noted, data are given for materials in their standard state (at 25 °C [77 °F], 100 kPa). verify (what is ?) Infobox references

Uranium tetrachloride is an inorganic compound, a salt of uranium and chlorine, with the formula UCl_{4}. It is a hygroscopic olive-green solid. It was used in the electromagnetic isotope separation (EMIS) process of uranium enrichment. It is one of the main starting materials for organouranium chemistry.

== Synthesis and structure ==
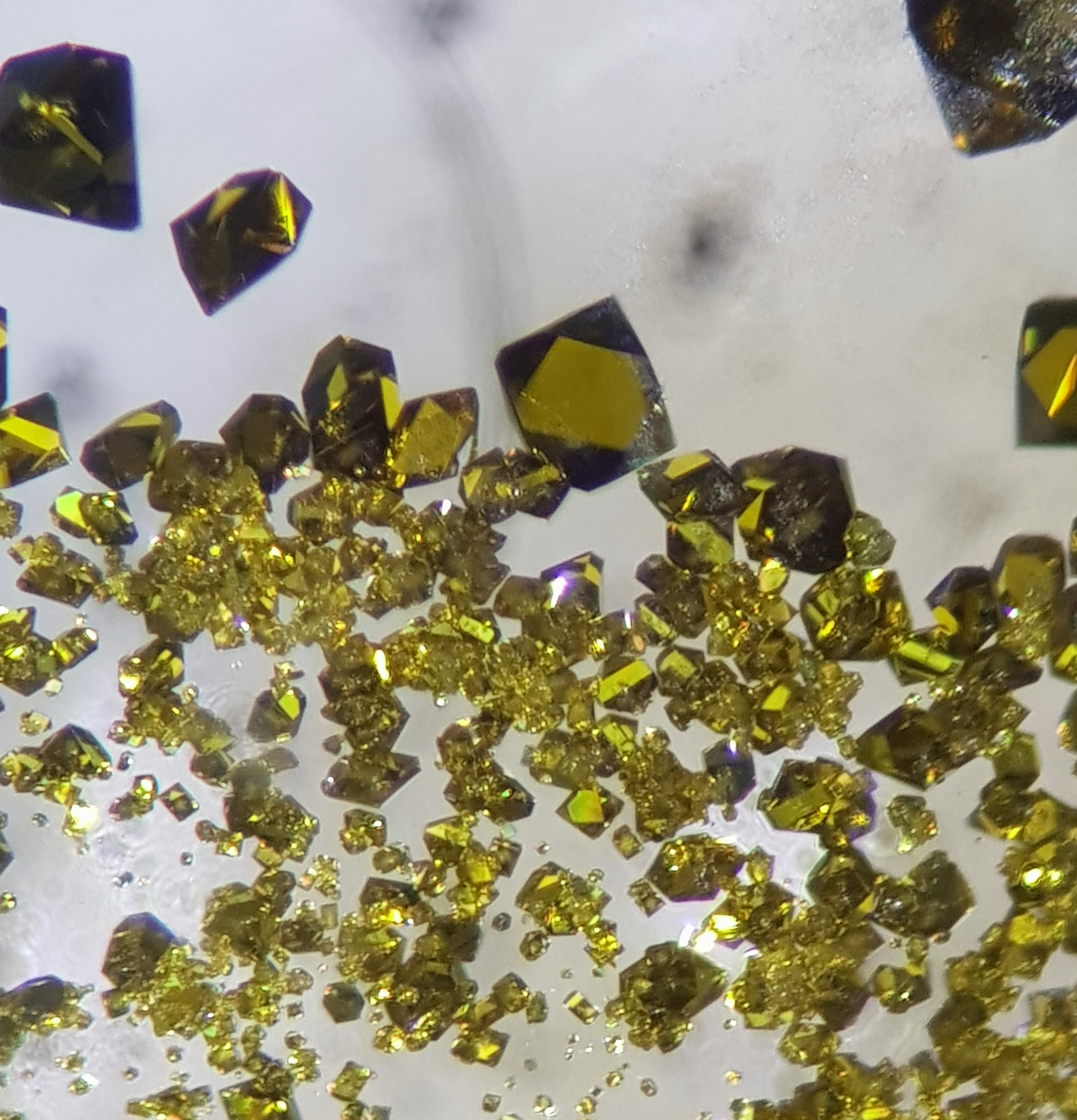
Single crystals of uranium tetrachloride (field of view about 7 mm)

Uranium tetrachloride is synthesised generally by the reaction of uranium trioxide (UO_{3}) and hexachloropropene. Solvent UCl_{4} adducts can be formed by a simpler reaction of UI_{4} with hydrogen chloride in organic solvents.

Uranium tetrachloride also forms the nonahydrate, which can be produced by evaporating a mildly acidic solution of UCl_{4}.

According to X-ray crystallography the uranium centers are eight-coordinate, being surrounded by eight chlorine atoms, four at 264 pm and the other four at 287pm.

== Applications ==
Uranium tetrachloride is produced commercially by the reaction of carbon tetrachloride with pure uranium dioxide UO_{2} at 370 °C. It has been used as feed in the electromagnetic isotope separation (EMIS) process of uranium enrichment. Beginning in 1944, the Oak Ridge Y-12 Plant converted UO_{3} to UCl_{4} feed for the Ernest O. Lawrence's calutrons. Its major benefit was that the uranium tetrachloride used in the calutrons is not as corrosive as the uranium hexafluoride used in most other enrichment technologies. This process was abandoned in the 1950s. In the 1980s Iraq revived this option as part of its nuclear weapons program. In the enrichment process, uranium tetrachloride is ionized into a uranium plasma.

The uranium ions are then accelerated and passed through a strong magnetic field. After traveling along half of a circle, the beam is split into a region nearer the outside wall, which is depleted, and a region nearer the inside wall, which is enriched in ^{235}U. The large amounts of energy required in maintaining the strong magnetic fields as well as the low recovery rates of the uranium feed material and slower more inconvenient facility operation make this an unlikely choice for large scale enrichment plants.

Work is being done in the use of molten uranium chloride–alkali chloride mixtures as reactor fuels in molten salt reactors. Uranium tetrachloride melts dissolved in a lithium chloride–potassium chloride eutectic have also been explored as a means to recover actinides from irradiated nuclear fuels through pyrochemical nuclear reprocessing.

== Safety ==
Like all water soluble uranium salts, uranium tetrachloride is nephrotoxic (poisonous to the kidney) and can cause severe renal damage and acute renal failure if ingested.
