= Cerium(III) iodide =

Names
- IUPAC name Triiodocerium
- Other names Cerous triiodide, Cerium triiodide

Identifiers
CAS Number	7790-87-6
3D model (JSmol)	Interactive image
ChemSpider	109878
ECHA InfoCard	100.029.299
EC Number	232-228-3
PubChem CID	123265
UNII	Z422836G9D
CompTox Dashboard (EPA)	DTXSID70999098
- InChI: InChI=1S/Ce.3HI/h;3*1H/q+3;;;/p-3 Key: ZEDZJUDTPVFRNB-UHFFFAOYSA-K
- SMILES: I[Ce](I)I

Properties
Chemical formula	CeI_{3}
Molar mass	520.829 g·mol^{−1}
Appearance	yellow solid
Melting point	766 °C, 752 °C
Solubility in water	soluble
Solubility in acetone	soluble

Structure
Crystal structure	PuBr_{3}
Coordination geometry	8-coordinate bicapped trigonal prismatic
- Except where otherwise noted, data are given for materials in their standard state (at 25 °C [77 °F], 100 kPa). Infobox references

Cerium(III) iodide (CeI_{3}) is the compound formed by cerium(III) cations and iodide anions.

== Preparation ==
Cerium metal reacts with iodine when heated to form cerium(III) iodide:

2 Ce + 3 I_{2} → 2 CeI_{3}

It is also formed when cerium reacts with mercury(II) iodide at high temperatures:

2 Ce + 3 HgI_{2} → 2 CeI_{3} + 3 Hg

== Structure ==
Cerium(III) iodide adopts the plutonium(III) bromide crystal structure. It contains 8-coordinate bicapped trigonal prismatic Ce^{3+} ions.

== Uses ==
Cerium(III) iodide is used as a pharmaceutical intermediate and as a starting material for organocerium compounds.
