= Uranium tetrabromide =

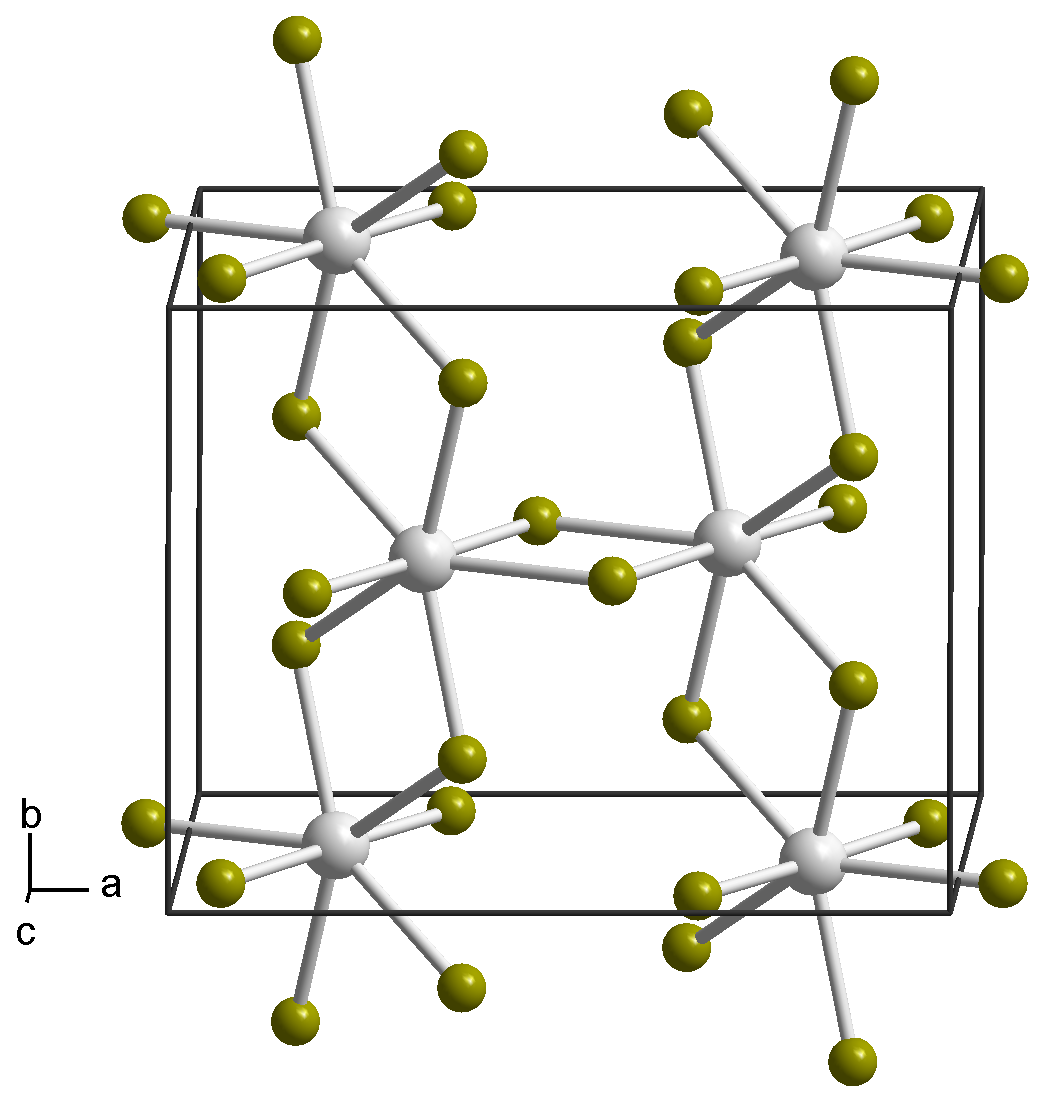

Identifiers
CAS Number	13470-20-7
3D model (JSmol)	Interactive image
ChemSpider	75342
ECHA InfoCard	100.033.380
EC Number	236-734-5
PubChem CID	83507
UNII	L5RKW38SRR
CompTox Dashboard (EPA)	DTXSID4065496
- InChI: InChI=1S/4BrH.U/h4*1H;/q;;;;+4/p-4 Key: IMNIORQANNGBDO-UHFFFAOYSA-J
- SMILES: Br[U](Br)(Br)Br

Properties
Chemical formula	UBr_{4}
Molar mass	557.645 g/mol
Appearance	brown crystalline solid
Density	5190 kg/m^{3}
Melting point	519°C
Boiling point	791°C

Hazards
- GHS labelling
Pictograms	(GHS06: Toxic) (GHS08: Health hazard) (GHS09: Environmental hazard)
Signal word	Danger
Hazard statements	H300, H330, H373, H411
- Except where otherwise noted, data are given for materials in their standard state (at 25 °C [77 °F], 100 kPa). Infobox references

Uranium tetrabromide is an inorganic chemical compound of uranium in oxidation state +4.

== Production ==
Uranium tetrabromide can be produced by reacting uranium and bromine:

U + 2Br_{2} → UBr_{4}

It has also been reported that the compound can be formed through the reaction of uranium dioxide with an excess of carbon tetrabromide, or carbon and bromine, at elevated temperatures:

U_{3}O_{8} + 4C + 6Br_{2} → 3UBr_{4} + 4CO_{2}
