= Uranium pentachloride =

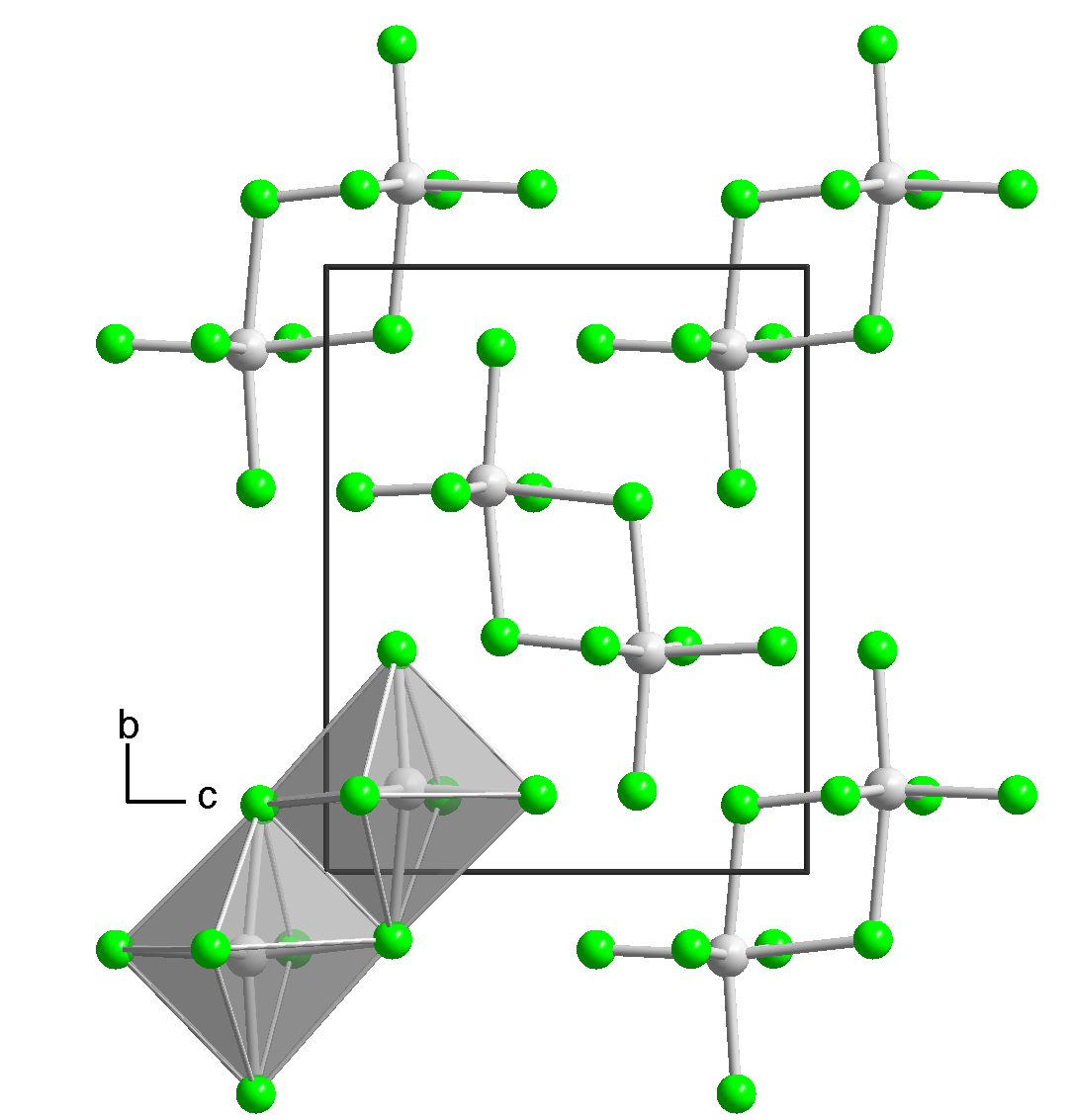

Names
- IUPAC name Uranium(V) chloride
- Other names Uranium pentachloride Uranic chloride

Identifiers
CAS Number	13470-21-8
3D model (JSmol)	Interactive image
ChemSpider	21257712
PubChem CID	24847464 (charge error)
- InChI: InChI=1S/5ClH.U/h5*1H;/q;;;;;+5/p-5 Key: ZRCPKWMJVQCRGF-UHFFFAOYSA-I
- SMILES: [Cl-].[Cl-].[Cl-].[Cl-].[Cl-].[U+5]

Properties
Chemical formula	UCl_{5}
Molar mass	415.29 g/mol
- Except where otherwise noted, data are given for materials in their standard state (at 25 °C [77 °F], 100 kPa). Infobox references

Uranium pentachloride is an inorganic chemical compound composed of uranium in the +5 oxidation state and five chlorine atoms.

== Preparation ==
Uranium pentachloride can be prepared from the reaction of uranium trioxide with carbon tetrachloride, with a previously prepared amount of the compound serving as a catalyst.

4 UO_{3} + 10 CCl_{4} → 4 UCl_{5} + 10 COCl_{2} + O_{2}

It can also be prepared from the reaction between uranium tetrachloride and chlorine in a fluidized bed reactor at 550 °C.

== Properties ==
Uranium pentachloride is available as red-brown microcrystalline powders or black-red crystals with metallic sheen. Unlike the tetrachloride, it is soluble in liquid chlorine. It is very hygroscopic and decomposes into uranium hexachloride and uranium tetrachloride when in water or heated. Additionally, it reacts with some organic solvents such as alcohols, acetone, diethyl ether, or dioxane, but does form stable solutions in carbon tetrachloride, carbon disulfide, and thionyl chloride.

There are two crystalline forms, each of which has the uranium atom in an octahedral geometry among six chlorine atoms. Usually, it is in the α-form, which has a monoclinic crystal structure with space group P2_{1}/n. There is also a triclinic β-form, which has space group P1̅ and consists of U_{2}Cl_{10} dimers like in uranium pentabromide.

The gaseous form has C_{4v} symmetry due to strong f-orbital contribution, and has an electron affinity of 4.76±0.03 eV.
