= Uranium(III) chloride =

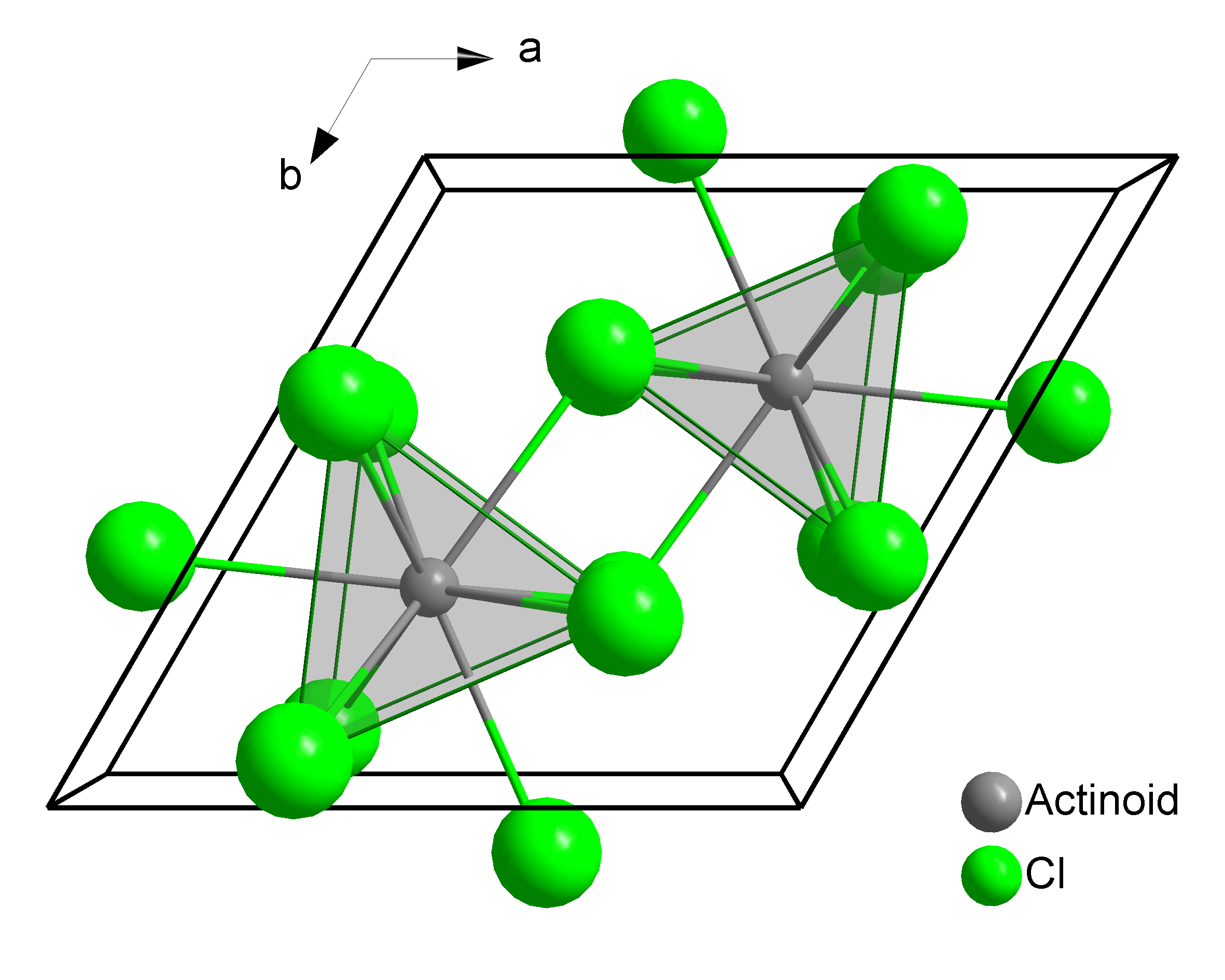

Names
- IUPAC name Uranium(III) chloride
- Other names Uranium chloride Uranium trichloride Hypouranous chloride

Identifiers
CAS Number	10025-93-1
3D model (JSmol)	Interactive image
ChemSpider	146484
PubChem CID	167444
UNII	1SW3X68G1K
CompTox Dashboard (EPA)	DTXSID40894889
- InChI: InChI=1S/3ClH.U/h3*1H;/q;;;+3/p-3 Key: SAWLVFKYPSYVBL-UHFFFAOYSA-K; InChI=1/3ClH.U/h3*1H;/q;;;+3/p-3 Key: SAWLVFKYPSYVBL-DFZHHIFOAG
- SMILES: Cl[U](Cl)Cl

Properties
Chemical formula	UCl_{3}
Appearance	Green crystalline solid
Density	5.500 g/cm^{3}, liquid
Melting point	837 °C (1,539 °F; 1,110 K)
Boiling point	1,657 °C (3,015 °F; 1,930 K)
Solubility in water	Soluble

Structure
Hybridisation	Tricapped trigonal prismatic

Hazards
Flash point	Non-flammable
Autoignition temperature	Non-flammable

Related compounds
Related compounds	Uranium(IV) chloride, Uranium(V) chloride, Uranium(VI) chloride
- Except where otherwise noted, data are given for materials in their standard state (at 25 °C [77 °F], 100 kPa). verify (what is ?) Infobox references

Uranium(III) chloride, UCl_{3}, is a water soluble salt of uranium. UCl_{3} is used mostly to reprocess spent nuclear fuel. Uranium(III) chloride is synthesized in various ways from uranium(IV) chloride; however, UCl_{3} is less stable than UCl_{4}.

== Preparation ==
There are at least two ways to synthesize uranium(III) chloride. The following processes describe how to produce uranium(III) chloride.

(1) In a mixture of NaCl-KCl at 670–710 °C, add uranium tetrachloride with uranium metal.

3UCl_{4} + U → 4UCl_{3}

(2) Heat uranium(IV) chloride in hydrogen gas.

2UCl_{4} + H_{2} → 2UCl_{3} + 2HCl

== Properties ==
In solid uranium(III) chloride each uranium atom has nine chlorine atoms as near neighbours, at approximately the same distance, in a tricapped trigonal prismatic configuration.

Uranium(III) chloride is a green crystalline solid at room temperature. UCl_{3} melts at 837 °C and boils at 1657 °C. Uranium(III) chloride has a density of 5500 kg/m^{3} or 5.500 g/cm^{3}.

Its composition by weight:

Chlorine: 30.84%
Uranium: 69.16%

Its formal oxidative states:

Chlorine: -1
Uranium: +3

This salt is very soluble in water and is also very hygroscopic. UCl_{3} is more stable in a solution of hydrochloric acid.

== Uses ==
=== Reagent ===
Uranium(III) chloride is used in reactions with tetrahydrofuran (THF) and sodium methylcyclopentadiene to prepare various uranium metallocene complexes.

=== Catalyst ===
Uranium(III) chloride is used as a catalyst during reactions between lithium aluminium hydride (LiAlH_{4}) and olefins to produce alkyl aluminate compounds.

=== Molten form ===
Molten uranium(III) chloride is an important component of liquid nuclear fuel used in molten-salt reactors. Neutron scattering and computational studies point to the presence of unusual heterogeneous bonding environment around U(III) at high temperatures, with distinct inner- and outer-coordination subshells. The molten form of uranium(III) chloride is also a typical compound in pyrochemical processes as it is important in the reprocessing of spent nuclear fuels. UCl_{3} is usually the form that uranium takes as spent fuel in electrorefining processes.

== Hydrates ==
There are at least three hydrates of uranium(III) chloride:

1. UCl_{3}^{.}2H_{2}O^{.}2CH_{3}CN
2. UCl_{3}^{.}6H_{2}O
3. UCl_{3}^{.}7H_{2}O

Each are synthesized by the reduction of uranium(IV) chloride in methylcyanide (acetonitrile), with specific amounts of water and propionic acid.

== Precautions ==
While there are no long-term data on the toxic effects thas UCl_{3}, it is important to minimize exposure to this compound when possible.

Similar to other uranium compounds that are soluble in water, UCl_{3} is likely absorbed into the blood through the alveolar pockets of the lungs within days of exposure. Exposure to uranium(III) chloride leads to toxicity of the renal system.
