= Europium(III) hydroxide =

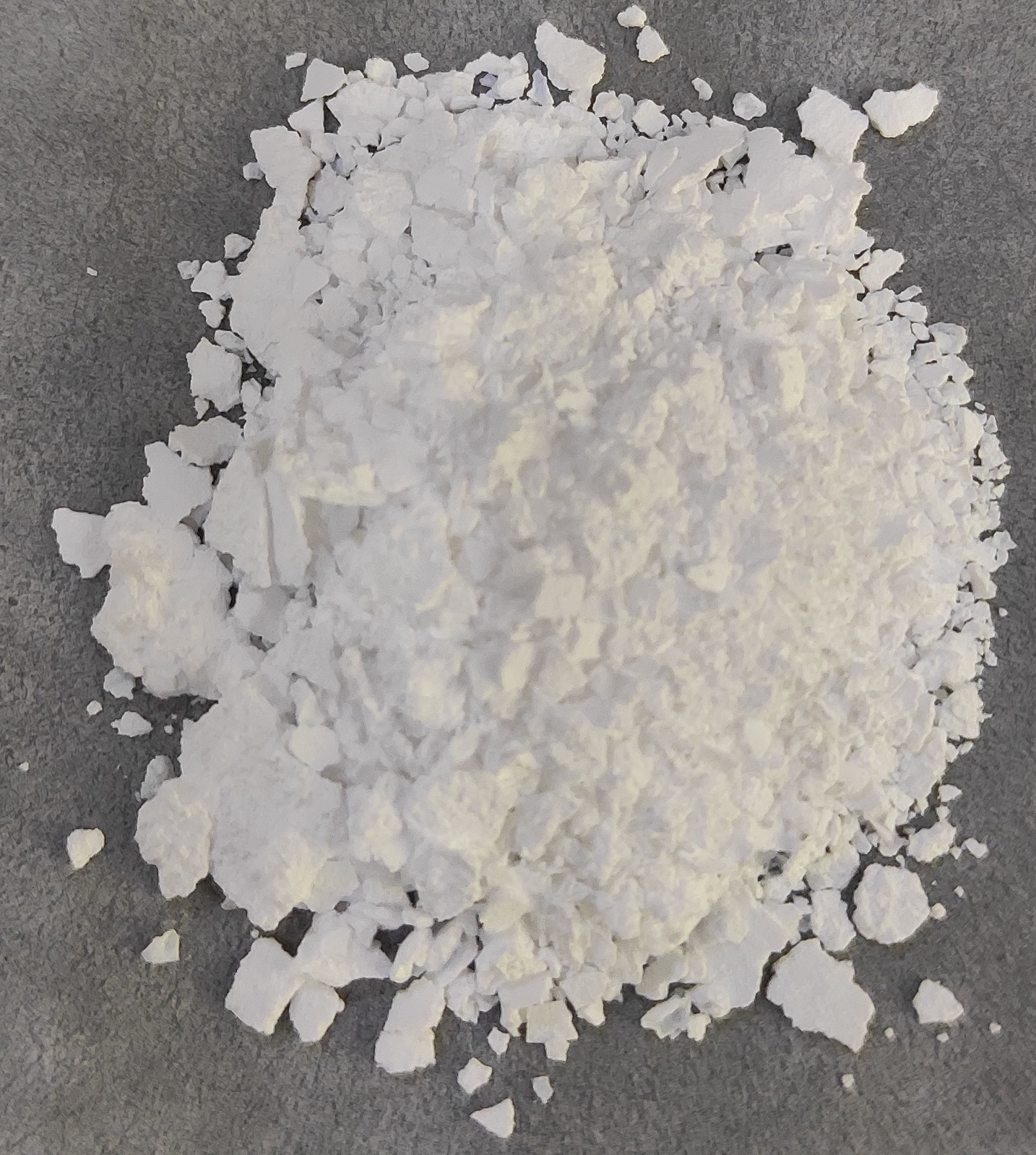

Identifiers
CAS Number	16469-19-5
3D model (JSmol)	Interactive image
ChemSpider	77049
ECHA InfoCard	100.036.818
EC Number	240-517-0
PubChem CID	85435
CompTox Dashboard (EPA)	DTXSID00926913
- InChI: InChI=1S/Eu.3H2O/h;3*1H2/q+3;;;/p-3 Key: CQQZFSZWNXAJQN-UHFFFAOYSA-K
- SMILES: [Eu+3].[OH-].[OH-].[OH-]

Properties
Chemical formula	Eu(OH)_{3}
Molar mass	202.988
Appearance	pale pink solid
Solubility product (K_{sp})	9.38×10^{−27}

Related compounds
Other anions	europium oxide
Other cations	samarium(III) hydroxide gadolinium(III) hydroxide
- Except where otherwise noted, data are given for materials in their standard state (at 25 °C [77 °F], 100 kPa). Infobox references

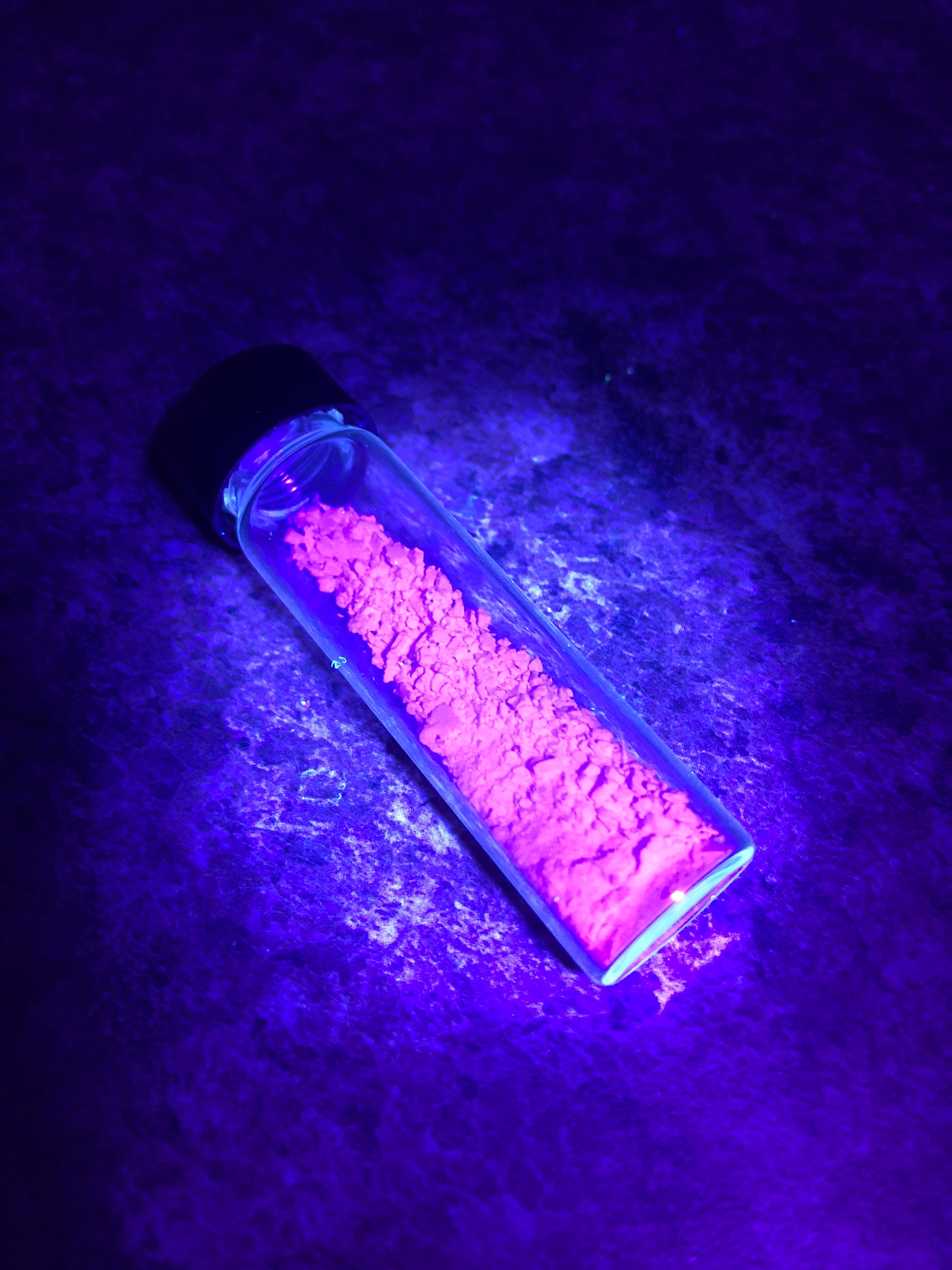
Europium(III) hydroxide under UV light

Europium(III) hydroxide is an inorganic compound with a chemical formula Eu(OH)_{3}.

== Chemical properties ==
Europium(III) hydroxide can be prepared by reacting metallic europium with water. It reacts with acids and produces europium(III) salts:

Eu(OH)_{3} + 3 H^{+} → Eu^{3+} + 3 H_{2}O

Europium(III) hydroxide decomposes to EuO(OH) at elevated temperature. Further decomposition produces Eu_{2}O_{3}.
