= Gadolinium(III) selenate =

Identifiers
CAS Number	20148-56-5
3D model (JSmol)	Interactive image
ChemSpider	15008011
PubChem CID	20432118
- InChI: InChI=1S/2Gd.3H2O4Se/c;;3*1-5(2,3)4/h;;3*(H2,1,2,3,4)/q2*+3;;;/p-6 Key: LSEBDKBNNFPZKP-UHFFFAOYSA-H
- SMILES: [O-][Se](=O)(=O)[O-].[O-][Se](=O)(=O)[O-].[O-][Se](=O)(=O)[O-].[Gd+3].[Gd+3]

Properties
Chemical formula	Gd_{2}(SeO_{4})_{3}
Molar mass	743.395; 887.523 (octahydrate)
Density	3.309g/cm^{3} (octahydrate)
Solubility in water	soluble

Related compounds
Other anions	gadolinium(III) selenite gadolinium(III) sulfate
- Except where otherwise noted, data are given for materials in their standard state (at 25 °C [77 °F], 100 kPa). Infobox references

Gadolinium(III) selenate is an inorganic compound with the chemical formula Gd_{2}(SeO_{4})_{3}. It exists as the anhydrate and octahydrate. The octahydrate transforms into the anhydrate when heated to 130 °C.

== Preparation ==
Gadolinium(III) selenate can be obtained by crystallizing from the reaction of gadolinium oxide and selenic acid solution:

Gd_{2}O_{3} + 3 H_{2}SeO_{4} → Gd_{2}(SeO_{4})_{3} + 3 H_{2}O
