= Gadolinium(III) nitride =

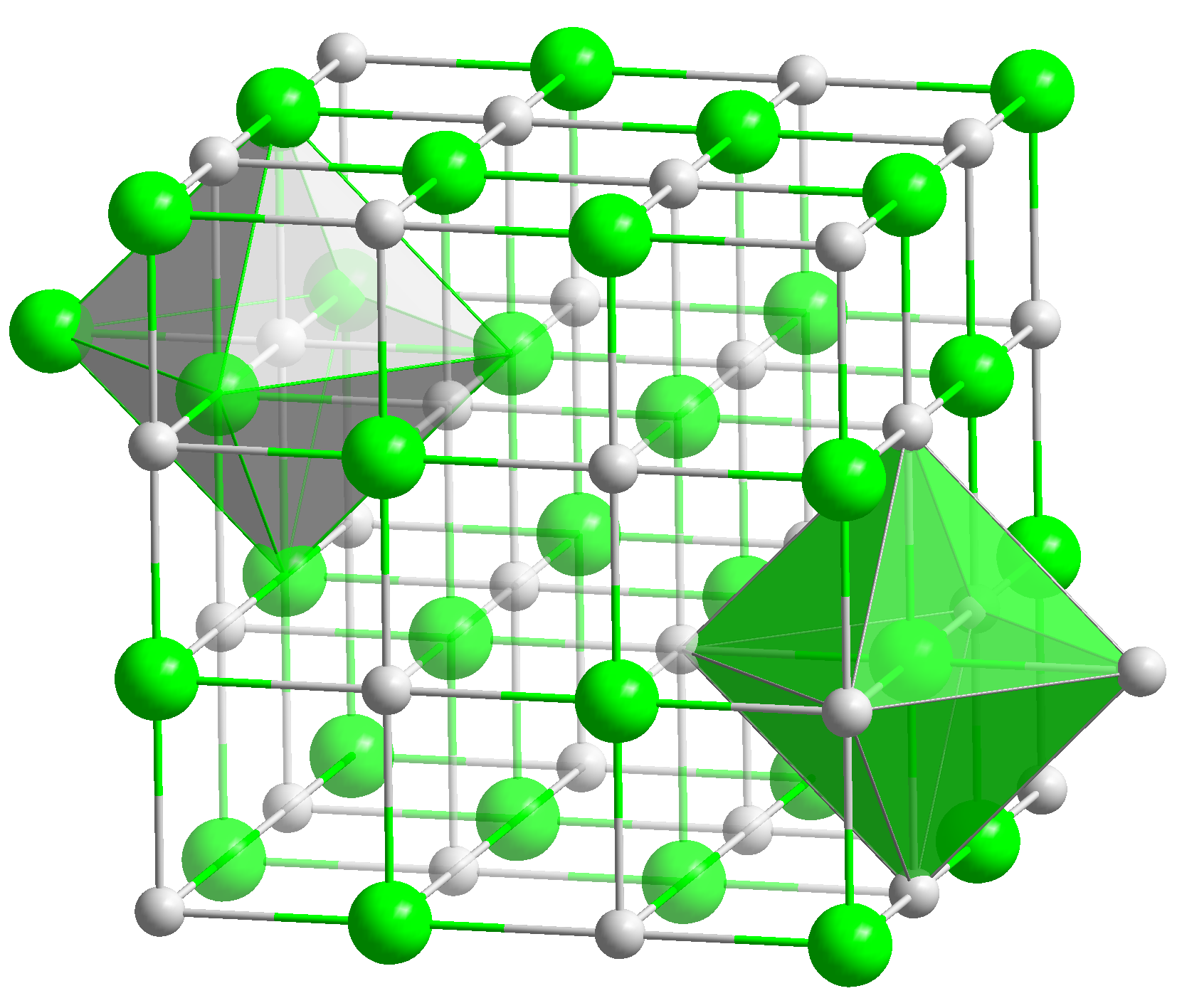

Names
- IUPAC name Azanylidynegadolinium
- Other names Gadolinium mononitride

Identifiers
CAS Number	25764-15-2
3D model (JSmol)	Interactive image
ChemSpider	105120
EC Number	247-250-9
PubChem CID	117632
CompTox Dashboard (EPA)	DTXSID4067145
- InChI: InChI=1S/Gd.N Key: FLATXDRVRRDFBZ-UHFFFAOYSA-N
- SMILES: [Gd]#N

Properties
Chemical formula	GdN
Molar mass	171.26 g·mol^{−1}
Appearance	black powder
Density	9.10 g/cm^{3}
Melting point	2,360 °C (4,280 °F; 2,630 K)

Related compounds
Other anions	Gadolinium phosphide
- Except where otherwise noted, data are given for materials in their standard state (at 25 °C [77 °F], 100 kPa). Infobox references

Gadolinium(III) nitride is a binary inorganic compound of gadolinium and nitrogen with the chemical formula GdN.

== Preparation ==
Gadolinium(III) nitride can be prepared by the direct reaction of gadolinium metal and nitrogen gas at 1600 °C and at a pressure of 1300 atm.

2Gd + N_{2} → 2GdN

== Properties ==
=== Physical ===
Gadolinium(III) nitride forms a black powder. It is isomorphous with sodium chloride with the space group of Fm3̅m.

=== Chemical ===
Gadolinium(III) nitride hydrolyzes in humid air to form gadolinium(III) hydroxide and ammonia. It is insoluble in water but soluble in acids.

== Uses ==
Gadolinium(III) nitride is used as a semiconductor. It can also be used as a magnetic material, a catalyst in chemical reactions and a component in neutron converters for radiation detectors.
