= Gadolinium arsenate =

Names
- Other names Gadolinium(III) arsenate

Identifiers
CAS Number	14214-05-2
3D model (JSmol)	Interactive image
PubChem CID	14818755
- InChI: InChI=1S/AsH3O4.Gd/c2-1(3,4)5;/h(H3,2,3,4,5);/q;+3/p-3 Key: ONFKZRZRPVIVLA-UHFFFAOYSA-K
- SMILES: O=[As]([O-])([O-])[O-].[Gd+3]

Properties
Chemical formula	GdAsO_{4}
Molar mass	296.17 g/mol
Appearance	Colorless crystalline solid
Density	6.082 g/cm^{3} (calculated, 25 °C)
Solubility in water	Sparingly soluble in water

Structure
Crystal structure	Tetragonal, xenotime type
Space group	I4_{1}/amd, No. 141
Lattice constant	a = 0.71326 nm, c = 0.63578 nm
Formula units (Z)	4
- Except where otherwise noted, data are given for materials in their standard state (at 25 °C [77 °F], 100 kPa). Infobox references

Gadolinium arsenate is an inorganic compound of gadolinium and the arsenate ion, with the chemical formula GdAsO_{4}. It is a colorless, sparingly soluble crystalline solid with the tetragonal xenotime structure type. At very low temperature it becomes antiferromagnetic.

== Preparation ==
Gadolinium arsenate can be precipitated from aqueous solutions containing gadolinium(III) and arsenate ions. For example, gadolinium(III) chloride reacts with sodium arsenate:

GdCl_{3} + Na_{3}AsO_{4} → GdAsO_{4}↓ + 3 NaCl

This method has been reported as part of systematic preparations of rare-earth arsenates.

A sample used for standard powder-diffraction measurements was prepared from an aqueous solution of gadolinium trichloride and arsenic pentoxide, followed by heating at 900 °C for 30 minutes.

== Properties ==
=== Crystal structure ===
GdAsO_{4} crystallizes in the tetragonal crystal system, space group I4_{1}/amd (No. 141), with the xenotime or zircon structure type.

At 25 °C, the lattice parameters are a = 7.1326 Å, c = 6.3578 Å with four formula units per unit cell. The corresponding calculated density is 6.082 g/cm^{3}.

The structure consists of isolated AsO^{3−}_{4} tetrahedra and eight-coordinate Gd^{3+} ions. GdAsO_{4} lies within the xenotime-type part of the rare-earth arsenate series.

=== Solubility ===
Gadolinium arsenate is very sparingly soluble in water. A concentration-based solubility-product value of pK_{sp,c} = 21.67 ± 0.04 has been reported.

=== Magnetic properties ===
GdAsO_{4} is a low-temperature Heisenberg antiferromagnet. Magnetic-susceptibility and heat-capacity measurements between 0.3 and 20 K show an antiferromagnetic transition at 1.262 K.

The magnetic behavior is closely related to that of the isostructural compound GdVO_{4}, although the exchange interactions in the arsenate are weaker.

Measurements in applied magnetic fields indicate that GdAsO_{4} does not undergo a single simple spin-flop transition. Instead, several field-induced intermediate magnetic phases occur before the spins reach the high-field saturated state.

=== Vibrational properties ===
Polarized Raman spectroscopy of GdAsO_{4} single crystals shows the expected internal and external vibrational modes of the xenotime-type structure.
