= Gadolinium perchlorate =

Names
- Other names Gadolinium(III) perchlorate

Identifiers
CAS Number	14017-52-8 anhydrous; 15201-56-6 octahydrate
3D model (JSmol)	Interactive image
ChEBI	CHEBI:37289
ChemSpider	20100833
Gmelin Reference	12731
PubChem CID	15335704
- InChI: InChI=1S/3ClHO4.Gd/c3*2-1(3,4)5;/h3*(H,2,3,4,5);/q;;;+3/p-3 Key: HYBHAIGYQVICOT-UHFFFAOYSA-K
- SMILES: [O-]Cl(=O)(=O)=O.[O-]Cl(=O)(=O)=O.[O-]Cl(=O)(=O)=O.[Gd+3]

Properties
Chemical formula	Gd(ClO_{4})_{3}
Molar mass	455.59 g/mol
Appearance	Colorless crystalline solid (hydrates)
Solubility in water	Soluble in water

Structure
Crystal structure	Hexagonal (anhydrous)
Space group	P6_{3}/m, No. 176
Formula units (Z)	2
- Except where otherwise noted, data are given for materials in their standard state (at 25 °C [77 °F], 100 kPa). Infobox references

Gadolinium perchlorate is an inorganic compound of gadolinium and the perchlorate ion, with the chemical formula Gd(ClO_{4})_{3}. It is known in anhydrous form and as several hydrates, including the octahydrate. Anhydrous gadolinium perchlorate belongs to the hexagonal structural family adopted by many rare-earth perchlorates.

== Preparation ==
Hydrated gadolinium perchlorate can be prepared by dissolving gadolinium(III) oxide in concentrated perchloric acid:

Gd_{2}O_{3} + 6 HClO_{4} → 2 Gd(ClO_{4})_{3} + 3 H_{2}O

Aqueous solutions used in modern spectroscopic studies have been prepared by dissolving Gd_{2}O_{3} in 70% perchloric acid.

Anhydrous Gd(ClO_{4})_{3} can be obtained by controlled dehydration of hydrated gadolinium perchlorate.

== Properties ==
=== Anhydrous structure ===
Anhydrous Gd(ClO_{4})_{3} crystallizes in the hexagonal crystal system, space group P6_{3}/m (No. 176), with two formula units per unit cell. It belongs to the isostructural rare-earth perchlorate series extending from La through Er and Y. The Gd^{3+} centres are nine-coordinate, with oxygen atoms from perchlorate groups forming a three-dimensional framework related to the UCl_{3} structure type. The lattice dimensions decrease progressively across the rare-earth series as a consequence of the lanthanide contraction.

=== Hydrates ===
Several hydrated forms of gadolinium perchlorate are known. The octahydrate, Gd(ClO_{4})_{3}·8H_{2}O, is a commonly cited crystalline hydrate. A nonahydrate has also been identified in aqueous phase-equilibrium studies. In the LiClO_{4}–Gd(ClO_{4})_{3}–H_{2}O system, Gd(ClO_{4})_{3}·9H_{2}O occurs as an equilibrium solid phase.

=== Aqueous solution ===
Gd^{3+} is strongly hydrated in aqueous gadolinium perchlorate solutions. Unlike the light rare-earth ions, which predominantly form nona-aqua complexes, and the heavy rare-earth ions, which predominantly form octaaqua complexes, gadolinium lies close to the crossover between these two hydration regimes. Raman spectroscopy of dilute Gd(ClO_{4})_{3} solutions therefore indicates an average first-shell hydration number between eight and nine rather than a single sharply defined coordination number. Perchlorate remains mainly outside the first hydration shell in dilute solutions, while contact ion pairing becomes increasingly important at high perchlorate concentration.

== Coordination chemistry ==
Gadolinium perchlorate is commonly used as a soluble source of Gd^{3+} in coordination chemistry. For example, reaction with myo-inositol, sodium acetate and sodium hydroxide has been used to prepare a giant wheel-shaped cluster containing 140 gadolinium ions. Gadolinium perchlorate hydrates also form solvates with oxygen-donor solvents; a dioxane-containing crystalline adduct of composition Gd(ClO_{4})_{3}·9H_{2}O·4C_{4}H_{8}O_{2} has been reported.

== Safety ==
Gadolinium perchlorate is an oxidizing perchlorate salt and should be kept away from combustible and strongly reducing materials.
