= Gadolinium(III) bromide =

Names
- IUPAC name Gadolinium(III) bromide
- Other names Gadolinium tribromide Gadolinium bromide

Identifiers
CAS Number	13818-75-2
3D model (JSmol)	Interactive image; Interactive image
ChemSpider	75576
ECHA InfoCard	100.034.072
EC Number	237-494-4
PubChem CID	83754
CompTox Dashboard (EPA)	DTXSID9065653
- InChI: InChI=1S/3BrH.Gd/h3*1H;/q;;;+3/p-3 Key: KGOKDPWKDBWITQ-UHFFFAOYSA-K
- SMILES: Br[Gd](Br)Br; [Br-].[Br-].[Br-].[Gd+3]

Properties
Chemical formula	GdBr_{3}
Molar mass	396.96 g·mol^{−1}
Appearance	white crystals
Density	2.844 g/cm^{3}
Melting point	770 °C (1,420 °F; 1,040 K)
Boiling point	1,455 °C (2,651 °F; 1,728 K)
Solubility in water	Soluble
Solubility	Soluble in THF, 1,2-Diethoxyethane, p-dioxane, and alkyl amine

Structure
Crystal structure	monoclinic
Space group	C2/m
Lattice constant	a = 7.224±0.005 Å, b = 12.512±0.005 Å, c = 6.84±0.01 Å

Hazards
- GHS labelling
Pictograms	(GHS07: Exclamation mark)
Signal word	Warning
Hazard statements	H315, H319, H335
Precautionary statements	P261, P305+P351+P338

Related compounds
Other anions	Gadolinium(III) fluoride Gadolinium(III) chloride
- Except where otherwise noted, data are given for materials in their standard state (at 25 °C [77 °F], 100 kPa). Infobox references

Gadolinium(III) bromide is a crystalline compound of gadolinium atoms and bromine atoms. This salt is hygroscopic.

== Preparation ==
Gadolinium(III) bromide can be obtained by the reaction between gadolinium and hydrobromic acid:

2 Gd + 6 HBr → 2 GdBr_{3} + 3 H_{2}

The anhydrous form can be obtained by heating the hydrate with ammonium bromide.
