= Gadonanotube =

Gadonanotube are carbon nanotubes containing superparamagnetic clusters of Gd^{3+} ions. They are linear molecular magnets and efficient contrast agents for magnetic resonance imaging (MRI). The term gadonanotube was introduced in 2005.

== Preparation ==
Owing to their large magnetic moment (μ^{2} = 63μ_{B}^{2}), Gd^{3+} ions are the most popular MRI contrast agents. They are toxic in aqueous solutions, but can be neutralized by chelation or by encapsulating them into carbon nanotubes or fullerenes, resulting in gadonanotubes and gadofullerenes. The as-prepared nanotubes have their ends capped by carbon that hinders their filling. They are cut open by a chemical or/and ultrasonic treatment, and their side walls are chemically modified (functionalized) to impart solubility in water and biological compatibility. Then the nanotubes are sonicated in an aqueous solution of GdCl^{3} to form gadonanotubes, where the Gd^{3+} forms clusters of 2–5 nm diameter which contain up to 10 ions. The small size of the clusters is responsible for the superparamagnetism and superior MRI contrast properties of gadonanotubes. The non-encapsulated Gd is removed by repeated washing with water.

== Properties and applications ==
Gadonanotubes are similar to gadofullerenes in structure and functionality, but they are significantly cheaper and easier to prepare, and have superior magnetic properties. For 20–100 MHz frequencies, their relaxation rate is 3–6 times that of gadofullerenes and about 40 times that of Magnevist, a common commercial MRI contrast agent. This difference is even much larger at lower frequencies. The dispersibility of gadonanotubes in water has also been significantly increased, without the need of a surfactant, by coating the nanotube surface with polyacrylic acid (PAA) polymer. PAA coated gadonanotubes have proven to be good MRI contrast agents when dispersed in water at physiological pH with a relaxivity of 150 mM^{−1} ·s ^{−1} per Gd^{3+} ion at 1.5 T, and have also been used to safely label porcine bone-marrow-derived mesenchymal stem cells for MRI imaging.
