= Gadolinium(III) fluoride =

Names
- IUPAC name Gadolinium(III) fluoride
- Other names Gadolinium trifluoride Gadolinium fluoride

Identifiers
CAS Number	13765-26-9
3D model (JSmol)	Interactive image
ChemSpider	75538
ECHA InfoCard	100.033.958
EC Number	237-369-4
PubChem CID	10176739
CompTox Dashboard (EPA)	DTXSID8065618
- InChI: InChI=1S/3FH.Gd/h3*1H;/q;;;+3/p-3 Key: TYIZUJNEZNBXRS-UHFFFAOYSA-K
- SMILES: F[Gd](F)F

Properties
Chemical formula	GdF_{3}
Appearance	White crystalline powder
Density	7.09 g/cm^{3}
Melting point	1,372 °C (2,502 °F; 1,645 K)
Solubility in water	insoluble

Structure
Crystal structure	orthorhombic
Space group	Pnma

Hazards
- GHS labelling
Pictograms	(GHS07: Exclamation mark)
Signal word	Warning
Hazard statements	H315, H319, H335
NFPA 704 (fire diamond)	1 0 0
Safety data sheet (SDS)	Safety Data Sheet

Related compounds
Other anions	Gadolinium(III) chloride Gadolinium(III) bromide
- Except where otherwise noted, data are given for materials in their standard state (at 25 °C [77 °F], 100 kPa). Infobox references

Gadolinium(III) fluoride is an inorganic compound with a chemical formula GdF_{3}.

== Preparation ==
Gadolinium(III) fluoride can be prepared by heating gadolinium oxide and ammonium bifluoride. The reaction involves two steps:

Gd_{2}O_{3} + 6 NH_{4}HF_{2} → 2 NH_{4}GdF_{4} + 4 NH_{4}F + 3 H_{2}O
NH_{4}GdF_{4} → GdF_{3} + NH_{3} + HF

Alternatively, reacting gadolinium chloride with hydrofluoric acid and adding hot water produces GdF_{3}·xH_{2}O (x=0.53). Anhydrous gadolinium(III) fluoride can then be produced by heating the hydrate with ammonium bifluoride; without the bifluoride, GdOF is formed instead.

GdCl_{3} + 3 HF + x H_{2}O → GdF_{3}·xH_{2}O + 3 HCl

== Uses ==
Gadolinium(III) fluoride is used to produce fluoride glasses.
