= Gadolinium(III) sulfate =

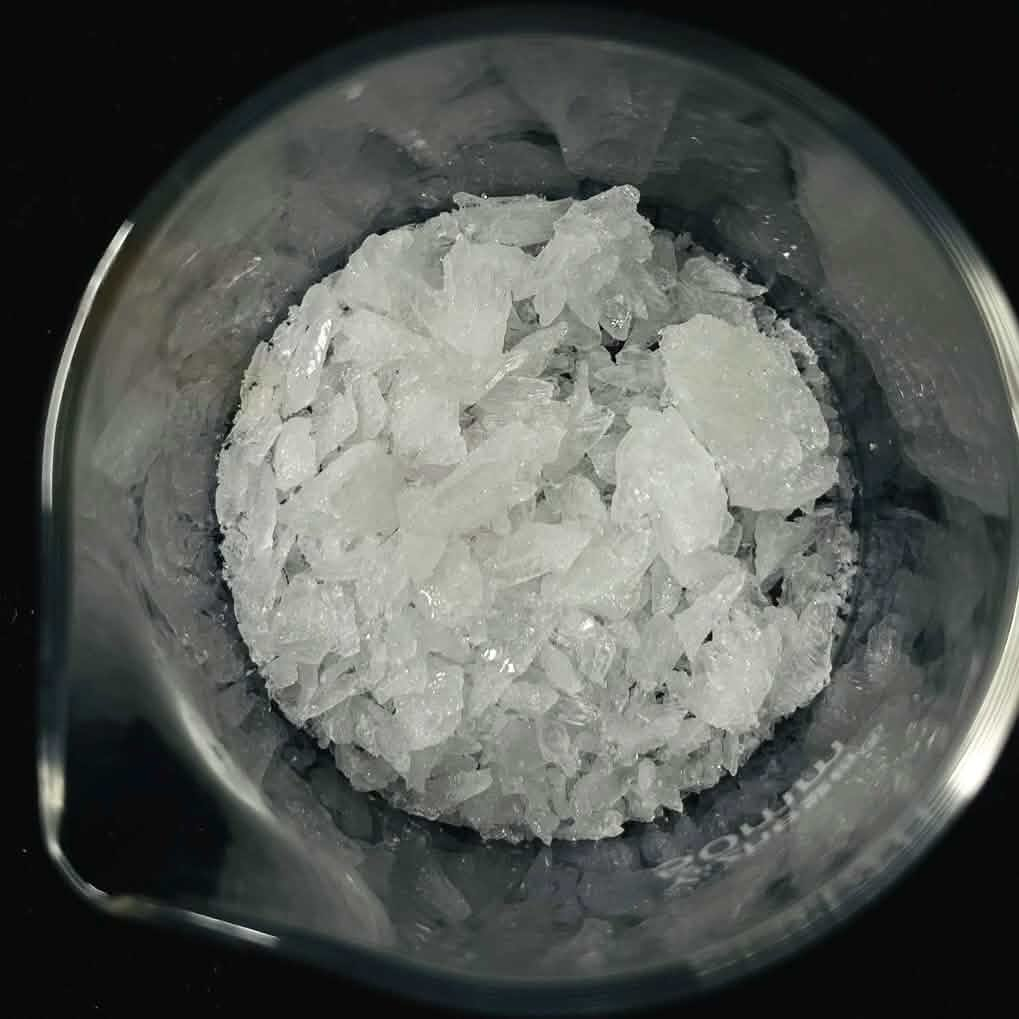
- Octahydrate

Names
- Other names: Digadolinium trisulfate; Gadolinium sulfate; Gadolinium trisulfate

Identifiers
CAS Number	anhydrous: 13628-54-1; octahydrate: 13450-87-8
3D model (JSmol)	anhydrous: Interactive image; octahydrate: Interactive image
ChemSpider	anhydrous: 146004
ECHA InfoCard	100.033.727
EC Number	anhydrous: 237-115-2
PubChem CID	anhydrous: 166873; octahydrate: 16211473
CompTox Dashboard (EPA)	DTXSID90890710
- InChI: anhydrous: InChI=1S/2Gd.3H2O4S/c;;3*1-5(2,3)4/h;;3*(H2,1,2,3,4)/q2*+3;;;/p-6 Key: QLAFITOLRQQGTE-UHFFFAOYSA-H; octahydrate: InChI=1S/2Gd.3H2O4S.8H2O/c;;3*1-5(2,3)4;;;;;;;;/h;;3*(H2,1,2,3,4);8*1H2/q2*+3;;;;;;;;;;;/p-6 Key: JBFCVGZGWFIPNK-UHFFFAOYSA-H
- SMILES: anhydrous: [O-]S(=O)(=O)[O-].[O-]S(=O)(=O)[O-].[O-]S(=O)(=O)[O-].[Gd+3].[Gd+3]; octahydrate: O.O.O.O.O.O.O.O.[O-]S(=O)(=O)[O-].[O-]S(=O)(=O)[O-].[O-]S(=O)(=O)[O-].[Gd+3].[Gd+3]

Properties
Chemical formula	Gd_{2}(SO_{4})_{3}
Molar mass	602.67 g·mol^{−1}
Appearance	colorless solid
Density	4.139 g/cm^{3} (anhydrous); 3.010 g/cm^{3} (octahydrate)
Melting point	400 °C decomposes (octahydrate); 500 °C decomposes (anhydrous)
Solubility in water	anhydrous 3.98 g/mL (0 °C); 2.60 g/mL (20 °C); 2.32 g/mL (40 °C) octahydrate 3.28 g/mL (20 °C); 2.54 g/mL (40 °C)

Structure
Crystal structure	monoclinic (octahydrate)
Space group	C2/c
Lattice constant	a = 13.531 Å, b = 6.739 Å, c = 18.294 Å α = 90°, β = 102.20°, γ = 90°

Hazards
- GHS labelling
Pictograms	(GHS07: Exclamation mark)
Signal word	Warning
Hazard statements	H315, H319, H335
Precautionary statements	P261, P264, P264+P265, P271, P280, P302+P352, P304+P340, P305+P351+P338, P319, P321, P332+P317, P337+P317, P362+P364, P403+P233, P405, P501
- Except where otherwise noted, data are given for materials in their standard state (at 25 °C [77 °F], 100 kPa). Infobox references

Gadolinium(III) sulfate is an inorganic compound with the chemical formula Gd_{2}(SO_{4})_{3}. The octahydrate forms colorless monoclinic crystals.

== Structure and properties ==
The octahydrate forms monoclinic crystals where Gd is coordinated by 4 oxygen atoms of crystal water and 4 oxygens of sulfate giving rise to a distorted square antiprism.

It dehydrates in a two-step mechanism occurring between 130 and 306 °C, forming an amorphous solid. Recrystallization occurs between 380 and 411 °C, forming β-Gd_{2}(SO_{4})_{3}. A monotropic phase transition occurs at about 750 °C, forming α-Gd_{2}(SO_{4})_{3} (space group: C2/c, a = 9.097 Å, b = 14.345 Å, c = 6.234 Å, β = 97.75°). Upon further heating, the oxysulfate (Gd_{2}O_{2}SO_{4}) forms at 900 °C, which decomposes into cubic gadolinium oxide at 1200 °C.

== Preparation ==
The octahydrate can be prepared by treating gadolinium oxide with sulfuric acid.

== Applications ==
Gadolinium sulfate was introduced into the Super-Kamiokande neutrino observatory in order to improve its neutron detection efficiency.

It is used in adiabatic demagnetization to achieve cryogenic temperatures.
