= Gadolinium-doped yttrium aluminium garnet =

Gadolinium yttrium aluminium garnet, usually abbreviated Gd:YAG, is a variation of Nd:YAG with microwave and laser applications.
