= Europium oxide =

Europium oxide is a compound from the two elements europium and oxygen.

Europium oxide may refer to:

- Europium(II) oxide (europium monoxide, EuO) a magnetic semiconductor.
- Europium(III) oxide (europium sesquioxide, Eu_{2}O_{3}), the most common oxide.
