= Gadolinium(III) chloride =

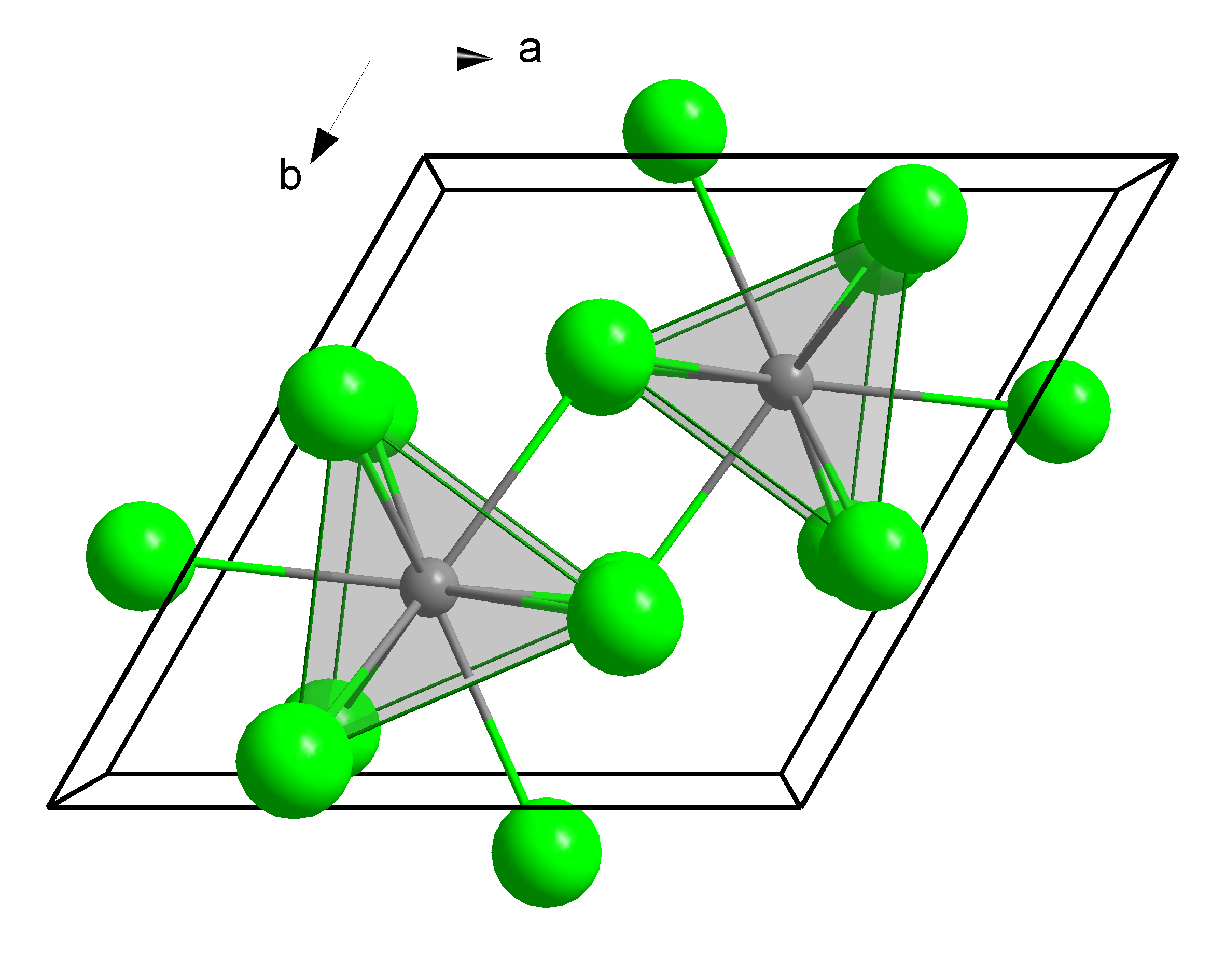

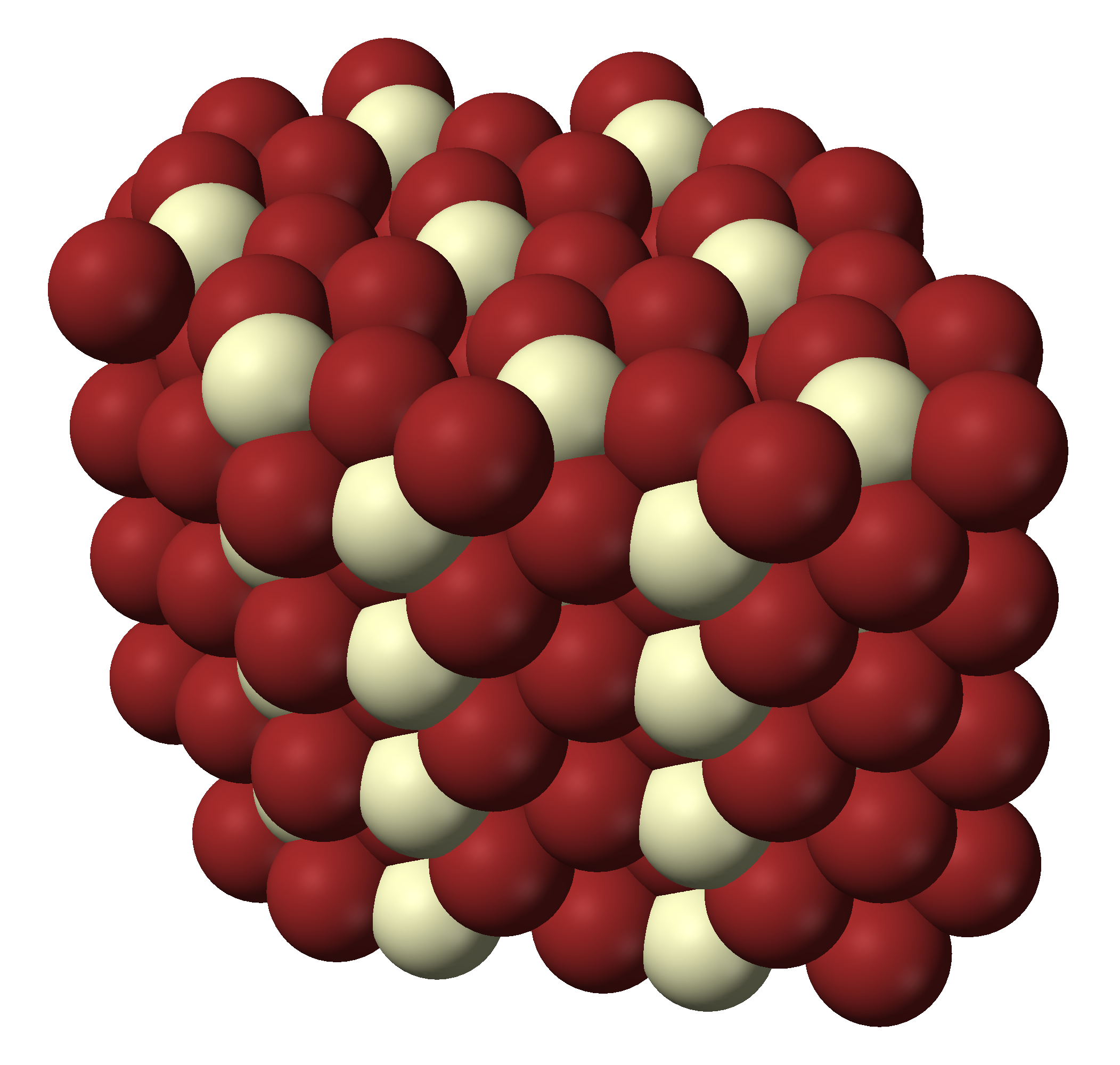

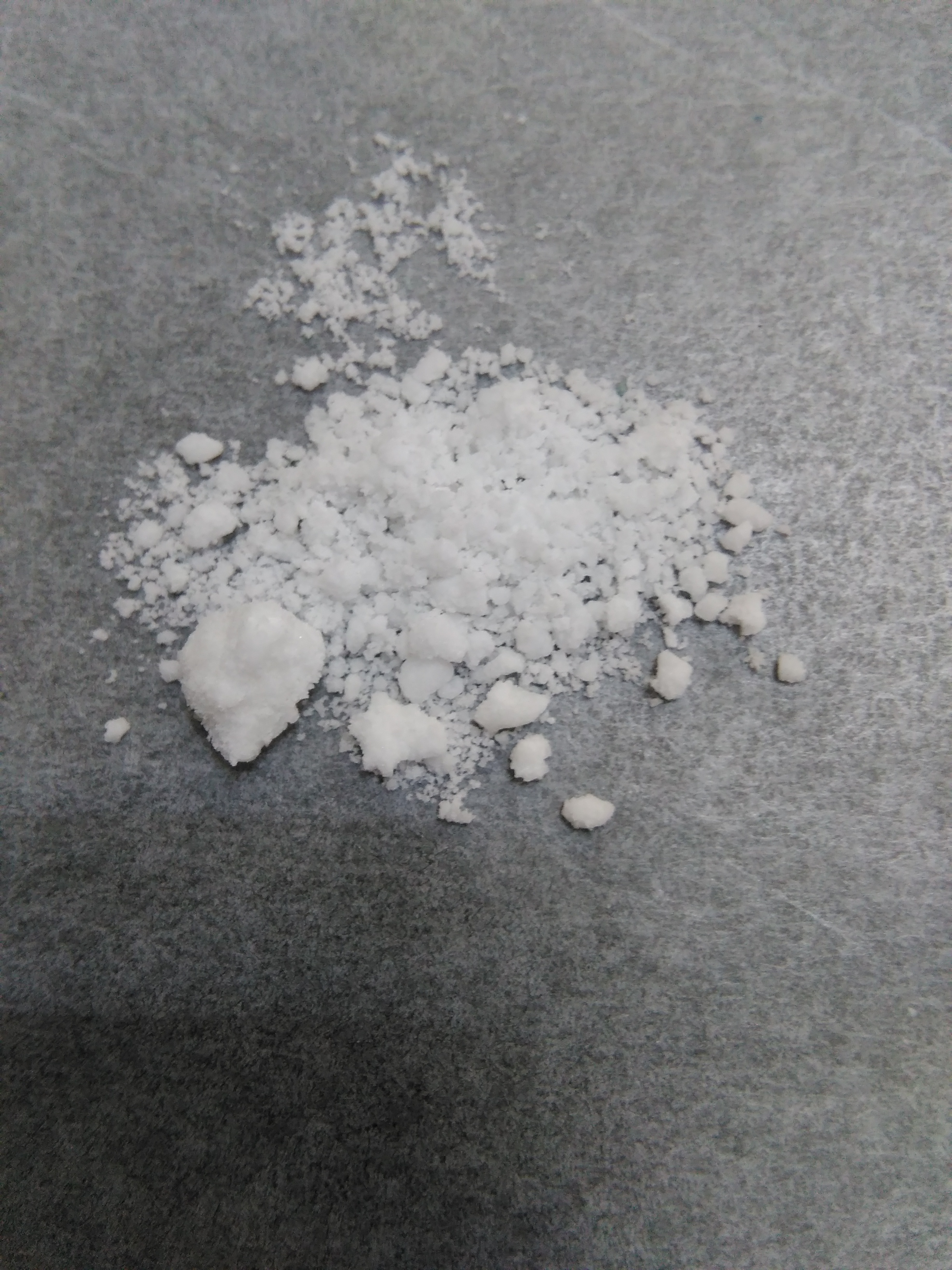

Names
- IUPAC name Gadolinium(III) chloride
- Other names Gadolinium trichloride Gadolinium chloride

Identifiers
| CAS Number | 10138-52-0; 19423-81-5 (hydrate); 13450-84-5 (hexahydrate) |
| 3D model (JSmol) | Interactive image |
| ChEBI | CHEBI:37288 |
| ChEMBL | ChEMBL1697696 |
| ChemSpider | 55406 |
| ECHA InfoCard | 100.030.338 |
| PubChem CID | 61486 |
| UNII | P7082WY76D |
| CompTox Dashboard (EPA) | DTXSID2044761 |
- InChI: InChI=1S/3ClH.Gd/h3*1H;/q;;;+3/p-3 Key: MEANOSLIBWSCIT-UHFFFAOYSA-K; InChI=1/3ClH.Gd/h3*1H;/q;;;+3/p-3 Key: MEANOSLIBWSCIT-DFZHHIFOAP
- SMILES: Cl[Gd](Cl)Cl

Properties
| Chemical formula | GdCl_{3} |
| Molar mass | 263.61 g/mol |
| Appearance | white crystals hygroscopic |
| Density | 4.52 g/cm^{3} |
| Melting point | 609 °C (1,128 °F; 882 K) |
| Boiling point | 1,580 °C (2,880 °F; 1,850 K) |
| Solubility in water | 94.65 g/100mL, 25°C |
| Magnetic susceptibility (χ) | +27,930·10^{−6} cm^{3}/mol |

Structure
| Crystal structure | hexagonal, hP8 |
| Space group | P6_{3}/m, No. 176 |

Related compounds
| Other anions | Gadolinium(III) fluoride Gadolinium(III) bromide Gadolinium(III) oxide |
| Other cations | Europium(III) chloride Terbium(III) chloride |
- Except where otherwise noted, data are given for materials in their standard state (at 25 °C [77 °F], 100 kPa). verify (what is ?) Infobox references

Gadolinium(III) chloride, also known as gadolinium trichloride, is GdCl_{3}. It is a colorless, hygroscopic, water-soluble salt. The hexahydrate GdCl_{3}∙6H_{2}O is commonly encountered and is sometimes also called gadolinium trichloride. Gd^{3+} species are of special interest because the ion has the maximum number of unpaired spins possible, at least for known elements. With seven valence electrons and seven available f-orbitals, all seven electrons are unpaired and symmetrically arranged around the metal. The high magnetism and high symmetry combine to make Gd^{3+} a useful component in NMR spectroscopy and MRI.

== Preparation ==
GdCl_{3} is usually prepared by the "ammonium chloride" route, which involves the initial synthesis of (NH_{4})_{2}[GdCl_{5}]. This material can be prepared from the common starting materials at reaction temperatures of 230 °C from gadolinium oxide:

10 NH_{4}Cl + Gd_{2}O_{3} → 2 (NH_{4})_{2}[GdCl_{5}] + 6 NH_{3} + 3 H_{2}O

from hydrated gadolinium chloride:

4 NH_{4}Cl + 2 GdCl_{3}∙6H_{2}O → 2 (NH_{4})_{2}[GdCl_{5}] + 12 H_{2}O

from gadolinium metal:

10 NH_{4}Cl + 2 Gd → 2 (NH_{4})_{2}[GdCl_{5}] + 6 NH_{3} + 3 H_{2}

In the second step the pentachloride is decomposed at 300 °C:

(NH_{4})_{2}[GdCl_{5}] → GdCl_{3} + 2 NH_{4}Cl

This pyrolysis reaction proceeds via the intermediacy of NH_{4}[Gd_{2}Cl_{7}].

The ammonium chloride route is more popular and less expensive than other methods. GdCl_{3} can, however, also be synthesized by the reaction of solid Gd at 600 °C in a flowing stream of HCl.

Gd + 3 HCl → GdCl_{3} + 3/2 H_{2}

Gadolinium(III) chloride also forms a hexahydrate, GdCl_{3}∙6H_{2}O. The hexahydrate is prepared by gadolinium(III) oxide (or chloride) in concentrated HCl followed by evaporation.

== Structure ==
GdCl_{3} crystallizes with a hexagonal UCl_{3} structure, as seen for other 4f trichlorides including those of La, Ce, Pr, Nd, Pm, Sm, Eu. The following crystallize in theYCl_{3} motif: DyCl_{3}, HoCl_{3}, ErCl_{3}, TmCl_{3}, YdCl_{3}, LuCl_{3}, YCl_{3}). The UCl_{3} motif features 9-coordinate metal with a tricapped trigonal prismatic coordination sphere. In the hexahydrate of gadolinium(III) chloride and other smaller 4f trichlorides and tribromides, six H_{2}O molecules and 2 Cl^{−} ions coordinate to the cations resulting in a coordination group of 8.

== Properties, with applications to MRI ==
Gadolinium salts are of primary interest for relaxation agents in magnetic resonance imaging (MRI). This technique exploits the fact that Gd^{3+} has an electronic configuration of f^{7}. Seven is the largest number of unpaired electron spins possible for an atom, so Gd^{3+} is a key component in the design of highly paramagnetic complexes. To generate the relaxation agents, Gd^{3+} sources such as GdCl_{3}∙6H_{2}O are converted to coordination complexes. GdCl_{3}∙6H_{2}O can not be used as an MRI contrasting agent due to its low solubility in water at the body's near neutral pH. "Free" gadolinium(III), e.g. [GdCl_{2}(H_{2}O)_{6}]^{+}, is toxic, so chelating agents are essential for biomedical applications. Simple monodentate or even bidentate ligands will not suffice because they do not remain bound to Gd^{3+} in solution. Ligands with higher coordination numbers therefore are required. The obvious candidate is EDTA^{4−}, ethylenediaminetetraacetate, which is a commonly employed hexadentate ligand used to complex to transition metals. In lanthanides, however, exhibit coordination numbers greater than six, so still larger aminocarboxylates are employed.

One representative chelating agent is H_{5}DTPA, diethylenetriaminepentaacetic acid. Chelation to the conjugate base of this ligand increases the solubility of the Gd^{3+} at the body's neutral pH and still allows for the paramagnetic effect required for an MRI contrast agent. The DTPA^{5−} ligand binds to Gd through five oxygen atoms of the carboxylates and three nitrogen atoms of the amines. A 9th binding site remains, which is occupied by a water molecule. The rapid exchange of this water ligand with bulk water is a major reason for the signal enhancing properties of the chelate. The structure of [Gd(DTPA)(H_{2}O)]^{2−} is a distorted tricapped trigonal prism.

The following is the reaction for the formation of Gd-DTPA:

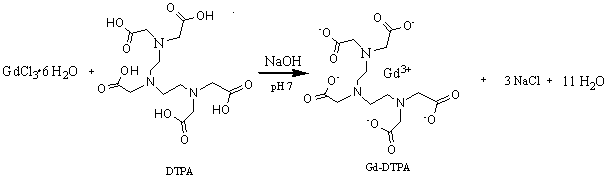
