= Gadolinium =

Gadolinium, _{64}Gd
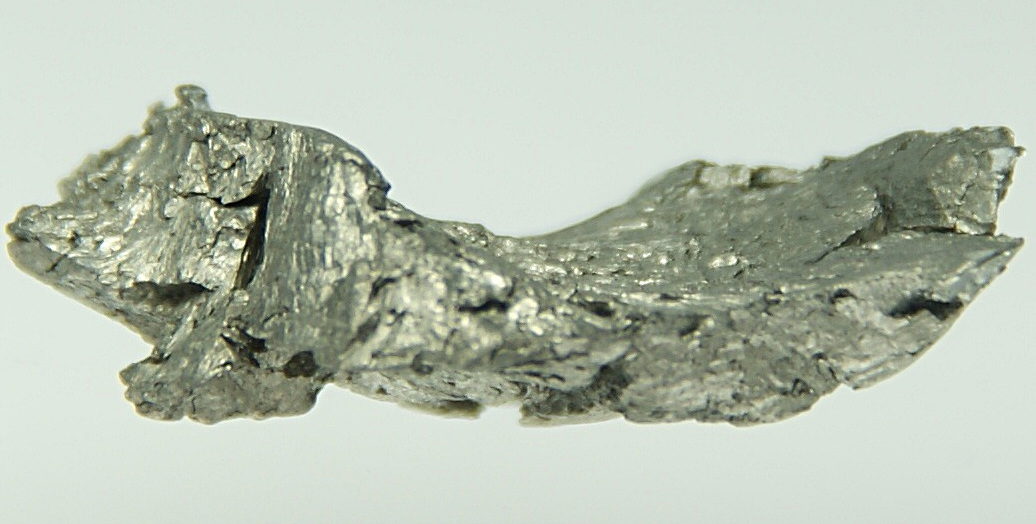

Gadolinium
- Pronunciation: /ˌɡædəˈlɪniəm/ (GAD-ə-LIN-ee-əm)
- Appearance: silvery white

Standard atomic weight A_{r}°(Gd)
- 157.249±0.002; 157.25±0.01 (abridged)

Gadolinium in the periodic table
| Hydrogen | | | | | | | | | | | | | | | | | | | | | | | | | | | | | | | Helium |
| Lithium | Beryllium | | | | | | | | | | | | | | | | | | | | | | | | | Boron | Carbon | Nitrogen | Oxygen | Fluorine | Neon |
| Sodium | Magnesium | | | | | | | | | | | | | | | | | | | | | | | | | Aluminium | Silicon | Phosphorus | Sulfur | Chlorine | Argon |
| Potassium | Calcium | | | | | | | | | | | | | | | Scandium | Titanium | Vanadium | Chromium | Manganese | Iron | Cobalt | Nickel | Copper | Zinc | Gallium | Germanium | Arsenic | Selenium | Bromine | Krypton |
| Rubidium | Strontium | | | | | | | | | | | | | | | Yttrium | Zirconium | Niobium | Molybdenum | Technetium | Ruthenium | Rhodium | Palladium | Silver | Cadmium | Indium | Tin | Antimony | Tellurium | Iodine | Xenon |
| Caesium | Barium | Lanthanum | Cerium | Praseodymium | Neodymium | Promethium | Samarium | Europium | Gadolinium | Terbium | Dysprosium | Holmium | Erbium | Thulium | Ytterbium | Lutetium | Hafnium | Tantalum | Tungsten | Rhenium | Osmium | Iridium | Platinum | Gold | Mercury (element) | Thallium | Lead | Bismuth | Polonium | Astatine | Radon |
| Francium | Radium | Actinium | Thorium | Protactinium | Uranium | Neptunium | Plutonium | Americium | Curium | Berkelium | Californium | Einsteinium | Fermium | Mendelevium | Nobelium | Lawrencium | Rutherfordium | Dubnium | Seaborgium | Bohrium | Hassium | Meitnerium | Darmstadtium | Roentgenium | Copernicium | Nihonium | Flerovium | Moscovium | Livermorium | Tennessine | Oganesson |
–
↑
Gd
↓
Cm
europium ← gadolinium → terbium
- Atomic number (Z): 64
- Group: f-block groups (no number)
- Period: period 6
- Block: f-block
- Electron configuration: [Xe] 4f^{7} 5d^{1} 6s^{2}
- Electrons per shell: 2, 8, 18, 25, 9, 2

Physical properties
- Phase at STP: solid
- Melting point: 1585 K (1312 °C, 2394 °F)
- Boiling point: 3546 K (3273 °C, 5923 °F)
- Density (at 20° C): 7.899 g/cm^{3}
- when liquid (at m.p.): 7.4 g/cm^{3}
- Heat of fusion: 10.05 kJ/mol
- Heat of vaporization: 301.3 kJ/mol
- Molar heat capacity: 37.03 J/(mol·K)
- Specific heat capacity: 235.485 J/(kg·K)
Vapor pressure (calculated)
| P (Pa) | 1 | 10 | 100 | 1 k | 10 k | 100 k |
|---|---|---|---|---|---|---|
| at T (K) | 1836 | 2028 | 2267 | 2573 | 2976 | 3535 |

Atomic properties
- Oxidation states: common: +3; 0, +1, +2
- Electronegativity: Pauling scale: 1.20
- Ionization energies: 1st: 593.4 kJ/mol; 2nd: 1170 kJ/mol; 3rd: 1990 kJ/mol
- Atomic radius: empirical: 180 pm
- Covalent radius: 196±6 pm
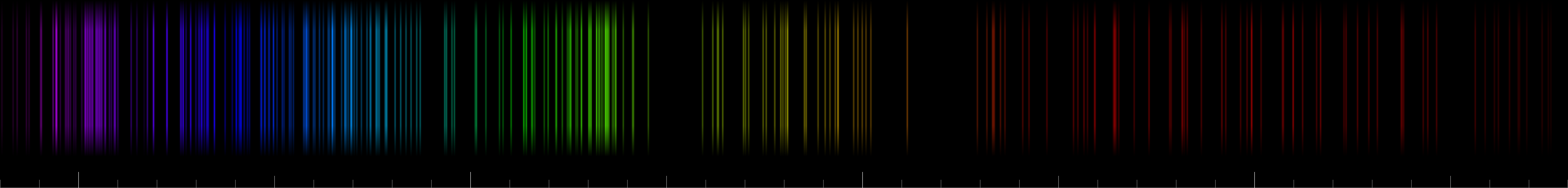
- Spectral lines of gadolinium

Other properties
- Natural occurrence: primordial
- Crystal structure: hexagonal close-packed (hcp) (hP2)
- Lattice constants: a = 363.37 pm c = 578.21 pm (at 20 °C)
- Thermal expansion: −21.4×10^{−6}/K (at 20 °C); 11.1×10^{−6}/K (at 100 °C) (Note: The thermal expansion of a Gd crystal is highly anisotropic and temperature-dependent: the parameters for each crystal axis at 20 °C are: α_{a} = 9.37×10^{−6}/K, α_{c} = −83.0×10^{−6}/K, and α_{average} = α_{V}/3 = −21.4×10^{−6}/K. At 100 °C: α_{a} = 6.6×10^{−6}/K, α_{c} = 20.1×10^{−6}/K, and α_{average} = 11.1×10^{−6}/K.)
- Thermal conductivity: 10.6 W/(m⋅K)
- Electrical resistivity: α, poly: 1.310 µΩ⋅m
- Magnetic ordering: ferromagnetic–paramagnetic transition at 293.4 K
- Molar magnetic susceptibility: +755000.0×10^{−6} cm^{3}/mol (300.6 K)
- Young's modulus: α form: 54.8 GPa
- Shear modulus: α form: 21.8 GPa
- Bulk modulus: α form: 37.9 GPa
- Speed of sound thin rod: 2680 m/s (at 20 °C)
- Poisson ratio: α form: 0.259
- Vickers hardness: 510–950 MPa
- CAS Number: 7440-54-2

History
- Naming: after the mineral gadolinite (itself named after Johan Gadolin)
- Discovery: Jean Charles Galissard de Marignac (1880)
- First isolation: Félix Trombe (1935)

Isotopes of gadolinium
| Main isotopes | | | Decay | |
| Isotope | abundance | half-life (t_{1/2}) | mode | product |
|---|---|---|---|---|
| ^{148}Gd | synth | 86.9 y | α | ^{144}Sm |
| ^{150}Gd | synth | 1.79×10^{6} y | α | ^{146}Sm |
| ^{151}Gd | synth | 123.9 d | ε | ^{151}Eu |
| ^{151}Gd | synth | 123.9 d | α | ^{147}Sm |
| ^{152}Gd | 0.20% | 1.08×10^{14} y | α | ^{148}Sm |
| ^{153}Gd | synth | 240.6 d | ε | ^{153}Eu |
| ^{154}Gd | 2.18% | stable | | |
| ^{155}Gd | 14.80% | stable | | |
| ^{156}Gd | 20.47% | stable | | |
| ^{157}Gd | 15.65% | stable | | |
| ^{158}Gd | 24.84% | stable | | |
| ^{159}Gd | synth | 18.479 h | β^{−} | ^{159}Tb |
| ^{160}Gd | 21.86% | stable | | |

Gadolinium is a chemical element; it has symbol Gd and atomic number 64. It is a silvery-white metal when oxidation is removed. Gadolinium is a ductile and malleable rare-earth element. It reacts with atmospheric oxygen or moisture slowly to form a black oxide coating. Gadolinium below its Curie point of 20 °C (68 °F) is ferromagnetic, with an attraction to a magnetic field higher than that of nickel. Above this temperature it is the most paramagnetic element. It is found in nature only in an oxidized form. When separated, it usually has impurities of the other rare earths because of their similar chemical properties.

Gadolinium was discovered in 1880 by Jean Charles de Marignac, who detected its oxide by using spectroscopy. It is named after the mineral gadolinite, one of the minerals in which gadolinium is found, itself named for the Finnish chemist Johan Gadolin. Pure gadolinium was first isolated by the chemist Félix Trombe in 1935.

Gadolinium possesses unusual metallurgical properties, to the extent that as little as 1% of gadolinium can significantly improve the workability and resistance to oxidation at high temperatures of iron, chromium, and related metals. Gadolinium as a metal or a salt absorbs neutrons and is, therefore, used sometimes for shielding in neutron radiography and in nuclear reactors.

Like most of the rare earths, gadolinium forms trivalent ions with fluorescent properties, and salts of gadolinium(III) are used as phosphors in various applications.

Gadolinium(III) ions in water-soluble salts are highly toxic to mammals. However, chelated gadolinium(III) compounds prevent the gadolinium(III) from being exposed to the organism, and the majority is excreted by healthy kidneys before it can deposit in tissues. Because of its paramagnetic properties, solutions of chelated organic gadolinium complexes are used as intravenously administered gadolinium-based MRI contrast agents in medical magnetic resonance imaging.

The main uses of gadolinium, in addition to use as a contrast agent for MRI scans, are in nuclear reactors, in alloys, as a phosphor in medical imaging, as a gamma ray emitter, in electronic devices, in optical devices, and in superconductors.

== Characteristics ==
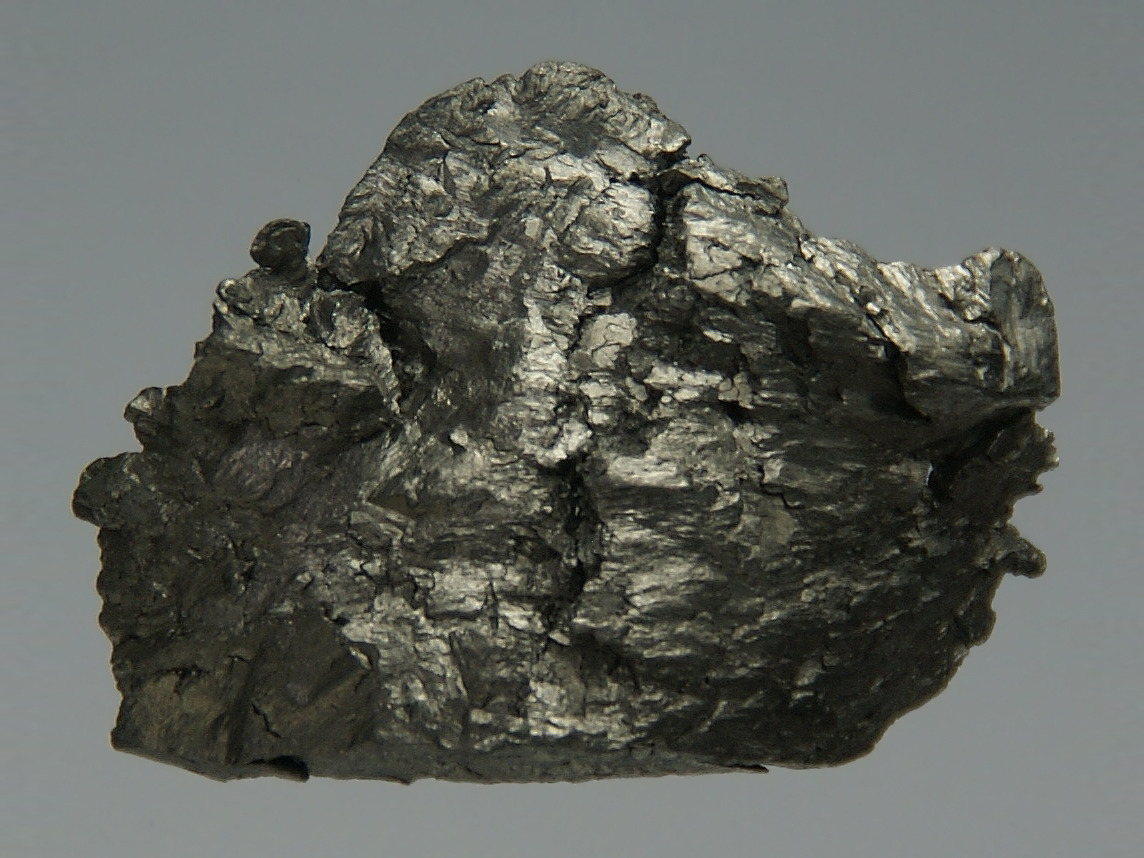
A sample of gadolinium metal

=== Physical properties ===
Gadolinium is the eighth member of the lanthanide series. In the periodic table, it appears between the elements europium to its left and terbium to its right, and above the actinide curium. It is a silvery-white, malleable, ductile rare-earth element. Its 64 electrons are arranged in the configuration of [Xe]4f^{7}5d^{1}6s^{2}, of which the ten 4f, 5d, and 6s electrons are valence.

Like most other metals in the lanthanide series, three electrons are usually available as valence electrons. The remaining 4f electrons are too strongly bound: this is because the 4f orbitals penetrate the most through the inert xenon core of electrons to the nucleus, followed by 5d and 6s, and this increases with higher ionic charge. Gadolinium crystallizes in the hexagonal close-packed α-form at room temperature. At temperatures above 1,235 °C (2,255 °F), it forms or transforms into its β-form, which has a body-centered cubic structure.

The isotope gadolinium-157 has the highest thermal-neutron capture cross-section among any stable nuclide: about 259,000 barns. Only xenon-135 has a higher capture cross-section, about 2.0 million barns, but is radioactive.

Gadolinium is believed to be ferromagnetic at temperatures below 20 °C (68 °F) and is strongly paramagnetic above this temperature. In fact, at body temperature, gadolinium exhibits the greatest paramagnetic effect of any element. There is evidence that gadolinium is a helical antiferromagnetic, rather than a ferromagnetic, below 20 °C (68 °F). Gadolinium demonstrates a magnetocaloric effect whereby its temperature increases when it enters a magnetic field and decreases when it leaves the magnetic field. A significant magnetocaloric effect is observed at higher temperatures, up to about 300 K (27 °C), in the compound Gd_{5}(Si_{1−x}Ge_{x})_{4}.

Individual gadolinium atoms can be isolated by encapsulating them into fullerene molecules, where they can be visualized with a transmission electron microscope. Individual Gd atoms and small Gd clusters can be incorporated into carbon nanotubes.

=== Chemical properties ===
Gadolinium combines with most elements to form Gd(III) derivatives. It also combines with nitrogen, carbon, sulfur, phosphorus, boron, selenium, silicon, and arsenic at elevated temperatures, forming binary compounds.

Unlike the other rare-earth elements, metallic gadolinium is relatively stable in dry air. However, it tarnishes quickly in moist air, forming a loosely-adhering gadolinium(III) oxide (Gd_{2}O_{3}):

4 Gd + 3 O_{2} → 2 Gd_{2}O_{3},

which spalls off, exposing more surface to oxidation.

Gadolinium is a strong reducing agent, which reduces oxides of several metals into their elements. Gadolinium is quite electropositive and reacts slowly with cold water and quite quickly with hot water to form gadolinium(III) hydroxide (Gd(OH)_{3}):

2 Gd + 6 H_{2}O → 2 Gd(OH)_{3} + 3 H_{2}.

Gadolinium metal is attacked readily by dilute sulfuric acid to form solutions containing the colorless Gd(III) ions, which exist as [Gd(H_{2}O)_{9}]^{3+} complexes:

2 Gd + 3 H_{2}SO_{4} + 18 H_{2}O → 2 [Gd(H_{2}O)_{9}]^{3+} + 3 SO_{4}^{2−} + 3 H_{2}.

==== Chemical compounds ====
In the great majority of its compounds, like many rare-earth metals, gadolinium adopts the oxidation state +3. However, gadolinium can be found on rare occasions in the 0, +1 and +2 oxidation states. All four trihalides are known. All are white, except for the iodide, which is yellow. Most commonly encountered of the halides is gadolinium(III) chloride (GdCl_{3}). The oxide dissolves in acids to give the salts, such as gadolinium(III) nitrate and gadolinium(III) sulfate.

Gadolinium(III), like most lanthanide ions, forms complexes with high coordination numbers. This tendency is illustrated by the use of the chelating agent DOTA, an octadentate ligand. Salts of [Gd(DOTA)]^{−} are useful in magnetic resonance imaging. A variety of related chelate complexes have been developed, including gadodiamide.

Reduced gadolinium compounds are known, especially in the solid state. Gadolinium(II) halides are obtained by heating Gd(III) halides in presence of metallic Gd in tantalum containers. Gadolinium also forms the sesquichloride Gd_{2}Cl_{3}, which can be further reduced to GdCl by annealing at 800 °C (1,470 °F). This gadolinium(I) chloride forms platelets with layered graphite-like structure.

=== Isotopes ===
Naturally occurring gadolinium is composed of the element's six stable isotopes - ^{154}Gd, ^{155}Gd, ^{156}Gd, ^{157}Gd, ^{158}Gd, and ^{160}Gd - as well as the primordial radionuclide ^{152}Gd, which has an extremely long half-life of 1.08×10^{14} years. Out of these isotopes, ^{158}Gd has the highest natural abundance at 24.8%.

Gadolinium has 35 known radioisotopes, ranging in mass number from 133 to 173. The three most stable of these all undergo alpha decay into isotopes of samarium: ^{152}Gd (t_{½} = 1.08×10^{14} years), ^{150}Gd (t_{½} = 1.79×10^{6} years), and ^{148}Gd (t_{½} = 86.9 years). All remaining radioisotopes have half-lives less than a year, and the majority have half-lives less than two minutes. Radioisotopes of gadolinium with mass numbers at or below 147 primarily decay via electron capture into isotopes of europium, while those with mass numbers at or above 161 primarily decay via beta minus decay into isotopes of terbium. Gadolinium also has fourteen known metastable isomers, with the three most stable being ^{143m}Gd (t_{½} = 110 seconds), ^{145m}Gd (t_{½} = 85 seconds), and ^{141m}Gd (t_{½} = 24.5 seconds).

^{154}Gd, ^{155}Gd, and ^{160}Gd are observationally stable, meaning that they are predicted to decay, but their decay has never been observed. ^{154}Gd and ^{155}Gd are expected to alpha decay into ^{150}Sm and ^{151}Sm respectively, while ^{160}Gd is expected to double beta decay into ^{160}Dy. An experimental lower bound for the half-life of ^{160}Gd has been measured to be 1.3×10^{21} years.

== History ==
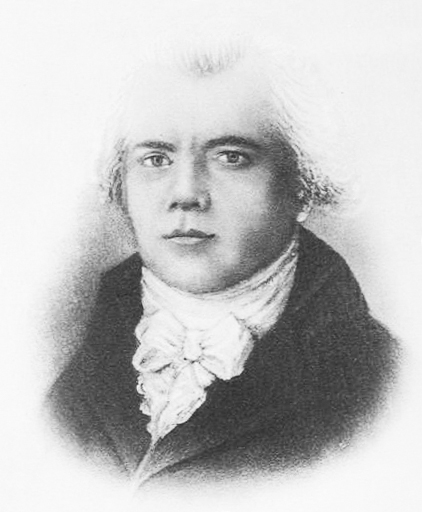
Johan Gadolin is the namesake of gadolinite, the mineral that gadolinium is named after

In 1794, the Finnish chemist and mineralogist Johan Gadolin became the first to chemically analyze the mineral now known as gadolinite, which was named after him by the German chemist Martin Klaproth in 1802. In 1880, the Swiss chemist Jean Charles Galissard de Marignac observed the spectroscopic lines of a then-unknown element, gadolinium, in samples of gadolinite (which actually contains relatively little gadolinium, but enough to show a spectrum) and the separate mineral cerite, which proved to contain far more of the new element. De Marignac eventually separated a mineral oxide from cerite, which he realized was the oxide of the element. He designated the element with the provisional symbol Yα. The French chemist Paul-Émile Lecoq de Boisbaudran named the element "gadolinium" after gadolinite in 1886. Pure gadolinium metal was isolated for the first time in 1935 by Félix Trombe.

== Occurrence ==
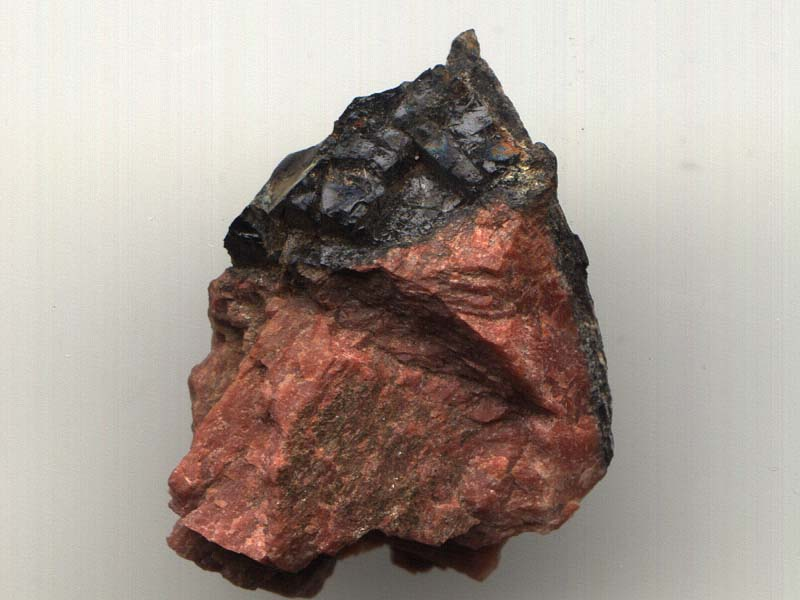
Gadolinite

Gadolinium is a constituent in many minerals, such as monazite and bastnäsite. The metal is too reactive to exist naturally. Paradoxically, as noted above, the mineral gadolinite actually contains only traces of this element. The abundance in the Earth's crust is about 6.2 mg/kg. The main mining areas are in China, the US, Brazil, Sri Lanka, India, and Australia with reserves expected to exceed one million tonnes. World production of pure gadolinium is about 400 tonnes per year. The only known mineral with essential gadolinium, lepersonnite-(Gd), is very rare.

== Production ==
Gadolinium is produced both from monazite and bastnäsite.

1. Crushed minerals are extracted with hydrochloric acid or sulfuric acid, which converts the insoluble oxides into soluble chlorides or sulfates.
2. The acidic filtrates are partially neutralized with caustic soda to pH 3–4. Thorium precipitates as its hydroxide, and is then removed.
3. The remaining solution is treated with ammonium oxalate to convert rare earths into their insoluble oxalates. The oxalates are converted to oxides by heating.
4. The oxides are dissolved in nitric acid that excludes one of the main components, cerium, whose oxide is insoluble in HNO_{3}.
5. The solution is treated with magnesium nitrate to produce a crystallized mixture of double salts of gadolinium, samarium and europium.
6. The salts are separated by ion exchange chromatography.
7. The rare-earth ions are then selectively washed out by a suitable complexing agent.

Gadolinium metal is obtained from its oxide or salts by heating it with calcium at 1,450 °C (2,640 °F) in an argon atmosphere. Sponge gadolinium can be produced by reducing molten GdCl_{3} with an appropriate metal at temperatures below 1,312 °C (2,394 °F) (the melting point of Gd) at reduced pressure.

== Applications ==
Gadolinium has no large-scale applications, but it has a variety of specialized uses.

=== Neutron absorber ===
Because gadolinium has a high neutron cross-section, it is effective for use with neutron radiography and in shielding of nuclear reactors. It is used as a secondary, emergency shut-down measure in some nuclear reactors, particularly of the CANDU reactor type. Gadolinium is used in nuclear marine propulsion systems as a burnable poison. The use of gadolinium in neutron capture therapy to target tumors has been investigated, and gadolinium-containing compounds have proven promising.

=== Alloys ===
Gadolinium possesses unusual metallurgic properties, with as little as 1% of gadolinium improving the workability of iron, chromium, and related alloys, and their resistance to high temperatures and oxidation.

=== Magnetic contrast agent ===
Paramagnetic ions, such as gadolinium, increase nuclear spin relaxation rates, making gadolinium useful as a contrast agent for magnetic resonance imaging (MRI). Solutions of organic gadolinium complexes and gadolinium compounds are used as intravenous contrast agents to enhance images in medical and magnetic resonance angiography (MRA) procedures. Magnevist is the most widespread example. Nanotubes packed with gadolinium, called "gadonanotubes", are 40 times more effective than the usual gadolinium contrast agent. Traditional gadolinium-based contrast agents are un-targeted, generally distributing throughout the body after injection, but will not readily cross the intact blood–brain barrier. Brain tumors, and other disorders that degrade the blood–brain barrier, allow these agents to penetrate into the brain and facilitate their detection by contrast-enhanced MRI. Similarly, delayed gadolinium-enhanced magnetic resonance imaging of cartilage uses an ionic compound agent, originally Magnevist, that is excluded from healthy cartilage based on electrostatic repulsion but will enter proteoglycan-depleted cartilage in diseases such as osteoarthritis.

=== Phosphors ===
Gadolinium is used as a phosphor in medical imaging. It is contained in the phosphor layer of X-ray detectors, suspended in a polymer matrix. Terbium-doped gadolinium oxysulfide (Gd_{2}O_{2}S:Tb) at the phosphor layer converts the X-rays released from the source into light. This material emits green light at 540 nm because of the presence of Tb^{3+}, which is very useful for enhancing the imaging quality. The energy conversion of Gd is up to 20%, which means that one fifth of the X-ray energy striking the phosphor layer can be converted into visible photons. Gadolinium oxyorthosilicate (Gd_{2}SiO_{5}, GSO; usually doped by 0.1–1.0% of Ce) is a single crystal that is used as a scintillator in medical imaging such as positron emission tomography, and for detecting neutrons.

Gadolinium compounds were also used for making green phosphors for color TV tubes.

=== Gamma ray emitter ===
Gadolinium-153 is produced in a nuclear reactor from elemental europium or enriched gadolinium targets. It has a half-life of 240±10 days and emits gamma radiation with strong peaks at 41 keV and 102 keV. It is used in many quality-assurance applications, such as line sources and calibration phantoms, to ensure that nuclear-medicine imaging systems operate correctly and produce useful images of radioisotope distribution inside the patient. It is also used as a gamma-ray source in X-ray absorption measurements and in bone density gauges for osteoporosis screening.

=== Electronic and optical devices ===
Gadolinium is used for making gadolinium yttrium garnet (Gd:Y_{3}Al_{5}O_{12}), which has microwave applications and is used in fabrication of various optical components and as substrate material for magneto-optical films.

=== Electrolyte in fuel cells ===
Gadolinium can also serve as an electrolyte in solid oxide fuel cells (SOFCs). Using gadolinium as a dopant for materials like cerium oxide (in the form of gadolinium-doped ceria) gives an electrolyte having both high ionic conductivity and low operating temperatures.

=== Magnetic refrigeration via magnetocalorics ===
Gadolinium is the standard reference material in the study of magnetic refrigeration near room temperature. Pure Gd itself exhibits a large magnetocaloric effect near its Curie temperature of 20 °C (68 °F), and this has sparked interest into producing Gd alloys having a larger effect and tunable Curie temperature. In Gd_{5}(Si_{x}Ge_{1−x})_{4}, Si and Ge compositions can be varied to adjust the Curie temperature. Gadolinium-based materials, such as Gd_{5}(Si_{x}Ge_{1−x})_{4}, are currently the most promising materials, owing to their high Curie temperature and giant magneto-caloric effect. Magnetic refrigeration could provide significant efficiency and environmental advantages over conventional refrigeration methods.

=== Superconductors ===
Gadolinium barium copper oxide (GdBCO) is a superconductor with applications in superconducting motors or generators such as in wind turbines. It can be manufactured in the same way as the most widely researched cuprate high temperature superconductor, yttrium barium copper oxide (YBCO) and uses an analogous chemical composition (GdBa_{2}Cu_{3}O_{7−δ}). It was used in 2014 to set a new world record for the highest trapped magnetic field in a bulk high temperature superconductor, with a field of 17.6T being trapped within two GdBCO bulks.

=== Asthma treatment ===
Gadolinium is being investigated as a possible treatment for preventing lung tissue scarring in asthma. A positive effect has been observed in mice.

=== Niche and former applications ===
Gadolinium is used for antineutrino detection in the Japanese Super-Kamiokande detector in order to sense supernova explosions. Low-energy neutrons that arise from antineutrino absorption by protons in the detector's ultrapure water are captured by gadolinium nuclei, which subsequently emit gamma rays that are detected as part of the antineutrino signature.

Gadolinium gallium garnet (GGG, Gd_{3}Ga_{5}O_{12}) was used for imitation diamonds and for computer bubble memory.

== Safety ==
Gadolinium
Hazards
- GHS labelling
| Pictograms | (GHS02: Flammable) |
| Signal word | Danger |
| Hazard statements | H261 |
| Precautionary statements | P231+P232, P422 |
| NFPA 704 (fire diamond) | 0 0 1 W |

As a free ion, gadolinium is reported often to be highly toxic, but MRI contrast agents are chelated compounds and are considered safe enough to be used in most persons. The toxicity of free gadolinium ions in animals is due to interference with a number of calcium-ion channel dependent processes. The 50% lethal dose is about 0.34 mmol/kg (IV, mouse) or 100–200 mg/kg. Toxicity studies in rodents show that chelation of gadolinium (which also improves its solubility) decreases its toxicity with regard to the free ion by a factor of 31 (i.e., the lethal dose for the Gd-chelate increases by 31 times). It is believed therefore that clinical toxicity of gadolinium-based contrast agents (GBCAs) in humans will depend on the strength of the chelating agent; however this research is still not complete. About a dozen different Gd-chelated agents have been approved as MRI contrast agents around the world.

Use of gadolinium-based contrast agents results in deposition of gadolinium in tissues of the brain, bone, skin, and other tissues in amounts that depend on kidney function, structure of the chelates (linear or macrocyclic) and the dose administered. In patients with kidney failure, there is a risk of a rare but serious illness called nephrogenic systemic fibrosis (NSF) that is caused by the use of gadolinium-based contrast agents. The disease resembles scleromyxedema and to some extent scleroderma. It may occur months after a contrast agent has been injected. Its association with gadolinium and not the carrier molecule is confirmed by its occurrence with various contrast materials in which gadolinium is carried by very different carrier molecules. Because of the risk of NSF, use of these agents is not recommended for any individual with end-stage kidney failure as they may require emergent dialysis.

Included in the current guidelines from the Canadian Association of Radiologists are that dialysis patients should receive gadolinium agents only where essential and that they should receive dialysis after the exam. If a contrast-enhanced MRI must be performed on a dialysis patient, it is recommended that certain high-risk contrast agents be avoided but not that a lower dose be considered. The American College of Radiology recommends that contrast-enhanced MRI examinations be performed as closely before dialysis as possible as a precautionary measure, although this has not been proven to reduce the likelihood of developing NSF. The FDA recommends that potential for gadolinium retention be considered when choosing the type of GBCA used in patients requiring multiple lifetime doses, pregnant women, children, and patients with inflammatory conditions.

Anaphylactoid reactions are rare, occurring in approximately 0.03–0.1%.

Long-term environmental impacts of gadolinium contamination due to human usage are a topic of ongoing research.

== Biological use ==
Gadolinium has no known native biological role, but its compounds are used as research tools in biomedicine. Gd^{3+} compounds are components of MRI contrast agents. It is used in various ion channel electrophysiology experiments to block sodium leak channels and stretch activated ion channels. Gadolinium has recently been used to measure the distance between two points in a protein via electron paramagnetic resonance, something that gadolinium is especially amenable to thanks to EPR sensitivity at w-band (95 GHz) frequencies.
