= Gadolinium(III) oxide =

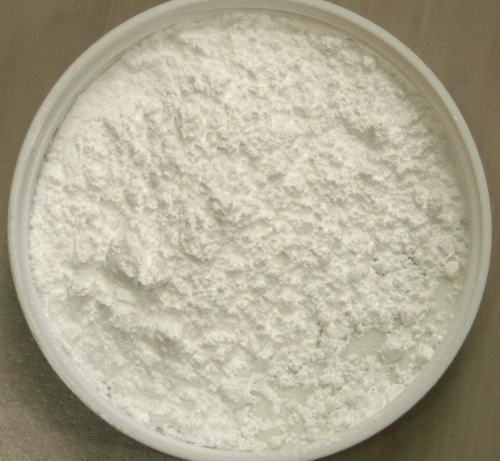
- Gadolinium(III) oxide

Names
- Other names gadolinium sesquioxide, gadolinium trioxide

Identifiers
| CAS Number | 12064-62-9 |
| 3D model (JSmol) | Interactive image |
| ChemSpider | 140201 |
| ECHA InfoCard | 100.031.861 |
| EC Number | 235-060-9 |
| PubChem CID | 159427 |
| RTECS number | LW4790000 |
| UNII | 5480D0NHLJ |
| CompTox Dashboard (EPA) | DTXSID4051613 DTXSID00912093, DTXSID4051613 |
- InChI: InChI=1S/2Gd.3O/q2*+3;3*-2 Key: CMIHHWBVHJVIGI-UHFFFAOYSA-N; InChI=1/2Gd.3O/q2*+3;3*-2 Key: CMIHHWBVHJVIGI-UHFFFAOYAI
- SMILES: O=[Gd]O[Gd]=O

Properties
| Chemical formula | Gd_{2}O_{3} |
| Molar mass | 362.50 g/mol |
| Appearance | white odorless powder |
| Density | 7.07 g/cm^{3} |
| Melting point | 2,420 °C (4,390 °F; 2,690 K) |
| Solubility in water | insoluble |
| Solubility product (K_{sp}) | 1.8×10^{−23} |
| Solubility | soluble in acid |
| Magnetic susceptibility (χ) | +53,200·10^{−6} cm^{3}/mol |

Structure
| Crystal structure | cubic, cI80, Monoclinic |
| Space group | Ia-3, No. 206, C2/m, No. 12 |

Hazards
- GHS labelling
| Pictograms | (GHS07: Exclamation mark) (GHS09: Environmental hazard) |
| Signal word | Warning |
| Hazard statements | H319, H410 |
| Precautionary statements | P264, P273, P280, P305+P351+P338, P337+P313, P391, P501 |
| Safety data sheet (SDS) | External MSDS |

Related compounds
| Other anions | Gadolinium(III) chloride |
| Other cations | Europium(III) oxide, Terbium(III) oxide |
- Except where otherwise noted, data are given for materials in their standard state (at 25 °C [77 °F], 100 kPa). verify (what is ?) Infobox references

Gadolinium(III) oxide (archaically gadolinia) is an inorganic compound with the formula Gd_{2}O_{3}. It is one of the most commonly available forms of the rare-earth element gadolinium, derivatives, of which are potential contrast agents for magnetic resonance imaging.

== Structure ==
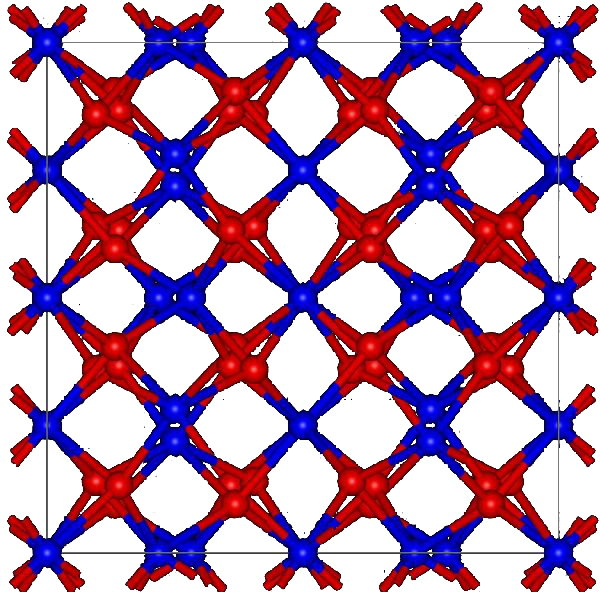
Cubic Gd_{2}O_{3}

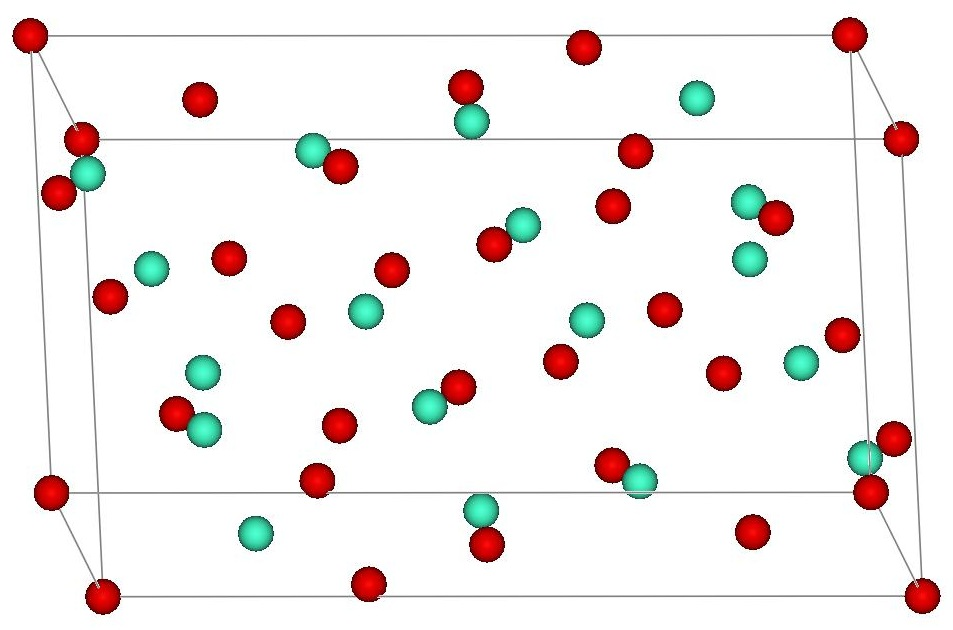
Monoclinic Gd_{2}O_{3} (gadolinium atoms are green, oxygen atoms are red)

Gadolinium oxide adopts two structures. The cubic (cI80, Ia3̅), No. 206) structure is similar to that of manganese(III) oxide and heavy trivalent lanthanide sesquioxides. The cubic structure features two types of gadolinium sites, each with a coordination number of 6 but with different coordination geometries. The second polymorph is monoclinic (Pearson symbol mS30, space group C2/m, No. 12). At room temperature, the cubic structure is more stable. The phase change to the monoclinic structure takes place at 1200 °C. Above 2100 °C to the melting point at 2420 °C, a hexagonal phase dominates.

== Preparation and chemistry ==
Gadolinium oxide can be formed by thermal decomposition of the hydroxide, nitrate, carbonate, or oxalate. Gadolinium oxide forms on the surface of gadolinium metal.

Gadolinium oxide is a rather basic oxide, indicated by its ready reaction with carbon dioxide to give carbonates. It dissolves readily in the common mineral acids with the complication that the oxalate, fluoride, sulfate and phosphate are very insoluble in water and may coat the grains of oxide, thereby preventing the complete dissolution.

== Nanoparticles of Gd_{2}O_{3} ==
Several methods are known for the synthesis of gadolinium oxide nanoparticles, mostly based on precipitation of the hydroxide by the reaction of gadolinium ions with hydroxide, followed by thermal dehydration to the oxide. The nanoparticles are always coated with a protective material to avoid the formation of larger polycrystalline aggregates.

Nanoparticles of gadolinium oxide is a potential contrast agent for magnetic resonance imaging (MRI). A dextran-coated preparation of 20–40 nm sized gadolinium oxide particles had a relaxivity of 4.8 s^{−1}mM^{−1} per gadolinium ion at 7.05 T (an unusually high field compared to the clinically used MRI scanners which mostly range from 0.5 to 3 T). Smaller particles, between 2 and 7 nm, were tested as an MRI agent.

== Potential applications ==
- Gadolinium(III) oxide is a host material in some solid-state lasers. Doped with rare-earth ions such as neodymium or erbium, Gd_{2}O_{3} can produce lasers with high efficiency and specific wavelengths, which are important in various applications, including telecommunications and medical procedures.
- Gd_{2}O_{3} is used in some solid oxide fuel cells (SOFCs).
