= Gadolinium(III) hydroxide =

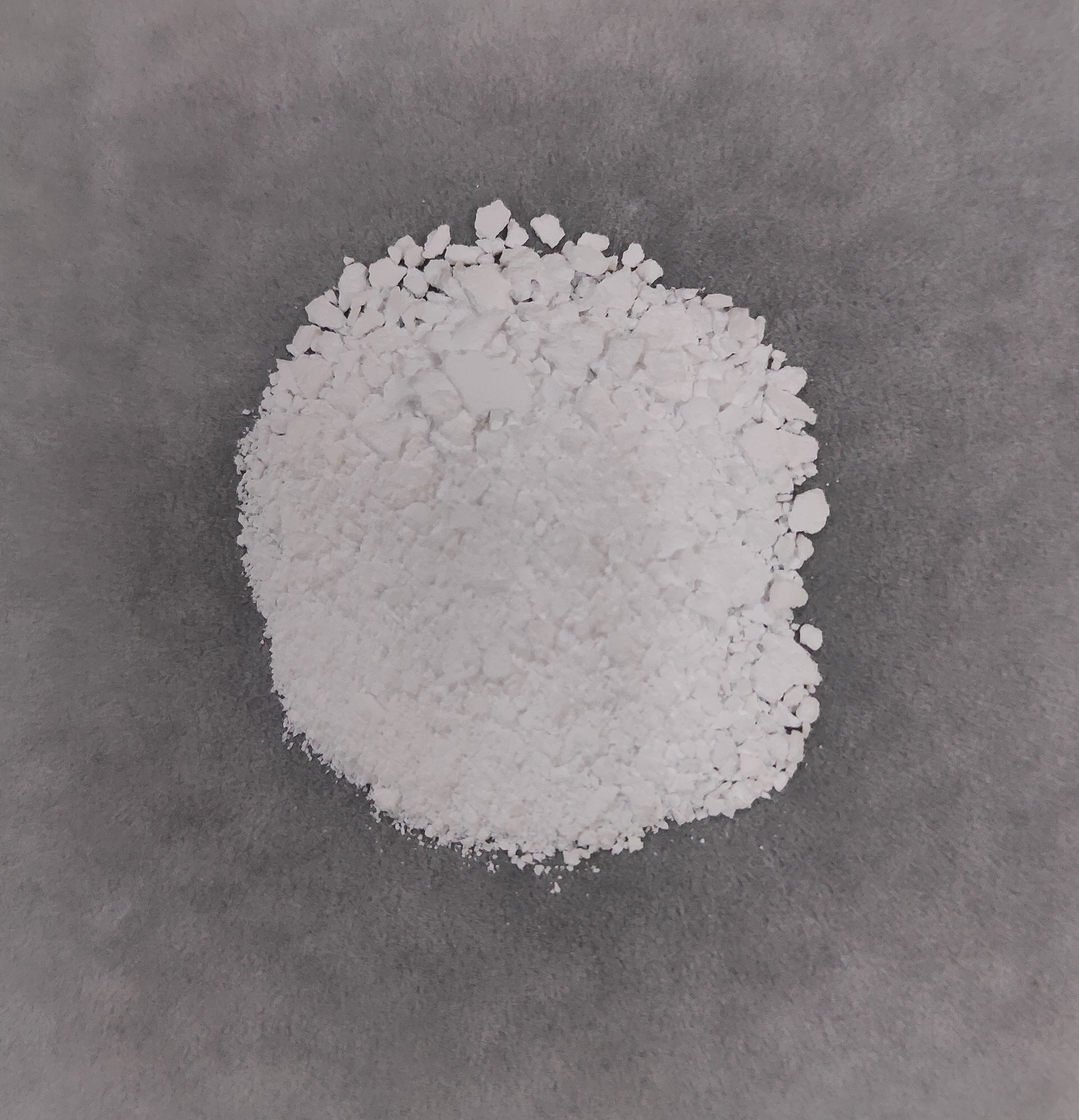

Names
- Systematic IUPAC name Gandolinium trihydroxide
- Other names: Gandolinium(III) hydroxide

Identifiers
CAS Number	16469-18-4
3D model (JSmol)	Interactive image
ChemSpider	77048
ECHA InfoCard	100.036.817
EC Number	240-516-5
PubChem CID	85434
CompTox Dashboard (EPA)	DTXSID80936979
- InChI: InChI=1S/Gd.3H2O/h;3*1H2/q+3;;;/p-3 Key: ILCLBMDYDXDUJO-UHFFFAOYSA-K
- SMILES: [OH-].[OH-].[OH-].[Gd+3]

Properties
Chemical formula	Gd(OH)_{3}
Molar mass	208.3 g/mol
Appearance	White solid
Melting point	307 °C (585 °F; 580 K) (decomposes)
Solubility in water	Insoluble

Structure
Crystal structure	Hexagonal

Hazards
- GHS labelling
Pictograms	(GHS07: Exclamation mark)
Signal word	Warning
Hazard statements	H315, H319, H335
Precautionary statements	P261, P264, P264+P265, P271, P280, P302+P352, P304+P340, P305+P351+P338, P319, P321, P332+P317, P337+P317, P362+P364, P403+P233, P405, P501
- Except where otherwise noted, data are given for materials in their standard state (at 25 °C [77 °F], 100 kPa). Infobox references

Gadolinium(III) hydroxide is a chemical compound with the formula Gd(OH)_{3}. Its nanoparticle form has potential uses for layering various drugs, such as diclofenac, ibuprofen, and naproxen.

== Production and properties ==
Gadolinium(III) hydroxide can be produced in various ways such as the reaction of gadolinium(III) nitrate and sodium hydroxide:

Gd(NO_{3})_{3} + NaOH → Gd(OH)_{3} + NaNO_{3}

If this compound is heated to 307 °C, it decomposes to gadolinium(III) oxide-hydroxide(GdOOH), which in turn decomposes to gadolinium(III) oxide if continually heated.

== Uses ==
Gadolinium(III) hydroxide has no commercial uses. However, gadolinium(III) hydroxide nanoparticles have gained interest as a coating agent for various anti-inflammatory drugs such as diclofenac, ibuprofen, and naproxen due to their property to be non-cytotoxic. The nanoparticles are produced by adding base anion exchange resin to gadolinium(III) nitrate.
